= History of Brasenose College, Oxford =

The history of Brasenose College, Oxford, began in 1509, when Brasenose College was founded on the site of Brasenose Hall. Its name is believed to derive from the name of a bronze knocker that adorned the hall's door. The college was associated with Lancashire and Cheshire, the county origins of its two founders – Sir Richard Sutton and the Bishop of Lincoln, William Smyth – a link that was maintained strongly until the latter half of the nineteenth century. The first principals navigated Brasenose, with its Catholic sympathisers, through the reformation and continuing religious reforms. Most of Brasenose favoured the Royalist side during the English Civil War, although it produced notable generals and clergy on both sides. The library and chapel were completed in the mid-seventeenth century, despite Brasenose suffering continuing financial problems.

The post-1785 period would see an era of prosperity of the college under Principal William Cleaver. The college began to be populated by gentlemen, its income doubling between 1790 and 1810, and academic success considerable. Efforts to reconstruct Brasenose were not completed, however, until the second half of the century with the addition of New Quad between 1886 and 1911. Brasenose's financial position remained secure, although under the tenure of Principal Edward Hartopp Cradock Brasenose's academic record waned greatly, with much of its success focussed on sports – where it excelled most notably in cricket and rowing. The mid-Century Royal Commissions were navigated – although they were opposed in form, their recommendations welcomed including the submission of accounts. The election of Charles Buller Heberden as principal in 1889 led to a reversal in Brasenose's academic failures, although its sporting performance suffered. Heberden was the first lay principal, presiding over an increasingly secular college, opening up the library to undergraduates, instituting an entrance exam for the first time and accepting Rhodes scholarships.

Brasenose lost 115 men in the First World War (including a quarter of the 1913 year), with its undergraduate numbers greatly reduced. Lord Curzon's post-war reforms were successfully instituted. The inter-war period was defined by William Stallybrass, who as fellow and eventual principal (until 1948) dominated college life. Brasenose once again produced top sportsmen – cricketers, rowers, and others. This came at the cost of falling academic standards and poorly performing finances, which would see Stallybrass' authority challenged. He died in a railway accident before he could be forced out, however. After the war, sporting achievements waned (although there were notable exceptions) but academic success did not improve significantly, in what was now one of Oxford's largest colleges.

The 1970s saw considerable social change in Brasenose: the admission of women beginning in 1974, more post-graduate attendees and fewer domestic staff. There was also considerable construction work to ensure that undergraduates could be housed for the entirety of their degree on the main site and on the Frewin site; this task was only completed in 1997 with the opening of the St Cross Building and Frewin extension. Law continued to be a strong subject for Brasenose (following on from Stallybrass, through Principals Barry Nicholas and Herbert Hart) as was the emerging subject of Philosophy, Politics and Economics (PPE), starting with the fellowship of Vernon Bogdanor. Brasenose's finances were secured, and it thus entered the twenty-first century in a good position as regards financial, extracurricular and academic success – the last having significantly recovered from its lows, helped by PPE.

== Foundation and early history ==
=== Brasenose Hall and Stamford migration ===
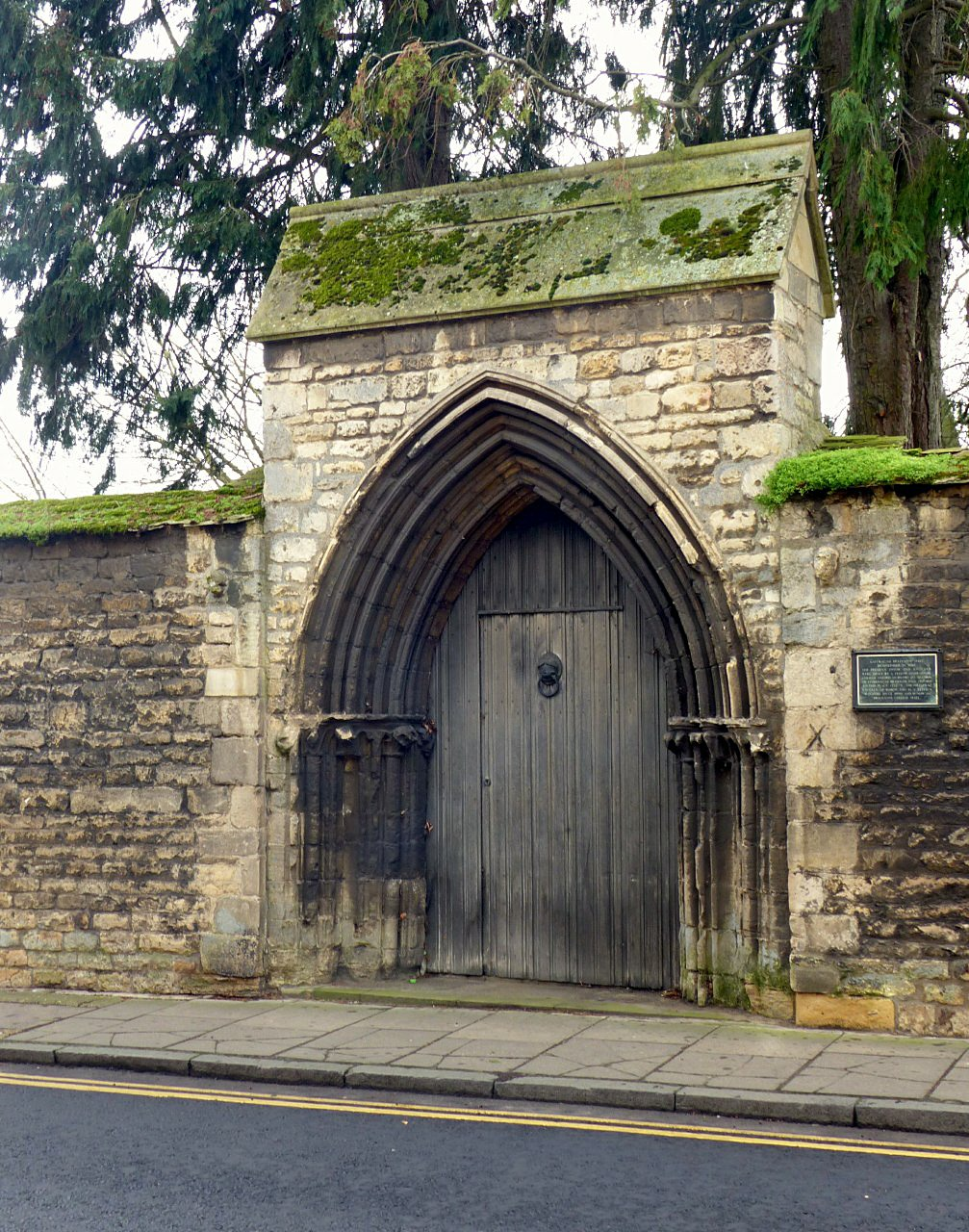
14th-century gate and wall of Brazenose Hall, Stamford, now bearing a replica door knocker

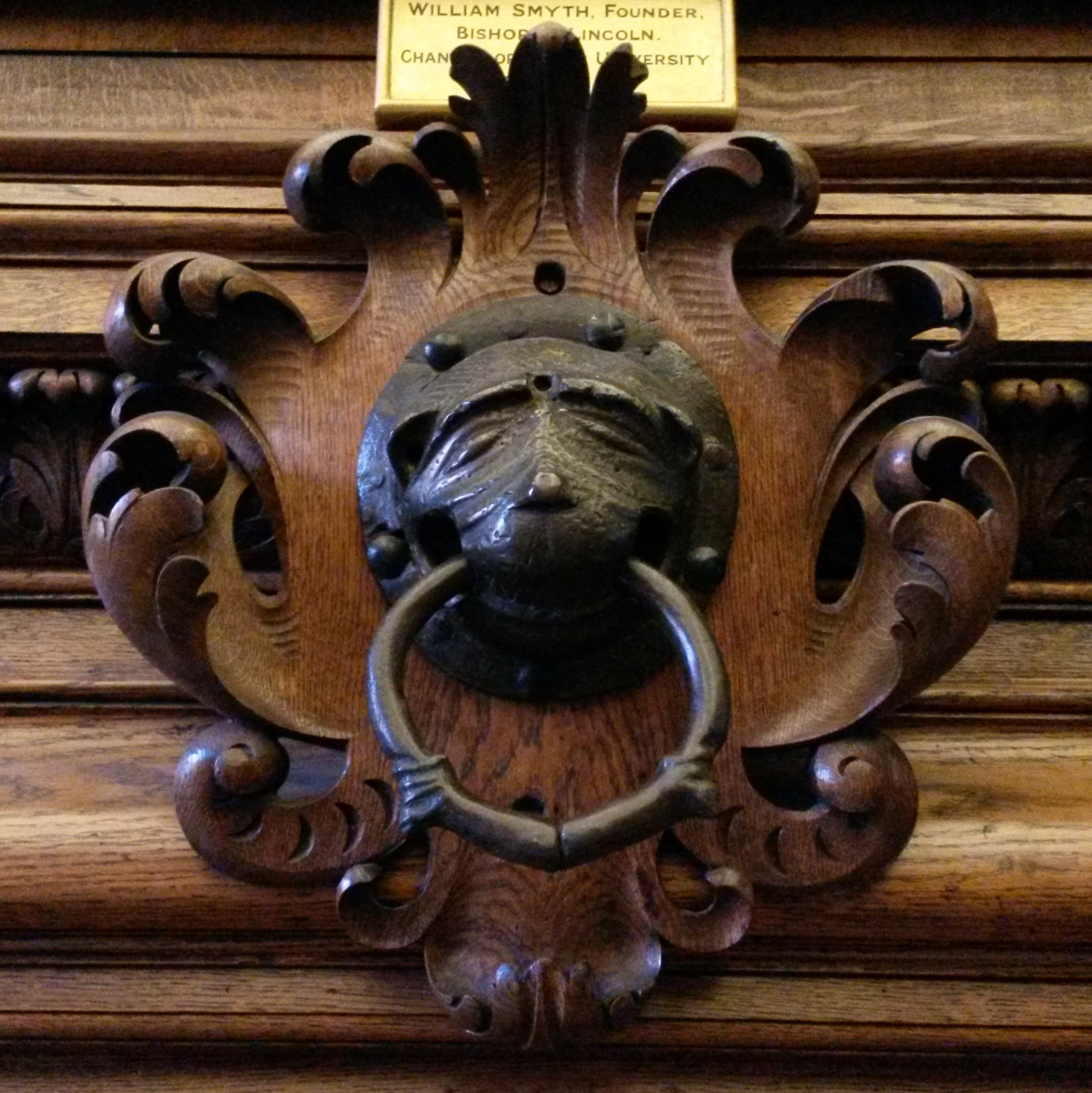
The original door knocker recovered from the Stamford gate, now hanging in the dining hall in Oxford

Map of the site, showing bordered in dotted lines the Halls (including Brasenose Hall) that the future college would eventually occupy (1900 buildings shown shaded for comparison)

Brasenose Hall was a building on the medieval Schools Street in central Oxford, now the west side of Radcliffe Square. Its location is now part of the site of the current front quadrangle of Brasenose College. The building was bought by the chancellor of the university in 1261 and is first mentioned by name in 1278, when it had four schools or lecture rooms. The name "Brasenose" is thought to originate from a brass–lead door knocker in the shape of a leopard (or lion) head. An alternative theory is that the name is a corruption of brasenhuis (brewhouse), but this is not widely accepted, although the college did have its own brewhouse up until 1889. The brewhouse theory is believed to date back only to 1837.

Brasenose appears to have aligned itself with Oxford's "Northerners" during periods of Northerner–Southerner violence in Oxford, and clerks from Brasenose Hall seem to have been part of the group of "Northerners" who left the ongoing violence in 1333 and made their way to Stamford, Lincolnshire, where they attempted to found a new university - one "Philippus le manciple atte Brasenose" was recorded in the list of Stamford scholars in 1335. The Stamford establishment was considered a rival, and after appeals from Oxford University it was closed down in 1335 by Edward III. Candidates for degrees at Oxford were required to swear that they would not give or attend lectures in Stamford as late as 1827.

Between the 17th and 19th centuries, various historians proposed that a demolished medieval building in Stamford known as "Brazenose Hall" (Note: While the Oxford college has settled on the spelling 'Brasenose', Stamford uses the form 'Brazenose'.) or "The College", had been a Stamford University hall founded by clerks from Oxford's Brasenose Hall, and that the 12th-century knocker on the building's surviving gate was the original from the Oxford hall. In 1890, the college purchased the house standing on the site in order to obtain the knocker, which they removed to Oxford, where it is now mounted above the college's high table.

In 1381, University College leased Brasenose Hall as an independent academic hall. Between 1480 and 1509 the Hall was responsible for supplying a vice-chancellor of the University and two of its proctors.

=== Foundation ===
The college is traditionally considered to have been founded in 1509 by a lawyer, Sir Richard Sutton, of Prestbury, Cheshire, and the Bishop of Lincoln, William Smyth. William Smyth has risen quickly through the ranks of the Church – albeit as a more able administrator than prelate – to become Bishop of Lincoln in 1496, Chancellor of the university between 1500 and 1503 and Lord President of the Marches in 1501, assisted by the influence of Lady Margaret Beaufort.

It was on 20 October 1508 that Smyth and eight other members of the college leased the site for the college – Brasenose Hall and neighbouring Little University Hall – from University College for ninety-two years at the cost of £3 a year, provided that they spend £40 improving the site within a year. On 1 June 1509, the foundation stone for Staircase I was laid. It was not until 15 January 1512 that a royal charter was obtained from Henry VIII. The transition between hall and college was not clear-cut; rather, the hall was left standing whilst the new buildings for the college were completed. Matthew Smyth, last principal of the hall, became first principal of the college, although he was referred to as "Principal of the College and Hall of Brasen Nose" as late as September 1514. It was in 1523 that Sutton transferred the lease formally over to the principal and fellows of the new college.

The Abbey of Oseney leased several halls to the new college, including Haberdasher, Glass, Black and Little St. Edmund, in 1530, and in 1556 Lincoln College let Staple Hall to Brasenose on a nominal rent of twenty shillings a year. These complemented other halls which had been taken on as Brasenose Hall had grown, including St Thomas's Hall, Shield Hall, Ivy Hall, St Mary's Entry, Salissury Hall and Broadgates Hall. The early college was governed by the statutes laid down by the formal charter of foundation in 1511–1512 (altered by a revised code of Sutton after Smyth's death) which was prefaced with the words:

In the name of the Holy and undivided Trinity, Father, Son and Holy Spirit, and of the most blessed Mother of God, Mary the glorious Virgin, and of Saints Hugh and Chad confessors, and also of St. Michael the archangel: We, William Smyth, Bishop of Lincoln, and Richard Sutton, Esquire, confiding in the aid of the Supreme Creator, who knows, directs, and disposes the wills of all that trust in him, do out of goods which in this life, not by our merits, but of the grace of His fulness, we have received abundantly, by royal authority and charter found, institute and establish in the University of Oxford, a perpetual College of poor and indigent scholars, who shall study and make progress in philosophy and sacred theology; commonly called The King's Haule and College of Brasennose in Oxford; to the praise, glory, and honour of Almighty God, of the glorious Virgin Mary, Saints Hugh and Chad confessors, St. Michael the archangel and All Saints; for the support and exaltation of the Christian Faith, for the advancement of holy church, and for the furtherance of divine worship.

Smyth had planned for a college of a principal and sixty bachelor fellows; however, Sutton lowered this to only twelve. The principal was required to be over thirty, a graduate and priest, and have the support of the Visitor, the Bishop of Lincoln. He was entitled to take up ecclesiastic office or duties that did not interfere overly with his job as principal; the fellows were required to be resident for ten months of each year. Entrants to the college would have been only 11 or 12 years old, with an intake both from those whose income was very low, alongside those from gentlemanly backgrounds. Fellows had a high degree of autonomy, but received only board and lodging as reward.

=== Early history ===
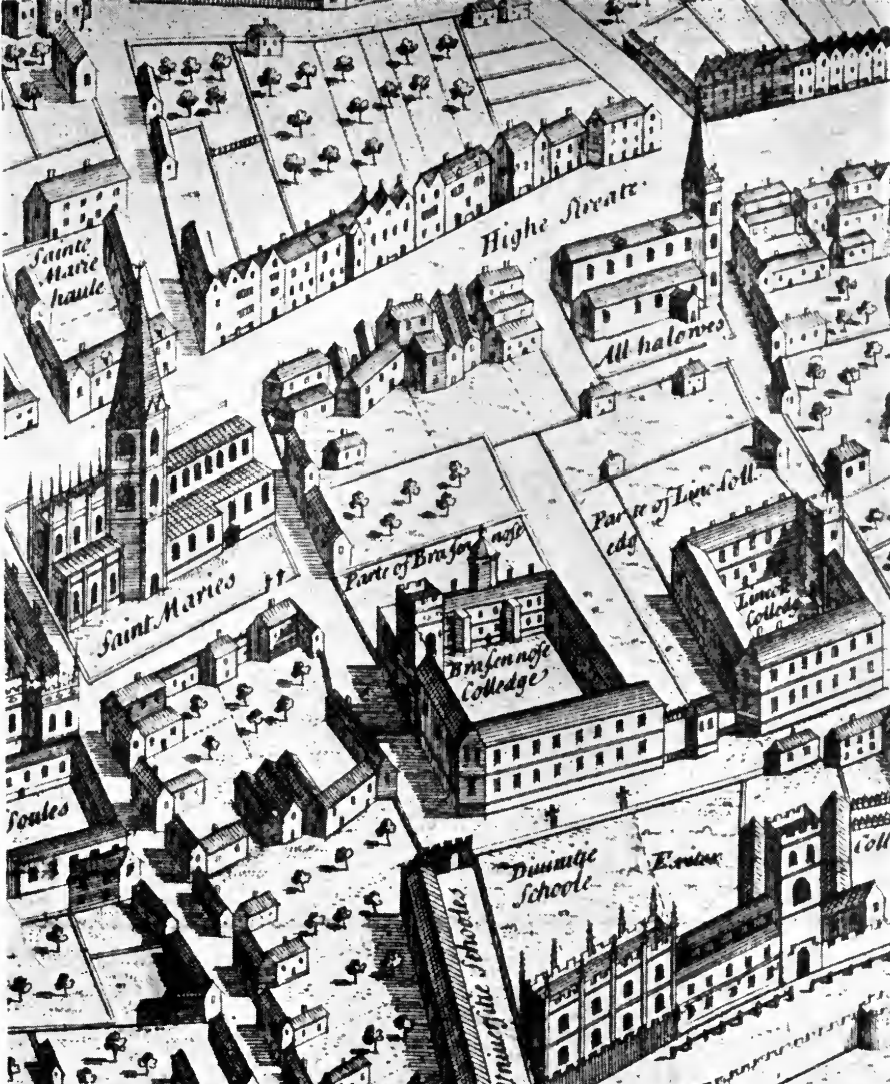
Brasenose College shown on Ralph Agas's map of Oxford (surveyed 1578; engraved 1588)

The college remained associated with Lancashire and Cheshire, with a particular preference for those from Prestbury and Prescot, the founders' birthplaces. This was also reflected in early benefactors. These included the donation of John Port, serjeant-at-law, for two fellowships for natives of Chester in 1522; that of William Clyfton, the sub-dean of York, for residents of York, Lincoln and Nottingham in 1538; and for the Brian Higden, Dean of York, who sponsored a fellowship for those in Yorkshire and Lincolnshire in 1549. Another notable benefactor during this period was John Claymond, the first President of Corpus Christi College, Oxford, who in 1538 gave funds to maintain six scholars at Brasenose, provided that their lectures on humanity and Greek take place at his own college. Only in 1572 was a Lectureship in Greek established at Brasenose, symptomatic of a conservatism that attached Brasenose to a monastic teaching style that was increasingly problematic during the reformation. By the end of the sixteenth century, however, the college did boast lectureships ("public readerships") in the new disciplines of logic and natural philosophy. By 1547, the income of the college had increased to almost £200 yearly, with an endowment that placed it squarely in the midst of other colleges in size; it did, however, make a yearly loss.

The original buildings took some time to finish; only the original gateway was lavished upon from the beginning. The buildings were only of a modest splendour: the hall was not completed until the end of the seventeenth century; the rooms economically decorated without wood panelling; the main quadrangle only of one storey and garrets. Although an earlier chapel is suspected, the area above Staircase I – now the Senior Common Room – was in use by 1521. It appears that the ecclesiastical furnishings promised by Smyth never arrived, and have been presumed taken by the college's first Visitor, Cardinal Wolsey. Although the chapel (or perhaps oratory) was plain, two chalices and two patens survived from the original three of each and have been identified as older than those of Corpus or Trinity, dating to the late fifteenth century. Similarly the Old Library, now staircase IV, room 4, was completed in 1520–1521, was not intended to be permanent but kept a considerable collection of books, most attained from benefactors, of which the most valuable were those donated by Henry Mason during the reign of James I. The library remained in that location until 1663.

The first two principals of the college, Matthew Smyth and John Hawarden, successfully navigated the college through the reformation period. The college retained strong Catholic tendencies, and support for the reforms of Henry VIII and Edward VIII was minimal. The Chapel's Dean, Thomas Hawarden, was opposed to the reforms, and was once called to the King's Privy Council to answer for his actions. Eventually, though, the continuing reforms were carried through; in particular, despite an exception for the university from the Act of Uniformity in 1549 for services other than mass, the enforcement of the Book of Common Prayer severely limited the ability of the college to maintain the old Catholic services whilst outwardly adopting the new reforms. The careful, and generally slow, path trod was exposed under Queen Mary, when five Fellows the left the college over its failings to reinstate the full Catholic mass quickly enough. Under Thomas Blanchard and Richard Harris the college finally accepted the religious reforms, and, moving into the later sixteenth century the college was responsible for housing several important figures of Protestantism: John Foxe, publicist, Christopher Goodman, protégé of Peter Martyr, Nicholas Grimald and Alexander Nowell. Despite producing several Anglican and evangelical sympathisers, the college retained many Catholic sympathisers. Six Brasenose fellows were executed for their loyalty to the pope: John Shert, Thomas Cottam and Laurence Johnson at Tyburn in 1582, and Robert Anderson, Francis Ingleby and George Nichols thereafter, only smaller in number than St John's.

== Seventeenth century ==
=== Civil War period ===
The chancellorship of Archbishop William Laud, beginning in 1630, was a calm and profitable time for the university as a whole, dominating as it did the city of Oxford. The Parliamentarian occupation during the Civil War in 1642, and the subsequent Royalist siege ended this, however. Although the Parliamentarian army was careful to protect the university's buildings and freedoms upon regaining the city following its surrender in 1646. These events, and the plague that came to Oxford in 1643, did not escape Brasenose. Brasenose produced members of both sides of the war, although in generally leant in favour of the Royalists: the Protestation of 1641 was met with reservation and ingenious mechanisms to avoid reply on the part of many members of the college. Members of Parliament William Brereton, Humphrey Salway, Henry Brooke and John Cartwright, James Chaloner, Colonel Thomas Croxton, major general and MP William Jephson and commandant John Bingham all fought for parliament; James Bradshawe and Peter Ince, among Brasenose's many clergy, also supported the Roundheads. On the Royalist side stood Sir Alexander Radcliffe, Major Peter Leicester, MP Sir Edward Littleton, Edward Fischer (author of Appeal to the Conscience), Francis Newman and the majority of Brasenose's clergy. Some Royalists stayed in the college during the civil war, including Sir William Le Neve (Clarenceux King of Arms), Dr Edward Lake, and the Duchess of Buckingham; two, Sir John Spelman and Sir Henry St George (Garter King of Arms) died during their stay.

Following the war, three visitations reformed the University of Oxford in the Parliamentarians' preferred style, including purging Brasenose of its remaining loyalists. Sir William Petty, a former student, was among those promoted to fellow of the college. Samuel Radcliffe, principal, was to be replaced with Dr Daniel Greenwood, a long-term fellow of the college of Puritan sympathies by order of the visitors. However, the college held out repeatedly against efforts to expel or remove its fellows and principal, most through deliberate inactivity. Radcliffe was ill and continued to personally oppose handing over control of the college to Greenwood, particularly the college archives and treasury. The fellows, also opposing Greenwood, instead elected Thomas Yate to replace Radcliffe upon his death, although owing to the visitors' choice of Greenwood he would not take up his post fully for twelve years. Over this period, thirteen of Brasenose's sixteen remaining fellows were expelled, but the college survived.

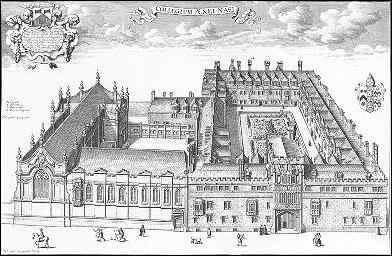
An illustration of Brasenose in 1674

Radcliffe was also responsible for the institution of four lectureships, philosophy, humanity, Greek, and Hebrew, although not all were new to Brasenose. However, Radcliffe's principalship continued the mismanagement of Brasenose's finances, which had sunk into debt by the start of the seventeenth century: battels had gone unpaid, debts to tradesmen run up. Radcliffe's sale of two college leases landed the college in unsuccessful litigation with Radcliffe's family. A "draconian" visitation took place in 1643, when the college owed £1,750. By 1646, after the civil war, Brasenose still owed £1,214 8s 0d. During the war, the college had loaned the King £600, which it would not get back. However, the post-civil war period saw Brasenose receive support from both current members and those expelled; Greenwood and the bursar, John Houghton, continued the building work started by Radcliffe. Finances were gradually improved, with assistance from the government, up to the Restoration.

The seventeenth century saw a second wave of building at Brasenose, started under the principalship of Samuel Radcliffe. Under his leadership an attic story was added to Old Quad in the 1630s, and the current chapel and library both constructed between 1656 and 1666. The chapel, in particular, was a mix of architectural styles – Gothic revival and baroque – and thus not without criticism. The work totalled some £4,000, achieved eventually despite Brasenose's previous money problems; by 1680, college income was a sustainable £600 a year. A Senior Common Room, believed to be Staircase II, Room 3, had been added by 1682.

=== Restoration period ===
Throughout the second half of the century, Brasenose remained around the fourth largest college of the university behind Christ Church and Exeter; the proportion of students and Fellows from lower income groups was much higher than most other colleges, having improved during the second half of the century. Entrants were also heavily biased towards those from Cheshire and Lancashire: two-thirds of Oxford entrants from those counties went to Brasenose in the first half of the century; three-quarters by its end. Indeed, by that time, the majority of Brasenose student hailed from one of those two north-western counties, assisted by the localised scholarships. In 1679, the college received an endowment from Sarah Seymour, Duchess of Somerset to fund four "Somerset" scholars, to be drawn from a free school of Manchester. She also donated further money for additional scholarships (drawn alternately from Manchester, Marlborough, and Hereford) upon her death in 1686.

The Restoration, along with a return to the pre-war Laudian church and the passing of the Act of Uniformity in 1662, posed few problems for the sympathetic and quickly reformed Brasenose; only one fellow left without agreeing. For some, nominal allegiance to the new regime was the order of the day, supported by a weary college. The Restoration period was one of disciplinary laxity across the university; Brasenose was no different, with some of its students taking part in riots. Yate was instituted as successor – and somewhat retrospectively as predecessor – to Greenwood; six of the thirteen fellows that had been expelled returned; other personnel in the college were replaced. The period saw a rejuvenation of teaching in the university as a whole and a new cache of new thinkers, including Brasenose's Petty.

During this time, French physician Samuel de Sorbière and English contemporary Samuel Pepys were among visitors. Alumni of the period included James Alban Gibbes, George Clarke and Elias Ashmole, although only Petty formed part of the emerging mathematics and sciences.

=== Glorious Revolution period ===
Upon William III and Mary II's rise to the throne in 1688, Oxford became an established centre of the new regime. The revolution itself was smoothly accepted by Brasenose, with the exception of only a handful. Brasenose, however, remained fairly small, with only six senior fellows, although among colleges it retained some power. The college itself remained loyal to the church above the king and allegiance to oaths and ceremony was enforced, even if college members themselves were not always devout Anglicans. William Hulme gave lands in the then county of Lancaster for the maintenance of "four exhibitioners of the poorest sort" in 1691, drawn from the selections of the Warden of Manchester, the Rector of Prestwich and the Rector of Bury.

== Eighteenth century ==
Throughout the Georgian period, Brasenose remained "tactically Hanoverian but Jacobite by instinct", and a strong bias towards Lancashire and Cheshire, and lesserly towards the north of England as a whole, from where over half of members of the college would come in the 1690–1799 period. Admissions were predominantly from the lower orders – either in terms of class or wealth. John Meare, principal since 1681, was himself a commoner and a supporter of the Glorious revolution; his election to the vice-chancellorship of the university in 1697 was greeted angrily by Tories.

At Brasenose, in 1710, Meare was replaced by Robert Shippen, a prominent crypto-Jacobite in Oxford. Shippen, a Tory, was personally despised. He mounted several campaigns for further power, acquiring several advowsons in East London, including the rectory of Whitechapel. Shippen wanted it for himself and ejected the incumbent at the cost of much personal animosity from parishioners. He then went on to become vice-chancellor of the university, and to continually interfere in the institutions of Oxford – the Ashmolean, the Bodleian and other colleges. He was responsible for the much-need purchase of seven sites on the High Street, the completion of a new common room for fellows. However, he had much grander plans for both Brasenose and Oxford – ostensibly to put Brasenose at the centre of a new "forum" for the university – that were not completed, despite some considerably time and money spent on them. In this regard he worked alongside Dr George Clarke, sometime Brasenose student and more recently designer of several colleges and library buildings, and Nicholas Hawksmoor. Brasenose, and Shippen and his allies, did, however, play a crucial role in formulating and completing the plans for the Radcliffe Camera. Shippen's own Jacobitism appeared to subside – perhaps adjudicating on the mood of the time – but Brasenose's did not; ale verses were sung to "our true English king" (rather than the Hanoverian George I). A panegyric for James II was even said yearly for at least ten years from 1701, at the bequest of Sir Francis Bridgeman (married 1673). The Jacobite rising of 1715 caused a riot in Oxford, and not without Brasenose involvement.

Little changed in the century up to 1785; the average age of fellows, mostly "youthful clerics", remained a little under thirty, having been elected to the fellowship at 23, on average, to serve for around fifteen years. Helped by the Duchess of Somerset's bequest, Manchester Grammar School supplied up to a sixth of Brasenose's intake, and proportionately far more of its fellows. Despite this, the college resisted the growing cause of Methodism.

Towards the second half of the century, Brasenose began to lose its reputation for ignorance; it also became wealthier. Its social ranking improved, and it attracted more members. The accounts were much improved: from a deficit of £444 in 1761 to a surplus of £476 in 1781. This must have been helped by the introduction of Arabic numerals (rather than Roman numerals) as late as 1773. The Radcliffe Camera was opened in 1749, assisting the college's attempts at self-improvement. Social barriers were broken down – both by the reduction in the duties of the lowest groups and the privileges of the richest, and the increasing wealth of entrants to the college generally. The college remained far from the most elite or exclusive of colleges; nor, by the standards of wealthier colleges, did its members misbehave. Among the 1774 intake, 20 were gentlemen, but it was one of the remaining seven – Henry Addington – who would achieve most fame as Brasenose's first prime minister. It was into this setting that William Cleaver was made principal in 1785, the principals of the previous eighty years – Francis Yarborough, William Gwyn, Ralph Cawley, and Thomas Barker– being without real note. Yarborough oversaw improvements to library and hall, the former guided by the addition of his own considerable collection of books. It was also set upon that improvements to accommodation were needed; two properties on the High Street were bought, to be turned into the principal's residence, the lodgings above the Lodge becoming accommodation for bursar and fellows. This was overseen by Gwyn, but he too did not live to see its completion. It would continue to be the principal's residence until 1886. Barker was a man of modest means; thus, it was Cleaver who would take Brasenose into a new age of prosperity.

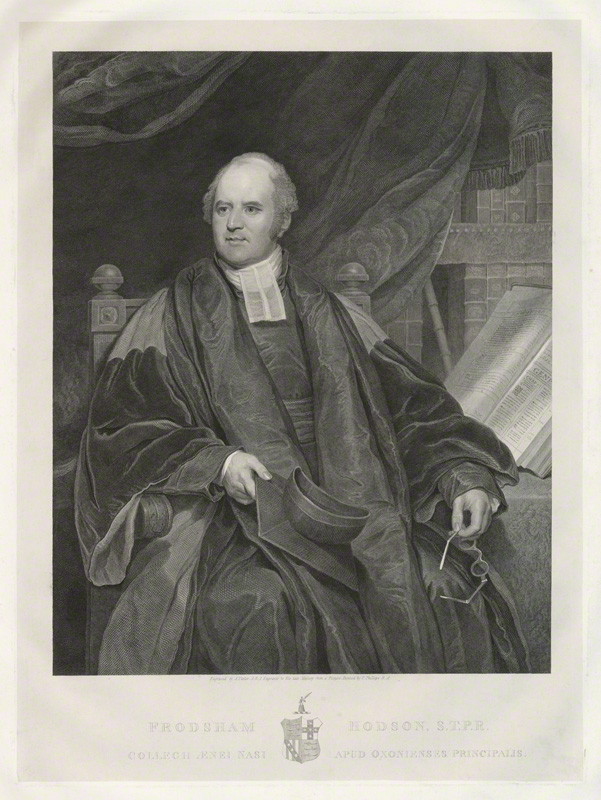
Frodsham Hodson

Wholesale reform of Oxford examinations began in the late eighteenth century, proposed by, among others, Brasenose's John Napleton in his pamphlet Considerations on the Public Exercises for the First and Second Degrees in the University of Oxford. It was Cleaver and his successor Frodsham Hodson that would continue the reforms and apply them to Brasenose itself. Cleaver was from the minor gentry and set out from the start to make Brasenose the place of rich men. Unable to secure the librarianship of the Bodleian whilst fellow, he had instead become tutor to his patron George Nugent-Temple-Grenville, 1st Marquess of Buckingham – a position which he used to lead two of the Duke's sons and other members of the family to Brasenose; the sons' uncle, Baron Grenville, became the university's chancellor. Under his leadership into the early nineteenth century, numbers improved dramatically and so did the class of people coming: Brasenose began to be dominated by gentlemen like the Egertons, the Grenvilles, and of Richard Rainshaw Rothwell I. Its income over doubled between 1790 and 1810 to £9,200 per annum, with the college maintaining its links to the north-west. Among the other acquisitions of Cleaver was the services of Hodson, a Liverpudlian.

The Phoenix Common Room (the oldest dining club in Oxford) was founded at Brasenose in 1782, and certainly in place by 1786. It came to have a uniform, code of practice, and extensive wine cellar. It also took part of the role of the modern Junior Common Room in respect of social activities – although membership was limited to 12, it was elected on rotation.

== Nineteenth century ==
=== Regency period ===
Cleaver and Hodson made another attempt to redesign the High Street frontage of Brasenose, securing first the services of James Wyatt and later approaching John Nash when Wyatt failed to deliver. No plans were ever laid down, however. Three sets of designs were produced eventually by John Soane, but rather too expensive for the college. The next years would see only temporary buildings on the High Street site. Hodson was made principal in 1809 following Cleaver's resignation. A year before, and under Hodson's guidance, the exiled Louis XVIII had visited Brasenose; in 1814, the royal families of the United Kingdom, Russia, and Prussia dined in the Radcliffe Camera – food and pre-dinner arrangements organised by Brasenose. In 1815, in the first inter-collegiate boat race, Brasenose went to the head of the river. Brasenose's academic record was good, with seven of thirty-seven first class degrees awarded across Oxford between 1808 and 1810. Among these was that of William Gregson (later draughtsman of the Great Reform Bill) – deemed the best the examiners had ever seen. The 1810–1820 period contained several academic reforms, particularly to the nature of examinations – the institution of terminally collections, including in mathematics and natural philosophy, something of a break from the focus of the past. Brasenose went into the regency one of only three colleges – the others being Christ Church and Oriel – to be both fashionable and academically successful; it ran a waiting list whilst other colleges had spare places.

Alongside the Phoenix Common Room ran the Alfred Lodge (founded in 1769), The Club (1790) and the Apollo; together they made Brasenose central to Oxford socialization in this period. Between 1818 and 1837, however, life at Oxford was changing: it became far more "diligent and orderly", less boisterous. Brasenose maintained its reputation for some time longer (there were still stories of excess, particularly drink). In 1840, several members of the Phoenix resigned, and Sunday meetings and Satanic toasts abolished, after John Woodhouse's death in a meeting – according to tradition, dragged through the bars of a window overlooking Brasenose Lane immediately upon toasting the devil. It ushered in a period of Victorian morality for Brasenose.

Ashurst Turner Gilbert was elected principal in 1822, aged only 35; he had secured the fellowship in 1809 on the strength of a first. He disliked teaching – although he admitted it paid the bills – and much preferred being principal. There, he would be eventually made vice-chancellor of the university and later Bishop of Chichester. Gilbert committed Brasenose to a cause of neutral politics and mainstream Anglicanism, strongly rejecting Tractarian and Evangelical ideas including supporting the censure of Dr. Renn D. Hampden. His time was spent pre-occupied with the religious tensions of the university, having spent time opposing changes to religious services in Oxford on behalf of Oxford Tories.

Despite an intake dominated by commoners at Brasenose, Oxford had become a university dominated by the independently wealthy; the Edinburgh Review decried it as "simply a great public school".

=== Victorian period ===
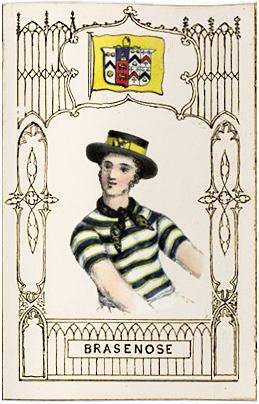
A card showing Brasenose rowing colours, 1840

Gilbert's successor in 1842 was Richard Harrington, who inherited a college in good shape: income was around £15,000; only Christ Church was significantly bigger in size. Academic reforms, particularly with regard to examinations – which were to be administered by the university, rather than the college – were instituted across Oxford in the first half of the century. Brasenose's proportion of first-class degrees fell sharply from its previous peak. By 1850, no matriculation exam was instituted at Brasenose, as at other colleges, although the other examinations were altered: responsions moved forward and moderations instituted. Brasenose, like the university, was yet to truly reform the range of subjects studied, however. It was only in 1849 that modern sciences were only given a separate School (and thus examination) in 1849; law and modern history a year later.

Edward Hartopp Cradock (known as "Chief") became principal in 1853, and would lead the college until 1886; most notable in his tenure was the introduction of organised sports and the resulting public image of Brasenose as a sporting college. This included the membership of oarsman Walter Bradford Woodgate, founder of Vincent's Club, and sometime president of the club Tom Edwards-Moss. It produced many blues rowers, seven in 1860–1867 alone. Between 1870 and 1872, the Oxford varsity cricket team was similarly dominated by Brasenose men, including Conrad Wallroth. One, Arthur Heath, went on to become a Conservative Party politician, although legal and careers in the church still dominated. Brasenose was also very well turned out in rugby and football – including Cuthbert Ottaway and Heath – but cricket and rowing defined its success.

Among other pursuits, amateur dramatics flourish (even though Brasenose was an all-male college). Overall, the intake and careers of undergraduates remained dominated by the Church (up to half), drawn from a range of backgrounds. The college remained largely independent of the large public schools. Brasenose's academic record remained solid, if unremarkable; its strengths lay in classics, although one of its most prominent academics – Arthur Evans – studied modern history.

Brasenose was staunchly opposed to the establishment of the first Royal Commission of 1850–51 into standards at the Universities of Oxford and Cambridge, claiming that it lacked authority and served an "ignorant" purpose. The college believed that if it were to support the commission, it might "at all future times be exposed to fluctatuions of political parties, attacks and influences very injurious to the peace and to the steady performance of its duties". It instead petitioned the crown to abandon the commission, citing certain freedoms under the Bill of Rights 1689. However, the commissioners were granted the authority to force cooperation and the petition rejected.

As it turned out, the college was happy to pursue many of the commission's aims: the restriction of the preference for candidates from the north-west (although the Somerset scholars remained), and the reduction of living expenses – something for which new buildings offering cheaper living and even union with Lincoln College were considered but ultimately rejected. More problematic were reforms to the distribution of power and funding between senior and junior fellows – although in 1855–1857 ordinances were put in place giving junior fellows the same role in governance as their seniors. Thus the situation began to improve for junior fellows as the older fellows were gradually replaced. The changes made by the second Royal Commission (brought to "inquire into the property and income" of Oxford and Cambridge colleges) to the running of the accounts and the system of university-wide finances were unopposed by Brasenose. The accounts which the college submitted reveal an income of £16,000, of which nearly £10,000 came from land, other property, stocks and shares. Expenditure was around £13,600, which left Brasenose in a secure financial position. Although the university as a whole was hit hard by the agricultural crisis of the latter quarter of the century, Brasenose's income from agrarian sources was already low, and increasing yields from urban holdings made up most of the fall. Brasenose's response to the weakening economy was to increase its student intake by 1875 to three times what it had been in 1860, almost levelling that of the mid-regency period. This did, however, increase considerably the proportion of applicants from public schools.

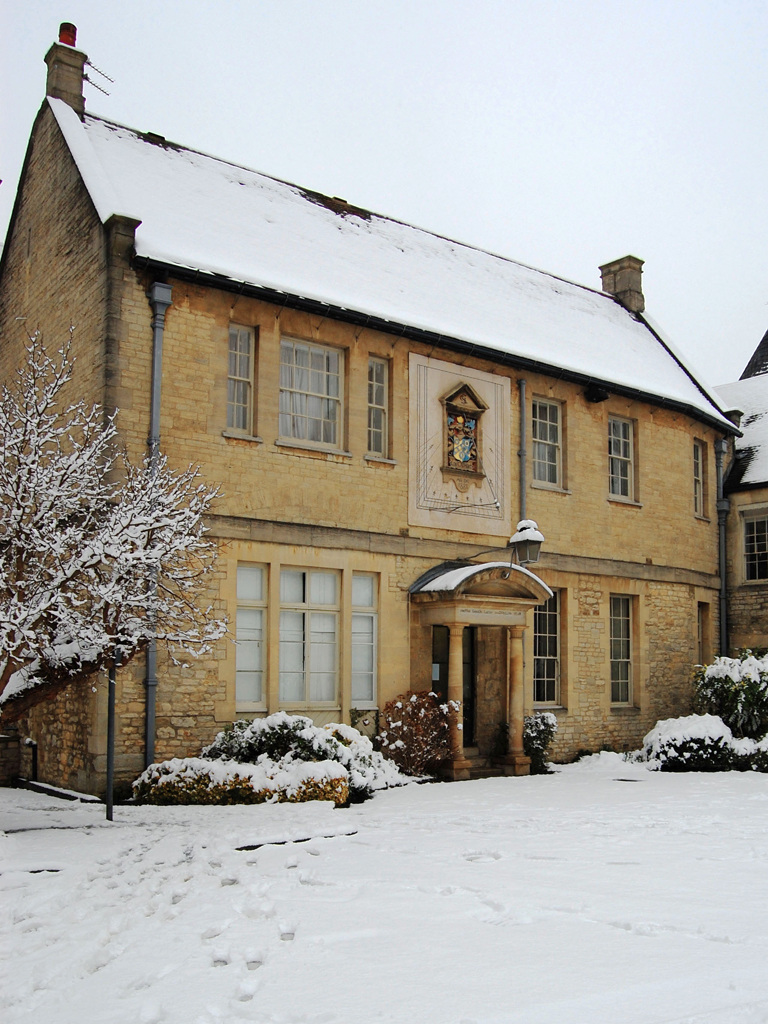
Modern view of Frewin Hall

Between 1859 and 1860, Frewin Hall housed the future Edward VII whilst he attended Christ Church. The chapel and old kitchen were planned to form part of a new, third, quadrangle for Brasenose. The valuable rents that the shops on the south side of Brasenose earned the college provided the most significant reason for the delay in further expansion, which only began in 1886 when work on the west side was started. It was finally completed in 1911, the last work having been done to the High Street frontage. Frewin Hall was reconstructed between 1887 and 1896, as were the chapel and antechapel. It had been in 1886 that Cradock had died and was replaced by Albert Watson.

Walter Pater, a writer, was sometime fellow of Brasenose; his writing would later be accused of being "immoral" and inappropriate letters to a student at Balliol, Walter Hardinge, got Pater into trouble. He survived, however, and continued to form part of the literary scene in Oxford and London, tutoring poet C. L. Shadwell and writer Humphrey Ward, lecturing Oscar Wilde and dining with Simeon Solomon and Oscar Browning. Another alumnus of this period was Frederic Weatherly, sometime lyricist and lawyer. It was Weatherley, Brasenose's coxswain, who threw himself out the boat in 1868 and thus invented the coxless four – although Brasenose won the race, they were disqualified. In 1880, the future Earl Haig entered Brasenose, although he was among very few statesmen to come through its ranks during the century.

Charles Buller Heberden became principal in 1889. He saw sporting as a means to the institution of civility than an end in itself; together with Richard Lodge, it was this spirit that dominated his tenure as principal. Academic rigour was reintroduced to the college, and the staff of Brasenose were increasingly successful in maintaining discipline. Until the end of the century, however, the number of students achieving blues outnumbered those attaining firsts. Author John Buchan joined in 1895, a man of this new era – although his work continued to portray Brasenose as its previous muscular stereotype. Heberden was also the first lay principal, although he was personally committed to the church – purchasing an organ for the chapel out of his own personal funds. Brasenose was frequently represented as boasting no academic prowess at all. Three of the ten fellows were set aside for non-classicists; a Junior Common Room (JCR) was created in 1887; in 1897 the library was opened up to undergraduates; in 1899, Fellows were granted a right to sabbatical leave. The fellows themselves were increasingly secular; only four of fourteen fellows were clergy.

== First half of the twentieth century ==
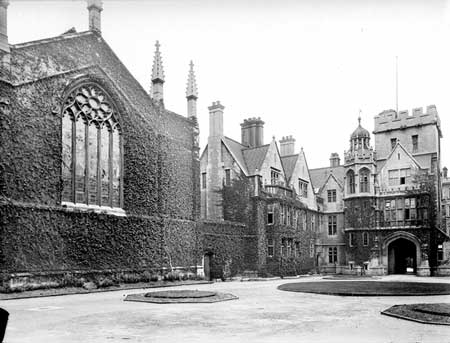
New Quad in 1900

In the pre-War period, the shift in focus to academia continued. Brasenose's rowing sides sunk down the tables. In 1901, the college introduced an entrance exam, and new Rhodes Scholarships were created in 1904. The Pater Society was founded in 1907, in memory of the fellow.

Like much of the UK, Brasenose suffered a considerable number of casualties in the First World War: 661 members served, with 114 killed, for the Allies; four members served in the German military, of whom two were killed. Canadian Talbot Mercer Papineau, who had attended Brasenose on a Rhodes Scholarship, was among those to support the war. Over a quarter of the 1913 year were killed, in a college that was considerably smaller than it had been. Some members were decorated: Arnold Jackson became the British Army's youngest Brigadier, and received the Distinguished Service Order with three bars. By 1918, Brasenose had just eight undergraduates.

=== Inter-war period ===
The inter-war period saw Brasenose adapt to changing conditions within the university: the abolition of Greek as a compulsory language; the admission of women to degrees; and the acceptance of the first government funding. Across the university, these were spearheaded by Chancellor Lord Curzon (appointed in 1907), who wished to avoid another Royal Commission. There were also attempts to broaden the university's intake of students from poorer backgrounds, but living costs of £400 across a three-year degree made this difficult. Curzon was supported by his Vice-Chancellor, now Brasenose's Heberden. Within Brasenose, however, he was opposed by Brasenose's youngest fellow, William Teulon Swan Sonnenschein (who in 1917 took the surname "Stallybrass").

Charles Henry Sampson, principal between 1920 and 1936, did little more than "keep the ship on an even keel": it was Stallybrass as vice-principal (1914–1936) that defined Brasenose between the wars. Stallybrass was a keen sportsman, although like Heberden he saw it only as a means to an end – albeit a plethora of laudable ends. Brasenose had a middling income of £24,000 a year, with a similarly average 180 undergraduates. Religious attendance was relaxed, and fees for returning to college between 9 and 11PM abolished. Brasenose's collegiate link with Gonville and Caius College, Cambridge was established. Staircases XIV and XV were created, the only significant changes to the college buildings; the twenty fellows gradually replaced in Stallybrass' own image. Brasenose went back to the head of the river in 1928, rising from 22nd in 1922. Although Oxford's performance in rowing was poor, Brasenose was central to its few successes against Cambridge. It would sink to sixth in 1934 – although notable among its members was John Gorton, future Prime Minister of Australia. Success in rowing was matched in rugby and cricket – with Brasenose producing players such as Alexander Obolensky and Ian Smith. Brasenose rugby only reached its peak after the Second World War, with players such as Brian Boobbyer and Philip Moore, Baron Moore of Wolvercote. In cricket, Geoffrey Legge and Greville Stevens were early players; Ian Peebles Gerry Chalk and Roger Kimpton followed them: between 1934 and 1938 at least five members of the university team came from Brasenose. it may have been Brasenose's attachment to sport that meant it was slow to phase out Pass men. The effect on academic success was considerable; Brasenose slumped in performance except in law, where it excelled. In the 1930s Brasenose recorded no more than six firsts in a year; a total assisted by seven firsts in 1937–1939 in law, out a total of 13 across the university. The future Lord Scarman (Lord of Appeal in Ordinary) was among undergraduates; two contemporaries and aspiring students, Richard Holdsworth and Michael Peacock were killed in the Second World War.

In terms of intake, by 1937 there were 201 undergraduates; it was a uniform selection that was almost completely middle class, like the rest of the university. Over 60% of entrants came from independent schools, perhaps because of the £250 a year cost of reading towards a degree. It had, unlike some other college, students from several other nations: Muhammad Aslam Khan Khattak and Abbas Khaleeli from British India among them. Students were varied: Baptist Thomas George Cowling became an astronomer and member of the Royal Society, in contrast, Jew Paul Dehn went on to become a film critic and screenwriter. Other alumni of this period include Charles Langbridge Morgan, Edward Atiyah and William Golding.

=== Second World War ===
Brasenose was a smaller community during the war, but it kept going. Once again, union with Lincoln College was discussed: but in other areas, temporary merger was more appropriate; thus, Brasenose and Christ Church fielded single sports teams. The college hosted military personnel as it had in the First World War; a Nissen hut was even set up in Deer Park. Brasenose sent a flood of undergraduates into the forces; in particular, the college's sporting, masculine ethos meant many joined the Royal Air Force. This would contribute significantly to a high death total – 123 for the Allies and 1 for the Germans – more than in the First World War, although proportionately less. Many of Brasenose's sporting heroes died; among survivors were future Archbishop of Canterbury Robert Runcie and cricketer Pieter van der Bijl.

The immediate post-war period once again reform on the agenda with, in particular, the passing of the Education Act 1944. The effect was dramatic: state support, through bursaries and central grants, was hugely increased; the proportion of state school entrants increased considerably; for the first time in over a hundred years, there was considerable competition over places. Stallybrass, made vice-chancellor of the university in 1947, was sceptical about state education. It was not the quality of the students, but rather the means of state control that worried him. Annual grants from government were made to the university, not colleges, and might yet replace endowments as Brasenose's primary source of income, making it dependent on university support and increasing "federation" of colleges in a university superstructure. Stallybrass worried over this loss of college autonomy, although it was matched with a doubled grant from the government and huge sums set aside for capital spending. The right of Brasenose to choose its own students might be under threat, he thought; as it happened, the Labour government decided against corporate admission and threats to Stallybrass' power mostly resided within Brasenose.

Some members of the governing body, returning in some cases from the war, wished to realign the college with the new national spirit. The principal's considerable role in admissions – which Stallybrass had used to elevate sportsmen – was the subject of criticism and accusations of financial under-performance and over-spending were made. A challenge was made directly in the bringing of a motion calling for a review of Brasenose's financial performance since 1922. However, before it could be debated, Stallybrass was killed, having apparently fallen from a train whilst returning to Oxford from a university meeting in London. Although the possibility of suicide was considered, the coroner ruled the case one of "death by misadventure". Hugh Last was elected in his place, although reluctantly: he had been told by his doctor that he was terminally ill, but the fellows were insistent.

== Second half of the twentieth century ==
Brasenose's finances entered the second half of the century in poor shape, and considerably worse than the period between 1930 and 1931, slipping relative to other colleges from 3rd to 8th. But they were improved during Last's tenure, along with undergraduate admissions; the college showed a surplus in 1952–1953, and income in 1957 (£104,000) was double what it had been in 1938. Pay for fellows was still poor, and they were small in number compared to other colleges. There was a sizeable entertainment budget, however, something which, combined with the long hours, may have contributed to short lifespans. Only in 1987 did a sitting fellow reach retirement age. Last resigned as principal in 1956, dying shortly after. Turnover was considerable, although some fellows stayed on: Maurice Platnauer became principal in 1956, and retired in 1960; he was replaced by Sir Noel Hall. Hall's tenure was troubled, not externally, but rather from Hall's patchy knowledge of the college and staff; his selection, faute de mieux, was sometimes questioned, although he remained well-liked. However, the college, which had thus far stayed assured, found itself in a changing environment. Herbert Hart, however, principal between 1973 and 1978, was the first to be elected from outside Brasenose. Lord Windlesham, made principal in 1989, was the first to hold Cabinet Office.

Brasenose's reputation for law remained, under firstly Ron Maudsley – a Tutorial Fellow in the Stallybrass mould – and Roman and Civil law lecturer and tutor Barry Nicholas, then Peter Birks, another Roman lawyer and sometime Regius Professor of Civil Law at All Souls, Harry Lawson, the first Professor of Comparative Law, and Sir Otto Kahn-Freund, an employment law specialist. There was also a growing reputation for English literature – staff Ian Jack and Alastair Fowler among them. Other notable staff included Robert Shackleton, tutor in French, sometime librarian and Senior Dean; Sir Ronald Syme, Camden Professor of Ancient History (the chair previously held by Last, with whom he would continue a personal dispute). It would all mean the Brasenose's fellows in 1970 were dominated by Britain's top academic minds, however disjunct from academic success that would become. One subject to develop after 1970, however, was Politics, Philosophy and Economics (PPE). Bogdanor continued to lead a formidable group of fellows and undergraduates: Peter J.N. Sinclair, Michael Woods, John Foster, and Tony Courakis; Lord Robin Janvrin, Kate Allen, Catharine Hill, and British Prime Minister David Cameron.

In the history department, Syme was succeeded by Peter Brunt. In the sciences, Dr John Barltrop was sometime Bursar; Bryan Birch, Professor of Arithmetic and co-author of the Birch and Swinnerton-Dyer conjecture; and Nicholas Kurti, Vice-President of the Royal Society. Overall, although the immediate post-war staff remained traditional – if not overly conservative in nature – with a third drawn from Brasenose itself, the late sixties signalled a change on this front. Then, a wave of new face emerged: among them, Laszlo Solymar (later Professor of Applied Electromagnetism), Vernon Bogdanor (Professor of Government), Robert Evans (Regius Professor of Modern History) and Graham Richards, Oxford's Chairman of Chemistry.

During Last's tenure, Brasenose had a very high number of undergraduates: a peak of 104 in 1949, second in the university. Results, however, were poor: two firsts in 1950, placing the college 18th. It was only near the end that things picked up, perhaps a result of Last's stern manner; there were 13 firsts in 1955. However, until 1970, they remained poor, with only a small increase on the pre-War years. Brasenose sat twenty-first in the Norrington Table in 1968, twenty-sixth in 1975, and twenty-seventh in 1980. It was into this that Hart made his reforms, to bring students closer to the governing body and make them responsible for more of their own care – cleaning and washing, for example. By 2001, Brasenose had climbed the tables once again, coming in third place in the Norrington Table with 30 firsts.

There were still sportsmen, though: A. W. Ramsay (future RFU President), Kenneth Spence and Pete Dawkins among a dwindling set of rugby players; Colin Cowdrey among the college's cricketers. There were no Brasenose men in the Varsity cricket team between 1972 and 1989, certainly a slide on previous times. In rowing, the decline was even more significant: sixteenth among colleges in 1964; twentieth in 1976. It was only in the 1990s that rowing would return to success, firstly with the women and then with the men. Outside sport, a young Jeffrey Archer successfully invited The Beatles to Brasenose, the peak of a fundraising campaign for Oxfam.

In the 1960s onwards, there was a certain progressiveness in the air, and the first women guests were admitted in 1964. Women members were first admitted to the 1974–1975 year. The college's first comprehensive-schooled student (Paul Barker) had arrived in 1955. It was also almost completely secular – with the exception of the chaplain and his deputies; the chaplain's role itself dominated by pastoral work. The students themselves concentrated more and more on the exams – marks improved across the university – but this left a class gulf between some staff and undergraduates, most visible in "gentlemanly" sports. Michael Palin and Robert Hewison were among new creative talent. Since the 1950s, over 70% of students were state-assisted, half of undergraduates drawn from state or direct grant schools, a figure very close to the university average. Brasenose merged entrance and scholarship exams in 1961, abolished closed scholarships in the decade after, and open entrance awards in 1984. Brasenose's traditional link with the north-west also floundered, although it is perhaps surprising that it lasted until the 1970s. In its place, there were more entrants, paying higher fees, from elsewhere in the world.

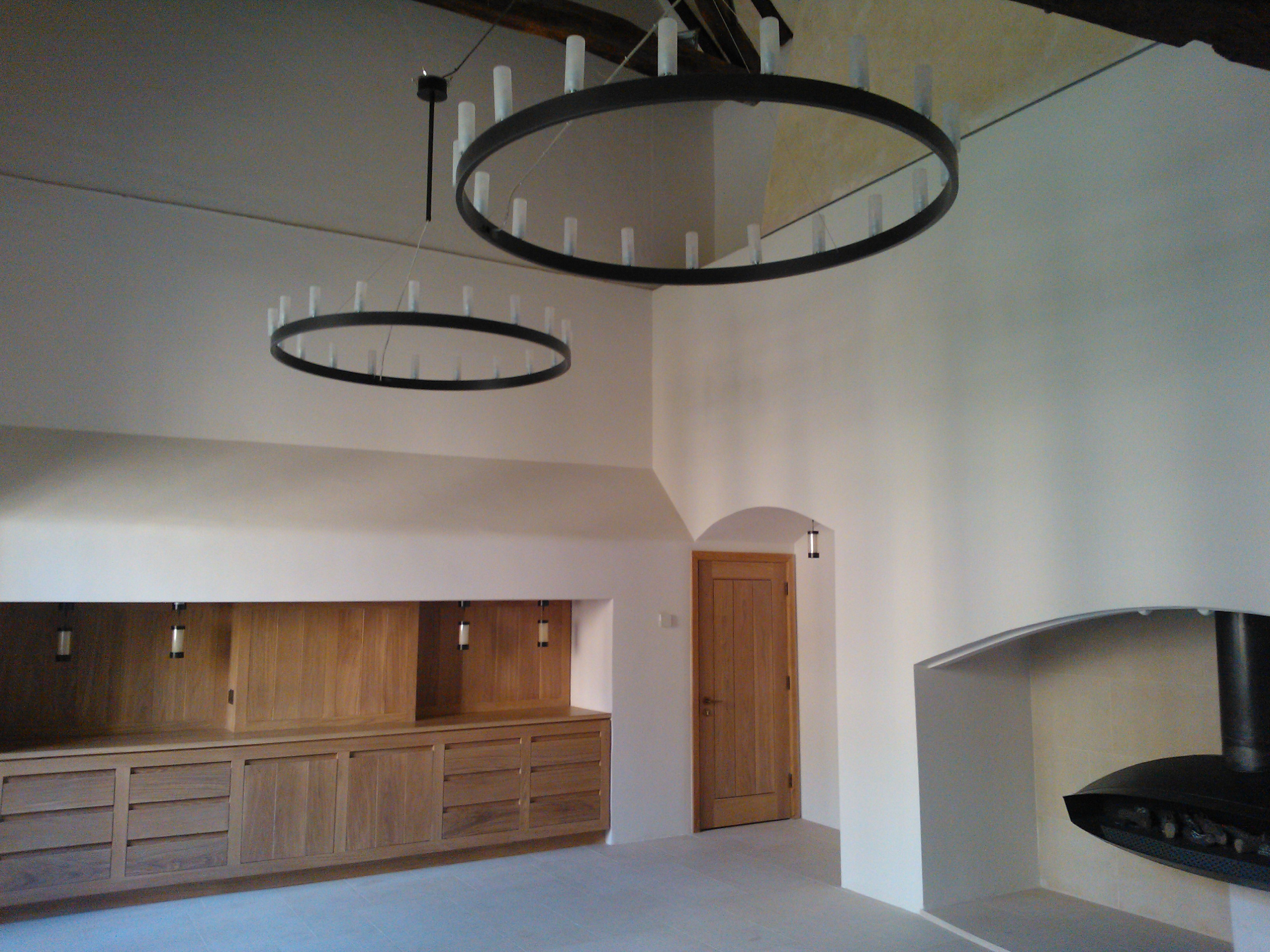
Brasenose's updated mediaeval kitchen, part of "Project Q"

The expectation had been since the 1920s that undergraduates would spend at least one of their years living in college; however, post-war expectations grew and Brasenose began another construction programme to ensure it could house students for longer. Designs were drawn up by Philip Powell and Hidalgo Moya, in a then-modern style. The new buildings cost £76,000 to design, housing 32 rooms, and forming staircases XVI, XVII and XVIII. The architecture, which has since come to be thoroughly disliked, was praised. The rather more popular rooms on the Frewin site were also constructed, at a total cost of £3 million, including commercial units. In 1996, the St Cross annexe was finished; in 1997 the final extensions to Frewin were completed, allowing the college to house all undergraduates for the duration of their course. Finances had been secured with a late revival, and accounts early in the twenty-first century showed a 6% surplus and a ranking of 13th out of 36th in endowment income.

== Twenty-first century ==
Professor Roger Cashmore, a particle physicist, became Brasenose's first scientist principal in 2003. He was replaced in 2011 by Alan Bowman, former Camden Professor of Ancient History. The area around the kitchen was rebuilt in 2010–2012, along with other changes to dining and some living rooms, in a series of building works known as the quincentenary building project or "Project Q".
