= Frewin =

Frewin may refer to:

== People ==
- Anthony Frewin (born 1947), writer and personal assistant to Stanley Kubrick
- George Frewin (born 1907), English professional footballer
- Greg Frewin (born 1967), Canadian illusionist and magician
- Richard Frewin (1681?–1761), English physician and professor of history

== Other ==
- Frewin Hall at St Mary's College, Oxford
