= Brasenose College Chapel =

Coordinates: 51.7529°N 1.2544°W

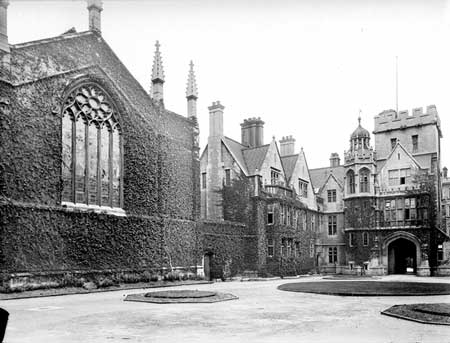
The New Quadrangle in 1900 (the chapel is on the left)

The Chapel of Brasenose College, Oxford, dedicated to St Hugh and St Chad, is a Grade I listed building dating from the seventeenth century and constructed during Brasenose's second wave of building, started under the principalship of Samuel Radcliffe. It is believed to have replaced an earlier chapel where the Senior Common Room now is, and includes items of silverware from around the date of foundation. The chapel is in a mixture of architectural styles – Gothic, neoclassical, and baroque – and has not proven uncontroversial for this reason. The current chaplain is The Reverend David Sheen.

Radcliffe having failed to start work during his lifetime, his will set aside money and instructions for the construction of the new chapel on the south side of the college. For this purpose materials were taken from college properties – particularly from St Mary's College, which provided the hammerbeam roof and other materials for the project. The chapel and library cost together £4,000 at a time when college income was £600 a year. Disputes over the will and other problems meant that work on the construction did not begin until 1656 (eight years after Radcliffe's death), and was managed by the college bursar. An "overseer" called John Jackson took control of the project, and is believed to be the chapel's primary designer. The chapel was consecrated in 1666, and must have been almost complete at that date.

Various alterations were made to the chapel after completion. Although repairs were undertaken in the meantime, the interior of the chapel was renovated (having fallen into a poor state) in 1819, and the exterior beginning in 1841. In 1892–3 a new organ was purchased and fitted, paid for by the then Principal Charles Buller Heberden; the current organ was installed in 1973, and rebuilt in 2002–3.

== Early history ==
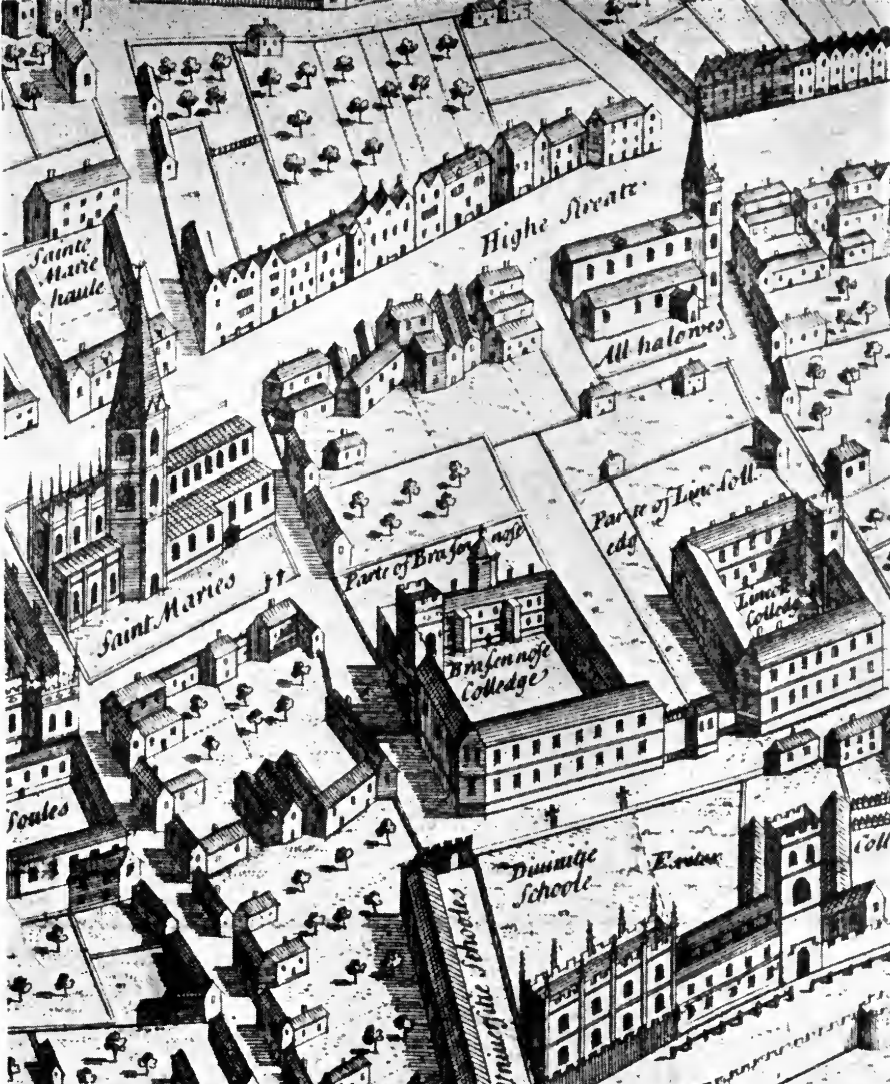
Detail from Ralph Agas's map of Oxford (surveyed 1578; engraved 1588), before the new chapel was built

The original buildings took some time to finish; only the original gateway was lavished upon from the beginning. The buildings were only of a modest splendour: the hall was not completed until the end of the seventeenth century; the rooms economically decorated without wood panelling; the main quadrangle only of one story and garrets. Although an earlier chapel is suspected, the area above Staircase I – now the Senior Common Room – was in use by 1521. It appears that the ecclesiastical furnishings promised by Smyth never arrived, and have been presumed taken by the college's first Visitor, Cardinal Wolsey. Although the chapel (or perhaps oratory) was plain, two chalices and two patens survived from the original three of each and have been identified as older than those of Corpus or Trinity, dating to the late fifteenth century.

The college successfully navigated through the reformation period, despite the fact that the college retained strong Catholic tendencies, and support for the reforms of Henry VIII and Edward VI was minimal. The chapel's dean, Thomas Hawarden, was opposed to the reforms, and was once called to the King's Privy Council to answer for his actions. Eventually, though, the continuing reforms were carried through; in particular, despite an exception for the University from the Act of Uniformity in 1549 for services other than mass, the enforcement of the Book of Common Prayer severely limited the ability of the college to maintain the old Catholic services whilst outwardly adopting the new reforms. The careful, and generally slow, path trod was exposed under Queen Mary, when five Fellows left the college over its failings to reinstate the full Catholic mass quickly enough. Under Thomas Blanchard and Richard Harris the college finally accepted the religious reforms, and, moving into the later sixteenth century the college was responsible for housing several important figures of Protestantism: John Foxe, publicist, Christopher Goodman, protégé of Peter Martyr, Nicholas Grimald and Alexander Nowell. Despite producing several Anglican and evangelical sympathisers, the college retained many Catholic sympathisers. Six Brasenose fellows were executed for their loyalty to the pope: John Shert, Thomas Cottam and Laurence Johnson at Tyburn in 1582, and Robert Anderson, Francis Ingleby and George Nichols thereafter, only smaller in number than St. John's.

Next to the Hall, westwards, and on the first floor, was the original chapel, now the Senior Common Room, entered from Staircase I through an ante-chapel, or "Outward Chapel" as it is called in the list of Room Rents. It had tracery windows both on the north and south sides, the marks of which may still be seen. Those towards the quadrangle have been replaced by sash windows, those to the south are now blocked up. From 1604 to 1612, £173 19s. 2d. on chambers over the library, seats in the chapel and other things, part of a system of works.

== Construction ==
The seventeenth century saw a second wave of building at Brasenose, started under the Principalship of Samuel Radcliffe. Under his leadership an attic story was added to Old Quad in the 1630s, and a new chapel and library both constructed between 1656 and 1666. The work totalled some £4,000, achieved eventually despite Brasenose's previous money problems; in comparison, in 1680 college income was a sustainable £600 a year.

=== Preliminary ===
Map of the college in 1900 (shaded) overlaying the approximate boundaries of the halls it expanded into, including Little St. Edmund Hall.

Having failed to achieve all his aims during his lifetime, in his will, read 24 April 1648, Radcliffe directs his executors:

to sell Piddington within 1 year, give one years profits to the poor of Rochdale. This should return £1500, of which £1000 to the Chapel, & the material of the Coll. tenement by the Starre, to make the south side of the Quadrangle, £600 for a building on pillars betw. Mr. Sixsmiths Chamber & the Small Hall of Edmund; this will make a walk under cover the great want of Brasenose.

"The Coll. tenement by the Starre" refers to St. Mary's College, situated to the west of Cornmarket Street, on the site of which Frewin Hall now stands; "the Starre" is now the site of the Clarendon Centre (once the Clarendon Hotel).

The college, accordingly, set to work to carry out the Principal's wishes. The sale of Piddington realized £1,850, two other legacies of £66 13s. 4d. and £15 respectively came in, and a subscription list shows that money continued to be given from time to time up to November 1671, when the total sum subscribed amounted to £4,775 4s. 4d. As well these legacies and subscriptions in cash, the college possessed a very valuable asset in the shape of the old buildings of St. Mary's College, which helped to keep costs down. This property was acquired in 1580 and in 1584 was let with the proviso that any unroofed buildings might be pulled down whenever required. In 1628, two masons and two carpenters viewed the buildings and other accessories which had been erected since it came into the hands of the college, and valued them at £1,480. Whether the college had any designs as to the ultimate fate of the chapel belonging to St. Mary's College before 1649 is unclear, but by this time its destruction was certainly planned, for the site was let to one John Kinge of the Inner Temple, reserving the right to "enter in with workmen and labourers, carts and horses, to pull down the old Chapel, and to carry away the materials to build the new Chapel according to the intencion of the last will and testament of Samuel Radcliffe". Even if a site for the new buildings had not been prescribed in the will, there would have been no difficulty in finding one. The college had rented since 1530 and now finally acquired both Little St. Edmund Hall and the large piece of garden separating it from William Smyth's buildings, a plot well suited for the formation of a small quadrangle, with a "covered walk" on one side. The chapel could very well take the place of St. Edmund Hall itself, then to be pulled down, and be connected with the rest of the college by the cloister or covered walk, to which the Principal attached so much importance.

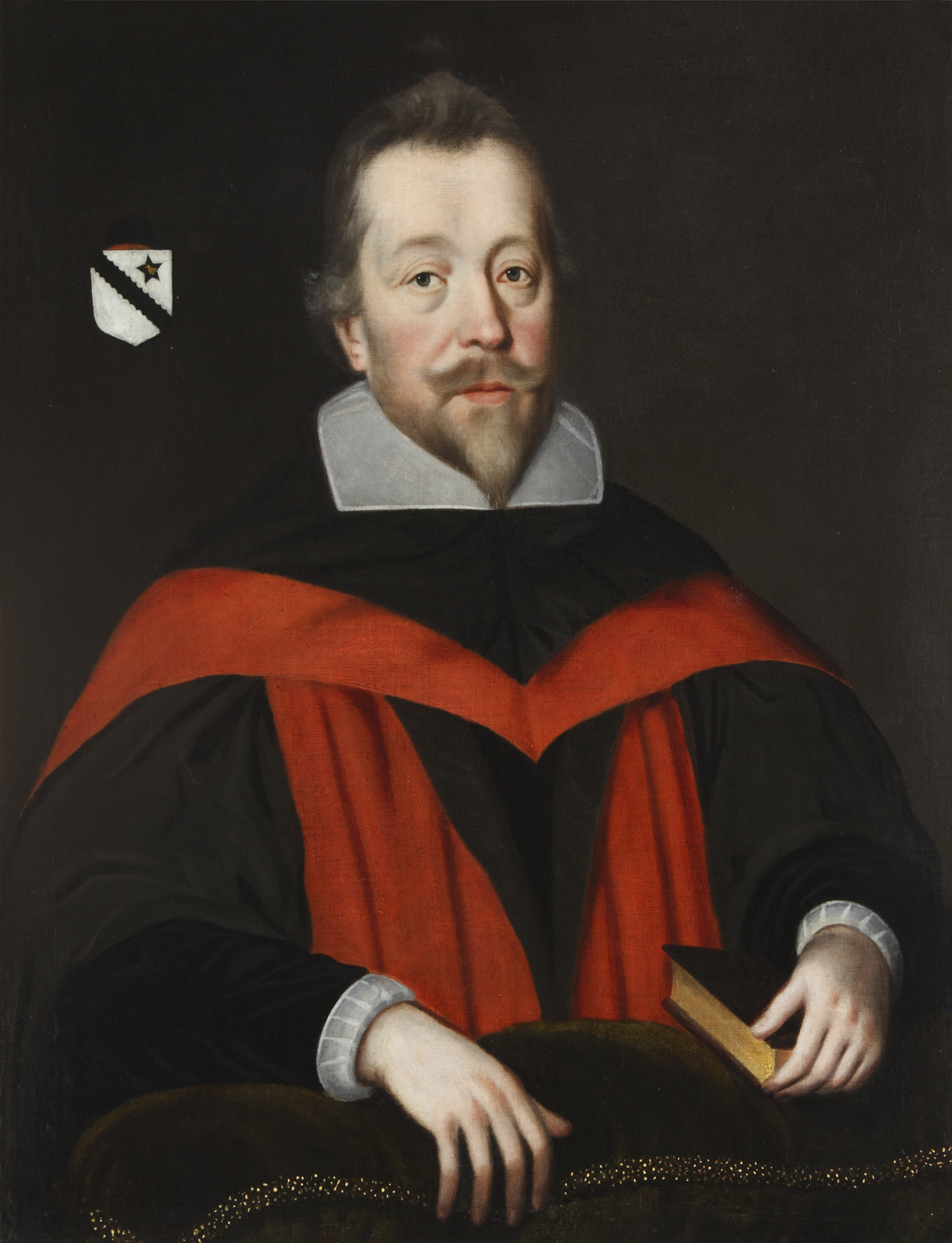
Samuel Radcliffe (d.1651), Principal. Arms: Argent, a bend engrailed sable with a mullet for difference. He failed to start work on the chapel during his lifetime; construction began eight years after his death.

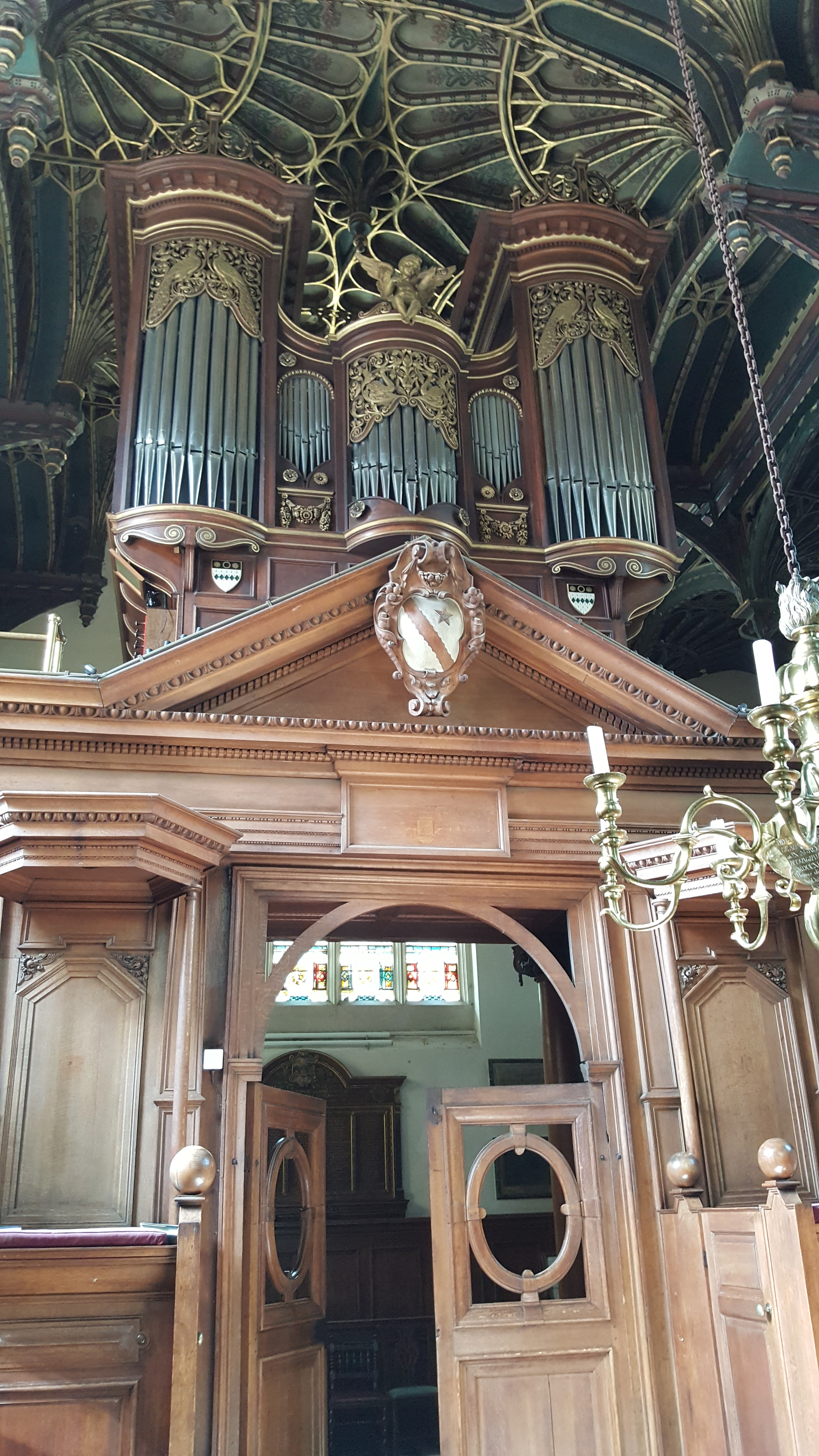
Screen, displaying arms of Samuel Radcliffe (similar to the screen in All Souls College, Oxford, showing the arms of Portman)

Both money and land, then, being provided, there seemed no reason why the work should not begin at once. Owing to various delays however, caused by disputes over the will, the sale of Piddington, the transfer of the site, and for various other reasons, an actual start was not made until 1656, so that eight years elapsed after the Principal's death before the preliminaries were all finally settled and operations could commence. The interval was employed in collecting timber and other material; when once begun, work went steadily forward without intermission until the chapel was close to complete. Preparations began soon after Principal Radcliffe's death, in 1651, when the selection and felling of timber in Mynchery Wood, the property of the college, was undertaken. The Bursar saw to this himself, and records his expenses: "given [that] day when I went to viewe [the] tymber to [the] 2 woodmen for their care 4s. and to [the] 6 workmen to drink 3s." Further items are given for felling and carting, and for sawing up at the college. By 9 July 1651 the last load of timber was drawn in, and all the carters received a "dinar and beverage bringing home [the] last timber from [the] woods to [the] college". Workmen's compensation is not forgotten: "to [the] poore man [that] had his leg broken in plucking down a tree 5s." In addition to all this, £84 was paid to Sir George Stonehouse for timber bought outright from him.

=== Work begins ===
It was not until 1656 that a real start on the chapel was made, when building operations began in earnest. The historical record of the construction, and the various problems that presented themselves, were recorded in a book entitled "The Book of Accounts for the New Buildings, in Brasenose College, in Oxford, begun Anno Dm 1656". Discovered in the Victorian era among the college's documents, it was originally the work of the then Bursar, Mr. Houghton, who seems to have had the entire management of the business side of the undertaking in his hands. His powers were formally recognized by the college on 4 November 1657, when it is decreed that Mr. Houghton to have sole charge of "finishing the new Chappell, and building a new Library upon a cloyster with buttresses ace. to ye modell and to receive such sumes of money as shall be issued out for that purpose out of the common chest for which he is to give an account to the Society once every month."

There was no contractor. The Bursar laid out the money thus entrusted to him in the purchase of materials, payment of wages, and so forth, and of all this the book is a complete and detailed record. Amounts paid for scaffold poles, stone, timber if required, tools, and all necessaries and materials for carrying out the work are put down. The names of all the workmen are entered, with their daily and weekly wages, notes are made of the important events during the progress of the works, such as the laying of the foundation stone of the chapel, the commencement of the cloister or library, and so on. Each page is totalled up, and signed by "Dan. Greenwood Pr[incipal]".

The practical part, the superintendence of the building operations, and all that now falls to the architect and his clerk of the works, were in the hands of a Mr. John Jackson, the "overseer" as he is called in the book. Jackson was the overseer of the buildings, receiving wages of 20s. per week, undertaking the work on 24 March 1655. He was seemingly important, responsible for the model for the chapel roof, and he subsequently gave evidence in court as to the cost of the building.

Preliminaries being settled, pulling down began in earnest, and the first entry in the accounts is for 22 March 1656, when baskets for the slatters, ladders, mattocks, and boards are bought, and 1s. 6d. a day and bevers (i.e. "lunch") are paid to the men for taking the slates off the old chapel at St. Mary's College. Then comes a very important item:

"P[ai]d y^{e} s^{d} Redheads & Quatermen (3 carts) in bringing y^{e} Roofe of y^{e} Old Chapple to y^{e} Coll: & alsoe y^{e} Scaffoldinge 2 days a piece at 6d. a cart & 3d. Bevers in all paid y^{tn} 1l. 17s. 6d."

The workmen received 3s. extra in all, on account of the dangerous character of the work. Subsequently we get an item "for building ye sheds for ye Roof of ye Chapple". Then comes "Rowling ye timber into ye church yard of S. Mary's", and by 26 April all the old roof was down. Then follows the pulling down of Little St. Edmund Hall.

On 24 May the first lot of freestone is brought, and very soon after this the foundations are begun:

"Foundacon of ye Chappie was layd on Wednesday ye 18 of June, 1656", this being the first stone, for shortly after comes M^{dum} y^{t} on Fryday [the] first of August: 1656 ye foundacon of our Chapple being 20 ft. deep one place with another, was then fully brought up and finisht."

Walling stone, "Scapeld Burr" at 12d. a load at the pit, lime, and Burford stone, are continually purchased, and from fourteen to twenty labourers at 12d. a day each and bevers, and from six to ten masons at 18d. a day and bevers, are regularly employed. The number of labourers, however, is shortly reduced, as soon as the digging for the foundations is completed.

The work must have gone forward at a good pace, for in October the carver gets £1 for carving "two lonick capitals" in Burford stone, also 7s. for the spandrels, probably those of the North doorway of the ante-chapel. In October £1 13s. 6d. is spent on "straw to thatch the chapel", and a load of clay is procured "to be dawbed upon the thatch", as a temporary roof, no doubt. One important item with regards to the design and style of the architecture was "[the] window james [jambs] from ye old Chapel" which appear in the records at this time.

In March 1657, "The Little Cloyster begun to be diggd", and at digging a foundation for "ye little lobby" the workmen receive 5s. at several times "to make them drink and continue their work longer than ordinary, by reason of ye often colting of ye mould", from which it appears that the trenches were in soft ground and had to be got out and filled in quickly. "Plancking stone" is mentioned, and some boards and poles are bought in London by Jackson, and conveyed by water to Oxford. A great deal of stone is used at this time, so the work must have been going on fast. In June 1657 the lead for the side cloister is bought, and in August old iron bars for the windows are worked up. Two cartloads of moss are drawn in for the chapel and some boards come from London by water to "ye High Bridge" (Hythe Bridge).

=== Approaching completion ===
By March 1658 when work commenced on the library, the chapel was probably well forward, as evidenced by the purchase of "Bottle creasts" from Burford, probably the urns over the buttresses. It is, however, difficult to arrive at the rates of progress of the work in any detail, from the fact that an entry in the book of payments for various materials does not necessarily mean that they were built into the work at the date of the entry. The smiths' work and ironwork came from Birmingham to Banbury by water, and thence to Oxford. In December 1657, when the last payment for ironmongery is made, Nathaniel Brokesby, the schoolmaster of Birmingham, who took great pains to secure these materials for the college, received two pairs of gloves with black fingers, and a pair of white "kid's leather" gloves.

The carving seems to have been completed by December 1658, for Symon White (who is evidently a superior workman, receiving 22d. a day, the highest wage paid to anyone, and who was the master carver) is no longer employed. No other carvers are mentioned, and as there is not a great deal of ornament, he may have done all the work himself, with the aid perhaps of his apprentices. Very probably he designed it also, and was, no doubt, trained in the new school of classic design, after the manner of Nicholas Stone, or any of the other carvers of that date, whose work could then be seen on St. Mary's Church porch, or elsewhere. Whether for temperance' sake or for other reasons bevers are now abated, and after this date John Jackson is not paid as overseer.

The college was now in the midst of the lawsuit with Ralph Reniger, and the Book of Accounts was shown to John Jackson and John Hopkins at their examination before the commissioners. The total amount paid over to Bursar Houghton at this time seems to have been £2,260, made up as follows, according to the entry, but Houghton having disbursed £2,341 0s. 6d. the remainder is stated as still due to him.

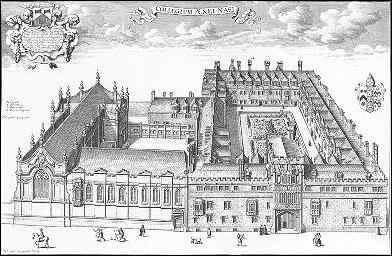
Illustration from 1675, showing the completed Chapel

Some long timbers are bought for the "new Roofe of the Chapel", and plastering to the roof began on 14 June 1659. The design of the chapel ceiling must have been decided before now, and it would seem to have required considerable elaboration and contrivance, for Jackson, on 5 November 1659, gets £20 "for his modell of the Roof of ye new Chapple, & his paynes taken about it, according to the agreement made before the undertaking of it". From this it is probably that some entirely new work was added to the old timbering, otherwise an elaborate model, costing £80 or so, would not have been necessary. Jackson was also entrusted with monies to pay for certain work done, including "the frontispiece over the cloister door being of Burford Stone, with [the] Kings arms on a shield" – the door being the one leading out into School Street (now Radcliffe Square).

Between the middle of June 1659 and August 1661 there are few entries in the records, indicative of only a little work taking place. By August 1661 the roof had been completed, and was then whitened. The interior of the building, however, had stood in the rough all this time, the ground had now to be levelled up, timber removed, and preparation made for the internal finishings. The panelling does not appear to have been put in till June 1662, when the joiners (who came from London) are paid and forty wainscots added at a cost of £63. Work went on for the rest of the year, £42 was spent on marbles, and the last item in the book is one of £23 for "wyre for the east, west, and north Windows", probably nettings to protect the glass.

At the end of April the book is balanced up, and signed by Thomas Yate, Principal; Radol. Rawson, Vice-Principal and others. The interior of the chapel, however, was not yet completed. A further payment was made to John Wyld, the joiner, of £50 in 1664, also £30 to Simon White, the carver, for marbles, in 1665. In 1666, White gets £52 for laying the marbles, and in the same year there is the account for fittings, cushions, and similar. All these bills were paid by the Bursar, but do not come into the Book of Accounts, and amounted to £81 18s. 11d. Everything must have been practically completed, however, by 1666, for in that year Walter, Lord Bishop of Oxford, performed the solemn act of consecration.

== History post-completion ==
=== Mid-Victorian and before ===
By the end of 1666, the new chapel and library were complete, fitted up, and in use by the college, and from now onwards very little change in the fabric itself is recorded. Various accessories and fittings have, however, been added by the college, or by various donors from time to time. The first of these was an extremely fine brass eagle, which now stands in the middle of the floor, given by Thomas Lee Dummer of Swatheling, Hants, in 1731. It is commemorated in an inscription on the globe on which the eagle stands, with Dummer's coat of arms and motto. It seems to have taken three days to fix, and stood on a stone slab 9 feet square. It was sent to London in 1734, possibly to be engraved, and on its return some new ironwork was put to the "aegle", and four men employed to fix it.

In 1733 Sir Darcey Levir, of Accrington, Lancashire, gave £50 towards a marble altarpiece, of which there is no further record at the time, but which is believed to be the most recent and which was restored in the late Victorian period. In 1748–9 some very elaborate furniture of crimson velvet, crimson damask curtains and a Wilton carpet, were provided for the communion table, costing £140 13s. 4d. in total. At this time the altar was railed off, and the item of "painting and gilding the ironwork to the altar rail £12 10s." suggests that the railings were of the elaborate scrollwork which was common at that date, as in All Saints Church, Oxford, or in the iron gates at All Souls College. They were taken down at some time before 1850, and apparently used to form the front of the seats against the north and south walls. The two gilt chandeliers, now hanging, were given by William Drake of Shardeloes, in 1749, but for twenty-three years (from 1865 to 1887) were in Coleshill Church. The building had by this time been exposed to the trying atmosphere of Oxford for nearly one hundred years, and consequently sundry external repairs were necessary from time to time to keep the fabric in proper condition. £350 is spent in new slating, timber, and lead, in 1779. Fourteen years later one of the ends is scaffolded, and the vases taken down. Decay seems to have gone on gradually, and in 1817 the east end is reported to be very perishable, having decayed to the depth of 3 or 4 inches from its former surface.

In 1819 the interior of the chapel was very extensively overhauled and done up, £201 being spent on cleaning and painting the ceiling and walls, and staining and twice varnishing the oak. The capitals of the reredos were re-gilt. A considerable sum was spent on repairs to the roof, and there is a note on the estimates for painting, that the "colour is so much injured by damp that it will require in many places to be painted four times over". Various repairs to the wainscot were also carried out, so it would seem that the building had suffered considerably from neglect. A bill was sent in at this time for "a flight of three oak steps carved at the sides, the top forming a platform, with carved balusters, the arms of the College on each side, the founder's arms in front, with a rich carved foliage ornament of vine leaves and wheat with ribbands". This elaborate stage was used for reading essays and declamations from, and was intended for the ante-chapel. It did not give satisfaction, apparently, for there is a note on the account: "?Will he take back his flight of steps, cumbersome and disproportionate to the chapel, and without anything to recommend it but the beauty of the carving below." Apparently he would not, as it had been ordered by the college and carried out, for the bill was paid in 1820. At the same time, new hangings and fittings are provided, crimson cloth, a new altar table, with turned and carved legs, a new carpet, cushions, kneelers, and covers costing over £610, so that the interior now must have been in perfect order.

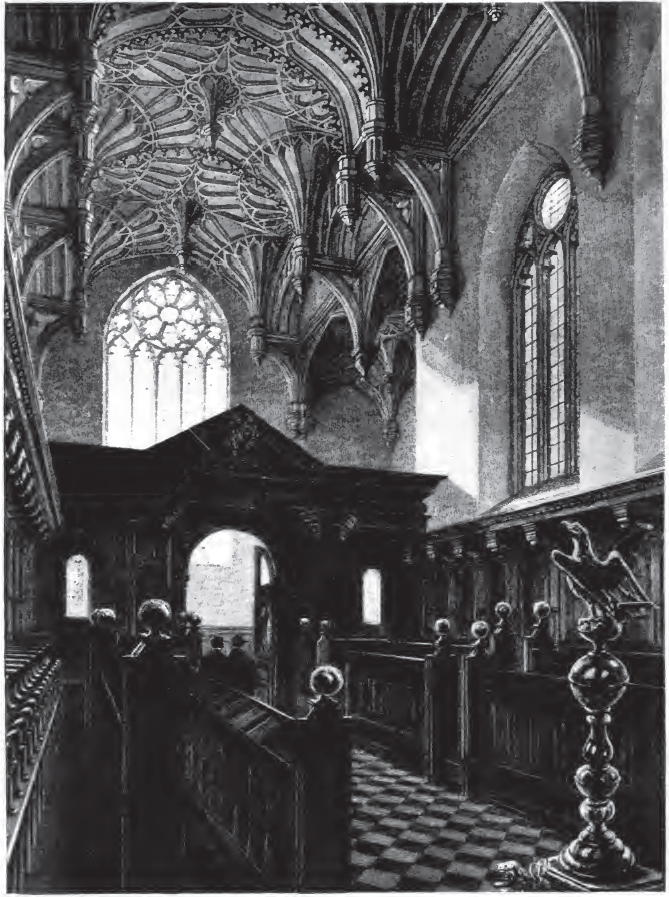
A sketch of the chapel in around 1835, showing the screen as it was before the addition of the organ near the end of the century

The exterior next demanded attention. The original stone used for ordinary facing work is not known, but it seems to have been a very unsatisfactory kind, probably from Headington. By 1841 it was in a very bad state of decay, and Philip Hardwick, the architect, who had contributed a design for the High Street front in his earlier days, was called in to report on the general condition of the chapel and library, as well as the rest of the college. His report said:

"The principal trusses of the roof of the Chapel are sound, of oak, and moulded. The queen posts have moulded bases, and have the appearance of having been used in a more ancient building. The roof was once stripped of stone slates, and new rafters and Welsh slates put. These are lighter, and thus the weight, which has pressed the walls outwards has been relieved. The groined ceiling, of wood and plaster, seems sound. Brackets and corbels are decayed. The walls are much perished, especially the south wall. Part of the cornice has been removed and wet has got in. The upper part of the wall is nearly 7 inches out of centre. Pinnacles and battlements are much perished... The Chapel to be done as soon as possible. The interior decayed work to be taken out, and the cornice, between the battlements, done in cement."

An estimate was prepared for all this work and amounted, including restoration of part of the old front up to the Tower, to £3,200. It was carried out in sections, with the east end of the chapel and library in 1845. The old tracery of the chapel and library windows, renewed during the restoration, was taken over to Denton House near Cuddesdon, where some alterations were made by a relative of the then Warden of All Souls. It was built into the wall surrounding the garden, the east window being set up entire. The south wall was left till 1848 and the ante-chapel until 1869, when plans were sent for refacing it in stone, and for restoring the pinnacles in Tainton stone, at the cost of £940 16s. This work was then carried out.

Previously to this, in 1859, a committee had been appointed to report on the internal condition and fittings of the chapel. Whether disrepair or the aversion of the Gothic Revivalists to the old Georgian fittings prompted this movement is not apparent, but Buckler's report would suggest that his leanings are certainly in the direction of reform, though he does not advise any very drastic change. The walls and roof were to be painted the same colour, the panels of the roof painted brilliant blue, the edges of the ribs to be gilded, and the sides coloured vermilion. One bay, over the altar, was to be coloured in this manner, as a trial. The marble screen at the east end was to be re-polished and re-gilded. The altar dais and steps and also the rest of the chapel floor was to be paved with Minton's tiles, using for the latter as much of the black and white marble as remained, and the panelling to be darkened and varnished. The Portland stone paving of the ante-chapel was to be renewed, leaving the gravestones, and the platform on which the eagle stood altered. The ante-chapel must have been then seated throughout, as it was proposed to remove the seats, leaving only the seat along the wall at the south end. A new altar was also suggested, and new furniture and gas standards. How much of this proposed work was actually carried out is unclear.

=== Late Victorian and onwards ===
The present glass in the windows is considered of no great antiquarian or artistic interest; the east window, completed in the nineteenth century, is a possible exception. It was with this in mind that the decoration of the interior and the stained glass in the windows were considered in 1886 in a report on the Wordsworth Memorial. The report suggested that the glass was dark and heavy; that elaborate decoration was of no use owing to the darkness of the building, and more light should be let in. It suggested a wall decoration of arabesques and a new and complete scheme of windows, with figures on a clear ground, like those in Trinity College Chapel. A complete series of windows on one comprehensive scheme in harmony with the architecture and decoration is no doubt what every building wants for its artistic completion, but sentiment is apt to intervene when the removal of the memorials of past worthies is suggested.

In 1892–93, a new organ was purchased for the chapel by then-Principal Charles Heberden. Heberden's own personal commitment to the church came despite being Brasenose's first lay Principal. After the possibility of placing it in a recess to be formed in the north wall of the sanctuary had been considered, it was eventually placed over the existing screen. Pillars in the ante-chapel were added to support the organ gallery. Principal Heberden was also largely responsible for the restoration and repair in 1902 of the marble reredos, which had fallen into a bad condition.

The whole was carefully taken down as far as the surbase and thoroughly overhauled. As much of the old work as it was possible to save was used again, some of the pilasters being rubbed down and repolished. Panels, frames, the columns next the centre, and all defective parts, were replaced with new. The panelling and seats, now stripped of their varnish, are the original work, except that a third row was added in 1884, though an addition to the screen was made when the organ was erected. The ceiling was recoloured in 1895 by Charles Eamer Kempe, a move which has been both extensively praised and criticised; one commenter in the 1970s remarked that "anything as strange and curious as Arts and Craft aestheticism overlaid on seventeenth-century fake Gothic, which in turn disguises a genuine fifteenth-century hammer-beam roof is certainly worth keeping - if only for the sheer zaniness of it all".

=== Modern ===
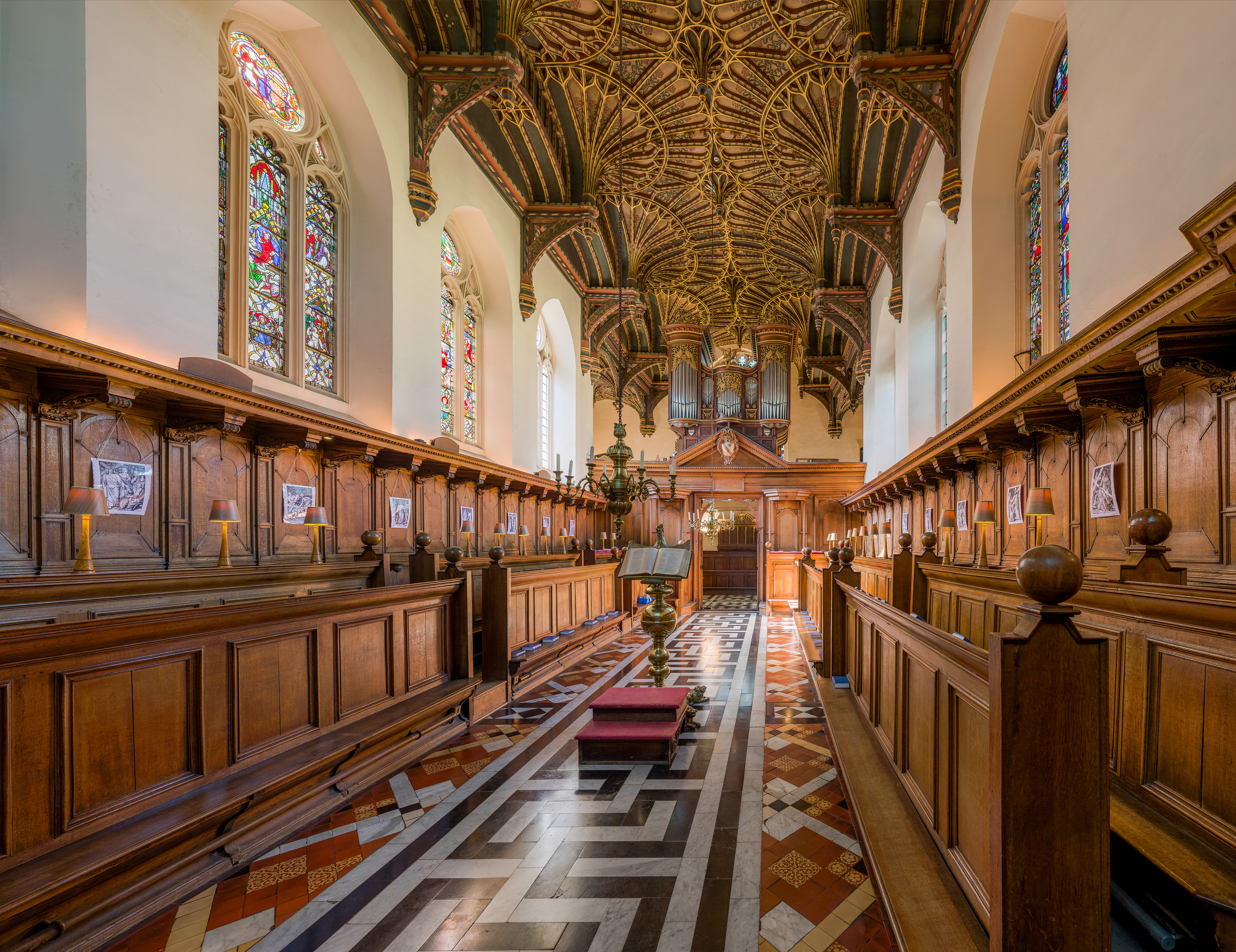
The chapel in 2015

The current organ was originally installed in 1973, although it is still housed in the old late Victorian organ case. It was rebuilt in 2002–3, with additions and re-fittings. The current chapel is open to members of all denominations. The current chaplain is Reverend David Sheen, who also serves in a pastoral capacity. The chapel also houses a portrait and a painting of one hand of the Childe of Hale, described in contemporary sources as man of 9 foot 3 inches in height. This recalls a visit to the college on his return from a visit to London in 1617.

== Design style ==
The chapel, in particular, was a mix of architectural styles – Gothic Revival and baroque. The chapel is mixture of late Gothic tracery, Renaissance swags of fruit and foliage, cherubs and cusps, fan-vaulting and Corinthian capitals. In the first place there was the old chapel of St. Mary's College, the roof and window jambs of which were used up again in the new building. The date of this chapel is not quite certain. It may have been as early as 1440, or even before that date; it was certainly completed by 1536. It would in any case have been in late Perpendicular Gothic, with tracery windows, and had the hammer-beam roof, now over the new chapel. Gothic traditions lingered on in Oxford longer than anywhere else: Trinity College Hall, with its Perpendicular windows was built in 1610; Wadham College also in 1610; Thomas Bodley's additions to the Bodleian Library, and the old Schools, were finished in 1613. At the same time the new school of the Renaissance was emerging, in its later and more classical phase, with its carvers trained in the school of Inigo Jones, Nicholas Stone, and others, who had already done work in Oxford, at St. Mary's porch, the Oxford Botanic Gardens, and elsewhere. At the time of the chapel's construction there were thus competing styles. It is the mixture of styles that has attracted most of the criticism.

During the period that Brasenose Chapel was being constructed, the old Gothic or early Renaissance master craftsman, or master builder, was disappearing and the architect, planner and designer was beginning to take his place. The role of the architect, pioneered by Inigo Jones, did not attain his full strength in the United Kingdom until the time of Sir Christopher Wren and his successors. With regards the Brasenose project, there is no appointed architect; instead John Jackson gets £1 a week as an "overseer". In the absence of an alternative, it is probable that the design is his. On the one he was trained in the new school, but on the other was hampered by the necessity of using up the materials of the old chapel and he had not the authority, if he had the strength of conviction, to throw aside the old manner.

The plan of the chapel holds to the Gothic tradition of the T form, but the proportions of the interior, the arrangement of bays and buttresses outside, and the carving, are distinctly classical. Perhaps it was difficult owing to the disturbed state of the country to get carvers outside Oxford; in any case he had to use up old material. For some reason or other, perhaps because it contains swags and Classic capitals, it has been attributed to Sir Christopher Wren. Certainly he was in Oxford in 1656, not being elected to the Gresham Professorship till 1657, but from then onwards he spent most of his time in London, and probably did not return till his election to the Savilian Professorship in 1661. It is possible that he was interested in the matter, as an amateur: his father had very strong architectural leanings, and may have imbued his son with like interests: but there is absolutely no evidence in support of the theory, nor is there anything to show that he had any interest in architecture before his appointment to the post of Assistant Surveyor General in 1662, when the chapel was practically completed. Beyond details of carving, there is little resemblance to his work, and the building lacks the unity and feeling for proportion and scale which are the chief characteristics of Wren's style.

Several works in the Classic manner, attributed to Inigo Jones, or to his carver, Nicholas Stone, had been executed twenty years before in Oxford, and the chapel has much more in common with the Porch of St. Mary's Church than with anything that Wren ever did. One historian, T. G. Jackson, in his book on St. Mary's Church, reviewing the question of the authorship of the Porch, quotes an entry by Wood to the effect that a "Mr. Jackson" received £22 more than his bargain for the erection of the porch, and suggests that Mr. Jackson was the "builder". It is therefore possible this was the same designer as Brasenose chapel.

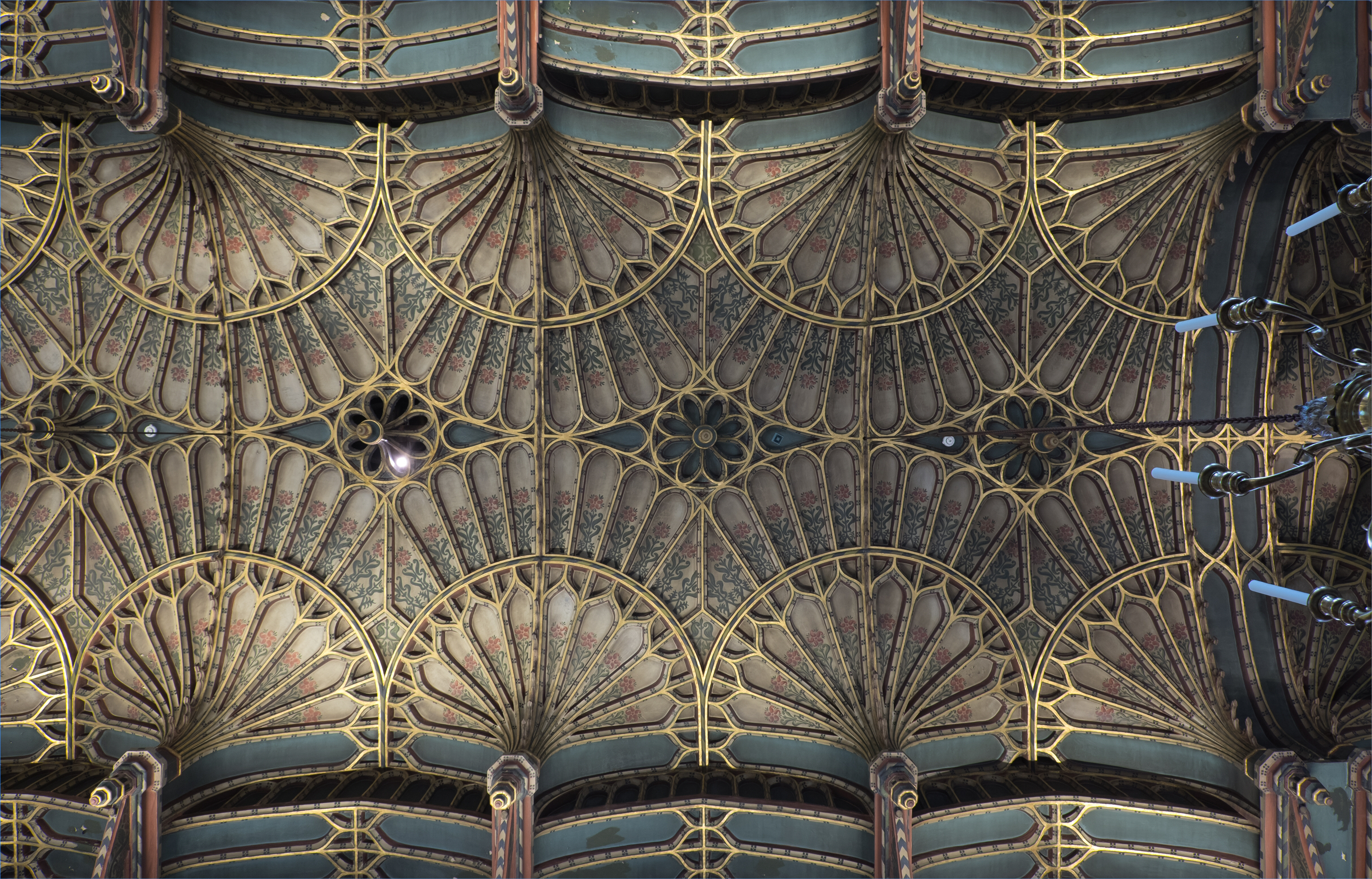
The ceiling in 2017

The Interior, except for its screen, has more congruity; the tracery of the windows and the Gothic network of the roof bear one another company, and are only disturbed by the proportions of the whole, which have more of Trinity Chapel than is in keeping with the interior of a building in the Perpendicular style. This same roof, or rather ceiling, has given rise to much speculation, and in almost every book on the chapel you find it stated that it came from St. Mary's College, and that it does not fit the building. This, however, is true only in part. The facts appear to be these. The old chapel of St. Mary's College possessed a fine open-timbered hammer-beam roof. When this was pulled down the roof was transported and housed, not in St. Mary's Churchyard, but in the college, under sheds, till the walls were ready to receive it. It was then put up over the new chapel, one of the hammer-beams being secured with irons. The trusses were carefully spaced out to suit the windows and the length of the antechapel, which is so proportioned that it is equal, from east to west, to two bays of the chapel itself, there being a very narrow strip over the organ, with a pair of brackets on either side, instead of one. This is not due to a misfit, but is intentional, otherwise the key of the vault at the centre of the bay would not come opposite the centre of the window. The brackets, which are all that can be seen of the old roof, do not come exactly in the centre of the piers between the windows, possibly because the windows are not opposite one another, or more probably because the old trusses had become distorted in moving.

But, for some reason or other, an open-timbered hammer beam roof was not wanted, probably a decision made from the first, since the trusses are spaced to suit the existing vault exactly. Jackson was therefore instructed to prepare a model for the new roof, for which he received £20, and he accordingly designed a fan-vaulted ceiling, of wood and plaster, to be put up beneath the old hammer-beam roof, and securely fixed to it. And very ingeniously he did it. The points of the hammerbeams gave him the line for his pendents, the great feature of the later fan-vaulted roofs. From these the ribs of the vaulting spring, and between them he shaped his ceiling in the ordinary way, after the manner of that at Windsor, for example. The hammer-beams themselves gave him a springing for short, low pitched tunnel vaults, running north and south, to connect the wall above the window heads with the rest of his vaulting. These are stepped, so to speak, and in two levels. If he had run his tunnel vault through at one level, the crown of it would have run out high above the head of the windows, and necessitated a gable over each window. The hammer-beams and the brackets below them are left to show below the new vault, and are ingeniously worked into the design. All the rest of the old roof is up above, and out of sight. The effect of the whole is successful, and not out of keeping with the windows. A glance at the photograph of the interior will explain the arrangement, which is very difficult to make clear with words only. The design is almost identical with that of the stone vault over the Choir of the Cathedral, the great stone bracket pieces there taking the place of the hammer-beam supports, while the tunnel vaults run through at one level.

This ceiling was done at the time the new chapel was built. It would not have been possible to remove a wood and plaster ceiling entire, or even in pieces, and re-erect it, and there would have been no need for an expensive model if the old vaulting had been in the college, ready to put up again. Also, the entry of 18 June 1659, "began to plaster the Chapel roof" which, doubtless, refers to the panels of plaster between the wood ribs. It may be objected that this is very late for a fan-vaulted roof, and so it would be anywhere but in Oxford. The fan-vaulting in St. Mary's Porch was done in 1637, and the great fan-vaulted staircase at Christ Church was not done until 1640. So there is no reason at all why it should not have seemed quite the natural thing to cover even a partially Renaissance building in this manner, especially one with so much Gothic feeling about its windows.

== See also ==
- History of Brasenose College, Oxford
