= Matthew Smyth (principal) =

Matthew Smyth (died 6 February 1547 or 1548) was the first Principal of Brasenose College, Oxford.

== Early life and education ==
Matthew Smyth or Smith was born in Lancaster. One of his contemporary relations, Gilbert Smith, held the Archdeaconry of Peterborough. Matthew Smith began his Bachelor of Arts degree at Oxford (Oriel College) in 1501; he was a Fellow of Oriel from 1506 to 1512. Ralph Churton said that Smith is frequently documented as a regent Master from 1509 onward. In 1545, he was named Bachelor of Divinity.

== Brasenose ==
Smith then became Principal of Brasenose Hall on 24 August 1510. He remained so until his death in 1547/8, serving during the foundation of Brasenose as a College. He was recorded as the "Principal of the College and Hall of Brasen Nose" in 1514. (One other former Principal of Brasenose Hall, John Formby, held a similar title during the transition period.) Falconer Madan, a Fellow of Brasenose and later Librarian of Bodleian Library, suggested in a 1909 "Quatercentenary" reflection that the continuity established by Smith proceeding from the administration of Brasenose Hall to presiding over Brasenose College is unique among other Oxford colleges.

As Principal, Smith presided over a college of twelve Fellows, six senior and six junior (including a Vice-Principal and Bursar), as well as 60 or 70 students. His responsibilities included providing surety for university students committing infractions, as recorded in the Registrum Cancellarii for a student named "Hastyngs" in August 1512. During this time, Smith also received various preferments for positions in the Anglican Church.

Sources conflict on whether William Smyth, a co-founder of Brasenose College, was definitely related to Matthew Smith/Smyth and therefore granted him the position through nepotism. Churton wrote in an 1800 biography of William Smyth:

Matthew Smyth, the first Principal of Brasen Nose college, is intitled[sic] to a place here by his personal merits and probable kin to the Founder, though none of the pedigrees of the family, which I have seen, acknowledge him; not have I been able, from any other quarter, fully to authenticate the fact.

== Death and legacy ==
Smith died on 6 February 1547/8 and was buried in Oxford at St. Mary's.

Smith's will is dated 11 December 1547. In it, he named two executors: his nephew William Smith (parson of Barton in the Clay) and the then prominent Robert Morwent (second President of Oxford's Corpus Christi College). Matthew Smith left some property in Sutton, Lancashire to his nephew Baldwin Smith on the condition that they support the "Usher" of Farnworth School with 20 shillings a year. He also gave lands to his own Brasenose College as income to support a scholar from Smith's home region (born near either Farnworth or Prescot).

== Notes ==
Academic offices
Preceded by none	Principal of Brasenose College, Oxford; 1512–1548	Succeeded by John Hawarden
