= List of principals of Brasenose College, Oxford =

The head of Brasenose College, University of Oxford, is the principal. The current principal is Alyson King, who took up the appointment in October 2026.

== List of principals of Brasenose College ==
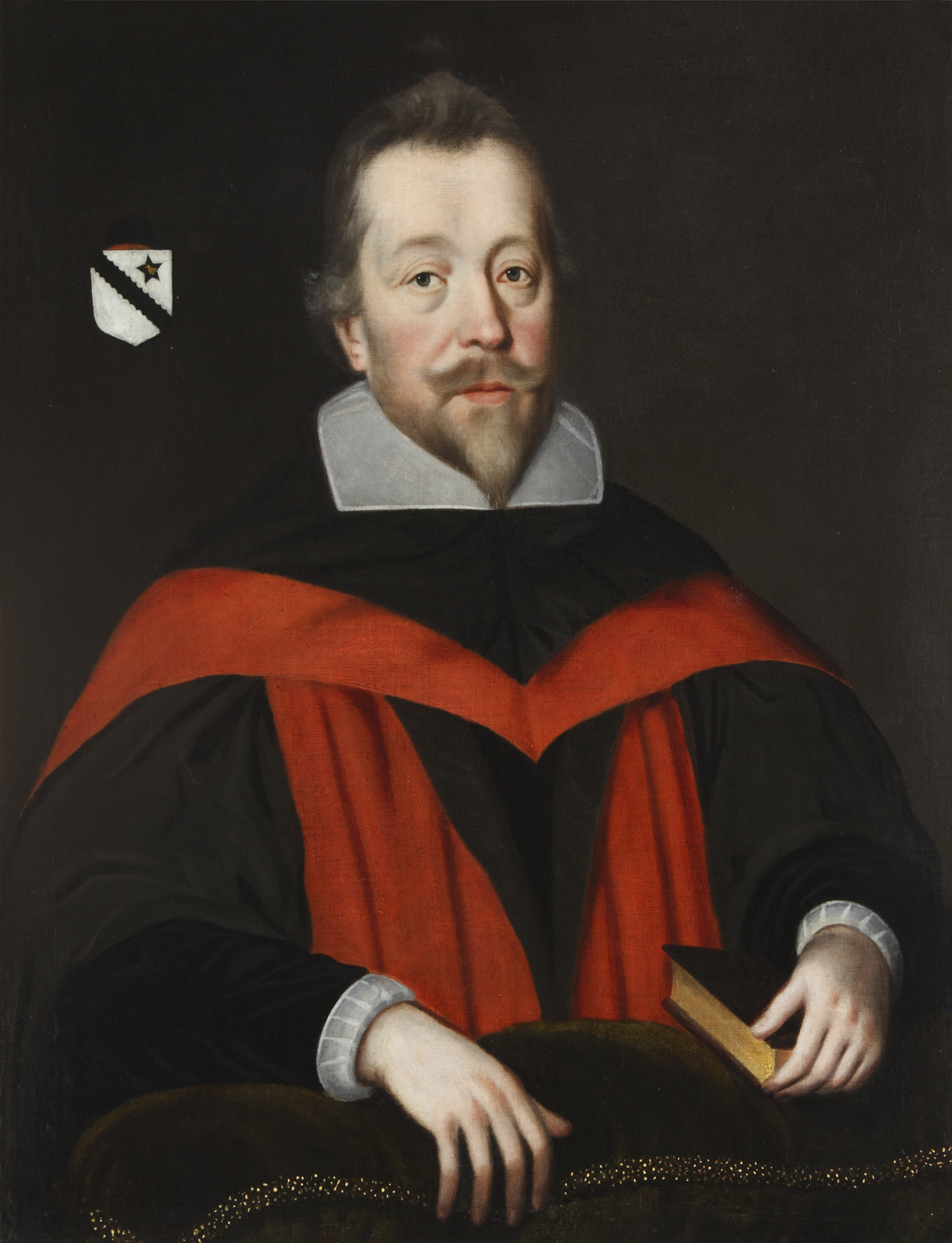
Samuel Radcliffe served as principal of Brasenose College, Oxford for 34 years.

Name	From	To	Notes
Matthew Smyth	1512	1548	First principal; died in office
John Hawarden	1548	1565	
Thomas Blanchard	1565	1574	
Richard Harris	1574	1595	
Alexander Nowell	1595	1595	
Thomas Singleton	1595	1614	Died in office
Samuel Radcliffe	1614	1648	Ejected by Parliamentary visitors 20 January 1648, but remained at Brasenose; died 26 June 1648
Daniel Greenwood	1648	1660	Parliamentary appointee, 29 February 1648
Thomas Yate	1660	1681	Elected 13 July 1648, in opposition to Greenwood; restored 10 August 1660; died in office
John Meare	1681	1710	Died in office
Robert Shippen	1710	1745	Died in office
Francis Yarborough	1745	1770	Died in office
William Gwyn	1770	1770	Died in office, four months after election
Ralph Cawley	1770	1777	Died in office
Thomas Barker	1777	1785	Died in office
William Cleaver	1785	1809	
Frodsham Hodson	1809	1822	Died in office
Ashurst Gilbert	1822	1842	
Richard Harington	1842	1853	Died in office
Edward Hartopp Cradock	1853	1886	Died in office
Albert Watson	1886	1889	
Charles Buller Heberden	1889	1920	
Charles Henry Sampson	1920	1936	Died in office
William Stallybrass	1936	1948	Died in office
Hugh Last	1948	1956	
Maurice Platnauer	1956	1960	
Noel Frederick Hall	1960	1973	
Herbert Hart	1973	1978	
Barry Nicholas	1978	1989	
David Hennessy, 3rd Baron Windlesham	1989	2002	
Roger Cashmore	2002	2011	
Alan Bowman	2011	2015	
John Bowers	2015	2026	
Alyson King	2026		First woman to hold the role
