= G. C. Smith =

G. C. Smith may be:

- Green Clay Smith, (1826-1895), American Civil War officer and politician
- Gilbert C. Smith, fl. 1870-1895, Mississippi politician
- George C. Smith (Mississippi politician), fl. 1870s
