= Thomas Blanchard =

Thomas Blanchard may refer to:

- Thomas Blanchard (academic), early principal of Brasenose College, Oxford
- Thomas Blanchard (inventor) (1788–1864), American inventor
- Thomas Blanchard Stowell (1846–1927), American educator
- Thomas Blanchard (actor) (born 1980), French actor
