= Hawarden (disambiguation) =

Hawarden may refer to:

== Places ==
- Hawarden, Wales
- Hawarden, Iowa, United States
- Hawarden, New Zealand
- Hawarden, Saskatchewan, Canada

== People ==
- Clementina Hawarden, Anglo-Irish Victorian photographer
- Edward Hawarden, English Roman Catholic theologian
- John Hawarden (fl. 1548–1565), Oxford college principal
- Tim Hawarden, South African astrophysicist

== See also ==
- Viscount Hawarden, Title of the Irish Peerage derived from the Hawarden estates in County Tipperary
