= Alyson King =

British diplomat (born 1976)

Alyson King OBE

Principal of Brasenose College, Oxford
- Incumbent
- Assumed office October 2026
- Preceded by: John Bowers

British Ambassador to the Democratic Republic of the Congo
- In office April 2023 – May 2026
- Monarch: Charles III
- Prime Minister: Rishi Sunak; Keir Starmer
- Preceded by: Emily Maltman
- Succeeded by: Zoë Ware

Personal details
- Born: Alyson Ruth Grace King; 2 January 1976 (age 50)
- Spouse: Ayman Jarjour
- Children: 2
- Education: Brasenose College, Oxford (MA); Columbia University (MIA, LLM); King's College London (LLM)

Alyson Ruth Grace King OBE (born 2 January 1976) is a British diplomat, lawyer and academic administrator who has served as Principal of Brasenose College, Oxford from October 2026. She is the first woman to hold the position of Principal since the college's foundation in 1509.

Before this she was the British Ambassador to the Democratic Republic of the Congo since April 2023, and ex officio non-resident Ambassador to the Republic of the Congo and the Central African Republic.

King's career has encompassed private legal practice at Davis Polk & Wardwell in New York and London, legal advisory roles in Brussels and London on international law and EU law, conflict resolution work in Sudan, and senior policy and diplomatic positions across the European Commission, the Foreign Office, and the Scotland Office.

== Early life and education ==
King was born on 2 January 1976, and grew up in Scotland. She went up to Brasenose College, Oxford, graduating with a first class Bachelor of Arts (BA) degree in jurisprudence; as per tradition, her BA was promoted to a Master of Arts (MA Oxon) degree. She graduated from Columbia University in 1999 with a Master of Laws (MA) degree in international law from Columbia Law School and a Master of International Affairs (MIA) degree from the School of International and Public Affairs (SIPA). She later earned a further Master of Laws (LLM) degree in EU law by distance learning from King's College London in 2009.

== Legal career ==
After completing her studies at Columbia, King worked as an associate at the American law firm Davis Polk & Wardwell in both its New York and London offices. She was admitted to the New York State Bar in 2000 and qualified as a solicitor in England and Wales in 2003. Earlier in her career, she had also undertaken work at Slaughter and May and Clifford Chance in London, as well as at the Andean Commission of Jurists in Lima, the United Nations headquarters in New York, and the Center for Economic and Social Rights. She also undertook volunteer teaching in Guatemala, election observation in El Salvador, and TEFL work in Gaza.

== Diplomatic career ==
=== Early roles ===
King joined the Foreign and Commonwealth Office (FCO) as a legal adviser, working on international law and EU law in both Brussels and London. She served at the UK Permanent Representation to the EU in Brussels as a legal adviser.

She was later seconded to the European Commission as a national expert, where she worked on sanctions and conflict diamonds. She represented the EU in the Kimberley Process, the international certification scheme established to prevent the trade in conflict diamonds. During this period, she negotiated a resolution in the United Nations General Assembly and reported to a United Nations Security Council committee, contributing to the unanimous Security Council vote to lift a six-year ban on Liberian diamond exports.

King served as Head of the Political Section at the British Embassy in Khartoum, Sudan, where she was involved in conflict resolution work. Back in London, she led the FCO's bilateral relations with 17 countries in northern and central Europe as well as the Republic of Ireland, and worked on EU institutional policy and staffing and the FCO's work on devolution. She subsequently served as the British government's Arabic spokesperson and senior regional communicator for the Middle East and North Africa (MENA), based in Dubai in the United Arab Emirates. She later served as deputy director of Policy in the Scotland Office from 2016 to 2017.

=== Deputy Head of Mission, Beirut ===
From January 2020, King served as Deputy Head of Mission at the Embassy of the United Kingdom in Beirut, Lebanon. She took up the post two months before the COVID-19 pandemic began and oversaw the embassy's transition to remote operations. On 4 August that year, she was acting as chargé d'affaires when the Beirut port explosion occurred, one of the largest non-nuclear explosions in history. King led the embassy's crisis response, coordinating the evacuation of diplomatic families, medical assistance for injured staff, and liaison with London. All British Embassy staff survived, though the embassy and all diplomatic residences sustained significant damage.

=== Ambassador to the Democratic Republic of the Congo ===
In January 2023, it was announced that King had been appointed His Majesty's Ambassador to the Democratic Republic of the Congo, succeeding Emily Maltman. She took up the post in April 2023 and presented her credentials to President Félix Tshisekedi. She is additionally accredited ex officio as non-resident Ambassador to the Republic of the Congo and the Central African Republic.

As Ambassador, King has overseen a bilateral official development assistance programme of over £105 million per year and an embassy of more than 100 staff across two locations, including a conflict, stability and security post in Goma. She has been involved in supporting regional peace processes in response to the ongoing conflict in eastern DRC, including the activities of the M23 armed group, and has spoken publicly in support of increased Chevening scholarship places for Congolese students.

In January 2026, it was announced that Zoë Ware would succeed King as Ambassador in May 2026.

== Principal of Brasenose College, Oxford ==
On 12 March 2026, it was announced that King had been elected as principal of Brasenose College, Oxford, succeeding the retiring John Bowers KC, who had held the post since 2015. She took office in October 2026. King is the first woman to be elected principal of Brasenose in the college's history, which dates back to 1509, and is the first principal to have been an alumna of the college since Barry Nicholas, head of the college from 1978 to 1989. The vice-principal, Professor Anne Davies, described the selection process as "competitive and thorough" and said that King had "impressed with her vision, her ability to connect and her desire to understand what the College means for all its members".

== Honours ==
King was appointed an Officer of the Order of the British Empire (OBE) in the 2021 Birthday Honours for services to British foreign policy. She received the insignia at Windsor Castle in June 2022.

== Personal life ==
King is married to guitarist Ayman Jarjour; they have two children. She is a marathon runner, having participated in the Congo River Marathon in Kinshasa. In addition to English, she speaks French, Spanish and Arabic.

Diplomatic posts
Preceded by Emily Maltman	British Ambassador to the Democratic Republic of the Congo; 2023–2026	Succeeded by Zoë Ware as Designate
Academic offices
Preceded by John Bowers	Principal of Brasenose College, Oxford; 2026-present	Incumbent
