= List of honorary fellows of New College, Oxford =

This is a list of Honorary Fellows of New College, Oxford.

- Sir Michael Atiyah
- Nicolas Barker
- Katharine Birbalsingh
- James Bowman
- Peter Brown
- Shona Brown
- Sir David Butler
- Thomas P. Campbell
- Sir Suma Chakrabati
- Sir Roger Elliott
- Henry Forster, 1st Baron Forster
- Andrew Garrad
- Sir John Gieve
- Robert Goff, Baron Goff of Chieveley
- Hugh Grant
- Irfan Habib
- Christopher Hampton
- David Hannay, Baron Hannay of Chiswick
- Tony Honoré
- Michael J. Hopkins
- Ioan James
- Nicola Lacey
- Dame Hermione Lee
- Sir Christopher Llewellyn Smith
- Sir David Lumsden
- Neil MacGregor
- Sir Jeremy Morse
- Anna Christina Nobre
- Alice Oswald
- Beresford Parlett
- Maurice Platnauer
- Sir Curtis Price
- Rachel Reeves
- Susan Rice
- Sir Bernard Rix
- Neil L. Rudenstine
- Alan Ryan
- Sir John Stephenson
- Marc Tessier-Lavigne
- Sir Nicholas Underhill
- Sara Weller
- Sir Peter Westmacott
- Stanley Whittingham
- John Edgar Wideman
