= Harriet Cradock =

English author

Lady Harriet Grove Cradock (née Lister; 1809 in Staffordshire – 1884 in Oxford) was an English writer, best remembered for her novels Anne Grey (1834), Hulse House (1860), John Smith (1878), and Rose (1881). Her first novel was edited by her brother Thomas Henry Lister. She served as maid of honour to Queen Victoria from 1837 to 1844. She was the wife of Edward Hartopp Cradock.
