= Thomas Blanchard (academic) =

Thomas Blanchard was the third Principal of Brasenose College, Oxford

Blanchard was born in York. He held livings at Speen, Boxford, (Note: The source simply says Boxford; it is unclear is this was Boxford, Berkshire or Boxford, Suffolk.) and Quainton; and was Principal of Brasenose from 1565 to 1574.

== Footnotes ==
Academic offices
Preceded by John Hawarden	Principal of Brasenose College, Oxford; 1565–1574	Succeeded by Richard Harris
