= Gilbert Smith (disambiguation) =

G. O. Smith (1872–1943) is a British amateur footballer.

Gilbert Smith may also refer to:

- Gilbert Morgan Smith (1885–1959), American botanist
- Gilbert Smith (footballer, born 1869) (1869–?), British professional footballer
- Gilbert E. Smith (1904–?), American college football player and coach
- Gilbert C. Smith, state legislator from Mississippi
- Gilbert F. Smith, state legislator from Idaho
- Gilbert Smith (long jumper), winner of the 1982 long jump at the NCAA Division I Indoor Track and Field Championships
