= Richard Frewin =

English physician and professor of history

Richard Frewin, M.D. (c.1681–1761) was an English physician and professor of history.

== Early life and education ==
Frewin, the son of Ralph Frewin of London, was admitted as a King's Scholar at Westminster in 1693, and elected thence to a Westminster studentship at Christ Church, Oxford, in 1698. He took the degrees of B.A. in 1702, M.A. in 1704, M.B. in 1707, and M.D. in 1711.

== Career ==
In 1708, he was described at the foot of a Latin poem which he contributed to 'Exequiæ Georgio principi Danise ab Oxoniensi academia solutæ' (Oxford, 1708) as professor of chemistry; he was also, in 1711, rhetoric reader at Christ Church. As a physician he had an excellent reputation; he attended Dean Aldrich on his deathbed.

John Freind's 'Hippocrates de Morbis Popularibus' is dedicated to him, and contains a letter from him (dated Christ Church, 20 July 1710), giving an account of a case of variolæ cohærentes which he had been attending. In 1727 he was unanimously elected to the Camden professorship of ancient history, no other candidate offering himself. Hearne relates that soon after his election he bought a hundred pounds' worth of books on history and chronology, 'on purpose to qualify him the better to discharge' the duties of the office. He died on 29 May 1761, having survived his children, who died young, and three wives, Lady Tyrell (widow of Thomas Tyrrell), Elizabeth Woodward, and Mrs. Graves, daughter of Peter Cranke.

Frewin bequeathed £2,000 in trust for the king's scholars of Westminster elected to Christ Church, and another £2,000 in trust for the physicians of the Radcliffe Infirmary, and left his house in Oxford, now known as Frewin Hall, to the Regius Professor of Medicine for the time being. His library of history and literature, consisting of 2,300 volumes, he left to the Radcliffe Library. There is in that library a volume containing a collection of dried specimens of plants made by him, with his notes in manuscript on their medicinal uses. Portraits are in the hall and common room at Christ Church, and a bust, presented by Dr. Hawley in 1757, in the library there.

== Sources ==
This article incorporates text from a publication now in the public domain: Stephen, Leslie, ed. (1889). "Frewin, Richard". Dictionary of National Biography. Vol. 20. London: Smith, Elder & Co.
