= John Bowers (barrister) =

British barrister and part-time judge

John Simon Bowers KC
- Born: 2 January 1956 (age 70)
- Education: Lincoln College, Oxford
- Occupations: Principal of Brasenose College, Oxford; Barrister
- Spouse: Suzanne Franks
- Children: 3

John Bowers KC (born 2 January 1956) is a British barrister and part-time judge who was Principal of Brasenose College, Oxford from 2015 until 2026.

Born in Grimsby, the son of Alfred Bowers and Irene (née Bolton), he was educated at Clee Grammar School in Cleethorpes, and then went up to Lincoln College, Oxford, where he read jurisprudence. He was called to the Bar in 1979, took silk (became a Queen's Counsel) in 1998, became a recorder in 2003, and has been a deputy High Court Judge since 2010. He is an honorary professor at the University of Hull.

== Personal life ==
Bowers is a supporter of Grimsby Town F.C. He is married to Suzanne Franks and has three children.

In February 2026, Recorder John Bowers KC reported to the Judicial Conduct Investigations Office (JCIO) that he had been disqualified from driving for six months after accumulating 12 penalty points from four separate driving offences. Bowers expressed his regret over the offences and said that he was “profoundly sorry” for being disqualified, acknowledging that, as a judge, he should have exercised greater care. In July 2026, the Lady Chief Justice, with the agreement of the Lord Chancellor, issued Bowers with a formal warning for misconduct.

The BBC reported that Bowers was due to step down as Principal of Brasenose College in October 2026, having led the college since 2015.

== Publications ==
Bowers has written, alone or with others, 14 books on law including

- Bowers, John (2017). A Practical Approach to Employment Law (9 ed.). Oxford University Press. ISBN 978-0198766544.
- Honeyball, Simon; Bowers, John (2012). Honeyball & Bowers' Textbook on Employment Law (12 ed.). Oxford University Press. ISBN 978-0199639854.
- Lewis, Jeremy; Bowers, John; Fodder, Martin; Mitchell, Jack (2017). Whistleblowing: Law and Practice (3 ed.). Oxford University Press. ISBN 978-0198788034.
- Bowers, John; Duggan, Michael; Reade, David (2011). The Law of Industrial Action and Trade Union Recognition. Oxford University Press. ISBN 978-0199589623.

Writing in The Law Society Gazette Graham Clayton described The Law of Industrial Action and Trade Union Recognition as "a work of authority and clarity". Writing in the Industrial Law Journal David Lewis described the first edition of Whistleblowing as "a comprehensive and insightful analysis".

He has also written Downward Spiral: Collapsing Public Standards and How to Restore Them, which was published in 2024.

Academic offices
Preceded by Alan Bowman	Principal of Brasenose College, Oxford; 2015-2026	Succeeded by Alyson King
