= John Hawarden =

John Hawarden was the second Principal of Brasenose College, Oxford.

Hawarden was born in Lancashire. He held the living at Steeple Aston; and was Principal of Brasenose from 1548 to 1565.

== Notes ==
Academic offices
Preceded by Matthew Smyth	Principal of Brasenose College, Oxford; 1548–1565	Succeeded by Thomas Blanchard
