= Francis Yarborough =

English academic administrator

Francis Yarborough, (died 24 April 1770) D.D. was an Oxford college head.

Yarborough was born at Campsall and educated at Brasenose College, Oxford. He held livings at Over Worton and Aynho; and was Principal of Brasenose from 1745 until his death on 24 April 1770.

== Notes ==
Academic offices
Preceded by Robert Shippen	Principal of Brasenose College, Oxford; 1745–1770	Succeeded by William Gwyn
