= William Gwyn =

William Gwyn (11 April 1736 in Prescot – 19 August 1770 in Brighton) was an Oxford college head.

Gwyn was educated at Brasenose College, Oxford. He held the livings at Cottingham, Northamptonshire; and was Principal of Brasenose from his election on 10 May 1770 until his death four months later.

== Notes ==
Academic offices
Preceded by Francis Yarborough	Principal of Brasenose College, Oxford; 1745–1770	Succeeded by Ralph Cawley
