= Ralph Cawley =

Ralph Cawley (1720 – 31 August 1777) was an English clergyman and Oxford academic.

Cawley was born at Farnworth (then in Lancashire, now in Cheshire) in 1720, the son of John Cawley, schoolmaster at Farnworth School and later headmaster of Wigan Grammar School.

He was educated at Brasenose College, Oxford, matriculating in 1738, graduating B.A. 1742, M.A. 1744, B.D. & D.D. 1766. He was a Fellow of Brasenose 1744–1760.

He was ordained deacon on 20 May 1744 and priest on 8 June 1745, both ordinations performed by Thomas Secker, Bishop of Oxford in Christ Church Cathedral, Oxford.

He was appointed Rector of Selham, Sussex, in 1755 (a college nomination), and Rector of St Dunstan's, Stepney in East London in 1759. He built a new parsonage at Stepney in 1763–1764, mostly at his own expense. He resigned at Stepney in 1770, on his election as Principal of Brasenose.

He was elected Principal of Brasenose in September 1770, holding the office until his death on 31 August 1777.

Towards the end of his life, Cawley suffered from a heart condition, for which he took foxglove root, which greatly reduced the symptoms, relieving his breath and reducing the swelling in his legs. This story came to the attention of the botanist William Withering, who investigated and documented the medicinal use of foxglove. (The narrative that Cawley was treated by "Mother Hutton" who then sold her recipe to Withering is fanciful, created in a marketing campaign for the Parke-Davis pharmaceutical company in the 1920s.)

== Family ==
On 21 April 1768, Cawley married Ann Cooper (1736–1787), daughter of Gislingham Cooper, a London goldsmith and banker resident in Henley-on-Thames. They had no children.

Mrs Cawley's brother Edward Cooper was married to an aunt of Jane Austen. In 1783, Jane Austen, aged seven, was sent with her sister Cassandra and cousin Jane Cooper to board with the widowed Mrs Cawley, in Oxford then Southampton. The arrangement ended when Jane and Cassandra contracted a serious fever: Mrs Cawley did not notify the family, but Jane Cooper did, and Mrs Austen and Mrs Cooper travelled to Southampton to bring the girls home: Mrs Cooper caught the infection and died in October 1783.

Mrs Cawley died at her brother’s house in the Strand on 8 November 1787.

== Notes ==
Academic offices
Preceded by William Gwyn	Principal of Brasenose College, Oxford; 1770–1777	Succeeded by Thomas Barker
