= Maurice Platnauer =

British classicist (1887–1974)

- Born: 1887 June 18; Yorkshire
- Died: 1974 December 19
- Parents: Henry Maurice Platnauer (father); Mary Ann Platnauer (mother)

Maurice Platnauer (18 June 1887 – 19 December 1974) was Principal of Brasenose College, Oxford, from 1956 to 1960.

Platnauer was educated at Shrewsbury School and New College, Oxford. A classicist, he was a master at Winchester College from 1910 to 1915; and from 1919 to 1922; together with his friend Murray Hicks (also a master at the College), he bought Hockley Golf Course from the estate of Horace Trimmer to prevent it from being developed, and in 1955 they gave the land to the College, who remain landlords for the course. During World War One he was an officer with the Royal Garrison Artillery. in 1922 he became a Fellow of Brasenose College, Oxford. He was Vice-Principal of Brasenose from 1936 to 1956; Principal of Brasenose from 1956 to 1960; and Editor of the Classical Quarterly from 1936 to 1947; and an Honorary Fellow of New College from 1957.

== Notes ==
Academic offices
Preceded by Hugh Last	Principals of Brasenose College, Oxford; 1956–1960	Succeeded by Noel Frederick Hall
