= Thomas Barker (academic) =

Thomas Barker (c. 1728 – 18 August 1785) was an English clergyman and Oxford academic.

Barker was born in Lancashire and matriculated at Brasenose College, Oxford in 1745, at age 17. He graduated B.A. in 1749, M.A. in 1751, B.D. & D.D. in 1778.

Becoming a Fellow of Brasenose in 1750, Barker was a member of the Red Herring dining club, which had Jacobite associations and ceased meeting in 1761, at the end of its existence.

Barker was elected Principal of Brasenose on 14 September 1777. He died in Manchester on 18 August 1785, and was buried there. He was succeeded after his death by William Cleaver.

During Barker's time, Brasenose was the butt of satirical humour in Hannah Cowley's 1779 play Who's the Dupe?, for pedantry, provincial manners and unfashionable dress, in the character Gradus.

== Notes ==
Academic offices
Preceded by Ralph Cawley	Principal of Brasenose College, Oxford; 1777–1785	Succeeded by William Cleaver
