= Edward Hartopp Cradock =

English academic

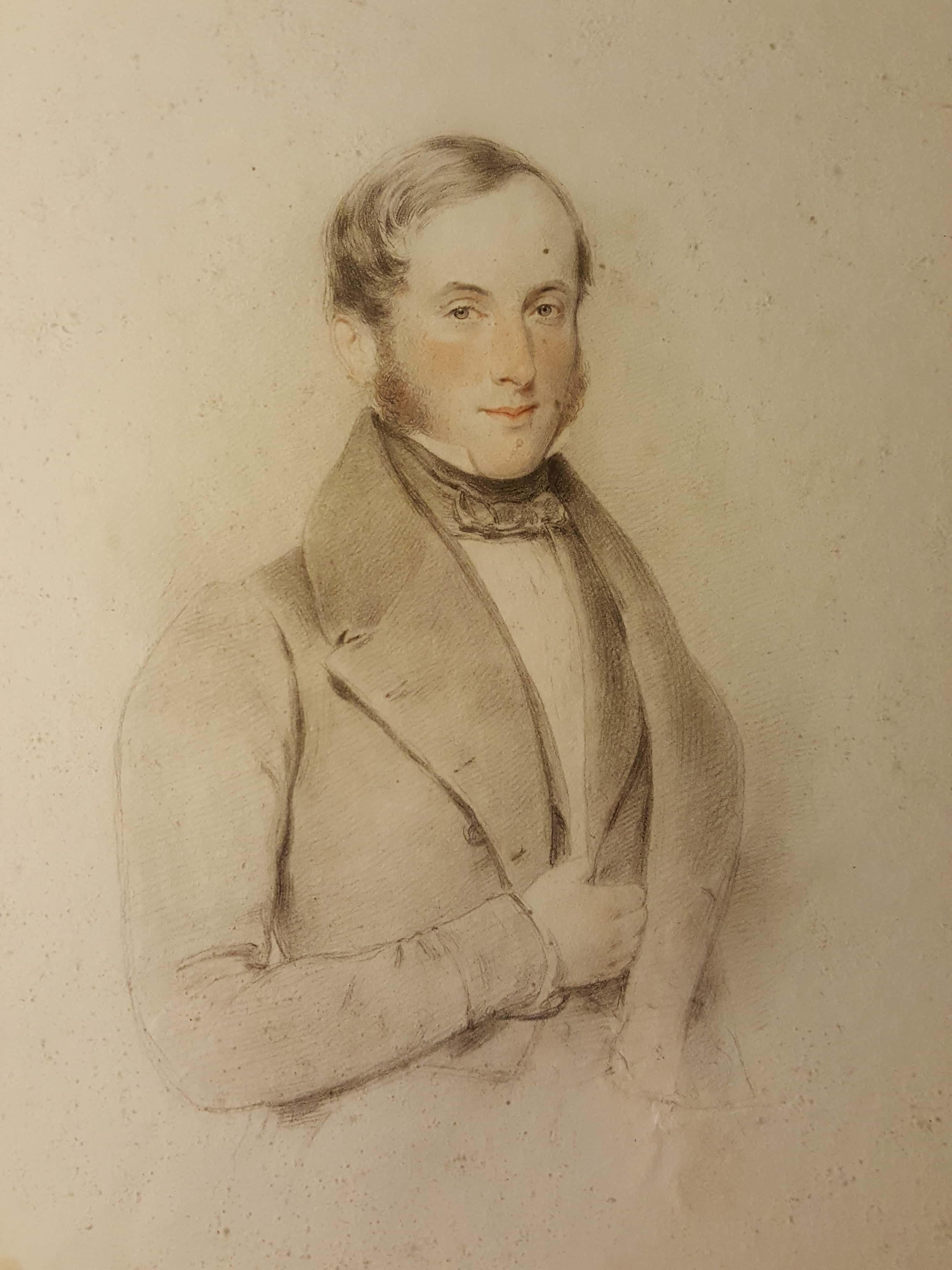
Edward Hartopp Cradock, 1870 drawing

The Rev. Edward Hartopp Cradock, D.D. (29 November 1810 – 27 January 1886) was an Oxford college head in the 19th century.

Cradock was born in Shenstone, Staffordshire and educated at Balliol College, Oxford, matriculating 1827, and graduating B.A. in 1831. At Brasenose College he graduated M.A. in 1834 as Edward Grove, his birth name, and B.D. & D.D. in 1854. He held the living at Tedstone Delamere; and was Principal of Brasenose from 1853 until his death. He was married to novelist Harriet Cradock.

== Notes ==
Academic offices
Preceded by Richard Harington	Principal of Brasenose College, Oxford; 1853–1886	Succeeded by Albert Watson
