= Albert Watson (academic) =

English academic

The Rev. Albert Watson (December 1828 – 21 November 1904) was an Oxford college head in the 19th century.

Watson was born in Astley, Worcestershire and educated at Brasenose College, Oxford. A classicist, he was Fellow of Brasenose from 1852 to 1886. He was a Tutor from 1854 to 1867; a Lecturer from 1867 to 1870; and Bursar from 1871 until his election as Principal of Brasenose in 1886. He resigned in 1889; and died in 1904.

== Notes ==
Academic offices
Preceded by Edward Hartopp Cradock	Principal of Brasenose College, Oxford; 1886–1889	Succeeded by Charles Buller Heberden
