= Gilbert C. Smith =

American politician

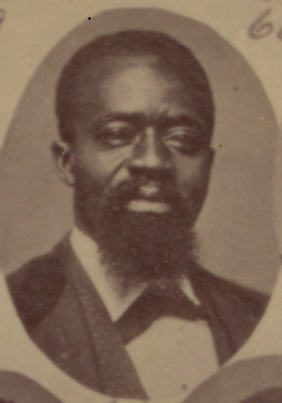

Member of the Mississippi House of Representatives
- In office 1884–1885
- In office 1872–1875

Personal details
- Born: c. 1843 South Carolina, U.S.
- Party: Republican
- Spouse: Luvenia
- Profession: Politician, farmer

Military service
- Allegiance: United States
- Rank: Lieutenant colonel

Gilbert C. Smith was a state legislator in Mississippi.

Smith was born in South Carolina. He represented Tunica County in the Mississippi House of Representatives from 1872 to 1875 and 1884 to 1885.

In 1896 the Meridian newspaper in a write up about the Reconstruction era stated he argued for state legislators to be made lawyers and attributed a quote to him.

== See also ==
- African American officeholders from the end of the Civil War until before 1900
