= St Mary's College, Oxford =

Former college of the University of Oxford

St Mary's College
- University of Oxford
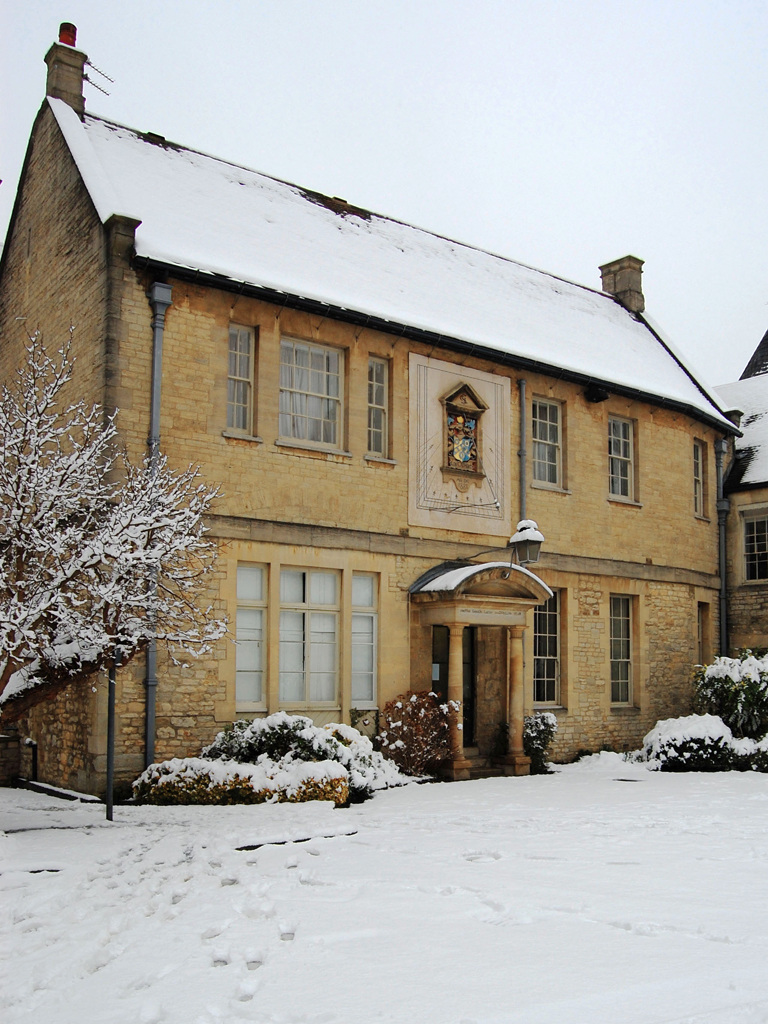
- Location: New Inn Hall Street
- Coordinates: 51.7528°N 1.2596°W
- Established: 1435
- Closed: 1541
- Named for: Saint Mary

Map
- Location within Oxford city centre

St Mary's College was a former college in Oxford, England. It is not to be confused with the two other colleges also named "St. Mary's", more commonly known as Oriel College and New College.

In the 15th century, the canons of Oseney Abbey attended lectures at Oxford University. Sometimes other Augustinian canons were allowed to stay at Oseney for the same purpose. However, this was by favour rather than by right. Therefore, in 1421, at a meeting of the Augustinian order in Leicester, a petition was sent to King Henry V to found a college for the order in Oxford.

A site was found at the eastern end of what is now the modern frontage of Balliol College. However, this scheme was abandoned because the King died in 1422. Later, in 1435, Thomas Holden and his wife Elizabeth founded St Mary's College, donating land in the parishes of St Michael's North, and St Peter le Bailey, and also building a chapel.

Rules were created by the Abbot of Oseney in 1448. Secular clerks could also be admitted, but had to pay for their accommodation. The college was headed by the prior studentium.

The construction of the college was slow and Thomas Wolsey attempted to accelerate construction. Following the dissolution of the monasteries, the college fell into disrepair.

The college was located on the east side of New Inn Hall Street and a gateway still remains. The rebuilt buildings are known as Frewin Hall, named after Richard Frewin (or Frewen), a scholar at Christ Church, Oxford (matriculated in 1698) and later Camden Professor of Ancient History.

On 2 June 1582, Brasenose College leased the house to Griffith Lloyd. For many years the house was the official residence of the Regius Professor of Medicine at Oxford University.

In 1860, Edward, Prince of Wales, later King Edward VII, was briefly in residence at Frewin Hall with his tutors.

The surviving buildings of the medieval college and the Norman town house that preceded it have been studied by Professor John Blair, who has reconstructed the plan of the site. The Tudor hammer-beam roof of the lost chapel was re-used in the 17th-century chapel of Brasenose College, where it now remains above a plaster ceiling. Ruins of the college were uncovered during excavations on the site in 2022.

== See also ==
- St Mary Hall, Oxford
- Oriel College
- New College
- Brasenose College
