= Richard Harris (college principal) =

Richard Harris (fl. 1558 – 1595) was an academic at the University of Oxford and clergyman in the sixteenth century.

== Life ==
Harris, from Herefordshire, obtained his B.A. degree from Oxford University on 3 November 1558 and his M.A. degree on 26 June 1562. He was appointed rector of Kentchurch, Herefordshire in 1571 and became a canon of Hereford Cathedral in 1575. He was principal of Brasenose College, Oxford, from 1573/4 to 1595. During this time, he was appointed by the royal charter of 1589 as one of the Commissioners to draw up statutes for Jesus College, Oxford.

Academic offices
| Preceded by Thomas Blanchard | Principal of Brasenose College, Oxford; 1573/4–1595 | Succeeded by Alexander Nowell |
