= Parliamentary visitation of the University of Oxford =

1647 religious and political purge of Oxford

The parliamentary visitation of the University of Oxford was a political and religious purge taking place from 1647, for a number of years. Many Masters and Fellows of Colleges lost their positions.

== Background ==
A comparable but less prominent parliamentary visitation of the University of Cambridge had taken place in 1644–5. The Siege of Oxford from 1644 to 1646 was one of the major military actions of the First English Civil War, given that the Royalist forces had their headquarters in Oxford city. The University of Oxford, broadly speaking, supported the Royalist side in the war, in particular in financial terms. The city surrendered to the parliamentary forces on 24 June 1646, and by 2 July parliament blocked new appointments in the university. By October a visitation was proposed, and an Oxford delegation made representations against it.

== First moves ==
The initial step was the appointment of seven preachers of Presbyterian views, to bring in the use of the Directory for Public Worship. The visitation began on 15 May 1647. An early move was to summon Samuel Fell, the vice-chancellor. He ignored the visitors, was imprisoned for a time, and by November was deprived of his offices.

The outbreak of the Second English Civil War in early 1648 prompted a much more effective approach from the visitors, who at first were quite successfully obstructed, and it was from April that the purge really began. All the members of the university Convocation were required to submit to the visitation, on 7 April 1648. Only one of the Heads of Houses, Paul Hood, did so at that point.

== Formal structure ==
Formally, the visitation (which was the first out of three by 1660) was a commission of both houses of Parliament. It was controlled by a large parliamentary committee (the "London Committee"). To begin with, this consisted of 48 members of the House of Commons, tasked with the "reform" of the university. By the ordinance implemented 1 May 1647, it was replaced by 26 peers and 52 MPs. This group (and any five from them) were to oversee 26 Visitors. Of those, ten were Puritan clergy, who included the seven preachers sent to Oxford (in September). Those preachers comprised Francis Cheynell (who ran a "scruple shop"), Edward Corbet, Henry Cornish (then of St Giles in the Fields, after the visitation a canon of Christ Church), Robert Harris, Henry Langley, Edward Reynolds, and Henry Wilkinson.

In 1650 the London Committee was still transacting much of the business of the visitation. Francis Rous, initially appointed to the appeals committee, had by then assumed a leadership role. Staff on the ground in Oxford included Ralph Austen, who became registrar, and Elisha Coles who acted for him, both Calvinist writers. The Register was published in 1881, edited by Montagu Burrows.

== Heads of Houses ==
The visitation had the power to order "intrusions": the Oxford colleges were self-governing institutions under a Master (i.e. "head of house", going under various other titles) and fellows, but the normal procedures for election were bypassed, if necessary, to impose appointments.

Christopher Hill distinguishes between the reactions of colleges and halls. Members of halls acknowledged the visitation; while the majority of college fellows were expelled for failing to do so.

=== Colleges ===
College (title)	Head before visitation	Head after visitation	Comments
All Souls (Warden)	Gilbert Sheldon	John Palmer	The Warden and 13 fellows were expelled after refusing to submit. In total 44 fellows were then intruded.
Balliol (Master)	Thomas Lawrence	George Bradshaw	
Brasenose (Principal)	Samuel Radcliffe	Daniel Greenwood	A defiant fellowship elected Thomas Yate to succeed Radcliffe; all but three were expelled.
Christ Church (Dean)	Samuel Fell	Edward Reynolds	The Dean and seven of his canons were ejected; the eighth died at the same period.
Corpus Christi (President)	Robert Newlin	Edmund Staunton	
Exeter (Rector)	George Hakewill	John Conant from 1649	Hakewill was an absentee Rector, and chronically ill; he died in 1649, having been left in position through the intervention of MPs. Henry Tozer was running the college, and was a defiant opponent of the visitation. He was expelled as fellow in May 1648; and later was removed by soldiers from his pulpit at Carfax, and placed in the Bocardo for a time.
Jesus (Principal)	Francis Mansell	Michael Roberts	All but one of the fellows was expelled.
Lincoln (Rector)	Paul Hood	Paul Hood	While Hood as Rector gave the only prompt submission to the visitors, the sub-rector John Webberley resisted, was briefly imprisoned, and was expelled. The remaining fellows were gone by 1650, and were replaced by nominees.
Magdalen (President)	John Oliver	John Wilkinson	Wilkinson was one of the Visitors. Around 28 of the fellows were expelled.
Merton (Warden)	Nathaniel Brent	Nathaniel Brent	Brent, a parliamentarian, had been dismissed by Charles I in January 1644 after Archbishop Laud's execution. Laud had been the Visitor (or patron) of Merton. His successor, the physician William Harvey, was displaced on Brent's return in June 1646 after the siege. Brent was president of the visitation from May 1647 to October 1651.
New College (Warden)	Henry Stringer	George Marshall	As well as an intruded Warden, there were expulsions on a large scale, and replacements brought in from Cambridge.
Oriel (Provost)	John Saunders	John Saunders	Seven fellows were expelled, and replacements brought in from Cambridge.
Pembroke (Master)	Henry Wightwicke	Henry Langley	
Queen's (Provost)	Gerard Langbaine	Gerard Langbaine	Langbaine was active against the visitation, by legalistic means, with the support of Richard Zouche. He also cultivated supporters in parliament, John Selden and Francis Mills, and enlisted the help of John Owen. Accepting Philip Herbert, 4th Earl of Pembroke as Chancellor, and not making religious difficulties, he survived as Provost.
St John's (President)	Richard Baylie	Francis Cheynell	Some fellows were expelled with Baylie. Cheynell was one of the Visitors.
Trinity (President)	Hannibal Potter	Robert Harris	
University (Master)	Thomas Walker	Joshua Hoyle	Obadiah Walker and four other fellows ejected.
Wadham (Warden)	John Pitt	John Wilkins	

=== Halls ===
Hall (title)	Head before visitation	Head after visitation	Comments
Gloucester Hall (Principal)	John Maplett	Tobias Garbrand	
Hart Hall			
Magdalen Hall			
New Inn Hall			
St Alban Hall			
St Edmund Hall (Principal)	Adam Airay	Adam Airay	
St Mary Hall (Principal)			

== Professors ==
Chair	Professor before visitation	Professor after visitation	Comments
Camden (history)	Robert Waring	Lewis du Moulin	Du Moulin petitioned parliament in 1646 for a chair or position as college head. He was inaugurated in August 1648.
Lady Margaret (divinity)	Thomas Laurence	Francis Cheynell	
Laudian (Arabic) Regius (Hebrew)	Edward Pococke	Edward Pococke	
Regius (civil law)	Richard Zouche	Richard Zouche	
Regius (divinity)	Robert Sanderson	Joshua Hoyle	Robert Crosse, appointed by the visitors, was unwilling to serve.
Regius (Greek)	Henry Stringer	John Harmar	Harmar was intruded in 1650.
Regius (medicine)	Thomas Clayton the Elder	Thomas Clayton the Younger	The younger Clayton submitted to the visitors, and was allowed to take over his father's chair.
Savilian (astronomy)	John Greaves	Seth Ward	Greaves was ejected, then assisted Ward to get the chair, as did Sir John Trevor.
Savilian (geometry)	Peter Turner	John Wallis	
Sedleian (natural philosophy)	John Edwards	Joshua Crosse	Referred to as a readership at the time. Edwards was an associate of William Laud and Royalist military activist.
White (moral philosophy)	John Birkenhead	Edward Copley	

== Dissolution of the initial visitation ==
The visitation, called later the "first", was brought to a close on 21 April 1652. It was replaced by a commission of five: John Wilkins, who had married Robina Cromwell, sister of Oliver Cromwell, Jonathan Goddard (Magdalen), and Thomas Goodwin (Merton) from among the heads of houses, with Peter French of Christ Church and John Owen who had become vice-chancellor.
