= William Fulman =

English antiquary

William Fulman (1632–1688) was an English antiquary. He remained relatively unknown in his time, not being inclined to push himself forward, and suffering, according to David C. Douglas, from a "persistent lack of bare recognition".

== Life ==
The son of a carpenter, he was born at Penshurst, Kent, in November 1632. Henry Hammond, then rector of Penshurst, found him a place in the choir of Magdalen College, Oxford choir, in order that he might be taught by William White, master of the school. In 1647 he was elected to a scholarship at Corpus Christi College, Oxford and placed with Zachary Bogan as his tutor.

On 22 July 1648 he was ejected by the parliamentary visitors. Along with another scholar of Corpus, one Timothy Parker, Fulman had deliberately 'blotted' and 'torn out' the name of Edmund Stanton, the parliament's choice of college President, which the visitors, on 11 July, had entered in the buttery book in place of Robert Newlin, who had been expelled as president. Hammond, who was himself expelled from his positions, then employed him as his amanuensis. When twenty-one years old he became, by Hammond's introduction, tutor to the heir of the Peto family of Chesterton, Warwickshire, in which capacity he continued until the Restoration. Then, resuming his scholarship at Corpus, he was created M.A. 23 August 1660, and made Fellow.

For several years he stayed in college, as a serious scholar. In 1669 he accepted the college rectory of Meysey Hampton, Gloucestershire. There he was cut off by fever 28 June 1688, and was buried in the churchyard, near his wife Hester, daughter of Thomas Manwaring, son of Roger Manwaring, bishop of St. David's.

== Works ==
He has been supposed, implausibly, to be the author of The Whole Duty of Man, and the Gentleman's Calling.

Fulman was the author of:

- Academiae Oxoniensis Notitia [anon.], (1665, reissued 1675, with additions and corrections from Anthony à Wood's Historia et Antiquitates Universitatis Oxoniensis, published the year before, Fulman, according to Thomas Hearne, furnished the preface to Wood's Historia; he also gave Wood his notes and corrections for the same work,
- Appendix to the Life of Edmund Stanton, D.D., wherein some Passages are further cleared which were not fully held forth by the former Authors (1673), a satirical attack on a biography by the nonconformist Richard Mayow.

He collected for publication the so-called Works of Charles I, to which he intended prefixing a life of the king, but, being taken ill with smallpox, the bookseller, Richard Royston, engaged Richard Perrinchief for the task. It was printed in folio in 1662, when Perrinchief, though he used Fulman's work, assumed the credit . He had studied the history of the Protestant Reformation in England, and at the suggestion of John Fell sent to Gilbert Burnet some corrections and additions for the first part of the latter's History. He also read vol. ii. of the History before it went to press. Burnet printed an abstract of his notes in the Appendix, 1681.

Fulman edited Rerum Anglicarum Scriptorum Veterum tom. i., fol. Oxford, 1684, with Thomas Gale, who was responsible for two other volumes of British historians issued in 1687 and 1691. The same year saw completed his edition of The Works of Henry Hammond, 4 vols. fol. London, 1684, the life having been written by Fell. He also collected materials for the life of John Hales of Eton and for that of Richard Foxe, bishop of Winchester, with an account of the distinguished members of Corpus Christi College. He left twenty quarto and two octavo volumes to his college. Wood was refused access to them, but his editor, Philip Bliss, used them constantly in his edition of Wood's Athenae; they are described in H. O. Coxe's Catalogue of Oxford MSS., pt. ii.
