= Thomas Clayton (disambiguation) =

Thomas Clayton (1777–1854) was an American lawyer and politician.

Thomas Clayton may also refer to:

- Thomas Clayton the Elder (1575–1647), physician and Regious Profess of Anatomy, Oxford
- Thomas Clayton (physician) (c. 1612–1693), MP for Oxford University
- Thomas Clayton (composer) (1673–1725), English musician and opera composer
- Thomas Clayton (American football) (born 1984), American football running back
- Tom Clayton (jockey) (1882–1909), Australian jockey
- Tom Clayton (footballer) (born 2000), English footballer
- Thomas J. Clayton (1826–1900), President Judge of the Thirty-Second Judicial District of Pennsylvania
