= Thomas Hoy =

Thomas Hoy may refer to:

- Thomas Hoy (poet) (1659–1718), English physician and poet
- Thomas Hoy (botanist) (died 1822), English gardener and botanist
- Tom Hoy, musician with Natural Acoustic Band
