= John Meare =

English clergyman and academic administrator

John Meare (c. 1649 – 10 May 1710) was an English clergyman and academic administrator at the University of Oxford.

Meare was the son of John Meare of Horton, Cheshire. He matriculated at Brasenose College, Oxford in 1665, aged 16, graduating B.A. 1669, M.A. 1671, B.D. & D.D. 1684.

He was ordained deacon on 22 September 1678 and priest on 15 June 1679, both ordinations performed by John Fell, Bishop of Oxford in Christ Church Cathedral, Oxford.

In the church, Meare was appointed rector of Great Rollright, Oxfordshire in 1687; rector of Middleton Cheney, Northamptonshire in 1693; and canon of Wells Cathedral in 1703.

Meare was elected principal (head) of Brasenose College, Oxford on 7 May 1681. He also served as Vice-Chancellor of Oxford University 1697–1698. He was so unpopular as vice-chancellor that the warden of All Souls prayed aloud that he might be transported to the colonies.

By January 1709, Meare had lost his mental faculties. As the college statutes required his assent for decisions, his incapacity caused the college administration to grind to a halt, prompting a dispute between the fellows and William Wake (the college Visitor as Bishop of Lincoln) on how to proceed. Meare died on 10 May 1710.

Academic offices
Preceded by Thomas Yate	Principal of Brasenose College, Oxford; 1681–1710	Succeeded by Robert Shippen
Preceded by Fitzherbert Adams	Vice-Chancellor of Oxford University; 1697–1698	Succeeded by William Paynter
