= Paul Hood =

Paul Hood may refer to:

- Paul Hood (academic administrator)
- Paul Hood (coach)
