= Edmund Stanton =

Edmund Stanton may refer to:

- Edmund Stanton, another spelling for Edmund Staunton (1600–1671), English clergyman, President of Corpus Christi College, Oxford, and a member of the Westminster Assembly
- Edmund C. Stanton (1854–1901), general director of the Metropolitan Opera
