= Vincent Canes =

Vincent Canes (1608–1672) or (John Baptist Canes and John Vincent Cane) was an English Franciscan controversialist, born on the borders of Nottinghamshire and Leicestershire, date uncertain; died in London, June, 1672.

== Life ==
Brought up a Reformed Protestant, he embraced the Catholic faith at the age of twenty, and shortly afterwards went from England to the English College, Douai. Here he was received into the Franciscan Order and became lector of philosophy and later professor of theology in the convent of the Friars Minor.

Having returned to England, he worked for the spread of the Catholic faith and was chosen by the Catholics to defend their cause against Edward Stillingfleet.

== Works ==
Canes's ability as a controversialist was strengthened by the absence of bitterness or animosity towards his opponents, while his elegant style made his writings effective.

His works are:

- The Reclaimed Papist: or a Dialogue between a Popish Knight, a Protestant Lady, a Parson and his Wife (1655);
- Fiat Lux: or a General conduct to a right understanding and charity in the great Combustions and Broils about Religion here in England, betwixt Papist and Protestant, Presbyterian and Independent. To the end that Moderation and Quietness may at length happily ensue after so serious Tumults in the Kingdom (1662). This work was dedicated to Elizabeth, Countess of Arundel and Surrey, the mother of Cardinal Howard.
- Infallibility (1665), an appendix to the preceding work;
- An Epistle to the Author of Animadversion on Fiat Lux (1664);
- Diaphanta, or Three Attendants on Fiat Lux, wherein Catholik Religion is further excused against the opposition of several Adversaries (1665), a work addressing replies to William Denton, Peter du Moulin, John Owen, Edward Stillingfleet, Jeremy Taylor, and Daniel Whitby.
- Three Letters declaring the strange, odd Proceedings of Protestant Divines when they write against Catholics, etc. (1671);
- Tῷ Kαθολικῷ Stillingfleeto; being an account given to a Catholik friend of Dr. Stillingfleet's late book against the Church of Rome(1672).
