= Samuel Ratcliffe =

Samuel Ratcliffe may refer to:

- Samuel D. Ratcliffe (1945–1995), screenwriter for daytime television
- Samuel Kerkham Ratcliffe (1868–1958), English journalist and lecturer

== See also ==
- Samuel Radcliffe (c. 1580–1648), Oxford academic and clergyman
