= Henry Tozer =

Henry Tozer may refer to:

- Henry Tozer (priest) (1602–1650), English priest and academic
- Henry Fanshawe Tozer (1829–1916), English writer, teacher, and traveler
