= Daniel Greenwood =

English clergyman and academic administrator

Daniel Greenwood (c. 1605 – 29 January 1674) was an English clergyman and academic administrator at the University of Oxford.

Greenwood was the son of Richard Greenwood of Sowerby, North Yorkshire. He matriculated at Lincoln College, Oxford in 1624, aged 19, and graduated B.A. in 1627 (incorporated B.A. at Cambridge in 1632). He was appointed a Clifton Fellow of Brasenose College, Oxford in 1627, graduating M.A. 1629, B.D. 1641, D.D. 1649.

In 1637, Archbishop Laud instructed the Vice-Chancellor (Laud's nephew-in-law Richard Baylie) to keep an eye on Greenwood, whose Puritan preaching had come to Laud's attention:

And that Greenwood, who preached on Sunday last, is like to prove a peevish man, which I am the more sorry for, because you write he is a good master of his pen, and therefore like to do the more harm. But since he hath so cunningly carried it, (for the fashion is now to turn the libellous part into a prayer,) I think the best way is to take no notice of it at all; but the more carefully to observe what the man doth in the university ... And yet to confess my thoughts to you, I think Mr. Greenwood had in this business a very factious and a rancorous meaning.

— Archbishop Laud, from a letter to the Vice-Chancellor, 1 September 1637

In the church, Greenwood was Rector of Chastleton, Oxfordshire 1640–1662.

During the Parliamentary occupation of Oxford (Parliament had captured Oxford at the Siege of Oxford in 1646), Samuel Radcliffe, Principal of Brasenose College, refused to recognise the authority of the Parliamentary visitors, who issued an order expelling Radcliffe as Principal in January 1648, and appointed Greenwood as Principal on 29 February. On 13 April the Chancellor visited Brasenose to invest Greenwood with the office. Radcliffe, by then in terminal ill health, did not leave Brasenose, dying under house arrest on 26 June. In a process disrupted by Parliamentary soldiers, the Fellows then elected Thomas Yate in opposition to Greenwood. Yate and 12 other Fellows (out of 16 Fellows in total) were then expelled from their Fellowships.

Although a Parliamentary appointee, Greenwood was a good college administrator; under Greenwood, numbers at the College rose from 20 to 120. He was also Vice-Chancellor of Oxford University 1650–1652. His Vice-Chancellorship was renewed in 1651 by Oliver Cromwell as University Chancellor, Cromwell commending Greenwood's "ability and zeale for Reformation".

In 1660, both Greenwood and Yate presented their claims to the principalship, Yate stating that Greenwood had not taken the Principal's oath, Greenwood stating that Yate's election was not entered in the college register and did not follow the statutes. Yate prevailed, the college Visitor (the Bishop of Lincoln) ordering that Yate be reinstated as Principal.

Greenwood died at Steeple Aston on 29 January 1673/74, and was buried in the chancel of the church.

Academic offices
Preceded by Samuel Radcliffe	Principal of Brasenose College, Oxford; 1648–1660	Succeeded by Thomas Yate
Preceded by Edward Reynolds	Vice-Chancellor of Oxford University; 1650–1652	Succeeded by John Owen
