= Richard Perrinchief =

English royalist churchman and biographer

- Born: c. 1620
- Died: 31 August 1673; Westminster
- Resting place: Westminster Abbey
- Education: Magdalene College, Cambridge
- Occupations: Clergyman, author

Richard Perrinchief or Perrincheif (c. 1620 – 1673) was an English royalist churchman, a biographer of Charles I, writer against religious tolerance, and archdeacon of Huntingdon.

== Life ==
The son of a carpenter of Aldersgate, London, he was educated at Christ's Hospital, and matriculated as a sizar at King's College, Cambridge in 1638. He moved to Magdalene College, Cambridge, where he graduated B.A. in 1642, and M.A. in 1645. He was ejected from his fellowship by the parliamentary commissioners under the ordinance of 13 February 1646, in 1650.

At the Restoration he became rector of St Mildred, Poultry in London, to which St Mary Colechurch was annexed in 1671. He proceeded D.D. at Cambridge on 2 July 1663; on 3 November 1664 he was installed prebendary of St. Peter's, Westminster, and on 2 August 1667 prebendary of London (Chiswick stall). On 29 March 1670 he was collated to the archdeaconry of Huntingdon. He was also sub-almoner to Charles II.

He died at Westminster on 31 August 1673, and was buried on 2 September in the abbey. His wife had died on 15 June 1671. Under his will the executors, William Clark, dean of Winchester, and Robert Peacock, rector of Long Ditton, Surrey, purchased land, the rents of which were to be given in perpetuity to the vicars of Buckingham.

== Publications ==
His doctoral theses (Potestas ecclesiae in censuris est Jure Divino, and Non datur in terris pastor universalis totius ecclesiae) were printed. Perrinchief wrote, besides sermons:

- The Syracusan Tyrant, or the Life of Agathocles, with some Reflexions on the Practices of our Modern Usurpers, London, 1661 (dedicated to Thomas Wriothesley, 4th Earl of Southampton); republished London, 1676, as The Sicilian Tyrant, or the Life of Agathocles.
- A Discourse of Toleration, in answer to a late book entituled A Discourse of the Religion of England, London, 1667; against John Corbet. Perrinchief opposed toleration or any modification of the Church of England establishment.
- Indulgence not justified: being a continuation of the Discourse of Toleration in answer to the arguments of a late book entituled a Peace Offering or Plea for Indulgence, and to the cavils of another, called the Second Discourse of the Religion in England, London, 1668. Another work against Corbet.

Perrinchief also completed the edition prepared by William Fulman of Bασιλικά: the Workes of King Charles the Martyr, with a collection of declarations and treaties, London, 1662, and compiled a life for it from Fulman's notes and some materials of Silas Titus. This life was republished in 1676 as The Royal Martyr, or the Life and Death of King Charles I, anon.; and was included in the 1727 edition of the Eikon Basilike, as 'written by Richard Perencheif, one of his majesties chaplains.'
