= I do not like thee, Doctor Fell =

Poem

Nursery rhyme
- Written: 1680
- Genre: Traditional rhyme
- Songwriter: Tom Brown

I do not like (or love) thee, Doctor Fell is an epigram, said to have been translated by satirical English poet Tom Brown in 1680. Later it has been recorded as a nursery rhyme and a proverb.

== Origin ==
The anecdote associated with the origin of the rhyme is that when Brown was a student at Christ Church, Oxford, he was caught doing mischief. The college dean, John Fell had expelled Brown but offered to take him back if he passed a test. If Brown could make an extempore translation of the thirty-second epigram of Martial, his expulsion would be cancelled. The epigram in Latin is as follows:

Non amo te, Sabidi, nec possum dicere quare.
Hoc tantum possum dicere: non amo te,

a literal translation of which is "I do not like you, Sabidius, nor can I say why. This much I can say: I do not like you." Brown successfully met the challenge with his impromptu version, which soon became well known:

I do not like thee, Doctor Fell,
The reason why – I cannot tell;
But this I know, and know full well,
I do not like thee, Doctor Fell.

The story is that Dr. Fell stayed Brown's dismissal but the story is apocryphal. All that is known is that Brown left Oxford without a degree.

== Later use ==
The verse was not mentioned as a nursery rhyme until late in the 19th century and did not appear in collections of such material. In 1802 it was quoted in an English parliamentary debate (with reference to Martial's epigram) as "the English parody". The 1809 British Encyclopedia mentions its earlier appearance in a novel by Samuel Richardson. But by 1877 it is referred to as "the old nursery rhyme" in the course of a New Zealand parliamentary debate. In the 1886 novella Strange Case of Dr Jekyll and Mr Hyde, Mr Utterson references "the old story of Dr Fell" in his attempts to rationalise his instinctive hatred of Mr Hyde. And in the US it was described as a "nursery jingle" in the 1914 edition of The Pottery & Glass Salesman. The young Samuel Barber also included it among his "Nursery rhymes or Mother Goose rhymes set to music" (1918–22).

The rhyme later appeared in The Oxford Dictionary of Proverbs (1935), but with no mention of a nursery connection. In 1927, however, Robert Graves included it in his collection of The Less Familiar Nursery Rhymes in a version that later appeared in The Oxford Dictionary of Nursery Rhymes (1951).
