= Thomas Turner (president) =

English churchman and academic

Thomas Turner (September, 1645 – 29 April 1714) was an English churchman and academic, Archdeacon of Essex and President of Corpus Christi College, Oxford.

== Life ==
The second son of Thomas Turner, Dean of Canterbury, he was born at Bristol on 19 or 20 September 1645; he was a younger brother of Francis Turner. Thomas originally matriculated at Hart Hall on 10 May 1662, but on 6 October 1663 he was admitted to a Gloucestershire scholarship at Corpus, of which he became fellow in 1672. He graduated B.A. on 15 March 1666, M.A. in 1669, B.D. in 1677, and D.D. in 1683.

From 1672 to 1695 he was vicar of Milton, near Sittingbourne, Kent, and from 1680 to 1689 rector of Thorley, Hertfordshire. He became rector of Fulham, Middlesex, in 1688, archdeacon of Essex in 1680, canon of Ely in 1686, canon of St Paul's Cathedral in 1682, and precentor in 1690. These preferments, except the sinecure rectory of Fulham and the canonry and precentorship of St. Paul's, he resigned at or shortly after his election to the presidency of Corpus on 13 March 1688. The rapid election, which took place within a week of the death of his predecessor Robert Newlyn, diminished the chance of any interference from the court of James II.

Turner reformed the college and spent his own money on it. In 1706 he began what are now the Fellows' buildings, to a design attributed to Henry Aldrich. They were completed in 1712. Turner died on 29 April 1714, and is buried in the college chapel, where, as also at Stowe Nine Churches in Northamptonshire, there is a lengthy inscription about his bequests. These included a major benefaction to the Corporation of the Sons of the Clergy.

Turner was, from the hints of Thomas Hearne, suspected of Jacobite sympathies, but on very slender grounds. His publication was a sermon preached at Whitehall on 29 May 1685 before James II, to whom he was chaplain. In this sermon there is criticism of Thomas Hobbes's position, that a 'state of nature is a state of war.'

Academic offices
Preceded by Robert Newlyn	President of Corpus Christi College, Oxford; 1688-1714	Succeeded by Basil Kennett
