= Thomas Singleton (academic) =

English academic administrator

Thomas Singleton (1552 – 29 November 1614) was an English clergyman and academic.

Singleton studied at Clare Hall, Cambridge for four years, before moving to Brasenose College, Oxford in 1573. He graduated B.A. 1574, M.A. 1578, B.D. 1586, D.D. 1597. He became a Fellow of Brasenose in 1576, and was Proctor in 1585–86. He was Principal of Brasenose College from 1595 until his death in 1614. He was twice vice-chancellor at the University of Oxford during 1598–9 and 1611–14.

In the church, Singleton was a canon of St Paul's Cathedral from 1597, and of Hereford Cathedral from 1614.

Singleton died on 29 November 1614, and was buried in St Mary's Church.

Academic offices
Preceded by Alexander Nowell	Principal of Brasenose College, Oxford; 1595–1614	Succeeded by Samuel Radcliffe
Preceded by Thomas Ravys	Vice-Chancellor of Oxford University; 1598–1599	Succeeded by Thomas Thornton
Preceded by John King	Vice-Chancellor of Oxford University; 1611–1614	Succeeded by William Goodwyn
