= Samuel Radcliffe =

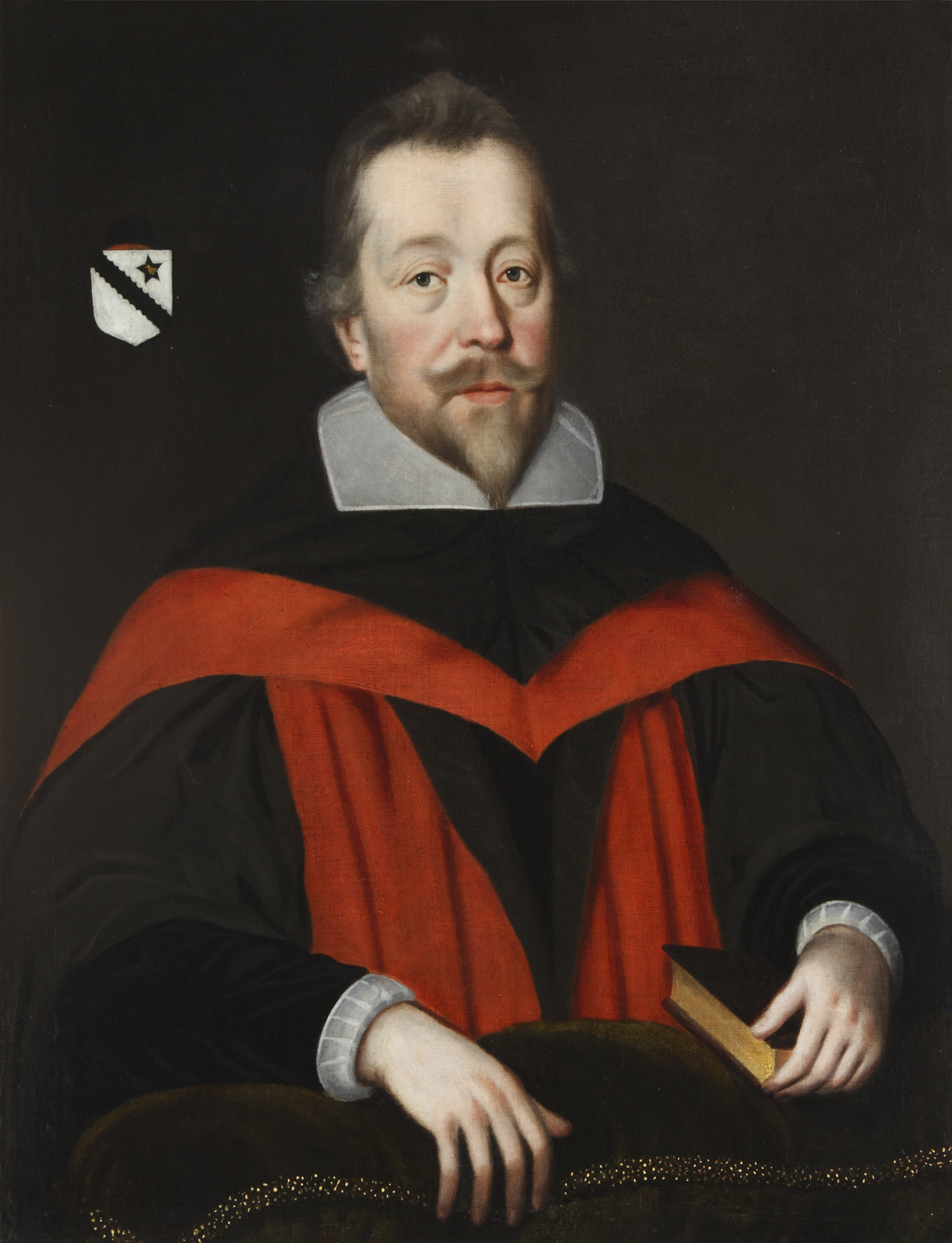
Samuel Radcliffe

Samuel Radcliffe (c. 1580 – 26 June 1648) was an Oxford academic and clergyman.

Radcliffe was born in Lancashire. He was educated at Brasenose College, Oxford, matriculating in 1597 aged 17, graduating B.A. 1601, M.A. 1604, B.D. 1611, D.D. 1615. In the church, he held livings at Steeple Aston (where he founded a school in 1640) and Boxford.

He was university proctor in 1610, and was appointed Principal of Brasenose in 1614.

During the Parliamentary occupation of Oxford (Parliament had captured Oxford at the Siege of Oxford in 1646), Radcliffe refused to recognise the authority of the Parliamentary visitors, who issued an order expelling Radcliffe as Principal in January 1648, and appointed Daniel Greenwood as Principal on 29 February. On 13 April the Chancellor visited Brasenose to invest Greenwood with the office. Radcliffe, by then in terminal ill health, did not leave Brasenose. He wrote his will on 24 April 1648, leaving bequests to Brasenose and to the school which he had founded at Steeple Aston. On 1 June, the Visitors ordered Radcliffe to give up his books and keys to Greenwood, or face house arrest by a guard of soldiers for which he would pay himself.

Radcliffe died on 26 June 1648, and was buried in St Mary's Church.

Academic offices
Preceded by Thomas Singleton	Principal of Brasenose College, Oxford; 1612–1648	Succeeded by Daniel Greenwood
