= Fitzherbert Adams =

British academic administrator, clergyman, and benefactor

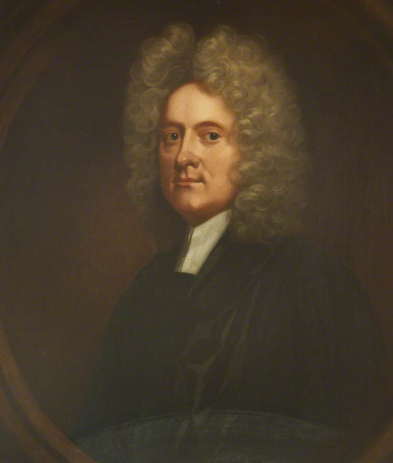
Fitzherbert Adams (1679)

Fitzherbert Adams D.D. (1651 – 17 June 1719) was a man of learning, and benefactor of the University of Oxford.

Adams was educated at Lincoln College, Oxford, where he took his Master's degree on 4 June 1675, that of Bachelor of Divinity on 23 January, and Doctor of Divinity on 3 July 1685. He was inducted to the rectory of Waddington, Lincolnshire, on 29 September 1683, and elected Rector of Lincoln College on 2 May 1685. The same year, he was installed a prebendary of the sixth stall, Durham, was removed to the tenth in 1695, and from that to the eleventh, in 1711. He served the office of Vice-Chancellor of Oxford University during 1695–7, and died on 17 June 1719.

As Rector of Lincoln College, he held the living of Twyford, Buckinghamshire; and having received £1,500 for renewing the lease, he laid out the whole in beautifying the chapel of his college, and the Rector's lodgings. He bequeathed his library also to the College, and was a benefactor to All Saints Church, Oxford, where he lies buried, contributing £200 to purchase a parsonage house.

Academic offices
Preceded by Thomas Marshall	Rector of Lincoln College, Oxford; 1685–1719	Succeeded by John Morley
Preceded by Henry Aldrich	Vice-Chancellor of Oxford University; 1695–1697	Succeeded by John Meare
