= Henry Langley (Master of Pembroke) =

English clergyman and academic

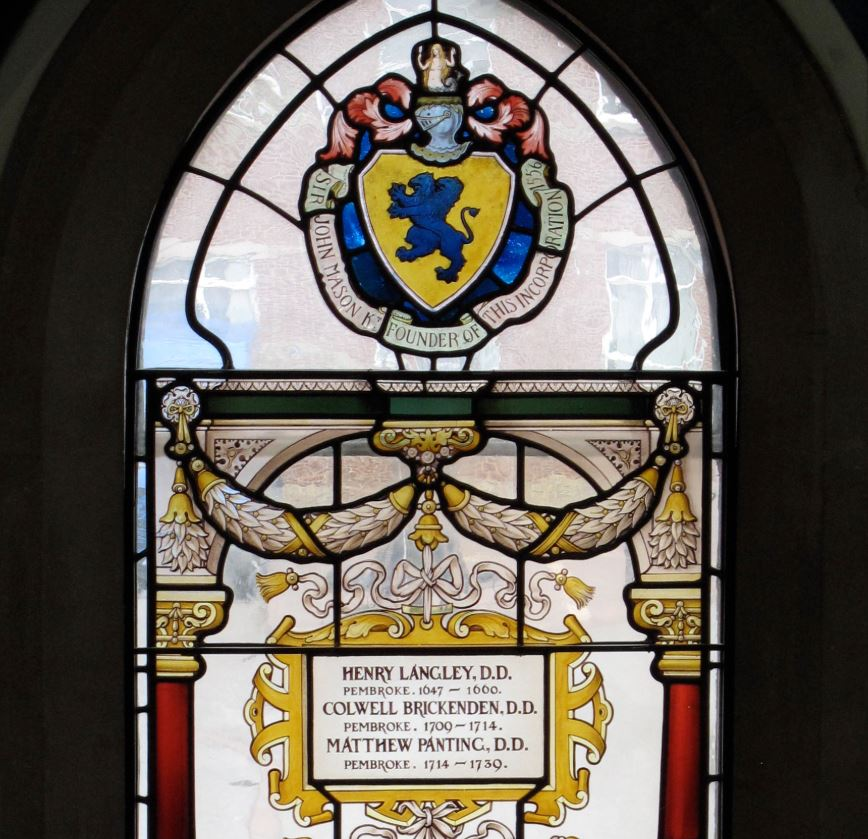
- Photograph of stained glass in the Grundy Library (by Charles Eamer Kempe). The name of Henry Langley appears as an Old Abingdonian who became a master of an Oxford college
- Born: 1611; Abingdon-on-Thames
- Died: 1679 (aged 67–68); Abingdon-on-Thames

Henry Langley (1611–1679) was an English clergyman and academic, intruded Master of Pembroke College, Oxford, and later an ejected minister and nonconformist tutor.

== Education and early life ==
He was son of Thomas Langley, a shoemaker, of Abingdon, Berkshire. He attended John Roysse's Free School in Abingdon (now Abingdon School) from 1622 to 1627. He was elected a chorister of Magdalen College, Oxford, in 1627, and on 6 November 1629 matriculated from Pembroke College, of which he subsequently became Fellow, graduating B.A. in 1632, and proceeding M.A. in 1635, B.D. in 1648, and D.D. in 1649.

== Career ==
He was appointed rector of St. Mary, Newington, Surrey, by a parliamentary order of 20 June 1643. By a parliamentary order of 10 September 1646 he was named one of the seven presbyterian ministers chosen to prepare the way for the reformation of the University of Oxford by the parliamentary visitors, and was authorised to preach in any church in Oxford he might choose for the purpose of winning the loyal scholars' submission to the parliamentary innovations. On the death, on 10 July 1647, of Thomas Clayton, Master of Pembroke, the fellows elected Henry Wightwick to the vacant post, but their choice was overruled by the parliament. Langley was nominated on 26 August 1647, and his appointment was confirmed by the parliamentary visitors on 8 October following. He became a delegate to the visitors on 30 September in the same year, served as one of the twenty delegates appointed by the proctors (19 May 1648) to answer and act in all things pertaining to the public good of the university, and on 5 July following was constituted member of the committee appointed for the examination of candidates for fellowships and scholarships.

Langley was nominated a canon of Christ Church by a parliamentary order of 2 March 1648, and held this post with the mastership of Pembroke till his ejection at the Restoration, when he retired to Tubney, near Abingdon. According to Anthony Wood, Langley took boarders into his house, and taught them logic and philosophy. On the appearance in March 1671–2 of the Declaration of Indulgence to dissenters, he was chosen with three others to continue a course of preaching within the city of Oxford, in direct opposition to the will of the university authorities. Wood says that he was a constant preacher at Tom Pun's house in Broken Hayes. He died on or about 10 September 1679, and was buried in St. Helen's Church, Abingdon.

== See also ==
- List of Old Abingdonians
