= Tom Brown (satirist) =

English translator and satirist

- Born: 1662
- Died: 18 June 1704 (aged 41)
- Occupation: Satirist

Thomas Brown (1662 – 18 June 1704) was an English translator and satirist, largely forgotten today save for a four-line gibe that he may have written concerning John Fell.

== Biography ==
=== Early life ===
Brown was born at either Shifnal or Newport in Shropshire; he is identified with the Thomas Brown, son of William and Dorothy Brown, who was recorded christened on 1 January 1663 at Newport. His father, a farmer and tanner, died when Thomas was eight years old. He took advantage of the free schooling offered in the county, attending Adams' Grammar School at Newport, before going up to Christ Church, Oxford and there meeting the college's dean, John Fell.

Fell was well known as a disciplinarian, and Brown throughout his life displayed a disdain for restrictions. The legend behind Brown's most recognised work is therefore plausible: it states that Brown got into trouble while at Oxford, and was threatened with expulsion, but that Fell offered to spare Brown if he could translate an epigram from Martial (I, 32, 1):

Non amo te, Sabidi, nec possum dicere quare;
Hoc tantum possum dicere, non amo te.

According to the story, Brown replied extemporaneously:

I do not love thee, Dr Fell,
The reason why I cannot tell;
But this I know, and know full well,
I do not love thee, Dr Fell.

Fell is said to have stayed Brown's dismissal from the college in admiration of this translation. However, the story is of apocryphal provenance, and it is known that Brown left Christ Church without a degree, moving to Kingston upon Thames where he stayed three years as a schoolmaster, and later to London, where he took up residence on Aldersgate Street in the Grub Street district.

=== Career ===
After some years spent as headmaster of the free school at Kingston upon Thames, Brown moved to London to live by his pen. Remembered now mainly for his witty political satires, he also wrote three stage plays, including The Dispensary (1697), and a large number of essays. A life-long friend of Aphra Behn, Brown assisted in her literary career.

Brown made a modest living from his writing in Latin, French and English, in addition to offering services of translation. He translated copiously from Latin and Greek, French, Italian, and Spanish. The list of the translated authors includes, among others, Catullus, Cicero, Horace, Martial, Persius, Pliny, Petronius, and Lucian. He refrained, however, from ever attaching himself to a patron, and expressed contempt toward those who did so. He pursued a libertine lifestyle, and his satirical works gained him several enemies in their subjects.

His best-known works, apart from the quatrain, are probably Amusements Serious and Comical, calculated for the Meridian of London (1700) and Letters from the Dead to the Living (1702), although his writings were quite prolific. Several works of the period whose author is unknown are suspected to be his.

Toward the end of his life he began to regret the licentiousness with which he had lived it, and on his deathbed he secured from his publisher (one Sam Briscoe) a promise that any posthumously published works would be censored of "all prophane, undecent passages". The promise was promptly reneged upon.

Many of Brown's works went unpublished until his death, and the publication date of many is in question, as is his stature as a writer. Contemporary opinion was mixed; Jonathan Swift spoke quite highly of Brown's work, and indeed parts of Gulliver's Travels and other of Swift's works may have been significantly influenced by Brown's writings. Henry Fielding, in Tom Jones, calls him (through the words of Benjamin the barber) "one of the greatest wits that ever the nation produced". On the other hand, those whom Brown mercilessly lampooned during his lifetime understandably did nothing to further his good reputation after his demise.

The 1911 Encyclopædia Britannica gives this verdict: "He was the author of a great variety of poems, letters, dialogues and lampoons, full of humour and erudition, but coarse and scurrilous. His writings have a certain value for the knowledge they display of low life in London." Presently the best description of Brown's legacy may be that of Joseph Addison, who accorded him the appellation "T-m Br-wn of facetious Memory". He was buried in the grounds of Westminster Abbey.

== Bibliography ==
- Bullen, Arthur Henry. "Brown, Thomas (1663-1704)" . In Stephen, Leslie (ed.). Dictionary of National Biography. Vol. 07. London: Smith, Elder & Co.
- Fordoński, Krzysztof and Piotr Urbański, eds., Casimir Britannicus: English Translations, Paraphrases, and Emulations of the Poetry of Maciej Kazimierz Sarbiewski. London: Modern Humanities Research Association, 2010.
