= John Edwards (academic) =

John Edwards (also Edwardes) M.D. (27 February 1600 – late 1650s) was an English academic, headmaster and physician. He was noted as a Royalist supporter in the University of Oxford.

== Life ==
Edwards was born 27 February 1600, and was educated at Merchant Taylors' School. In 1617 he was elected to a probationary fellowship at St John's College, Oxford. The former President of the college, William Laud, in 1632 recommended Edwards for the head-mastership of Merchant Taylors' School. He resigned this post at the close of 1634, and returned to Oxford.

There Edwards served the office of proctor in the following year. In 1638 he was appointed Sedleian reader of natural philosophy, and proceeded to the degrees of M.B. and M.D. He appears to have resided in college during the troubled times that followed. In 1642, when the First English Civil War broke out, he was, with others, appointed by Convocation to provide accommodation for the troopers sent to Oxford, and procure arms to defend the university.

In 1647 Edwards was summoned, as a delinquent, to appear before the committee of Lords and Commons for regulating the affairs of the university. His answers were considered unsatisfactory, he was placed by the parliamentary visitors in 1648 for a time in custody of the provost marshal for "manifold misdemeanours". His fellowship was taken from him, and he was superseded in the office of Sedleian reader by Joshua Crosse of Magdalen College. He was, however, paid for the readership until Michaelmas 1649. He is assumed to have worked subsequently in Oxford as a physician, and to have died in the later 1650s.

== Notes ==
Attribution

This article incorporates text from a publication now in the public domain: Stephen, Leslie, ed. (1889). "Edwards, John (fl.1638)". Dictionary of National Biography. Vol. 17. London: Smith, Elder & Co.
