= Richard Kilby =

Richard Kilby (Kilbye) (1560–1620) was an English scholar and priest.

== Life ==
He was born in Ratcliffe-on-the-Wreake, Leicestershire. He matriculated at Lincoln College, Oxford on 20 December 1577, and was elected fellow on 18 January 1578. He was admitted B.A. on 9 December 1578, M.A. in 1582, B.D. and D.D. in 1596. On 10 December 1590, he was elected rector of Lincoln College. He was appointed Regius Professor of Hebrew in 1610, and served in the "First Oxford Company" charged by James I of England with translating the latter part of the Old Testament for the King James Version of the Bible.

== Works ==
He published a funeral sermon on Thomas Holland, in 1613, and also a volume of commentary on the Book of Exodus, drawn from earlier Hebrew rabbinical studies. His continuation of John Mercer's commentary on Genesis was submitted for approval (1598), but he was not allowed to print it.

== Notes ==
Attribution

This article incorporates text from a publication now in the public domain: "Kilbye, Richard". Dictionary of National Biography. London: Smith, Elder & Co. 1885–1900.

Academic offices
Preceded by John Underhill	Rector of Lincoln College, Oxford; 1590–1620	Succeeded by Paul Hood
