= Thomas Jackson (theologian) =

English theologian

Thomas Jackson (1579 – 1640) was an English theologian, and President of Corpus Christi College, Oxford. Originally a Calvinist, he became in later life an Arminian.

== Life ==
He was born at Witton-le-Wear, County Durham, and educated at the University of Oxford, where he attended Queen’s College from 1595. He became a probationer fellow of Corpus Christi College in 1606, and was soon afterwards elected vice-president there.

In 1623 James Thomas Jackson was presented to the living of St Nicholas, Newcastle, and about 1625 to the living of Winston, County Durham. In 1631 he was appointed President of Corpus; and in 1632 Charles I presented him to the living of Witney, Oxfordshire. He was made a prebendary of Winchester in 1635, and was Dean of Peterborough from 1635 to 1639.

== Works ==
His chief work was a series of commentaries on the Apostles' Creed, the first complete edition being entitled The Works of Thomas Jackson, D.D. (London, 1673), edited by Barnabas Oley. The commentaries were originally published in 1613 to 1657, as twelve books with different titles, the first being The Eternal Truth of Scriptures (London, 1613).

== Views ==
Strongly against the Catholic doctrine on transubstantiation, he belonged to the "Durham House group" headed by Richard Neile. He was an early anti-Calvinist among Oxford theologians. He made his views known only in the late 1620s, but stated that around 1605 he had already decided against predestination.

In theology he was a syncretic Platonist. He took an interest in the Epicurean view of free will, but argued for a middle way accommodating the Stoic criticism of the Epicureans. His humanistic Platonism has been compared to that of Robert Burton; and William Prynne, arguing against William Laud's promotion of Jackson, claimed his learning only made him more dangerous.

Academic offices
Preceded by John Holt	President of Corpus Christi College, Oxford; 1631 – 1640	Succeeded by Robert Newlin
