= Henry Tozer (priest) =

English Anglican priest

Henry Tozer (1602–1650) was an English priest and academic, a Puritan of royalist views, elected to the Westminster Assembly but never sitting there.

== Life ==
Born at North Tawton, Devon, he matriculated at Exeter College, Oxford on 3 May 1621, and graduated Bachelor of Arts (BA) on 18 June 1623, and Oxford Master of Arts (MA Oxon) on 28 April 1626. He took holy orders, was appointed lecturer at St Martin's Church (Carfax, Oxford) on 21 October 1632, and proceeded Bachelor of Divinity (BD) on 28 July 1636. Of puritan views, he was elected in 1643 to the Westminster Assembly, but refused to sit; he also declined the degree of Doctor of Divinity (DD) when nominated for it on 6 June 1646. Tozer was appointed vicar of Yarnton in 1644, but was an absentee.

As bursar and sub-rector of Exeter College, Tozer managed the college in the absence of George Hakewill, the rector. In March 1647 he was cited before the parliamentary visitors for continuing the Book of Common Prayer, and for his known dislike of parliamentarians. In November he was summoned to Westminster before the parliamentary commission, and the following year was imprisoned for some days on refusing to give up the college books. He was expelled from his fellowship on 26 May 1648, and on 4 June turned out of St. Martin's Church by soldiers because he prayed for the king. The decree, however, was revoked on 2 November, and Tozer was allowed to travel for three years, retaining his room in Exeter College.

Tozer then went to Holland, and became minister to the English merchants at Rotterdam, where he died on 11 September 1650; he was buried in the English church there.

== Works ==
He was author of the following works published at Oxford:

- Directions for a Godly Life, dedicated to his pupil Lorenzo Cary, son of Viscount Falkland, 1628, 5th ed. 1640, 8th 1671, 10th 1680, 11th 1690, 13th 1706.
- A Christian Amendment, 1633.
- Christus: sive Dicta Facta Christi, 1634.
- Christian Wisdome, 1639.
