= Robert Shippen =

English academic administrator

- Born: (1675–1745)
- Citizenship: United Kingdom

Robert Shippen D.D. FRS (1675–1745) was an English academic administrator at the University of Oxford.

Shippen was the brother of the Tory politician William Shippen. He was educated at Stockport Grammar School and Merton College, Oxford. He matriculated at Merton College on 6 April 1693 and graduated with a Bachelor of Arts degree in 1696.

Shippen acted as a tutor at Brasenose College, Oxford was awarded a Master of Arts degree on 4 July 1699. He was then elected a Fellow of Brasenose College. He was elected Professor of Music at Gresham College in London on 4 December 1705 and a Fellow of the Royal Society in 1706. He benefited from the living of St Stephen's, Limehouse. Shippen was elected Principal (head) of Brasenose College, Oxford in 1710 and attained a Doctor of Divinity. He held the post of Principal of Brasenose until his death in 1745. During his time as President of Brasenose College, Shippen was also Vice-Chancellor of Oxford University from 1718 until 1723.

In 1710, the same year he became Principal of Brasenose, he married Frances (died 1728), daughter of Richard Legh of Lyme Park, and widow of Sir Gilbert Clerke of Chilcote. Following this, on 3 October 1710 he resigned his professorship at Gresham College in favour of his elder brother, Edward Shippen (1671–1724), who had graduated from Brasenose with an M.A. in 1693, and M.D. in 1699.

Robert Shippen was buried in the chapel at Brasenose College, where he is commemorated with an epitaph (by Dr Frewin) and a bust.

Academic offices
Preceded by John Meare	Principal of Brasenose College, Oxford; 1710–1745	Succeeded by Francis Yarborough
Preceded by John Baron	Vice-Chancellor of Oxford University; 1718–1723	Succeeded by Edward Butler
