= St Mildred, Poultry =

Former church-site in London

Coordinates: 51°30′49″N 0°5′24″W

St. Mildred, Poultry
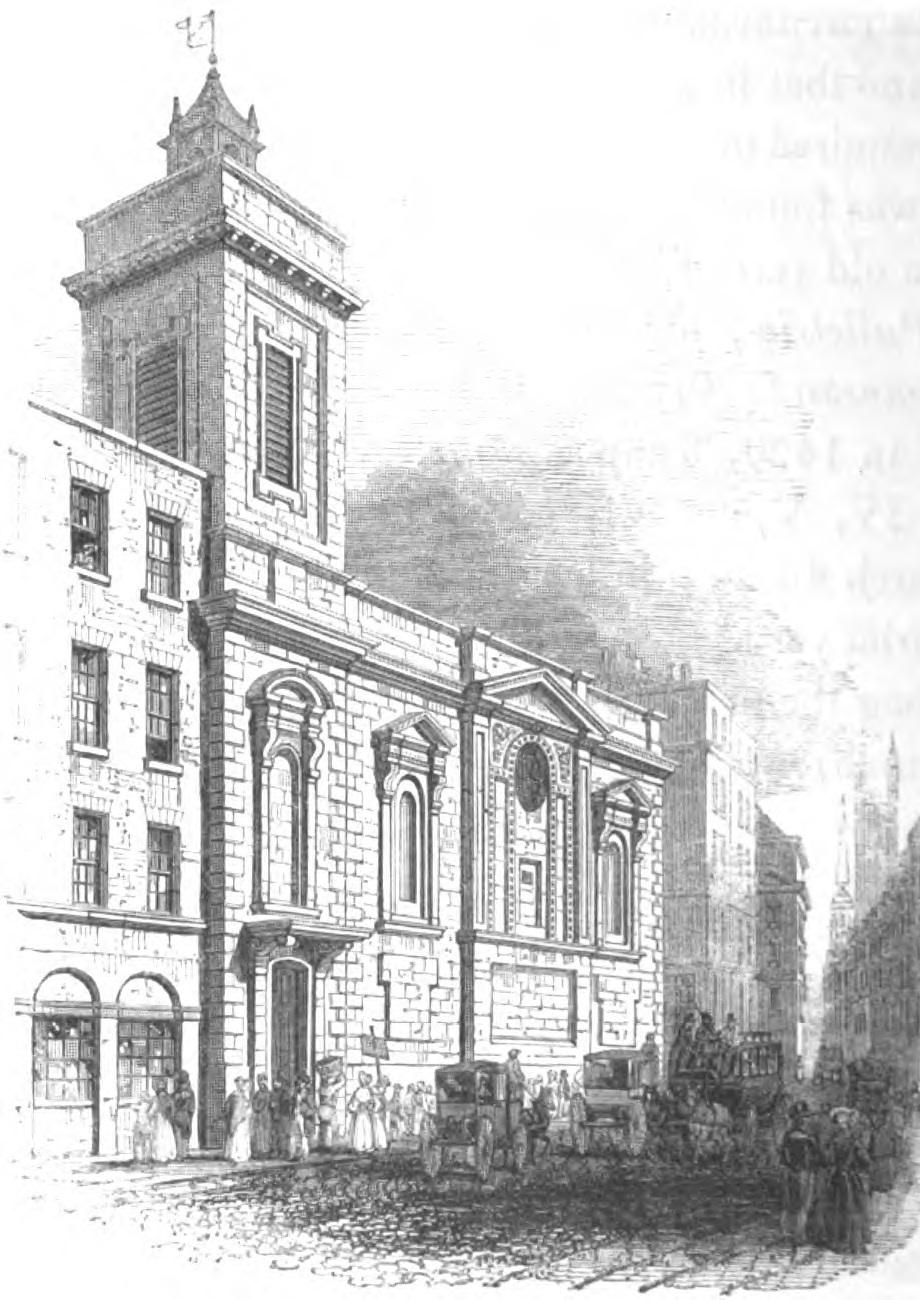
- St. Mildred, Poultry in the 1820s
- St. Mildred, Poultry
- Location: London
- Country: England
- Denomination: Church of England

Architecture
- Demolished: 1872

St Mildred, Poultry, was a parish church in the Cheap ward of the City of London dedicated to Anglo-Saxon Saint Mildred. It was rebuilt after the Great Fire of London, and demolished in 1872. St Mildred in the Poultry was the burial place of the writer Thomas Tusser. Some description of the church and its monuments is given in John Stow's Survey of London.

== History ==
=== Medieval building ===
The church stood on the north side of Poultry at its junction with Mansion House Street. The first church can be traced back to 1175, in the reign of Henry II; by 1456 it had fallen into disrepair, and had to be taken down and rebuilt.

=== Rebuilding after the Great Fire ===
The medieval building was destroyed in the Great Fire of London in 1666. A new church was completed in 1676 to the designs of Sir Christopher Wren, after which the parish was united with that of St Mary Colechurch, which was not rebuilt. George Godwin described the interior of the new church as "a simple room with a flat ceiling coved at the sides … remarkable for nothing but a strange want of symmetry apparent at the west end". It was 56 feet long, 42 feet wide and 36 feet high. The most ornamented part of the exterior was the south side, towards Poultry, with a central pediment and Ionic pilasters. There was a 75-foot-high tower, topped by a copper weather vane in the form of a ship.

An organ was provided in the mid-eighteenth century by George England.

=== Demolition ===
The building was sold for £50,200 in 1871 under the Union of Benefices Act 1860, and demolished the following year. A City of London Corporation plaque now marks the site. The parish was united with that of St Olave Old Jewry, and the church's weather vane sent there. The proceeds of the sale were used to build and endow the new church of St Paul, Goswell Road, which also received the City church's pulpit and woodwork. When the parish of St Olave also ceased to be viable, the combined parishes were in turn united with St Margaret Lothbury.

== Rectors (incomplete list) ==
- 1523–1527 John Smith
- 1541 John Weale
- 1590–1617 Thomas Sorocold
- 1618–1638 Nathaniel Shute
- 1638, ejected Richard Maden
- 1645–1646 Henry Scudder as minister
- 1661–1673 Richard Perrinchief, Archdeacon of Huntingdon
- 1673–1696 John Williams
- 1726–1748 William Wallis
- 1748–1775 Benjamin (John) Newcombe, Dean of Rochester
- 1775–1806 Robert Bromley

== See also ==
- List of Christopher Wren churches in London
- List of churches rebuilt after the Great Fire but since demolished
