= Robert Newlyn (priest) =

English clergyman and academic

Robert Newlyn (1597–1688) was an English clergyman and academic. He was president of Corpus Christi College, Oxford, from 1640 to 1648, was expelled by the parliamentary visitation of Oxford, and returned as president in 1660.

== Life ==
He was born in Priors Dean, Hampshire. He matriculated at Oxford in 1614 and graduated B.A. at Corpus Christi, in 1616, M.A. in 1620. He became a Fellow of his college in 1622. He was B.D. in 1628, and D.D. in 1640.

He became rector of Ham, Wiltshire in 1643. In 1659 he married Jane, daughter of Daniel Collins and William Dring. They had no children, but his second presidency was noted for the conspicuous nepotism Newlyn applied to admissions and college posts. He was rector of Wroughton, Wiltshire from 1660.

== Notes ==
Academic offices
Preceded by Thomas Jackson	President of Corpus Christi College, Oxford; 1640-1648	Succeeded by Edmund Staunton
Preceded by Edmund Staunton	President of Corpus Christi College, Oxford; 1660-1688	Succeeded by Thomas Turner
