= John Owen (theologian) =

English theologian (1616–1683)

The Reverend John Owen
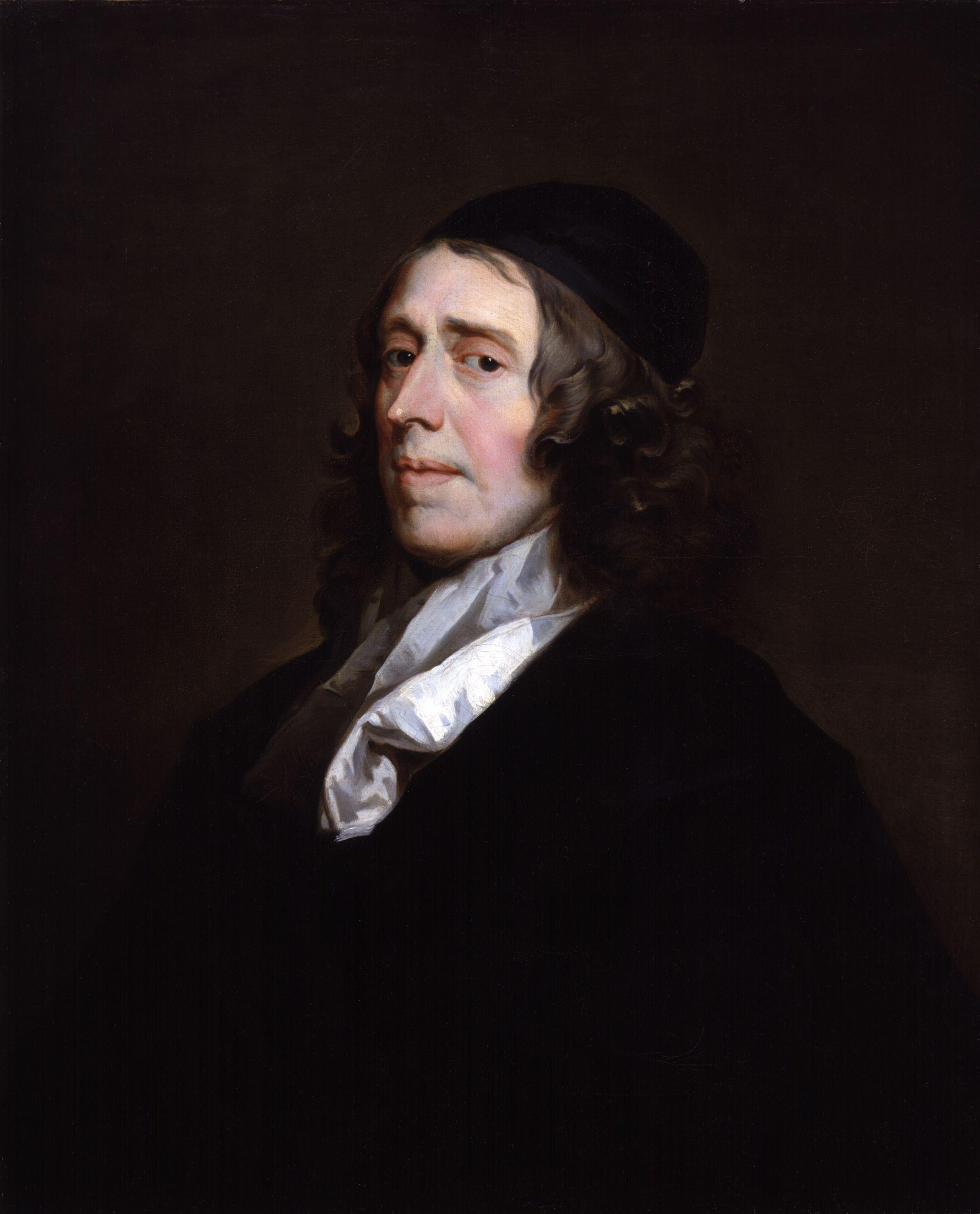
- Born: 1616; Stadhampton, Oxfordshire, England
- Died: August 1683 (aged 66–67); Ealing, Middlesex, England
- Education: The Queen’s College, Oxford
- Occupations: Theologian, pastor, academic administrator
- Notable work: Communion with God; The Mortification of Sin; The Divine Power of the Gospel; The Death of Death in the Death of Christ
- Spouse: Mary Rooke

Vice-Chancellor of the University of Oxford
- In office 1652–1657
- Chancellor: Oliver Cromwell
- Preceded by: Daniel Greenwood
- Succeeded by: John Conant

John Owen (1616 – 24 August 1683) was an English Puritan Nonconformist church leader, theologian, and vice-chancellor of the University of Oxford. One of the most prominent theologians in England during his lifetime, Owen was a prolific author who wrote articles, treatises, Biblical commentaries, poetry, children's catechisms, and other works. Many of Owen's works reflect the Reformed tradition of Christianity. Owen is still widely read by Reformed Christians today, and is known particularly for his writings on sin and human depravity.

He was briefly a member of parliament for the university's constituency, sitting in the First Protectorate Parliament of 1654 to 1655. Owen's support for the parliamentarians (Roundheads) during the English Civil War resulted in him preaching a sermon before parliament on the day following the execution of Charles I, and later serving as an aide and chaplain to Oliver Cromwell.

== Early life ==
Of Welsh descent, Owen was born at Stadhampton in Oxfordshire, and was educated at Queen's College, Oxford (B.A. 1632, M.A. 1635); at the time the college was noted, according to Thomas Fuller, for its metaphysicians. A Puritan by upbringing, in 1637 Owen was driven from Oxford by Laud's new statutes, and became chaplain and tutor in the family of Sir Robert Dormer and then in that of Lord Lovelace. At the outbreak of the English Civil War he sided with the parliament, and thus lost both his place and the prospects of succeeding to his Welsh Royalist uncle's fortune. For a while he lived in Charterhouse Yard, troubled by religious questions. His doubts were removed by a sermon preached by a stranger in the church of St Mary Aldermanbury where he had gone intending to hear Edmund Calamy the Elder. Owen's first publication, The Display of Arminianism (synergism) (1642), was a spirited defence of Calvinism (monergism). It was dedicated to the committee of religion, and gained him the living of Fordham in Essex, from which a "scandalous minister" had been ejected. At Fordham he remained engrossed in the work of his parish and writing only The Duty of Pastors and People Distinguished until 1646, when, the old incumbent dying, the presentation lapsed to the patron, who gave it to someone else.

In 1644, Owen married Mary Rooke (d. 1675). The couple had 11 children, ten of whom died in infancy. One daughter survived to adulthood, married, and shortly thereafter died of consumption. Eighteen months after his first wife's death, he married Dorothy D'Oyley, the wealthy widow of Thomas D'Oyley, a member of the landlords' family at Stadhampton.

== Career ==
On 29 April he preached before the Long Parliament. In this sermon, and in his Country Essay for the Practice of Church Government, which he appended to it, his tendency to break away from Presbyterianism to the Independent or Congregational system is seen. Like John Milton, he saw little to choose between "new presbyter" and "old priest."

He became pastor at Coggeshall in Essex, with a large influx of Flemish tradesmen. His adoption of Congregational principles did not affect his theological position, and in 1647 he again argued against Arminianism in The Death of Death in the Death of Christ, which drew him into long debate with Richard Baxter. He made the friendship of Fairfax while the latter was besieging Colchester, and addressed the army there against religious persecution. He was chosen to preach to parliament on the day after the execution of King Charles I, and succeeded in fulfilling his task without directly mentioning that event.

Another sermon preached on 29 April, a plea for sincerity of religion in high places, won not only the thanks of parliament but the friendship of Oliver Cromwell, who took Owen to Ireland as his chaplain, that he might regulate the affairs of Trinity College, Dublin. He pleaded with the House of Commons for the religious needs of Ireland as some years earlier he had pleaded for those of Wales. In 1650 he accompanied Cromwell on his Scottish campaign. In March 1651, Cromwell, as Chancellor of Oxford University, gave him the deanery of Christ Church Cathedral, Oxford, and made him Vice-Chancellor of Oxford University in September 1652; in both offices he succeeded the Presbyterian, Edward Reynolds.

During his eight years of official Oxford life Owen showed himself a firm disciplinarian, thorough in his methods, though, as John Locke testifies, the Aristotelian traditions in education underwent no change. With Philip Nye he unmasked the popular astrologer, William Lilly, and in spite of his share in condemning two Quakeresses to be whipped for disturbing the peace, his rule was not intolerant. Anglican services were conducted here and there, and at Christ Church itself the Anglican chaplain remained in the college. While little encouragement was given to a spirit of free inquiry, Puritanism at Oxford was not simply an attempt to force education and culture into "the leaden moulds of Calvinistic theology." Owen, unlike many of his contemporaries, was more interested in the New Testament than in the Old. During his Oxford years he wrote Justitia Divina (1653), an exposition of the dogma that God cannot forgive sin without an atonement; Communion with God (1657), Doctrine of the Saints' Perseverance (1654), his final attack on Arminianism; Vindiciae Evangelicae (1655), a treatise written by order of the Council of State against Socinianism as expounded by John Biddle; On the Mortification of Sin in Believers (1656), an introspective and analytic work; Schism (1657), one of the most readable of all his writings; Of Temptation (1658), an attempt to recall Puritanism to its cardinal spiritual attitude from the jarring anarchy of sectarianism and the pharisaism which had followed on popularity and threatened to destroy the early simplicity.

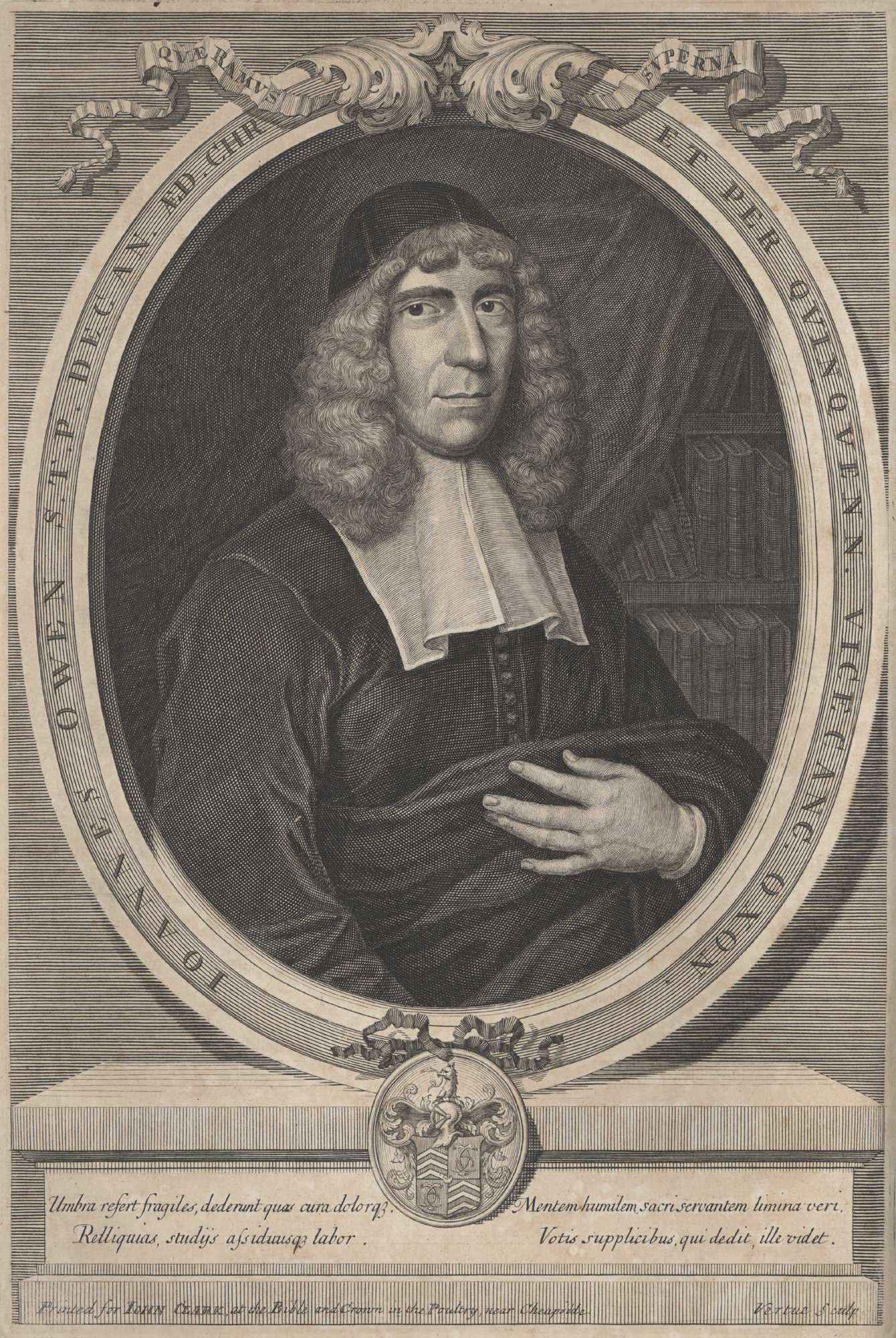
John Owen in a frontispiece.

== Political life ==
Besides his academic and literary concerns, Owen was continually involved in affairs of state. In 1651, on 24 October (after Worcester), he preached the thanksgiving sermon before parliament. In 1652 he sat on a council to consider the condition of Protestantism in Ireland. In October 1653 he was one of several ministers whom Cromwell summoned to a consultation as to church union. In December, the degree of Doctor of Divinity was conferred upon him by Oxford University. In the First Protectorate Parliament of 1654 he sat, for a short time, as the sole member of parliament for Oxford University, and, with Baxter, was placed on the committee for settling the "fundamentals" necessary for the toleration promised in the Instrument of Government. In the same year he was chairman of a committee on Scottish Church affairs. He was, too, one of the Triers, and appears to have behaved with kindness and moderation in that capacity. As vice-chancellor he acted with readiness and spirit when a Royalist rising in Wiltshire broke out in 1655; his adherence to Cromwell, however, was by no means slavish, for he drew up, at the request of Desborough and Pride, a petition against his receiving the kingship. Thus, when Richard Cromwell succeeded his father as chancellor, Owen lost his vice-chancellorship. In 1658 he took a leading part in the conference of Independents which drew up the Savoy Declaration (the doctrinal standard of Congregationalism which was based upon the Westminster Confession of Faith).

On Oliver Cromwell's death in 1658, Owen joined the Wallingford House party, and though he denied any share in the deposition of Richard Cromwell, he preferred the idea of a simple republic to that of a protectorate. He assisted in the restoration of the Rump Parliament, and, when George Monck began his march into England, Owen, in the name of the Independent churches, to which Monck was supposed to belong, and who were anxious about his intentions, wrote to dissuade him. In March 1660, the Presbyterian party being uppermost, Owen was deprived of his deanery, which was given back to Reynolds. He retired to Stadham, where he wrote various controversial and theological works, in particular his laborious Theologoumena Pantodapa, a history of the rise and progress of theology. The respect in which many of the authorities held his intellectual eminence won him an immunity denied to other Nonconformists. In 1661 the celebrated Fiat Lux, a work by the Franciscan friar John Vincent Cane, was published; in it, the oneness and beauty of Roman Catholicism are contrasted with the confusion and multiplicity of Protestant sects. At Clarendon's request Owen answered this in 1662 in his Animadversions; and so great was the success of that work that he was offered preferment if he would conform. Owen's condition was liberty to all who disagreed in doctrine with the Church of England; nothing therefore came of the negotiation.

In 1663, Owen was invited by the Congregational churches in Boston, Massachusetts, to become their minister, but declined. The Conventicle and Five Mile Acts drove him to London; and in 1666, after the Great Fire, he, like other leading Nonconformist ministers, set up a room for public service and gathered a congregation, composed chiefly of the old Commonwealth officers. An 1862 source says "this congregation was distinguished more for the rank and worth of its members than for its numbers" and gives as examples John Desborough, the soldier who married Cromwell's sister; James Berry (Major-General), another soldier; Charles Fleetwood, the soldier who married Cromwell's daughter; Bridget Bendish, Fleetwood's stepdaughter; Sir John Hartopp and his wife, Fleetwood's daughter Elizabeth; Mary, Lady Abney of Abney Park, next door neighbour to the Fleetwoods; and Lady Haversham.

Meanwhile, Owen was incessantly writing; and in 1667 he published his Catechism, which led to a proposal, "more acute than diplomatic", from Baxter for union. Various papers passed, and after a year the attempt was closed by the following laconical note from Owen: "I am still a well-wisher to these mathematics." It was now, too, that he published the first part of his vast work upon the Epistle to the Hebrews, together with his Practical Exposition upon Psalm 130 (1668) and his searching book on Indwelling Sin, which Alexander Whyte described as "one of the greatest works of the Puritan period."

In 1669, Owen wrote a spirited remonstrance to the Congregationalists in New England, who, under the influence of Presbyterianism, had shown themselves persecutors. At home, too, he was busy in the same cause. In 1669 Samuel Parker's Discourse of Ecclesiastical Politie attacked the Nonconformists with clumsy intolerance. Owen answered him (Truth and Innocence Vindicated, 1669); Parker replied offensively in his Defence and Continuation of the Ecclesiastical Politie (1671). Then Andrew Marvell finally disposed of Parker with banter and satire in The Rehearsal Transpros'd (1672 and 1673). Owen himself produced a tract On the Trinity (1669), and Christian Love and Peace (1672).

On the revival of the Conventicle Acts in 1670, Owen was appointed to draw up a paper of reasons which was submitted to the House of Lords in protest. In this or the following year Harvard College invited him to become its president; he received similar invitations from some of the Dutch universities. When King Charles II issued his Declaration of Indulgence in 1672, Owen drew up an address of thanks; Owen was one of the first preachers at the weekly lectures which the Independents and Presbyterians jointly held at Princes' Hall in Broad Street. He was respected by many of the nobility, and during 1674 both King Charles II and his brother King James II assured him of their good wishes to the dissenters. Charles gave him 1000 guineas to relieve those on whom the severe laws had pressed, and he was able to procure the release of John Bunyan, whose preaching he admired. In 1674 Owen was attacked by William Sherlock, Dean of St Paul's. From this time until 1680, he was engaged on his ministry and writing. He had Alexander Shields as his amanuensis for a while.

== Later life ==
The chief of his later writings were On Apostasy (1676), a sad account of religion under the Restoration; On the Holy Spirit (1677–78) and The Doctrine of Justification (1677). In 1680, however, Stillingfleet having on 11 May preached his sermon on "The Mischief of Separation," Owen defended the Nonconformists from the charge of schism in his Brief Vindication. Baxter and Howe also answered Stillingfleet, who replied in The Unreasonableness of Separation. Owen again answered this, and then left the controversy to a swarm of eager combatants. From this time to his death he was occupied with continual writing, disturbed only by suffering from kidney stones and asthma, and by the absurd charge of being concerned in the Rye House Plot. His most important work was his Treatise on Evangelical Churches, in which were contained his latest views regarding church government. He died at Ealing, just twenty-one years after he had gone out with so many others on St Bartholomew's day in 1662, and was buried on 4 September 1683 in Bunhill Fields.

== Theological influence ==
The theology of justification as taught by John Owen was used by the Dutch minister Alexander Comrie (1706–74) of Woubrugge in his own polemics against what he saw as Dutch neonomians. Just as Owen, Comrie stresses the point that before God gives faith to the sinner, He looks to the merits of Christ. It is because of the merits of Christ that the sinner receives the gift of faith to believe in Christ for salvation. For Comrie, Owen was a theological authority who he could well use for his own theology of justification by faith.

== Works in print ==
As of 2007, the majority of Owen's voluminous works are still in print:

- Communion with God, Christian Heritage. ISBN 1-84550-209-4.
- Works of John Owen (2000). On CD-ROM from Ages Software. ISBN 5-550-03299-6. Of the Integrity and Purity of the Hebrew and Greek Text of the Scripture; with Considerations on the Prolegomena and Appendix to the Late "Biblia Polyglotta," in vol. IX, The Works of John Owen, ed. Gould, William H, & Quick, Charles W., Philadelphia, PA: Leighton Publications, (1865)
- Collected Works in 16 Volumes from the Banner of Truth Trust. ISBN 0-85151-392-1.
- Commentary on Hebrews in 7 volumes from the Banner of Truth Trust. ISBN 0-85151-619-X.
- The Mortification of Sin, Christian Heritage Publishers. ISBN 1-85792-107-0.
- Biblical Theology: The History of Theology From Adam to Christ or The Nature, Origin, Development, and Study of Theological Truth, In Six Books, Soli Deo Gloria Ministries. ISBN 1-877611-83-2.
- Sin & Temptation: The Challenge to Personal Godliness. An abridgement by James M. Houston for modern readers of two of Owen's works. ISBN 1-55661-830-1.
- The Glory of Christ: His Office and His Grace. ISBN 1-85792-474-6.
- John Owen on Temptation - The Nature and Power of it, The Danger of Entering it and the Means of Preventing the Danger, Diggory Press, ISBN 978-1-84685-749-2
- The Death of Death in the Death of Christ, Diggory Press, ISBN 978-1-84685-740-9
- The Divine Power of the Gospel, Diggory Press, ISBN 978-1-84685-740-9
- A Dissertation on Divine Justice, Diggory Press, ISBN 978-1-84685-785-0
- Gospel Grounds and Evidences of the Faith of God's Elect, Diggory Press, ISBN 978-1-84685-757-7
- John Owen on The Holy Spirit - The Spirit and Regeneration (Book III of Pneumatologia), Diggory Press, ISBN 978-1-84685-810-9
- John Owen on The Holy Spirit - The Spirit as a Comforter (Book VIII of Pneumatologia), Diggory Press, ISBN 978-1-84685-750-8
- John Owen on The Holy Spirit - The Spirit and Prayer (Book VII of Pneumatologia), Diggory Press, ISBN 978-1-84685-752-2
- John Owen on The Holy Spirit - The Spiritual Gifts (Book IX of Pneumatologia), Diggory Press, ISBN 978-1-84685-751-5
- The Oxford Orations of Dr. John Owen. Ed. Peter Toon. Trans. [from the Latin] supervised by John Glucker. Callington (Cornwall): Gospel Communication. 1971. ISBN 9780950125213 Online edition.
- A Brief Declaration and Vindication of the Doctrine of the Trinity, as also of the Person and Satisfaction of Christ (1699) - a refutation of Socinianism, in particular against the teaching of John Biddle.

== Sources ==
Academic offices
| Preceded by Edward Reynolds | Dean of Christ Church, Oxford; 1651–1660 | Succeeded by Edward Reynolds |
| Preceded by Daniel Greenwood | Vice-Chancellor of Oxford University; 1652–1657 | Succeeded by John Conant |
