= John Conant =

English clergyman

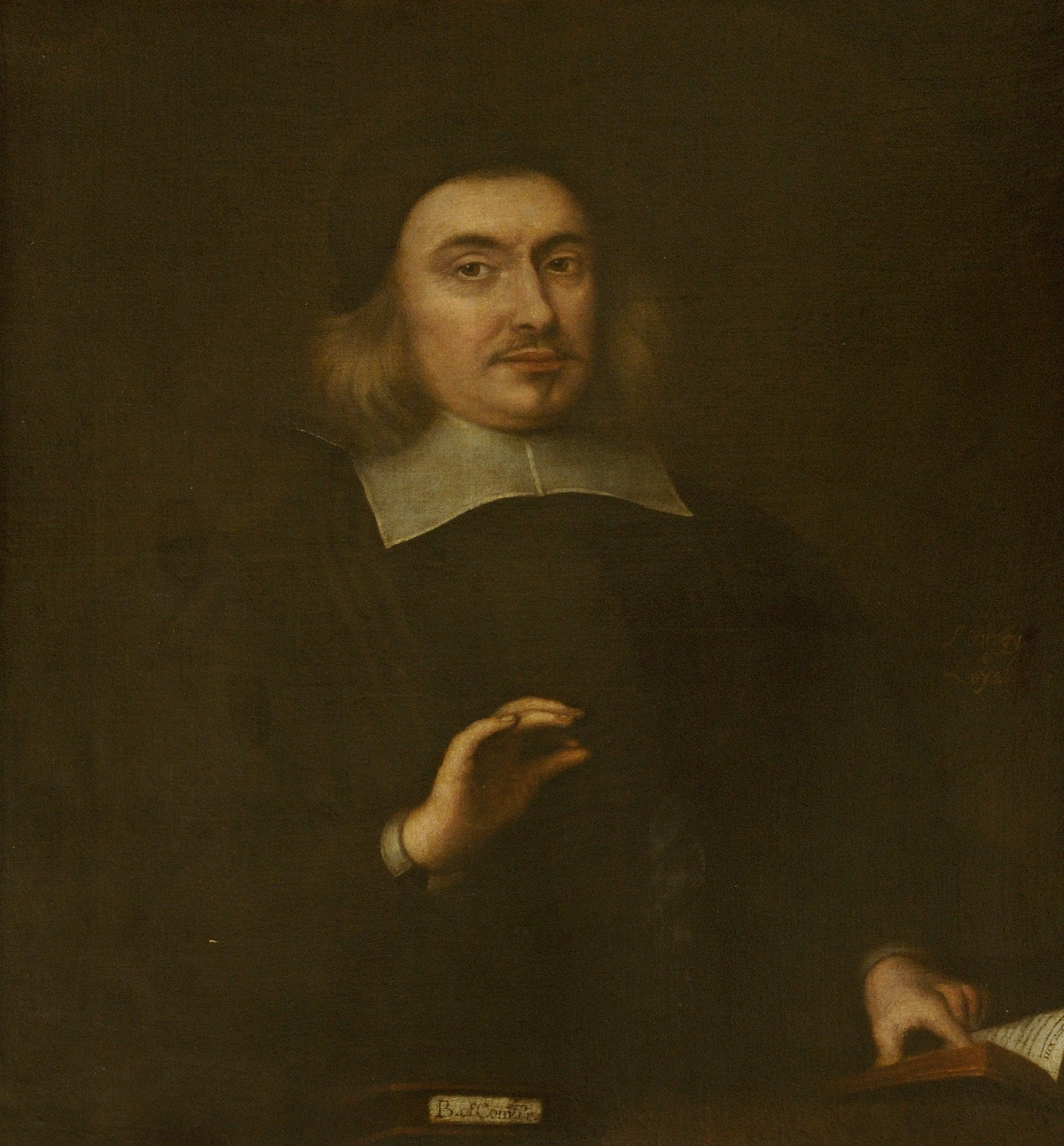
Conant in 1660 (artist unknown)

Rev. John Conant D.D. (18 October 1608 – 12 March 1694) was an English clergyman and theologian. He was Vice-Chancellor of Oxford University, and later archdeacon of Norwich.

== Life ==
Conant was born at Yettington, Bicton, in the south-east of Devon, England, the eldest son of Robert Conant, son of Richard Conant, and his wife Elizabeth Morris. He was educated first in the free school at Ilchester, Somerset, and then under the instruction of the schoolmaster Thomas Branker, with additional instruction by his uncle John, rector of Limington in Somerset. Taken by his uncle to Oxford in 1627, he was enrolled on 18 February as a commoner of Exeter College, Oxford. There he was tutored by Lawrence Bodley, nephew of the benefactor of the Bodleian Library. Conant quickly gained a mastery of Greek, debating publicly in that language, and also excelled in Hebrew, Syriac, and Arabic. His potential was recognised by John Prideaux, the anti-Arminian rector of Exeter, who commented that he found nothing difficult. John Conant graduated BA on 26 May 1631, and MA on 12 January 1634; on 30 June 1632 he was chosen a probationer of Exeter College, and on 3 July 1633 made a fellow. He was ordained deacon and tutored pupils until 1642, when the disruption of Oxford by the Civil War forced him to depart, abandoning valuable books, which he never regained.

Conant intended to join his uncle at Limington but found by the time he arrived that his uncle, a supporter of the parliamentary cause, had gone to London. There his uncle preached to the House of Commons on 26 July 1643, calling on it to reform the church, and he was a member of the Westminster Assembly (not the nephew, as some sources incorrectly assert). Remaining for a while at Limington, Conant preached and carried out parish duties, until so menaced by royalist troops that he joined his uncle in London and began to assist him in the parish of St Botolph, Aldersgate. He soon took up residence with the family of Lord and Lady Chandos at Harefield, Middlesex, whom he served as chaplain. Lady Chandos, the daughter of Henry Montagu, Earl of Manchester, was his patron, awarding him an annual stipend of £80, much of which he used to relieve the poor and needy of the parish, and provide them with bibles and schooling.

Meanwhile, he gave a weekday lecture for several years at nearby Uxbridge. On 20 December 1645 the committee for plundered ministers offered him the rectory of Whimple, Devon, but Conant refused it. When in 1647 subscription to the Solemn League and Covenant was required of college fellows, Conant refused to take it, writing a letter from Harefield dated 27 September 1647, resigning his fellowship at Exeter College.

In 1649, when George Hakewill the Rector of Exeter College died, a majority of the fellows wanted Conant's uncle for the position, but the elder Conant, wishing to remain at the parish of St Thomas, Salisbury, urged his nephew for the post; the nephew was duly elected on 7 June 1649, and admitted to the office on 29 June 1649. Confronted with the question of affirming his loyalty to the parliamentary government by taking the engagement, which in October 1649 was made mandatory for members of colleges, Conant took it, but declared to the commissioners that in doing so he was not abridging his liberty to declare allegiance to any other future power that God might put over him, and did not necessarily approve of all that the government had done.

Taking up his duties with alacrity, Conant was an ideal choice for rector. He found the college deficient in discipline and deeply in debt, and remedied both, enforcing strict observance of the college statutes. He also attended the academic exercises and daily prayers of the college and catechised the college servants. Refuting Socinianism and Roman Catholicism in weekly instruction to the undergraduates, he drew on such standard works of reformed scholasticism as Johannes Wollebius's Compendium theologiae Christianae and Johannes Piscator's Aphorismi doctrinae Christianae. For more advanced students he led a study of biblical prophecy, using Thomas Parker's The Visions and Prophecies of Daniel Expounded (1646), a book by a New England minister which asserted that the pope was the antichrist. Conant's style of leadership at Exeter attracted large numbers of students, including some from abroad. He was awarded the DD on 31 May 1654.

During his time as Rector of Exeter College, Conant preached regularly at three nearby parishes: he preached every Friday morning at seven o'clock at All Saints' for more than ten years, developing a complete body of divinity for his auditors; he preached almost every Sunday for several years at St Michael's; and he preached at St Mary Magdalen's every other Sunday for half of each year. As vicar of Kidlington, near Oxford, which was annexed to the rectory of Exeter, he also preached frequently, although he declined the rectory of Ewelme in Oxfordshire, which was also attached to the college.

In August 1651 he married Elizabeth Reynolds (died 1707), youngest daughter of Edward Reynolds, then rector of Braunston, Northamptonshire; the couple had six sons and six daughters.

Conant was presbyterially ordained to the ministry at Salisbury in October 1652, and in September 1654 he was appointed Regius Professor of Divinity at Oxford. He lectured twice a week to fulfil the duties of that office, basing his lectures on the biblical annotations of Hugo Grotius, whose philological scholarship was much admired even by those who rejected his Arminianism. In 1657, as compensation for the sequestered income of his divinity chair, Conant was awarded by Oliver Cromwell the income from the rectory of Abergele, Denbighshire, returning much of the money to its resident vicar and to the poor of the parish. None of his theological lectures were ever published, and Conant later destroyed his notes for them.

Shortly after Richard Cromwell succeeded his father as chancellor of Oxford University, he named John Conant as vice-chancellor, on 9 October 1657. Prior to this the bursars' accounts of Jesus College show him handling payments to the university by 1654. While vice-chancellor, Conant restored many traditions, such as the wearing of caps and hoods, which his predecessor John Owen had considered popish. He went to London in 1659 with Seth Ward and John Wilkins to help thwart the grant of a university charter to Durham College. He sought to enforce discipline in the whole university, just as he had in Exeter College. In 1659 he was instrumental in procuring the enormous library of John Selden for the Bodleian. On 8 June 1676, he was appointed archdeacon of Norwich.

Described by his contemporaries as thin and short in stature, Conant became completely blind in 1686. He died on 12 March 1694 and was buried in the rebuilt All Saints' Church, Northampton, where he is commemorated by a monument and Latin epitaph.

== Sources ==
- Dictionary of National Biography

Academic offices
Preceded by George Hakewill	Rector of Exeter College, Oxford; 1649–1662	Succeeded by Joseph Maynard
Preceded by Joshua Hoyle	Regius Professor of Divinity at Oxford; 1654—1660	Succeeded by Robert Sanderson
Preceded by John Owen	Vice-Chancellor of Oxford University; 1657–1660	Succeeded by Paul Hood
