= Richard Mayo (minister) =

English nonconformist minister

Richard Mayo (Mayow) (1631?-1695) was an English nonconformist minister who after ejection in 1662 from his living ran a separatist congregation. He was the biographer of Edmund Staunton.

== Life ==
He was born about 1631. His family seems to have belonged to Hertfordshire. In early life he was at school in London under the Puritan John Singleton, and he entered the ministry when very young. During the Interregnum he obtained the vicarage of Kingston upon Thames, Surrey, as a successor to Edmund Staunton. For several years he also conducted a weekly lecture at St. Mary's, Whitechapel, London.

After the Act of Uniformity 1662 he was ejected from his living, but continued to preach in conventicles. He was one of the few who, in 1666, took the oath which exempted from the operation of the Five Mile Act. Towards the end of the reign of Charles II he settled as minister of a presbyterian congregation meeting at Buckingham House, College Hill, Upper Thames Street. After the Toleration Act (1689) his congregation moved to a newly built meeting-house in Salters' Hall Court, Cannon Street. Here in 1694, after the exclusion of Daniel Williams, from the merchants' lectureship, a new lectureship was established (see John Howe). Mayo was one of the lecturers.

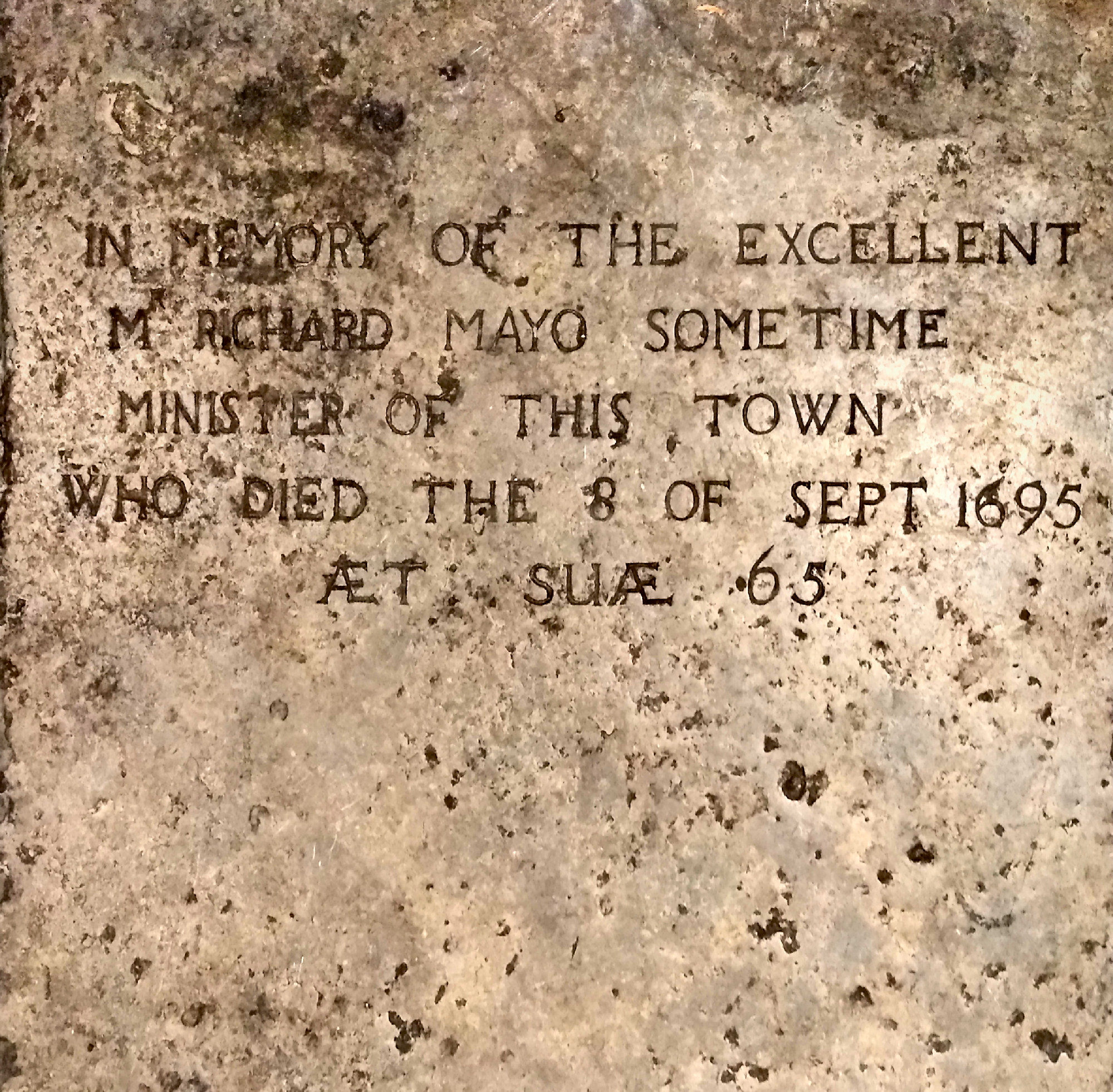
All Saints Church, Kingston

He died, after six weeks' illness, on Sunday, 8 September 1695, aged 64. Nathaniel Taylor, his assistant, preached his funeral sermon. He left two sons, Richard Mayo, D.D., who in 1708 was minister of St. Thomas's Hospital, Southwark, and afterwards rector of St. Michael's, Crooked Lane; and Daniel Mayo, who became better known as a minister.

== Works ==
He published: The Life ... of ... Edmund Staunton, (1673) and religious and theological works. He was responsible for the notes on the Epistle to the Romans in Annotations upon the Holy Bible, vol. ii. 1685, by Matthew Poole.
