= Thomas Hoy (poet) =

English physician and poet

Thomas Hoy (1659–1718) was an English physician and poet.

== Life ==
Born on 12 December 1659, he was the son of Clement Hoy of London. He was admitted to Merchant Taylors' School in 1672, and was elected a probationary fellow of St John's College, Oxford, in 1675. He graduated B.A. 1680, M.A. 1684, M.B. 1686, and M.D. 1689.

He was appointed Regius Professor of Physic at Oxford in 1698. Thomas Hearne, whose opinion of low church whig is not likely to be impartial, says that he owed his appointment to the influence of Dr. Gibbons with Lord Somers, and that he scandalously neglected the duties of his office. According to Anthony Wood he practised as a physician 'in and near the antient Borough of Warwick,' but in 1698 John Evelyn, writing from Wotton, speaks of Hoy as "a very learned, curious, and ingenious person, and our neighbour in Surrey". He was elected a Fellow of the Royal Society in December 1697.

He died, it is said, in Jamaica in or about 1718.

== Works ==
Besides contributing to the translations of Plutarch's Moralia, 1684, of Cornelius Nepos, 1684, and of Suetonius's Life of Tiberius, 1689, he published:

- Two essays, 'Ovid de arte Amandi, or the Art of Love,' book i., and 'Hero and Leander of Musæus from the Greek,' London, 1682.
- 'Agathocles, the Sicilian Usurper;' a poem, London, 1683.
