= Thomas Yate =

Thomas Yate, D.D. (c.1604–1681), sometimes called Yates, was an Oxford college head.

Yate was educated at Brasenose College, Oxford. He held the living at Middleton Cheney; and was Principal of Brasenose from 1660 until his death on 22 April 1681.

== Notes ==
Academic offices
Preceded by Daniel Greenwood	Principal of Brasenose College, Oxford; 1660–1681	Succeeded by John Meare
