= William Denton (physician) =

English physician and political writer

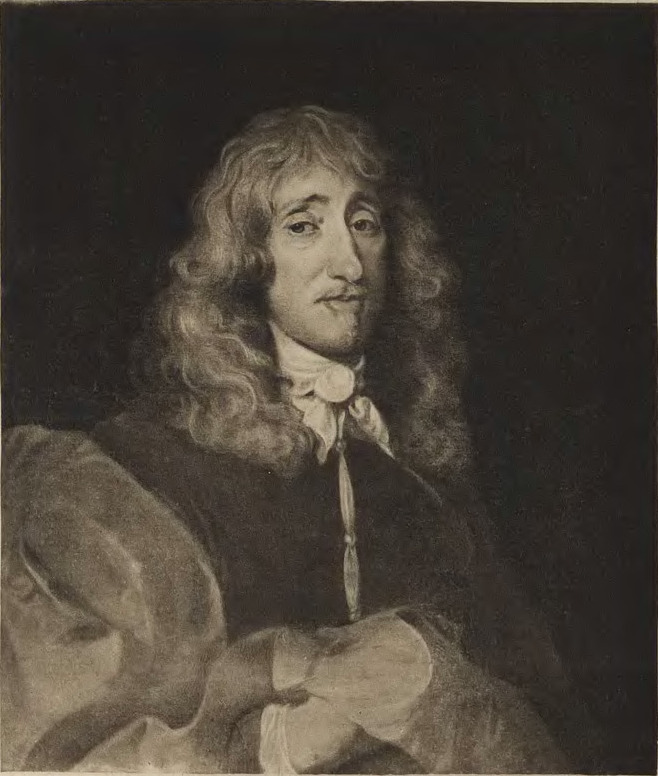
- Born: April 1605; Stow
- Died: 9 May 1691 (aged 86); London
- Occupations: Physician and political writer

William Denton (1605 – 9 May 1691) was an English physician and political writer.

== Biography ==
Denton was the youngest son of Sir Thomas Denton of Hillesden, Buckinghamshire. He was born at Stow in April 1605. He was educated at Magdalen Hall, Oxford, of which he became a commoner in 1621, and was initiated into the practice of medicine by a noted physician, Dr. Henry Ashworth. At the age of twenty-nine he took his degree as doctor, and two years later was appointed physician to Charles I, whom he attended to Scotland in the expedition of 1639. During the Commonwealth he continued his medical practice in London and Westminster.

On the restoration of Charles II the king appointed Denton physician in ordinary to the royal household. Soon afterwards he was admitted a fellow of the College of Physicians. He lived into the reign of William and Mary, and to the latter he dedicated his book, ‘Jus Regiminis.’ His published writings show him to have been a very ardent Protestant, but they are not in any way connected with his profession. He is often mentioned by Wiseman in his ‘Chirurgical Treatises,’ and always with respect. His nephew, Sir George Wheler, knt., writes of him as ‘an ingenious and facetious [phasesious] man, and for his polite conversation among the court ladies of King Charles I he was called Speaker of the Parliament of Women’ (Genealogist, 1886, p. 47).

He died on 9 May 1691 at his house in Covent Garden, London, and was buried at Hillesden. A monumental inscription in the church declared that he married Catherine, daughter of Bostock Fuller of Tandridge Court, and that their only child, Anne, married George, son of Sir Edward Nicholas, principal secretary of state to Charles I and Charles II.

He was the author of:

- ‘Horæ Subsecivæ; or, a Treatise shewing the Original Grounds, Reasons, and Provocations necessitating Sanguinary Laws against Papists made in the days of Queen Elizabeth,’ &c., London, 1664, 4to.
- ‘The Burnt Child dreads the Fire; or, an Examination of the Merits of the Papists relating to England, mostly from their own Pens, in Justification of the late Act of Parliament for preventing Dangers which may happen from Popish Recusants,’ London, 1675, 4to.
- ‘Jus Cæsaris et Ecclesiæ vere dictæ; or, a Treatise wherein Independency, Presbytery, &c., are discoursed,’ &c., London, 1681, folio. In the preface of this odd and rambling work the author mentions R. P., J. S., and P. W. to have written against his two former books. ‘But,’ says Wood, ‘whether either of those three was T. Blount of the Inner Temple, who answered one of them in a little treatise of one sheet [‘An Apology for the Liberty of the Press’], I cannot tell.’
- ‘Nil Dictum quod non dictum prius. The Case of the Government of England established by Law, impartially stated and faithfully collected from the best Historians, Precedents of former Ages, and Authorities of Records,’ London, 1681, 8vo.
- ‘Jus Regiminis: Being a Justification of Defensive Arms in general,’ &c., London, 1689, fol.
- ‘Some Remarks recommended unto Ecclesiastics of all Perswasions,’ London, fol. He also translated from Italian into English ‘A Treatise of Matters Beneficiary,’ London, 1680, fol., generally thought to have been written by F. Paolo Sarpi.
