= Paul Hood (academic administrator) =

English academic administrator

Paul Hood D.D. (died 2 August 1668) was an English academic administrator at the University of Oxford.

Hood was elected Rector (head) of Lincoln College, Oxford in 1621, a post he held until 1668. The Rector's Lodgings at Lincoln College were enlarged for Hood since he was the first Rector at the college to marry.

Paul Hood was a Puritan sympathiser. After the surrender of Oxford on 24 June 1646 during the English Civil War, Oxford University underwent a parliamentary visitation, starting from 15 May 1647. The visitation was resisted by many at Oxford, but not by Hood. He was the only Head of a College at Oxford to submit to the visitors when members of Convocation were asked to do so on 7 April 1648. Despite complying, however, Lincoln College had lost all its old fellows by 1650 under the Commonwealth of England. With the restoration of King Charles II to the throne in 1660, he was made Vice-Chancellor of Oxford University from 1661 until 1662 since he was the only Head of a College recognized as being valid by a Royal Commission. Hood died on 2 August 1668.

Academic offices
Preceded by Richard Kilby	Rector of Lincoln College, Oxford; 1621–1668	Succeeded by Nathaniel Crew
Preceded by John Conant	Vice-Chancellor of Oxford University; 1660–1661	Succeeded by Richard Baylie
