= Regius Professor of Medicine (Oxford) =

Professorship at the University of Oxford

The Regius Professor of Medicine is an appointment held at the University of Oxford. The chair was founded by Henry VIII of England by 1546, and until the 20th century the title was Regius Professor of Physic. Henry VIII established five Regius Professorships in the University, the others being the Regius chairs of Divinity, Civil Law, Hebrew and Greek. The Regius Professor of Clinical Medicine is always a member of Christ Church.

== Holders ==
- 1546–1554 John Warner
- 1554–1561 Thomas Frauncis (or Frances/Francis) (c.1519–1574)
- 1561–1582 Walter Bayley (1529–1593)
- 1582–1597 Anthony Aylworth (d.1619)
- 1597–1612 Bartholomew Warner (1556–1619)
- 1612–1647 Thomas Clayton the Elder (1575–1647), first Master of Pembroke
- 1647–1665 Sir Thomas Clayton the Younger (c. 1611–1693), Warden of Merton
- 1665–1681 James Hyde (1618–1681)
- 1681–1698 John Luffe (1647–1698)
- 1698–1718 Thomas Hoy (b.1659, d. in or after 1721)
- 1718–1729 Joshua Lasher
- 1729–1730 William Beauvoir
- 1730–1758 William Woodforde
- 1759–1772 John Kelly
- 1772–1801 William Vivian
- 1801–1822 Sir Christopher Pegge
- 1822–1851 John Kidd
- 1851–1857 James Adey Ogle
- 1858–1894 Sir Henry Wentworth Acland
- 1895–1904 Sir John Scott Burdon-Sanderson
- 1905–1919 Sir William Osler
- 1920–1927 Sir Archibald Garrod
- 1928–1943 Sir Edward Farquhar Buzzard
- 1943–1948 Sir Arthur William Mickle Ellis
- 1948–1954 Arthur Duncan Gardner
- 1956–1968 Sir George Pickering
- 1969–1979 Sir Richard Doll
- 1979–1992 Sir Henry Harris
- 1992–2000 Sir David J. Weatherall
- 2002–2024 Sir John Irving Bell
- 2026- Menna Clatworthy

== See also ==
- Regius Professor of Medicine (Aberdeen)
- Regius Professor of Physic (Cambridge)
- Regius Professor of Medicine (Dublin)
- Regius Professor of Medicine and Therapeutics, Glasgow
