= John Fell (bishop) =

English churchman and influential academic (1625–1686)

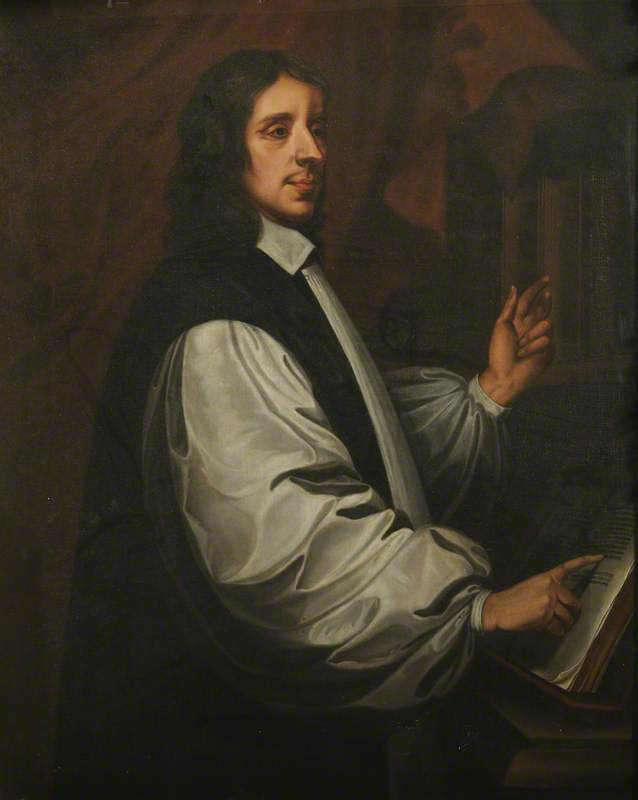
John Fell, Bishop of Oxford

John Fell (23 June 1625 – 10 July 1686) was an English churchman and influential academic. He served as Dean of Christ Church, Oxford, and later concomitantly as Bishop of Oxford.

== Education ==
Fell was born at Longworth, Berkshire (now Oxfordshire), the eldest son of Samuel Fell and his wife, Margaret (née Wylde). Samuel Fell was also Dean of Christ Church, from 1638 until 1648. John Fell received his early education at Lord Williams's School at Thame in Oxfordshire. In 1637 at age 11 he became a student at Christ Church, and in 1640 because of his "known desert", he was specially allowed by the Archbishop of Canterbury, William Laud, to proceed to his degree of BA when lacking one term's residence. He obtained his MA in 1643 and took Holy Orders (deacon 1647, priest 1649).

== English Civil War ==
During the Civil War he bore arms for King Charles I of England and held a commission as ensign. In 1648 he was deprived of his studentship by the parliamentary visitors, and during the next few years he resided chiefly at Oxford with his brother-in-law, Thomas Willis, at whose house opposite Merton College he and his friends Richard Allestree and John Dolben maintained an Anglican presence in Oxford throughout the Commonwealth.

== Career ==
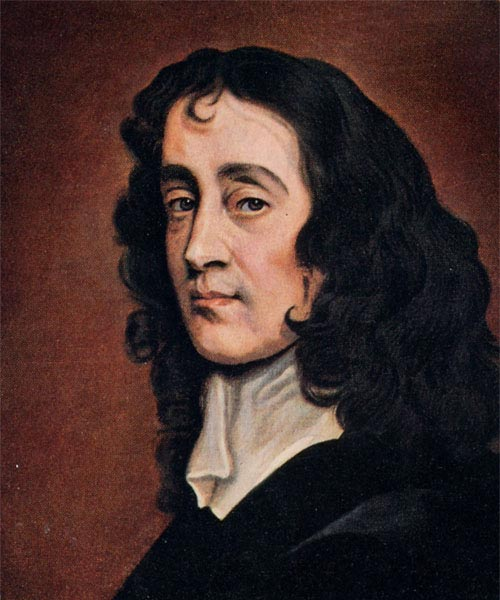
John Fell.

After the Restoration, Fell was made prebendary of Chichester, canon of Christ Church (27 July 1660), dean (30 November), master of St Oswald's hospital, Worcester, chaplain to the king, and D.D. He filled the office of Vice-Chancellor of the University of Oxford from 1666 to 1669, and was consecrated Bishop of Oxford, in 1676, retaining his deanery in commendam. Some years later, he declined the Primacy of Ireland.

Fell showed himself a capable administrator. He restored good order in the university by the archbishop, which during the Commonwealth had given place to a general disregard of authority. He ejected the intruders from his college or else "fixed them in loyal principles." "He was the most zealous man of his time for the Church of England," says Anthony Wood, "and none that I yet know of did go beyond him in the performance of the rules belonging thereunto." He attended chapel four times a day, restored to the services, not without some opposition, the organ and surplice, and insisted on the proper academic dress which had fallen into disuse. He was active in recovering church property, and by his directions a children's catechism was drawn up by Thomas Marshall for use in his diocese. "As he was among the first of our clergy," says Thomas Burnet, "that apprehended the design of bringing in popery, so he was one of the most zealous against it."

He made many converts from the Roman Catholics and Nonconformists. On the other hand, he successfully opposed the incorporation of Titus Oates as D.D. in the university in October 1679; and according to the testimony of William Nichols, his secretary, he disapproved of the Exclusion Bill. He excluded the undergraduates, whose presence had been irregularly permitted, from convocation. He obliged students to attend lectures, instituted reforms in the performances of the public exercises in the schools, kept the examiners up to their duties, was present in person at examinations. He encouraged the students to act plays. He entirely suppressed "coursing," i.e. disputations in which the rival parties "ran down opponents in arguments," and which commonly ended in blows and disturbances.

=== Discipline ===
He was a disciplinarian, and possessed a talent for the education of young men, many of whom he received into his own family. Tom Brown, author of The Dialogues of the Dead, about to be expelled from Oxford for some offence, was pardoned by Fell on the condition of his translating ex tempore the 32nd epigram of Martial, book 1:

Non amo te, Sabidi, nec possum dicere quare:
Hoc tantum possum dicere, non amo te.

To which he immediately replied with the well-known lines:

I do not like thee, Doctor Fell,
The reason why I cannot tell;
But this I know, and know full well,
I do not like thee, Dr Fell.

Delinquents were not always treated thus mildly by Fell, and Acton Cremer, for the crime of courting a wife while only a bachelor of arts, was punished by having to translate into English the whole of Scheffer's history of Lapland. As Vice-Chancellor, Fell personally visited the drinking taverns and ordered out the students. In the university elections he showed great energy in suppressing corruption.

=== Building operations ===
Fell's building operations were ambitious. In his own college he completed in 1665 the north side of Cardinal Thomas Wolsey's great quadrangle, already begun by his father but abandoned during the Commonwealth; in 1672, he rebuilt the east side of the Chaplain's quadrangle "with a straight passage under it leading from the cloister into the field," occupied now by the new Meadow Buildings; the lodgings of the canon of the third stall in the passage uniting the Tom Quad and Peckwater Quadrangle (c.1674); a long building joining the Chaplain's quadrangle on the east side in 1677–1678; and lastly the great Tom Tower gate, begun in June 1681 on the foundation laid by Wolsey and finished in November 1682, to which the bell "great Tom," after being recast, was transferred from the cathedral in 1683. In 1670 he planted and laid out the Broad Walk.

He spent large sums of his own on these works, gave £500 for the restoration of Banbury church, erected a church at St Oswald's, Worcester, and the parsonage house at Woodstock at his own expense, and rebuilt Cuddesdon Palace. Fell disapproved of the use of the University Church of St Mary the Virgin for secular purposes, and promoted the building of the Sheldonian Theatre by Archbishop Gilbert Sheldon. He was treasurer during its construction, presided at the formal opening on 9 July 1669, and was nominated curator, along with Christopher Wren, in July 1670.

=== Oxford University Press ===
In the theatre was placed the Oxford University Press, the establishment of which had been a favourite project of Laud and now engaged a large share of Fell's energy and attention, and which as curator he practically controlled. "Were it not you ken Mr Dean extraordinarily well," wrote Sir Leoline Jenkins to John Williamson in 1672, "it were impossible to imagine how assiduous and drudging he is about his press." He sent for type and printers from Holland, declaring that "the foundation of all success must be laid in doing things well, which l am sure will not be done with English letters."

=== Writings ===
Many works, including a Bible, editions of the classics and of the early fathers, were produced under Fell's direction and editing. He published annually one work, generally a classical author annotated by himself, which he distributed to all the students of his college on New Year's Day. On one occasion he surprised the Press while they were surreptitiously printing Pietro Aretino's Postures, and he seized and destroyed the plates and impressions. Ever "an eager defender and maintainer of the university and its privileges", he was hostile to the Royal Society, which he regarded as a possible rival, and in 1686 he gave an absolute refusal to Obadiah Walker, afterwards the Roman Catholic master of University College, though licensed by James II, to print books, declaring he would as soon "part with his bed from under him" as his press. He conducted it on strict business principles, and to the criticism that more great works were not produced replied that they would not sell. He was, however, not free from fads, and his new spelling (of which one feature was the substitution of i for y in such words as eies, daies, maiest) met with great disapproval.

Fell also wrote lives of his friends Henry Hammond (1661), Richard Allestree, prefixed to his edition of the latter's sermons (1684), and Thomas Willis, in Latin. His seasonable advice to Protestants showing the necessity of maintaining the Established Religion in opposition to Popery was published in 1688. Some of his sermons, which John Evelyn found dull, were printed, including Character of the Last Daies, preached before the king, 1675, and a sermon preached before the House of Peers on 22 December 1680. The Interest of England stated (1659), advocating the restoration of the king, and The Vanity of Scoffing (1674), are also attributed to him. Fell probably had some share in the composition of The Whole Duty of Man, and in the subsequent works published under the name of the author of The Whole Duty, which included Reasons of the Decay of Christian Piety, The Ladies' Calling, The Gentleman's Calling, The Government of the Tongue, The Art of Contentment, and The Lively Oracles given us, all of which were published in one volume with notes and a preface by Fell in 1684.

=== Linguist and translator ===
He had a high reputation as a Hellenist, a Latinist and a philologist, and he brought out with the collaboration of others his edition of St Cyprian in 1682, an English translation of The Unity of the Church in 1681, editions of Nemesius of Emesa (1671), of Aratus and of Eratosthenes (1672), Theocritus (1676), Alcinous on Plato (1677), St Clement's Epistles to the Corinthians (1677), Athenagoras (1682), Clemens Alexandrinus (1683), Theophilus of Antioch (1684), Grammatica rationis sive institutiones logicae (1673 and 1685), and a critical edition of the New Testament in 1675. The first volumes of Rerum Anglicarum scriptores and of Historiae Britannicae, etc. were compiled under his patronage in 1684. Manuscripts of Saint Augustine were placed in the Bodleian at his behest; while other libraries at Oxford generously collated a catalogue for the use of the Benedictines at Paris, who were then preparing a new edition of the father.

=== Mission to India ===
Occasionally imprudent in his schemes, he was the originator of a mission to India which was taken up by the British East India Company. He undertook to train as missionaries four scholars at Oxford, procured a set of Arabic types, and issued from these the Gospels and Acts in the Malay language in 1677. This was unsuccessful, and the mission collapsed.

=== Controversy ===
Having undertaken at his own charge to publish a Latin version of Wood's History and Antiquities of the University of Oxford, with the object of presenting the history of the university in a manner worthy of the great subject to European readers, and of extending its fame abroad, he arrogated to himself the right of editing the work. "He would correct, alter, dash out what he pleased... He was a great man and carried all things at his pleasure." In particular he struck out all the passages which Wood had inserted in praise of Thomas Hobbes, and substituted some disparaging epithets. He called Leviathan "monstrosissimus" and "publico damno notissimus." To the printed remonstrance of Hobbes, Fell inserted an insulting reply in the History to "irritabile illud et vanissimum Malmesburiense animal," and to the complaint of Wood at this usage answered only that Hobbes "was an old man, had one foot in the grave; that he should mind his latter end, and not trouble the world any more with his papers." In small things as in great he loved to rule and direct. "Let not Fell," writes R. South to Ralph Bathurst, "have the fingering and altering of them, for I think that, barring the want of siquidems and quinetiams, they are as good as his Worship can make." Wood styled him "a valde vult person."

Not content with ruling his own college, he desired to govern the whole university. He prevented Gilbert Ironside, who "was not pliable to his humour," from holding the office of Vice-Chancellor. He "endeavoured to carry all things by a high hand; scorn'd in the least to court the Masters when he had to have anything pass'd the convocation. Severe to other colleges, blind as to his own, very partiall and with good words, and flatterers and tell-tales could get anything out of him." According to Bishop Gilbert Burnet, who praises his character and administration, Fell was "a little too much heated in the matter of our disputes with the dissenters...He had much zeal for reforming abuses, and managed it perhaps with too much heat and in too peremptory a way...But we have so little of that among us that no wonder if such men are censured by those who love not such patterns nor such severe task-masters." And Anthony Wood, after declaring that Fell "was exceeding partial in his government even to corruption; went thro' thick and thin; grasped at all yet did nothing perfect or effectually; cared not what people said of him, was in many things very rude and in most pedantic and pedagogical," concluded that he "yet still aimed at the public good." Roger North, who paid Fell a visit at Oxford, wrote of him in terms of enthusiasm: "The great Dr Fell, who was truly great in all his circumstances, capacities, undertakings and learning, and above all for his superabundant public spirit and goodwill ... O the felicity of that age and place when his authority swayed!"

In November 1684, at the command of King Charles II, Fell deprived John Locke, who had incurred the royal displeasure by his friendship with Anthony Ashley-Cooper, 1st Earl of Shaftesbury, and was suspected as the author of certain seditious pamphlets, of his studentship at Christ Church, summarily and without hearing his defence. Fell had in former years cultivated Locke's friendship, had kept up a correspondence with him, and in 1663 had written a testimonial in his favour; and the ready compliance of one who could on occasion offer a stout resistance to any invasion of the privileges of the university has been severely criticised. It must, however, be remembered in extenuation that the legal status of a person on the foundation of a collegiate body had not then been decided in the law-courts. He afterwards expressed his regret.

== Death ==
Fell, who had never married, died "worn out", according to Wood, at the age of 61. He was buried in the divinity chapel in the cathedral, below the seat which he had so often occupied when living, where a monument and an epitaph, now moved elsewhere, were placed to his memory. "His death," writes John Evelyn, "was an extraordinary losse to the poore church at this time". With all his faults Fell was a great man, "the greatest governor," estimated Speaker Onslow, "that has ever been since his time in either of the universities," and of his own college, to which he left several exhibitions for the maintenance of poor scholars, he was a second founder.

A sum of money was left by John Cross to perpetuate Fell's memory by an annual speech in his praise, but the Felii laudes were discontinued in 1866. There are two interesting pictures of Fell at Christ Church, one where he is represented with his two friends Allestree and Dolben, and another by Anthony van Dyck. The statue placed on the northeast angle of the Great Quadrangle bears no likeness to the bishop, who is described by Hearne as a "thin grave man."

== See also ==
- Thomas Hearne

== Sources ==
- Salter, H. E.; Lobel, Mary D. (1954). "Christ Church: A History of the County of Oxford". Victoria County History. 3: The University of Oxford.
- Anthony Wood, Athenae Oxonienses and Fasti (ed. Bliss)
- Antony a Wood, Life and Times, ed. by A. Clark
- Gilbert Burnet, History of His Own Time, ed. 1833
- J. Welch, Alumni Westmonasterienses

Academic offices
Preceded by George Morley	Dean of Christ Church, Oxford; 1660–1686	Succeeded by John Massey
Preceded by Robert Say	Vice-Chancellor of Oxford University; 1666–1669	Succeeded by Peter Mews
Church of England titles
Preceded by Henry Compton	Bishop of Oxford; 1676–1686	Succeeded by Samuel Parker
