= Edward Reynolds =

Bishop of Norwich

The Right Reverend Edward Reynolds
- Bishop of Norwich
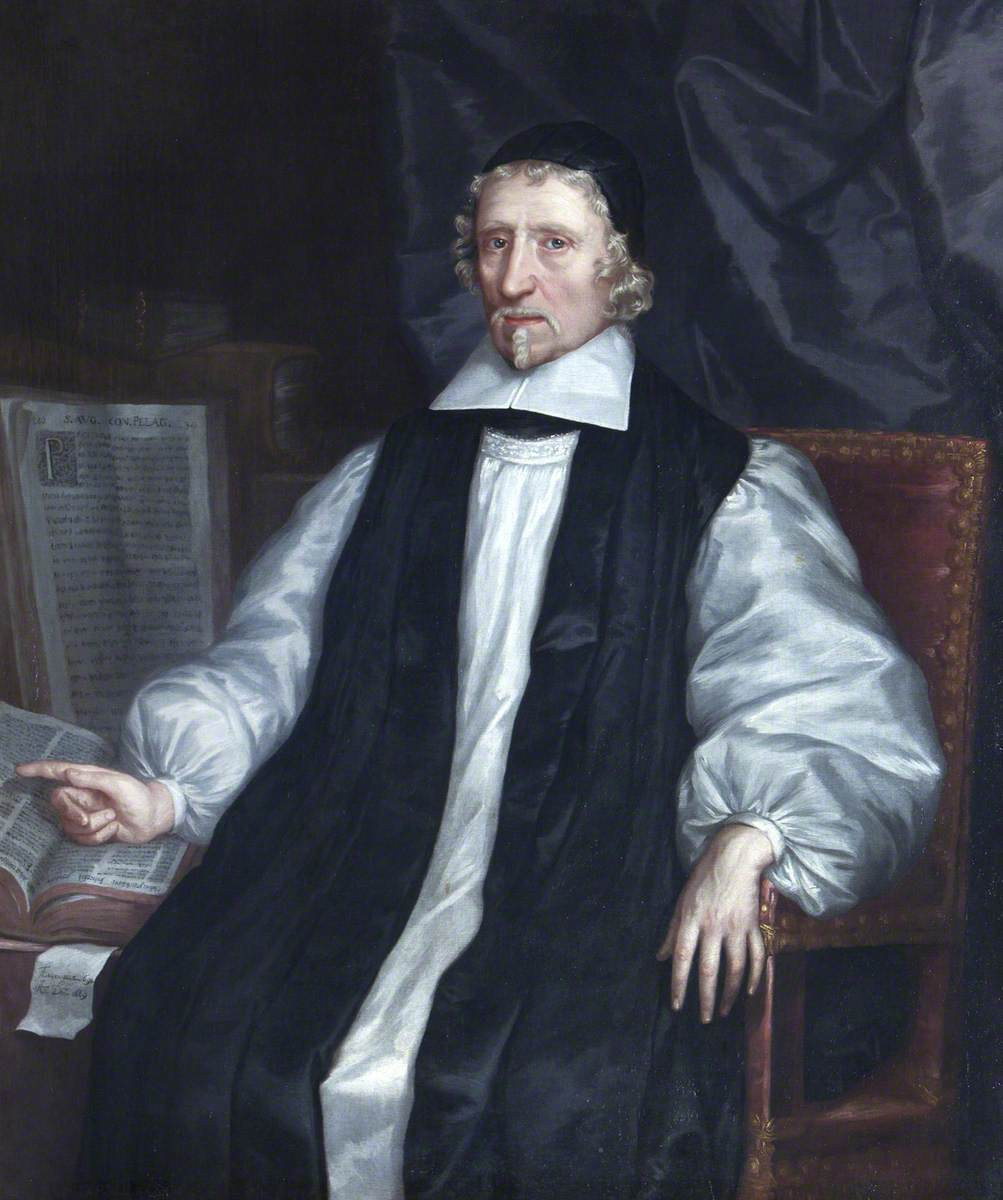
- Church: Church of England
- See: Norwich
- In office: 1660–1676
- Previous post: Bishop

Orders
- Consecration: 6 January 1661 by Gilbert Sheldon

Personal details
- Born: November 1599 Southampton
- Died: 28 July 1676 (aged 76)

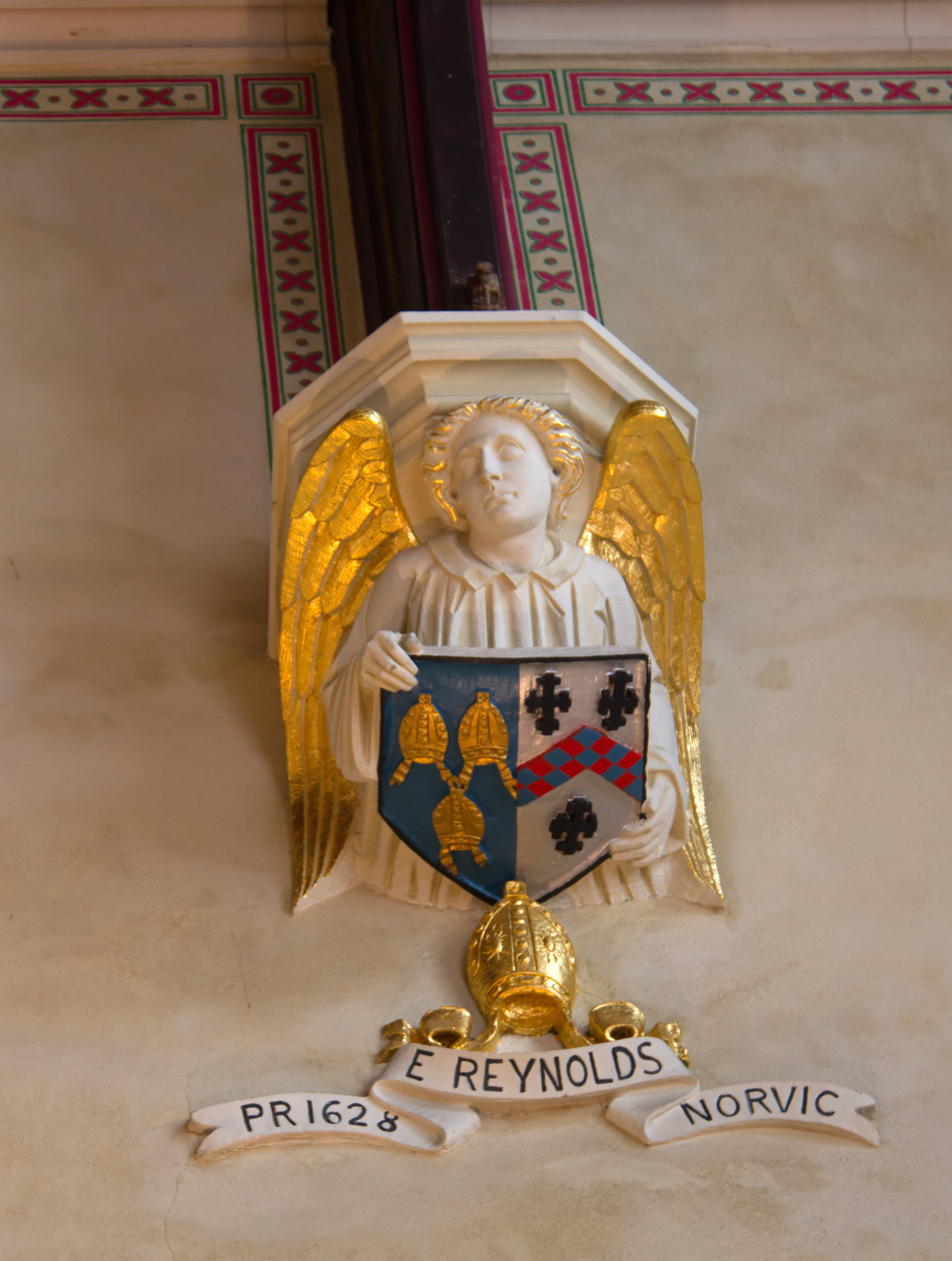
Arms of Edward Reynolds, Bishop of Norwich: See of Norwich (Azure, three mitres labelled or) impaling Reynolds (Argent, a chevron chequy gules and azure between three cross-crosslets sable). Lincoln's Inn Chapel, where he served as Preacher

Edward Reynolds (November 1599 – 28 July 1676) was a bishop of Norwich in the Church of England and an author. He was born in Holyrood parish in Southampton, the son of Augustine (Austin) Reynolds, one of the customers of the city, and his wife, Bridget.

== Career ==
In 1615, Reynolds became postmaster of Merton College and in 1620, probationer fellow. In 1622 he was appointed Preacher at Lincoln's Inn (where he is memorialised by his arms sculpted on a corbel supporting the roof of a Hall) from 1627 to 1628 served as the thirty-seventh vicar of All Saints' Church, Northampton, and in 1631 rector of Braunston, also in Northamptonshire; but with the outbreak of the English Civil War in 1642, he sided with the Presbyterians. In 1643 he was one of the Westminster Assembly divines, and took the covenant in 1644. In 1648 he became dean of Christ Church, Oxford and vice-chancellor of the University of Oxford. He refused the engagement (1651) and despite his promise of obedience to the law, but not subscription to the oath in Humble Proposals of Sundry Learned and Pious Divines (1649), this was insufficient to save him; he lost the vice-chancellorship in September 1650. He was ejected from his deanery the following March, despite a last minute pledge to subscribe in a limited sense. He preached before parliament in January 1657, and the same year he became vicar of St Lawrence Jewry, London, but was restored to his deanery in 1659.

After the death of Oliver Cromwell, he and other presbyterians sought an accommodation with Richard Cromwell, and on 11 October 1658, on behalf of himself and other London presbyterian ministers, Reynolds delivered an oral address to the new protector. In 1659 he preached at the opening session of parliament, and his sermons to parliament and London notables throughout 1659 and 1660 became increasingly pointed about the need for peace, unity, and moderation, codes for the restoration of the monarchy and a moderate episcopacy.

== After the Restoration ==
At the Restoration in 1660, he was made chaplain to Charles II. In the same year he was elected warden of Merton College, Oxford, and made bishop of Norwich. He was elected to the See on 28 November 1660, confirmed 24 December, and consecrated a bishop on 13 January 1661. His contribution to the Book of Common Prayer is The General Thanksgiving prayer which is part of the office of Morning Prayer. His collected works were published in 1658, again in 1679 and, with a memoir of his life by Alexander Chambers, in 1826.

== Later years and death ==
In his later years Reynolds was severely affected by the stone and strangury, and he died on 28 July 1676 at his bishop's palace. He was buried on 9 August in the bishop's chapel he had newly built at Norwich. He was survived by his wife Mary. Their daughter Elizabeth married John Conant.

== Works ==
- An explication of the hundred and tenth Psalm (1837 printing)
  - https://archive.org/details/explicationofhun00reyn
- An explication of the hundred and tenth Psalm : wherein the several heads of Christian religion therein contained, touching the exaltation of Christ, the scepter of his kingdom, the character of his subjects, his priesthood, victories, sufferings, and resurrection, are largely explained and applied : being the substance of several sermons preached at Lincolns Inne (1642)
  - https://archive.org/details/anexplication00reynuoft
- A treatise of the passions and faculties of the soule of man : with the severall dignities and corruptions thereunto belonging (1640)
  - https://archive.org/details/passio00reyn
- The Whole Works of the Right Rev. Edward Reynolds, Lord Bishop of Norwich (vol 1) (1826)
  - https://archive.org/details/wholeworksright00chalgoog
- The whole works of ... Edward Reynolds, now first collected [by J.R. Pitman] (vol 2) (1826)
  - https://archive.org/details/wholeworksedwar01reyngoog
- The whole works of ... Edward Reynolds, now first collected [by J.R. Pitman] (vol 3) (1826)
  - https://archive.org/details/wholeworksedwar02reyngoog
- The whole works of ... Edward Reynolds, now first collected [by J.R. Pitman] (vol 4)
- The whole works of ... Edward Reynolds, now first collected [by J.R. Pitman] (vol 5) (1826)
  - https://archive.org/details/wholeworksedwar00reyngoog
- The whole works of ... Edward Reynolds, now first collected [by J.R. Pitman] (vol 6)
- An humble exhortation to the ... House of commons ... Taken out of a sermon (1711)
  - https://archive.org/details/anhumbleexhorta00reyngoog

Academic offices
Preceded by Samuel Fell	Dean of Christ Church, Oxford; 1648–1651	Succeeded by John Owen
Preceded by John Owen	Dean of Christ Church, Oxford; 1660	Succeeded by George Morley
Preceded by Jonathan Goddard	Warden of Merton College, Oxford; 1660–1661	Succeeded by Thomas Clayton
Church of England titles
Preceded by Joseph Hall	Bishop of Norwich; 1660–1676	Succeeded by Antony Sparrow
