= Thomas Clayton (physician) =

English physician and politician

Sir Thomas Clayton (c 1612 – 4 October 1693), known in his father's lifetime as Thomas Clayton the Younger, was an English physician and professor of medicine who sat in the House of Commons in 1660.

Clayton was the son of Thomas Clayton, MD of Oxford, the last Principal of Broadgates Hall, and the first Master of Pembroke College. He enrolled there on 25 May 1627, aged fifteen, and graduated BA on 22 January 1629, MA on 17 October 1631. He was of Gray's Inn in 1633. Further awards from Oxford were a B.Med. on 18 July 1635 and a D.Med. on 19 June 1639. He was Regius Professor of Medicine at Oxford from 1647 to 1665, succeeding his father.

In 1660, Clayton was elected one of the two Members of Parliament for Oxford University in the Convention Parliament. He was knighted on 27 March 1661. From 1661 to 1693, he was a warden at Merton College, Oxford.

Clayton was of La Vache, Buckinghamshire. He died at the age of 80.
