= George Hakewill =

English clergyman and author

- George Hakewill, contemporary portrait, collection of Exeter College, Oxford
- Born: 1578; Barnstaple, Devon, England
- Died: 5 April 1649 (aged 71); Heanton Punchardon, Barnstaple, Devon, England
- Resting place: 51.099953°N 4.140657°W
- Education: Exeter College Oxford
- Occupation: Divine
- Spouse: Mary Ayer or Ayers (née Delbridge)

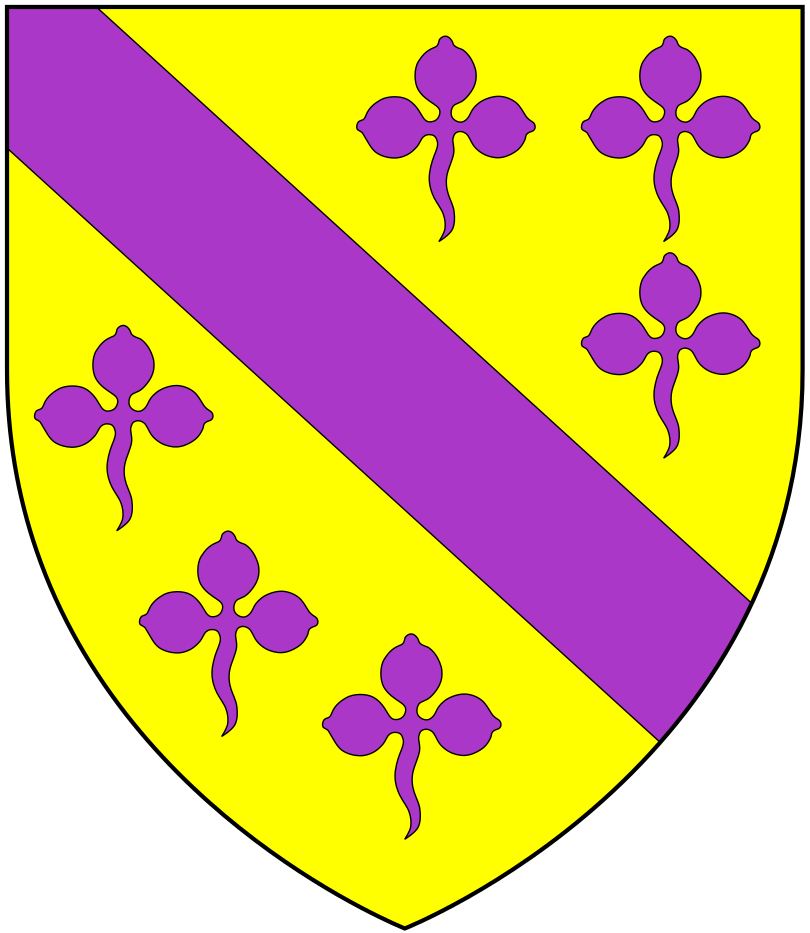
Arms of Hakewill: Or, a bend between six trefoils slipped purpure

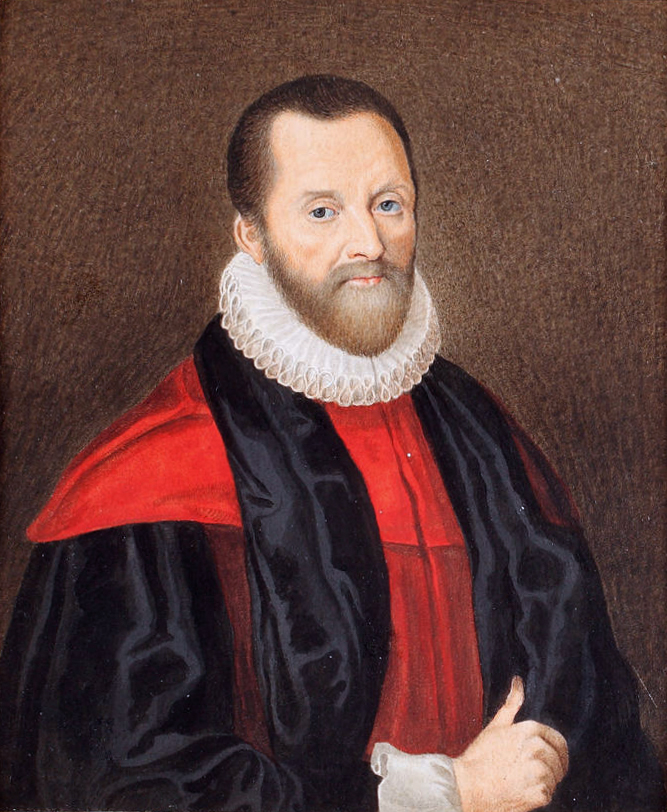
Late 18th century copy of an original portrait of George Hakewill by Sylvester Harding

George Hakewill (1578 or 1579 – 1649) was an English clergyman and author.

== Early life ==
Born in Exeter, he studied at Alban Hall, University of Oxford, where he was a noted disputant and orator and in June 1596, only a year after his matriculation and at the unusually early age of 18, he was elected a fellow of Exeter College. There he proceeded B.A. in 1599, and M.A. in 1602. In 1604 he obtained leave to travel and spent the next four years in Europe, mainly with Swiss and German Calvinists, spending a winter at the University of Heidelberg with David Pareas and Abraham Scultetus.

== Royal service ==
Of strongly anti-Catholic and pro-Calvinist religious views, Hakewill was one of the two clergymen appointed in 1612 to preserve Prince Charles "from the inroads of popery."

He wrote strongly in defense of the then Calvinist position of the Anglican Church.

In 1616, possibly by the prince's means, he had been appointed Archdeacon of Surrey and his further rise through the ranks of the church seemed assured. His decision however in 1622 to present the prince with a treatise written by himself and arguing against the ongoing negotiations for a Spanish match led to the abrupt end of his career at court. The treatise was shown to the prince's father, James I of England, who committed Hakewill to a prison for a brief period and appointed Lancelot Andrewes to rebut the tract.

== Later life ==
Despite this setback in 1624 Hakewill single-handedly paid for the building of Exeter College chapel (consecrated 15 October 1624), at a cost of £1200. (In his will he requested that his heart be buried there, though there is no evidence this was carried out.)

Hakewill was eventually made Rector of Exeter College (elected 23 August 1642; 18 admitted November 1642). He however "did little, or not at all, reside upon that rectory: For the civil wars breaking out, he returned to his parsonage... where he lived a retired life to the time of his death." The parsonage in question was the Rectory of Heanton Punchardon near Barnstaple in Devon, to which he had been presented by his kinsman Sir Robert Basset.

His works include: The Vanitie of the Eie. First Beganne for the Comfort of a Gentlewoman Bereaved of Her Sight and since upon Occasion Inlarged (second edition, 1608; third edition, 1615; and another impression, 1633); a Latin treatise against regicides (1612); and An Apologie of the Power and Providence of God in the Government of the World (1627). The latter work, a rebuttal of the view that creation, including humanity, was gradually declining, was praised by Samuel Pepys and is cited by James Boswell as one of the formative influences on the prose of Samuel Johnson. Hakewill's style has been described as "lively and forceful".

By a brief marriage to Mary Ayer or Ayers (née Delbridge) Hakewill had two sons, John and George. George appears to have died in childhood. After becoming a fellow of Exeter College, John also died within his father's lifetime in 1637. Hakewill's will shows that, despite his theological leanings towards radical Protestantism, he remained politically a royalist and loyal to the Church of England as established. He also left a bequest to his "dear brother" William Hakewill, a noted supporter of the opposing Parliamentarian party. He named his nephew John Hakewill executor of his will, proved 2 May 1649.

George Hakewill was buried in the chancel of his church in Heanton Punchardon on 5 April 1649.

== Works ==
A list of selected works by Hakewill follows:

- King Davids Vow for Reformation of Himselfe, His Family, His Kingdome. Deliuered in Twelue Sermons before the Prince His Highnesse vpon Psalm 101 (1621).
- An Apologie of the Power and Providence of God in the Government of the World (1627).

Academic offices
Preceded by John Prideaux	Rector of Exeter College, Oxford; 1642–1649	Succeeded by John Conant
