= Edmund Staunton =

English clergyman

Edmund Staunton (Stanton) (1600–1671) was an English clergyman, chosen by Parliament as President of Corpus Christi College, Oxford, and a member of the Westminster Assembly. Later he was a nonconformist minister.

== Life ==
A younger son of Francis (afterwards Sir Francis) Staunton, he was born at Woburn, Bedfordshire, on 20 October 1600. He matriculated from Wadham College, Oxford, on 9 June 1615, and on 4 October following was admitted scholar of Corpus Christi. While still an undergraduate, on 22 March 1617, he was transferred from the Bedfordshire scholarship to the Bedfordshire fellowship. After an illness and an escape from drowning, he had, about 1620, in his own words, "many sad and serious thoughts concerning my spiritual and eternal state."

On proceeding M.A. in 1623, he selected the ministry as his profession, and commenced his clerical life as afternoon lecturer at Witney, where he was acceptable to the parishioners, but not to the rector. He left Witney for the living of Bushey in Hertfordshire, which he shortly afterwards exchanged for Kingston upon Thames. There he remained for about twenty years, being known by the name of "the searching preacher". He preached and catechised, taught from house to house, and set up a weekly lecture, attracting eminent names. While at Kingston he proceeded B.D.and D.D. at Oxford in 1634. He was chosen to be not only one of the assembly of divines which met at Westminster in 1643, but also one of the six preachers in Westminster Abbey.

When Robert Newlyn was ejected from the presidency of Corpus by the "committee of Lords and Commons for Reformation of the University of Oxford" (22 May 1648), Staunton, a former fellow, was appointed in his place. The actual ejection of Newlyn and assumption of the office by Staunton did not take place till 11 July 1649. Staunton was disciplinarian, and evangelical, incurring the ridicule of some royalists.

On 15 June 1652 Staunton, who had submitted to the "engagement" required by Parliament, was nominated by the committee of parliament to be on the new board of visitors, which was limited to ten. On the third board, nominated by Oliver Cromwell, the Lord Protector, about two years afterwards, Staunton's name does not appear.

Staunton was, in his turn, ejected from the president's lodge on 3 August 1660, his predecessor, Newlyn, having already been reinstated in his office. Withdrawing from Oxford, he retired, in the first instance, to Rickmansworth in Hertfordshire, and he ministered in various parishes around. After the Act of Uniformity 1662 he was silenced, like other nonconformists, but he seems, after remaining at Rickmansworth about two years longer, to have lived in private families, and to have exercised his ministerial functions covertly and in defiance of the law. According to the Rev. Robert Watts, Staunton became pastor of a meeting-house at Salters' Hall, London, built for him. His last move was to Bovingdon, Hertfordshire, where, and at towns such as St. Albans, he preached to small groups. He died at Bovingdon on 14 July 1671, and was buried in the parish church.

== Works ==
A prolific and prominent preacher, Staunton wrote only a few sermons (one on Phinehas being to Parliament just before the attainder of William Laud) and two tracts, A Dialogue between a Minister and a Stranger about Soul Affairs, and A Treatise of Christian Conference. These were published at the end of Richard Mayo's biography in 1671.

== Notes ==
Academic offices
Preceded by Robert Newlyn	President of Corpus Christi College, Oxford; 1648-1660	Succeeded by Robert Newlyn
