= Thomas Clayton the Elder =

Regius Professor of Medicine in Oxford

Thomas Clayton (1575-1647) was the Regius Professor of Medicine in Oxford and the first Master of Pembroke College, Oxford.

He became the Regius professor in 1611, in succession to his father-in-law Anthony Aylworth (sometimes Aylward); the post subsequently was held by Clayton's son, also called Thomas Clayton.

In 1617 he became Master of Ewelme Hospital (now added to the post of Regious Professor), and in 1664 the Tomlin's Reader in Anatomy. He was the principal of Broadgates Hall when it was converted to a constituent college of the University of Oxford, hence becoming the first Master of Pembroke (Oxford).

The last years of his life and work were complicated by the English Civil War, in which he raised the University Legion in support of the king.
