= List of presidents of Corpus Christi College, Oxford =

The head of Corpus Christi College, University of Oxford, is the president. The current president is Helen Moore who was appointed in 2018.

== List of presidents of Corpus Christi College ==
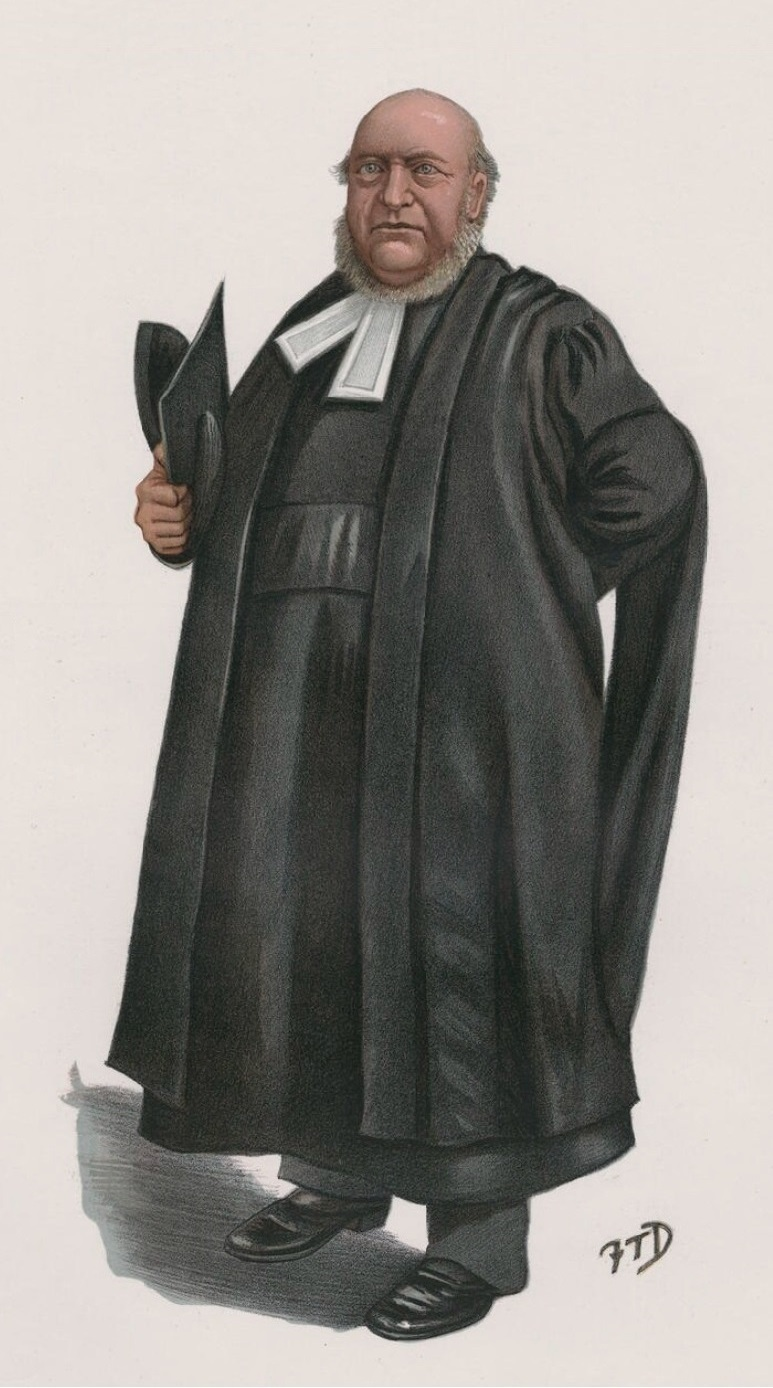
Caricature of Thomas Fowler, President of Corpus 1881–1904

Name	From	To	Notes
John Claymond	1517	1537	First President
Robert Morwent	1537	1558	
William Chedsey	1558	1559	Imprisoned in the Tower of London in 1560
William Butcher	1559	1561	
Thomas Greenway	1562	1568	
William Cole	1568	1598	
John Rainolds	1598	1607	Died in office
John Spenser	1607	1614	
Thomas Anyan	1614	1629	
John Holt	1629	1631	
Thomas Jackson	1631	1640	
Robert Newlyn	1640	1648	Expelled by the parliamentary visitation of Oxford
Edmund Staunton	1648	1660	Appointed by Parliament
Robert Newlyn	1660	1688	Previous president, returned after the purge and died in office
Thomas Turner	1688	1714	Died in office
Basil Kennett	1714	1715	Died in office
John Mather	1715	1748	
Thomas Randolph	1748	1783	Died in office
John Cooke	1783	1823	Died in office
Thomas Edward Bridges	1823	1843	
James Norris	1843	1872	
John Matthias Wilson	1872	1881	
Thomas Fowler	1881	1904	Died in office
Thomas Case	1904	1924	
Percy Stafford Allen	1924	1933	Died in office
Sir Richard Winn Livingstone	1933	1950	
W. F. R. Hardie	1950	1969	
Derek Hall	1969	1975	Died in office
Sir Kenneth Dover	1976	1986	
Sir Keith Thomas	1986	2000	
Sir Tim Lankester	2001	2010	
Richard Carwardine	2010	2016	
Sir Steven Cowley	2016	2018	
Helen Moore	2018	Present	
