= Huddesford =

Huddesford is a surname, and may refer to:

- George Huddesford (1749–1809), cleric, painter and satirical poet in Oxford
- George Huddesford (academic) (c.1699–1776), academic administrator and museum keeper at the University of Oxford
- William Huddesford (1732—1772), curator of the Ashmolean Museum from 1755 to 1772
