= Thomas Case (cricketer, born 1844) =

English cricketer, philosopher, and college president

Thomas Case (Liverpool, 14 July 1844 – Falmouth, 31 October 1925) was an English academic, philosopher, sportsman and author.

Case was educated at Rugby and Balliol. He was Fellow of Brasenose College, Oxford, from 1868 to 1870; Tutor at Balliol from 1870 to 1876; and on the staff of Corpus Christi College, Oxford, from then onwards. He was Waynflete Professor of Metaphysical Philosophy at Oxford from 1889 to 1910; and President of Corpus from 1904 to 1924.

Case was also a first-class cricketer (active 1864–1869) who played for Oxford University and Middlesex. He played in 35 first-class matches. He was a righthanded batsman who totalled 982 career runs with a highest score of 116. His sons, William and Thomas, were also first-class cricketers.

He married Elizabeth Donn (1848–1927), the daughter of composer William Sterndale Bennett and he was buried on 4 November in Wolvercote cemetery, near Oxford.

Academic offices
Preceded by Henry William Chandler	Waynflete Professor of Metaphysical Philosophy; 1889–1910	Succeeded by John Alexander Smith
Academic offices
Preceded by Thomas Fowler	President of Corpus Christi College, Oxford; 1904–1924	Succeeded by Percy Stafford Allen
