= Robert Morwent =

Robert Morwent was an Oxford college head in the 16th-century.

Morwent was educated at Magdalen College, Oxford. He held the livings at Lydeard St Lawrence, East Knoyle, and Bishopstone, Wiltshire. (Note: This could be either Bishopstone, Salisbury, or Bishopstone, Swindon.) Morwent was President of Corpus Christi College, Oxford, from 1537 until his death on 26 August 1558.

== Notes ==
Academic offices
Preceded by John Claymond	President of Corpus Christi College, Oxford; 1537–1558	Succeeded by William Chedsey
