= Steven Cowley =

British theoretical physicist

Professor Sir Steve Cowley FRS FREng FInstP
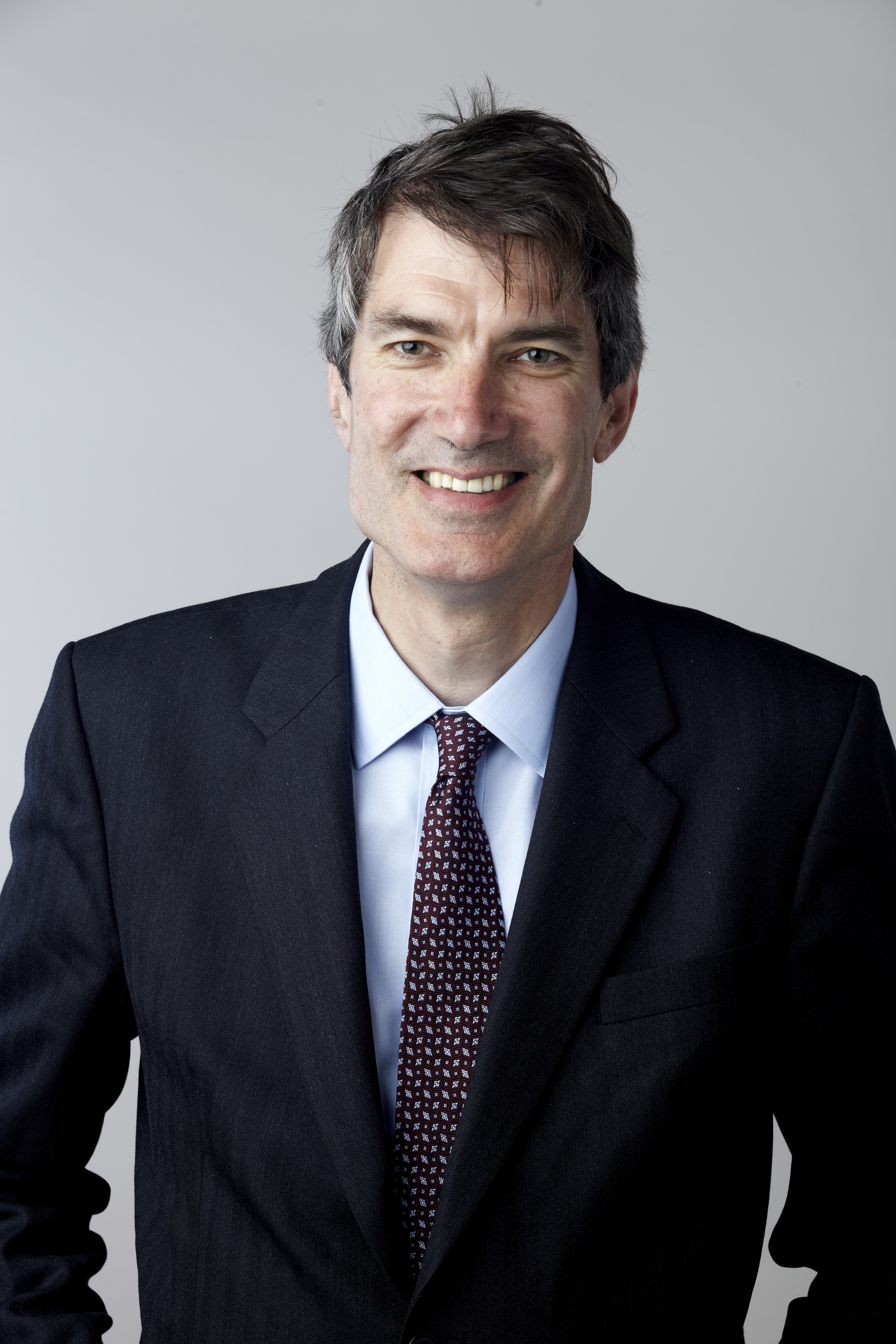
- Cowley in 2014

7th Director of the Princeton Plasma Physics Laboratory
- Incumbent
- Assumed office 1 July 2018
- Preceded by: Richard J. Hawryluk (interim)

31st President of the Corpus Christi College
- In office 1 October 2016 – 30 September 2018
- Preceded by: Richard Carwardine
- Succeeded by: Helen Moore

Personal details
- Born: Steven Charles Cowley; 1959 (age 66–67) Cambridge, Cambridgeshire, England
- Spouse: Margaret Koval
- Children: Sean Cowley and Brendan Cowley
- Website: www.ccfe.ac.uk/researcher_detail.aspx?id=27
- Scientific career
- Education: Corpus Christi College, Oxford (BA); Princeton University (PhD)
- Known for: Fusion power
- Awards: Knight Bachelor (2018); Glazebrook Medal (2012); Harkness Fellowship (1981–83)
- Fields: Physics; Plasmas; Fusion; Astrophysics
- Workplaces: Imperial College London; University of California, Los Angeles; Culham Centre for Fusion Energy; United Kingdom Atomic Energy Authority
- Thesis: Some Aspects of Anomalous Transport in Tokamaks: Stochastic Magnetic Fields, Tearing Modes and Nonlinear Ballooning Instabilities (Convection) (1985)
- Doctoral advisor: Russell Kulsrud

Sir Steven Charles Cowley (born 1959) is a British fusion and astrophysical theoretical plasma physicist. He has served as director of the UKAEA Culham Centre for Fusion Energy between 2009 and 2016, and as director of the United States Department of Energy (DOE) Princeton Plasma Physics Laboratory (PPPL) since 1 July 2018.

Cowley is also a member of the Commission on the Scaling of Fusion Energy, a 12-month effort to create a shared vision for government, academia, and industry on fusion. In May 2024, he was appointed the chair of the board of trustees for the Faraday Institution. Previously he served as president of Corpus Christi College, Oxford, since October 2016.

Cowley's research interests are in plasmas and nuclear fusion, in astrophysical plasmas and the laboratory, such as the Joint European Torus (JET) and the International Thermonuclear Experimental Reactor (ITER). Cowley co-chaired the National Academy of Sciences assessment of plasma science in the United States.

== Education ==
Cowley won a scholarship to Corpus Christi College, Oxford and graduated with a Bachelor of Arts degree in physics in 1981. He went on to study at Princeton University as a Harkness Fellow and was awarded a PhD in 1985 for research into tokamaks supervised by Russell Kulsrud.

== Career and research ==
=== Early Career ===
Following his PhD, Cowley completed postdoctoral research at the Culham Centre for Fusion Energy (CCFE). He returned to Princeton in 1987 and joined the faculty at University of California, Los Angeles (UCLA) in 1993, becoming full professor in 2000. At Imperial College, London, Cowley led the plasma physics group from 2001 to 2003, while also serving as a part-time professor.

=== UKAEA CEO ===
He was appointed as the head of the EURATOM / CCFE Fusion Association in September 2008 and as CEO of UKAEA in November 2009. In this role, he was head of the UK's national fusion laboratory, the Culham Centre for Fusion Energy (CCFE). In this time, he oversaw the operation of the world-leading JET tokamak, a joint venture with other European countries (EURATOM).

His term as director saw the final phase of operation of the UK's national flagship fusion experiment, the MAST tokamak, which entered service ten years before his appointment in December 1999. The tokamak ceased operation in 2013. His term also saw part of the construction period of its successor, MAST Upgrade.

On 21 July 2015, Cowley gave evidence to a one-off evidence session of the UK House of Lords Science and Technology Select Committee, alongside Dr. David Kingham of the Tokamak Energy startup, one topic being the adequacy of government support for private fusion ventures. Cowley left CCFE in 2016.

=== Oxford University ===
On 18 March 2015, he was elected the 31st President of Corpus Christi College, Oxford, his alma mater: he took up the post on 1 October 2016. He is the first scientist to hold the post.

=== PPPL director ===
On 1 July 2018, he was appointed director of the Princeton Plasma Physics Laboratory (PPPL).

As director, Cowley's policy has been to de-emphasize nuclear fusion and high temperature plasma research, turning PPPL into a broad-based laboratory for plasma physics, including low temperature plasmas. This effort involved the construction of a new building at PPPL, the Princeton Plasma Innovation Center (PPIC). PPIC provides laboratory space for plasma-related research areas new to PPPL, including microelectronics, quantum sensors and devices, and sustainability sciences, as well as housing fusion theoretical and computational scientists. He stated he planned for low temperature plasma science to account for 30-50% of the total in future, compared to prior fusion predominance.

At the same time as de-emphasizing fusion, his main stated priority has been to recover the NSTX-U tokamak from its 2016 failure. NSTX-U was the US's flagship fusion experiment, and its failure under Cowley's predecessor "strained the lab's relations with DOE" As of August 2020, NSTX-U was expected to re-start in late 2021. As of 2026, NSTX-U was expected to re-start in 2027.

Cowley has also expressed a strong commitment to basic science research, including astrophysics. At the unveiling of the Facility for Laboratory Reconnection Experiments (FLARE) in June 2025, Cowley said the experiment – which is designed to study magnetic reconnection — represents the next generation of research into fundamental plasma physics and will serve as a collaborative research platform for scientists worldwide.

Cowley supports integrating artificial intelligence (AI) into fusion system design. He told an audience at his University of Oxford Lamb Lecture that integrated modeling systems "with multiscale simulations, plus AI surrogates, plus simulations of the neutrons, simulations of the damage, and simulations of the engineering to try to design a better fusion system" are needed to design the ideal fusion system. StellFoundry is one such project at PPPL, using AI to try to find the ideal configuration for stellarators.

Cowley has also argued in favor of larger investment in physical fusion experiments, arguing that "a digital solution is not enough", calling for "investments in the tens of billions of dollars" to build a fusion pilot plant. He also advocated developing a highly skilled workforce and international collaborations. He stated the belief that "clean, safe, sustainable fusion reactors" will provide baseload power generation "by the end of this [21st] century".

== Awards and honours ==
Cowley was elected a Fellow of the Royal Society (FRS) in 2014. His biography reads:

Steven Cowley is a leading plasma theorist and currently chief executive officer at the UK Atomic Energy Authority. Much of his research career has been devoted to modelling and understanding plasma turbulence in nuclear fusion, a phenomenon that must be controlled to achieve stable fusion.

Nuclear fusion will offer future generations a cleaner and safer source of energy and has the potential to meet the majority of the world's energy demands. At present, however, more energy is required to feed the process than can be produced. Steven is leading the UK's participation in ITER, an experimental reactor that is set to make nuclear fusion commercially viable.

Steven's interest in plasmas extends to those found on a large scale throughout the Universe. He showed that these astrophysical plasmas also invariably exhibit turbulence, which amplifies and shapes their magnetic fields. Steven presented a 2009 TED talk entitled Fusion is Energy's Future and received the 2012 Glazebrook Medal from the Institute of Physics, which rewards leadership in a physics context.

His certificate of election reads:

Professor Cowley is currently chief executive officer at the UK Atomic Energy Authority and Professor at Imperial College. Over the last twenty years he has played a leading role in developing the multi-scale approach to computing the plasma turbulence in fusion experiments. Now such computations routinely reproduce experimental results. Multi-scale computational tools will be central to the successful development of fusion power. He discovered a key mechanism for the observed explosive eruptions from confined plasmas. Using analysis and computations Cowley and collaborators have shown that astrophysical plasmas are invariably turbulent. They have described the multi-scale spectra and structure of this turbulence and how it amplifies and shapes the magnetic field in the large scale plasmas of the universe.

Cowley was also elected a Fellow of the American Physical Society (APS) in 1998, the Institute of Physics (FInstP) in 2004 and the Royal Academy of Engineering (FREng) in 2014. He was awarded an honorary fellowship of the Institute of Engineering and Technology in 2015. In 2011, he was appointed to the UK Government's Council for Science and Technology.

In the 2018 Birthday Honours, Cowley was appointed a Knight Bachelor for services to science and to the development of nuclear fusion. In July 2019, Cowley was awarded the honorary degree of Doctor of Science (honoris causa) by the University of Lancaster for his standing as the international authority on fusion energy.

== Family ==
Steven Cowley is the grandson of John Duncan Cowley, who was the director of the School of Librarianship of the University of London. He is also the great-great-nephew of Sir Arthur Ernest Cowley.

Cowley met his future wife, Margaret Koval, during his graduate studies at Princeton University when she arrived as a new graduate student. Koval worked as an Emmy Award-winning television writer, producer, and director for ABC and PBS. She is now a painter. They married in 1985, shortly before Cowley defended his doctoral thesis. The couple has two sons.

Academic offices
Preceded by Richard Carwardine	31st President of Corpus Christi College, Oxford; 2016 – 2018	Next: Helen Moore
Preceded by Richard J. Hawryluk (interim)	7th Director of the Princeton Plasma Physics Laboratory; 2018 – present	Incumbent
