= CDNB =

CDNB may refer to:

- The Concise Dictionary of National Biography
- 1-Chloro-2,4-dinitrobenzene
