= Richard Carwardine =

Welsh historian and academic (born 1947)

Richard Carwardine CMG
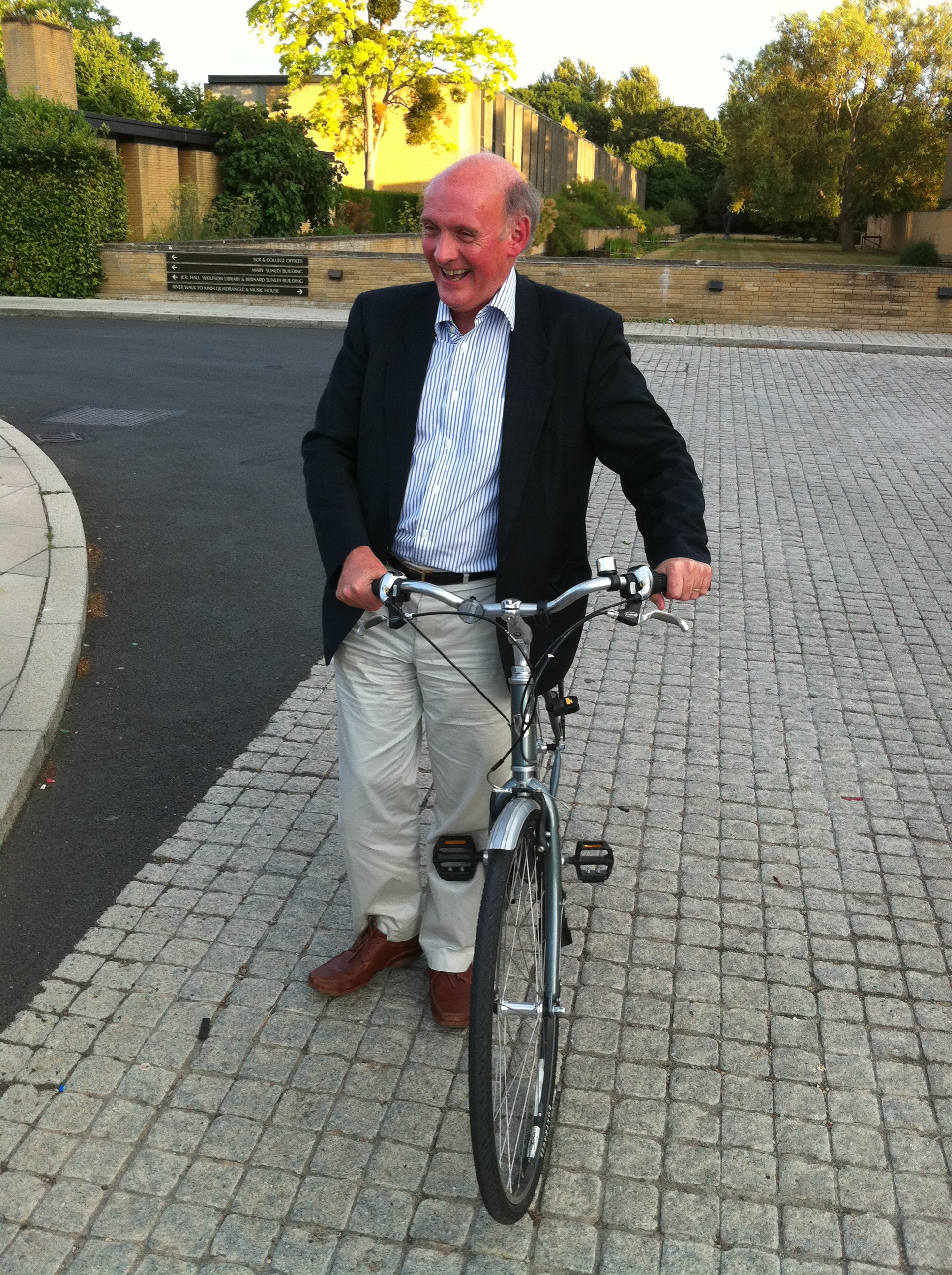
- Professor Carwardine in July 2010
- Born: Richard John Carwardine; 12 January 1947 (age 79); Cardiff, Wales
- Occupations: Author, historian

Academic background
- Education: Monmouth School
- Alma mater: Corpus Christi College, Oxford; Queen's College, Oxford; UCAL, Berkeley

Academic work
- Discipline: History
- Sub-discipline: Politics of the United States; Religion in the United States; American Civil War; Abraham Lincoln
- Institutions: University of Sheffield; University of Oxford

Richard John Carwardine CMG FBA FRHistS FLSW (born 12 January 1947) is a Welsh historian and academic. He specialises in American politics and religion in the era of the American Civil War.

The professor is best known for his work on President Abraham Lincoln and was President of Corpus Christi College, Oxford, from 2010 to 2016.

== Early life ==
Born in Cardiff, Wales, the son of John Francis Carwardine and Beryl Jones, he attended Maesycwmmer Primary School and Monmouth School, before going up to Corpus Christi College, Oxford, as William Jones Exhibitioner, graduating BA in modern history 1968 (MA 1972). He pursued further studies in history at The Queen's College, Oxford, receiving a Doctor of Philosophy in 1975. Carwardine went to the University of California, Berkeley, as the Ochs-Oakes Senior Scholar in American History and Institutions for academic year 1969-70.

While a student at Oxford, Carwardine played the role of Cornelius in the film Doctor Faustus (1967) with Richard Burton and Elizabeth Taylor. In a 2025 interview, he said, "I've continued to act and have just played Cymbeline in the play of that name with the company I helped found in the 1980s, the Abbey Shakespeare Players".

== Academic career ==
Carwardine taught American history at the University of Sheffield (1971–2002), where he also served as dean of the Faculty of Arts. He was a Rhodes Professor of American History & Institutions at Oxford University and a fellow of St Catherine's College from 2002 to 2009. Elected President of Corpus Christi College, he took office in January 2010, becoming a pro vice-chancellor of Oxford University.

== Honours, fellowships and prizes ==
- Fellow of the Royal Historical Society (1983)2004
- Fellow of the British Academy (2006)
- Honorary Fellow of St. Catherine's College, Oxford (2010), The Queen's College, Oxford (2010), Corpus Christi College, Oxford (2016)
- Honorary D.Litt., University of Sheffield (2016), College of Washington and Jefferson (2018)
- Companion of the Order of St Michael and St George (CMG) (2019)
- Carwardine was inducted into The Lincoln Academy of Illinois and awarded the Order of Lincoln (the State's highest honour) by the Governor of Illinois in 2009 as a Bicentennial Laureate.
- 2004 Lincoln Prize Laureate, Gilder Lehrman Institute of American History, for Lincoln: A Life of Purpose and Power.
- 2018 Abraham Lincoln Institute Book Prize for Lincoln's Sense of Humor.
- 2025 Lincoln Forum Harold Holzer Book Prize for Righteous Strife: How Warring Religious Nationalists Forged Lincoln's Union.
- 2026 Lincoln Prize Laureate, Gilder Lehrman Institute of American History, for Righteous Strife: How Warring Religious Nationalists Forged Lincoln's Union
- In 2025, The Lincoln Forum presented Carwardine with its Richard Nelson Current Award of Achievement.

== Bibliography ==
- Carwardine, Richard. Transatlantic Revivalism: Popular Evangelicalism in Britain and America, 1790–1865. Westport, Conn: Greenwood Press, 1978. ISBN 0-313-20308-3 OCLC 4037176
- Carwardine, Richard. Evangelicals and Politics in Antebellum America. New Haven: Yale University Press, 1993. ISBN 0-300-05413-0 OCLC 26931100
- Carwardine, Richard. Abraham Lincoln and the Fourth Estate: The White House and the Press During the American Civil War. [Reading]: University of Reading, 2004. ISBN 0-704-91197-3 OCLC 61810490
- Carwardine, Richard. Lincoln: A Life of Purpose and Power. New York: Alfred A. Knopf, 2006. ISBN 1-400-04456-1 OCLC 60421093
- Carwardine, Richard, and Jay Sexton, eds. The Global Lincoln. New York: Oxford University Press, 2011. ISBN 019537911X OCLC 666242533
- Carwardine, Richard. Lincoln's Sense of Humor. Carbondale, IL: Southern Illinois University Press, 2017. ISBN 978-0809336142
- Carwardine, Richard. Righteous Strife: How Warring Religious Nationalists Forged Lincoln's Union. New York: Alfred A. Knopf, 2024. ISBN 978-1400044573 OCLC 1456985523

== See also ==
- Haberdashers' Company

Academic offices
Preceded by Sir Tim Lankester	President of Corpus Christi College, Oxford; 2010 to 2016	Succeeded by Sir Steve Cowley
