= William Butcher (disambiguation) =

William Butcher is the name of:

- William Butcher (1858–1944), Australian politician
- William Butcher (academic) (died 1585), president of Corpus Christi College, Oxford (1559–1561)
- Will Butcher (born 1995), American National Hockey League player
- Billy Butcher, a fictional character, one of the two main protagonists of the comic book series The Boys
