= James Norris (academic) =

British academic (1797–1872)

James Norris, D.D. (27 June 1797, in Warblington – 16 April 1872, in Oxford) was an Oxford college head in the 19th century.

Norris was educated at Trinity College, Oxford. He was President of Corpus Christi College, Oxford, from 1843 until his death.

Academic offices
Preceded by Thomas Edward Bridges	President of Corpus Christi College, Oxford; 1843–1872	Succeeded by John Matthias Wilson
