= Thomas Randolph (academic) =

English academic

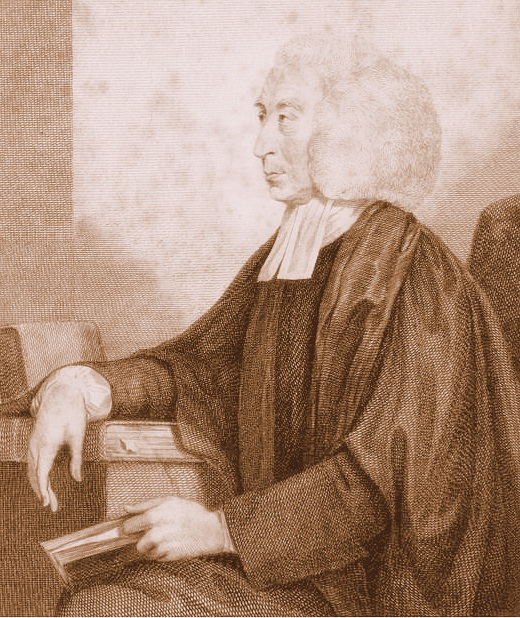
Thomas Randolph

Thomas Randolph D.D. (1701–1783) was an English academic, President of Corpus Christi College, Oxford, and Christian theologian.

== Life ==
Randolph graduated M.A. and D.D. at Corpus Christi College, Oxford, where he became a Fellow in 1723. He attracted the attention of John Potter, then Bishop of Oxford, who, after he became Archbishop of Canterbury in 1737, gave several preferments to Randolph. He became noted as an orthodox Anglican theologian, and in 1748 was elected President of Corpus. In 1756, he was Vice-Chancellor of Oxford University, until 1759. He was Archdeacon of Oxford from 1767 to 1783.

== Works ==
He published a number of works on Christian apologetics and theology, including:

- The Christian's faith a rational assent : in answer to a pamphlet, entituled, Christianity not founded on argument, &c. (1744)
- Party-zeal censur'd. In a sermon preach'd before the University of Oxford, at St. Mary's, on Sunday, January 19, 1752 (1752)
- A Summary view of the laws relating to subscriptions, &c. : With remarks, humbly offered to the consideration of the British Parliament (1771)
- An answer to a pamphlet, entituled, Considerations on the propriety of requiring a subscription to articles of faith (1774)
- A Vindication of the worship of the Son and the Holy Ghost against the exceptions of Mr. Theophilus Lindsey from Scripture and antiquity : being a supplement to a treatise formerly published and entitled a Vindication of the doctrine of the Trinity (1775)
- A View of Our Blessed Saviour's Ministry and the Proofs of His Divine Mission Arising from Thence: Together with a Charge, Dissertations, Sermons, and Theological Lectures, Volume 1 (1784)
- A View of Our Blessed Saviour's Ministry and the Proofs of His Divine Mission Arising from Thence: Together with a Charge, Dissertations, Sermons, and Theological Lectures, Volume 2 (1784)

== Sources ==
- Concise Dictionary of National Biography

Academic offices
Preceded by John Mather	President of Corpus Christi College, Oxford; 1748-1783	Succeeded by John Cooke
Preceded by George Huddesford	Vice-Chancellor of Oxford University; 1756–1759	Succeeded by Joseph Browne
