= Thomas Edward Bridges =

English academic administrator

Thomas Edward Bridges, D.D. (c.1783–1843) was an Oxford college head in the 19th century.

Bridges matriculated at University College, Oxford in 1798, at age 15, graduating at Corpus Christi College B.A. in 1802, M.A. in 1806, B.D. in 1815, and D.D. in 1823. He was President of Corpus Christi College, Oxford, from 1823 to 1843. He died 3 September 1843.

Academic offices
Preceded by John Cooke	President of Corpus Christi College, Oxford; 1823–1843	Succeeded by James Norris
