= John Holt (academic) =

Oxford college head

John Holt, D.D. was an Oxford college head.

Holt was educated at Corpus Christi College, Oxford. He held the livings at Welbury, Cranleigh and Ewhurst. Holt was President of Corpus Christi College, Oxford, from 1629 until his death on 10 January 1631.

Academic offices
Preceded by Thomas Anyan	President of Corpus Christi College, Oxford; 1629–1631	Succeeded by Thomas Jackson
