= Tom Greenway =

Tom Greenway may refer to:

- Tom Greenway (judoka)
- Tom Greenway (actor)

== See also ==
- Thomas Greenway, premier of Manitoba
- Thomas Greenway (academic), Oxford college head
- T. J. Greenway, English metallurgist and mining manager
