= James Ingram (academic) =

English academic (1774–1850)

James Ingram (21 December 1774 – 4 September 1850) was an English academic at the University of Oxford, who was Rawlinsonian Professor of Anglo-Saxon from 1803 to 1808 and President of Trinity College, Oxford, from 1824 until his death.

== Early life and education ==
Ingram was born on 21 December 1774 in the Wiltshire village of Codford St Mary. He was educated at Lord Weymouth's Grammar School and Winchester College before studying at Trinity College, Oxford. He obtained his Bachelor of Arts degree in 1796, promoted by seniority in 1800 to Master of Arts, and in 1808 graduated as a Bachelor of Divinity.

== Career ==
Ingram taught at Winchester from 1799 to 1803, when he became a Fellow and tutor at Trinity College. He was Rawlinsonian Professor of Anglo-Saxon (1803 to 1808), Keeper of the Archives (1815 to 1818), and rector of Rotherfield Greys in Oxfordshire (1816 to 1824) before being appointed President of Trinity College in 1824. As President, he was also rector of Garsington, a village south of Oxford.

His academic interests in Anglo-Saxon and archaeology meant that he had little time to attend to the business of the College or University. His publications included an edition of the Anglo-Saxon Chronicle (1823), an edition of Quintilian (1809) and Memorials of Oxford (3 volumes, 1832 to 1837) with 100 illustrations by John Le Keux. He died at Trinity College on 4 September 1850, and left his books, pictures and coins to the College and Oxford University.

== Selected publications ==
- The utiility of Anglo-Saxon literature: with King Alfred's Geography of Europe. 1807.
- The Saxon chronicle, with an English translation, and notes, critical and explanatory. Longman, Hurst, Rees, Orme, and Brown. 1823.
- Memorials of Oxford. J.H. Parker. 1837.

Academic offices
| Preceded by Thomas Lee | President of Trinity College, Oxford; 1824–1850 | Succeeded by John Wilson |
