= William Case (cricketer) =

English cricketer

Personal information
- Full name: William Sterndale Case
- Born: 24 August 1873; Oxford, Oxfordshire, England
- Died: 18 March 1922 (aged 48); Oxford, Oxfordshire, England
- Batting: Left-handed
- Bowling: Slow left-arm orthodox
- Relatives: Thomas Case, Sr. (father); Thomas Case, Jr. (brother)

Domestic team information
- Years: Team
- 1895–1906: Oxfordshire
- 1896: Marylebone Cricket Club

Career statistics
Competition	First-class
Matches	2
Runs scored	26
Batting average	6.50
100s/50s	–/–
Top score	11
Catches/stumpings	–/–
- Source: Cricinfo, 24 June 2019

William Sterndale Case (24 August 1873 – 18 March 1922) was an English first-class cricketer.

Case was born at Oxford in August 1873 to the cricketer Thomas Case. He was educated at Winchester College, before going up to the Magdalen College, Oxford. He appeared in two first-class cricket matches, the first of which came for the Gentlemen of England against Oxford University at Oxford in 1895, before making his second appearance for the Marylebone Cricket Club against Oxford University at Oxford in 1896. In addition to playing first-class cricket, Case also played minor counties cricket for Oxfordshire between 1895–1906, making 23 appearances in the Minor Counties Championship. He died in March 1922 at St Giles', Oxford. His brother, Thomas, was also a first-class cricketer. His maternal grandfather was the composer William Sterndale Bennett.
