= Barton, Warwickshire =

Village in Warwickshire, England

Coordinates: 52°09′42″N 1°50′48″W

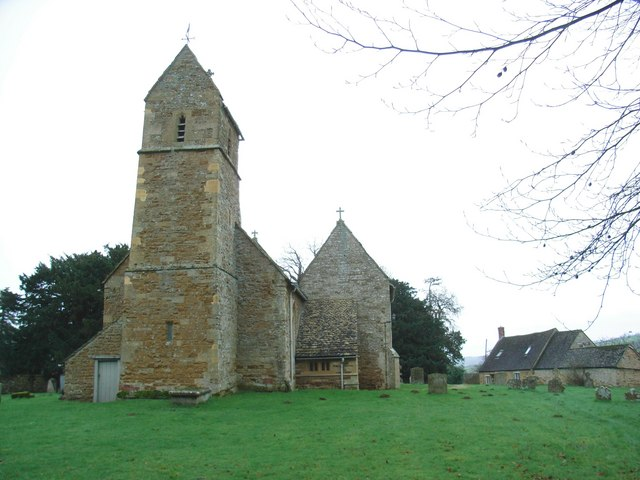
St Lawrence's Church

Barton is a village in Warwickshire, England, on the river Avon, near Bidford-on-Avon. It forms part of the civil parish of Bidford-on-Avon. The name appears in 1315 as Berton.

== See also ==
- Thomas Lee, former rector

== Sources ==
- The geographic coordinates are from the Ordnance Survey.
