= John Cooke (academic) =

English academic administrator

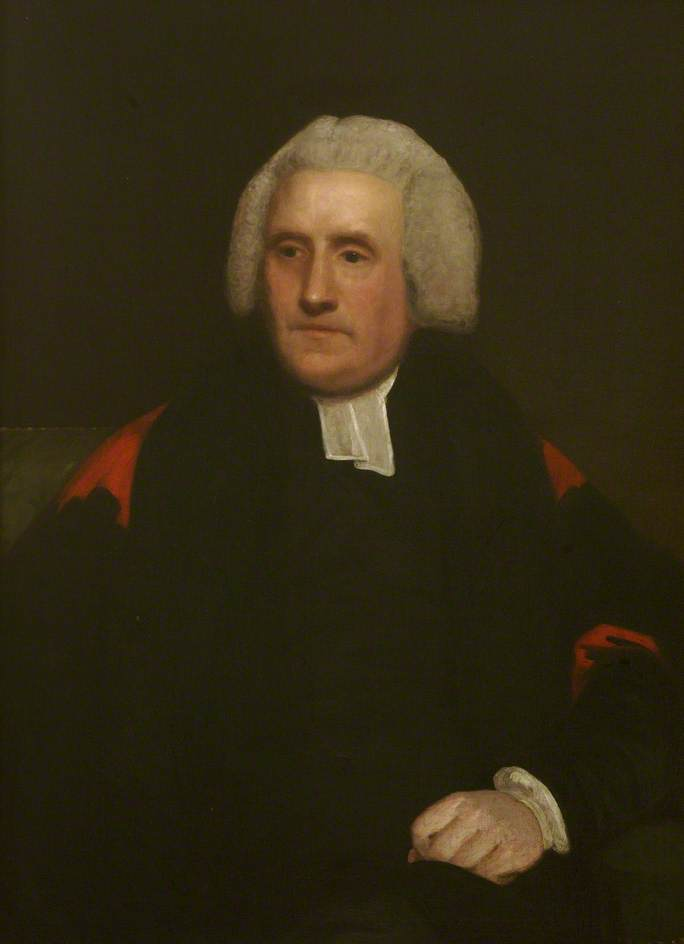
John Cooke (1734–1823), President, Vice-Chancellor, painting after John Hoppner

John Cooke D.D. (1734–1823) was an English academic administrator at the University of Oxford.

Cooke was elected President (head) of Corpus Christi College, Oxford in 1783, a post he held until 1823. While President at Corpus Christi College, Cooke was also Vice-Chancellor of Oxford University from 1788 until 1792.

Academic offices
Preceded by Thomas Randolph	President of Corpus Christi College, Oxford; 1783–1823	Succeeded by Thomas Edward Bridges
Preceded by Joseph Chapman	Vice-Chancellor of Oxford University; 1788–1792	Succeeded by John Wills
