= Basil Kennett =

Basil Kennett (21 October 1674 – 3 January 1715) was a Church of England cleric who served as the first chaplain to the British Factory at Leghorn. An academic, writer and translator, Kennett was elected president of Corpus Christi College, Oxford, serving for a short time before his early death. His 1696 Romæ Antiquæ Notitia, or the Antiquities of Rome was considered the subject's standard handbook for a century.

== Biography ==
Basil Kennett was born at Postling, Kent, on 21 October 1674, and was younger brother of White Kennett, bishop of Peterborough. He was educated under the care of his brother at a school at Bicester and in the family of Sir William Glynne at Ambrosden, Oxfordshire. In 1689 he entered St Edmund Hall, Oxford, under the tuition of his brother, who was then vice-principal. According to Biographia Britannica, "he sat down to his studies with remarkable diligence ... so that he soon became distinguished both by his genius, and the extraordinary advances he made in classical and polite literature." In 1690 he was elected scholar of Corpus Christi College as a native of Kent, and graduated B.A. in 1693, M.A. in 1696. In the same year he published his Romæ Antiquæ Notitia or the Antiquities of Rome, to which he prefixed two essays on the Roman Learning and Education. These essays were the first attempts of the kind made in any language at that time; and the book was so well received by the public, that he was thereby encouraged to prosecute his design of promoting and facilitating the study of classical learning. In that view he proceeded to draw up The Lives and Characters of the ancient Greek Poets, which came out in 1697. The same year, on 14 February, he was admitted Fellow of Corpus Christi College, and became a tutor there. It was probably about this time, pursuant to the college-statutes, that he entered into Holy Orders: after which, directing the course of his studies in a more particular manner to Divinity, he published in 1705, An Exposition of the Apostles Creed, according to Bishop Pearson, in a new Method, by way of Paraphrase and Annotations. This was followed in 1706 by An Essay towards a Paraphrase on the Psalms in Verse, with a Paraphrase on the third Chapter of the Revelations. According to the Dictionary of National Biography, his learning and amiable qualities won him the regard of all parties.

In the late 16th century Livorno - Leghorn - in Tuscany became an English Navy base for patrolling shipping routes in the Mediterranean Sea, thereby attracting a large English community to the city. According to Villani, "The history of the British Factory of Leghorn is also the history of the conflicts that its members had with the Tuscan authorities to assert their right to live openly their religious beliefs. One of the questions that for a long time poisoned the relationships between the English and Tuscans in those years was the attempt made by the British Factory to obtain permission to celebrate Protestant religious services for its members. The religious authorities were against any concession — not because they were afraid of a possible Protestant proselytism, but because they feared the emergence of a spontaneous doctrine of tolerance among the Catholics."

Against this context, and at the instigation of his brother White Kennett and the Society for the Propagation of the Gospel Basil Kennett was in 1706 appointed chaplain to the British factory at Leghorn, being the first to fill that office, and received the degree of B.D. by decree of convocation. The suggestion is made that he took up the post with some reluctance. He was at first much harassed by the Inquisition - the Roman Catholic Church's institutions dedicated against heresy - and had to seek the intervention of the English government, which promised military reprisals for any 'molestation given to her chaplain'. Ill-health, caused by the climate and his dislike of exercise, obliged him to resign, and he preached for the last time on 8 January 1712–13. He returned home by way of Florence, Rome, and Naples, and through France, collecting books, sculpture, and curiosities. He resumed residence at Corpus Christi in 1714, became D.D., and during the same year was elected president of his college, although he was ‘even then very sickly.’ He died of fever on 3 January 1714–15, and was buried in the college chapel.

== Works ==
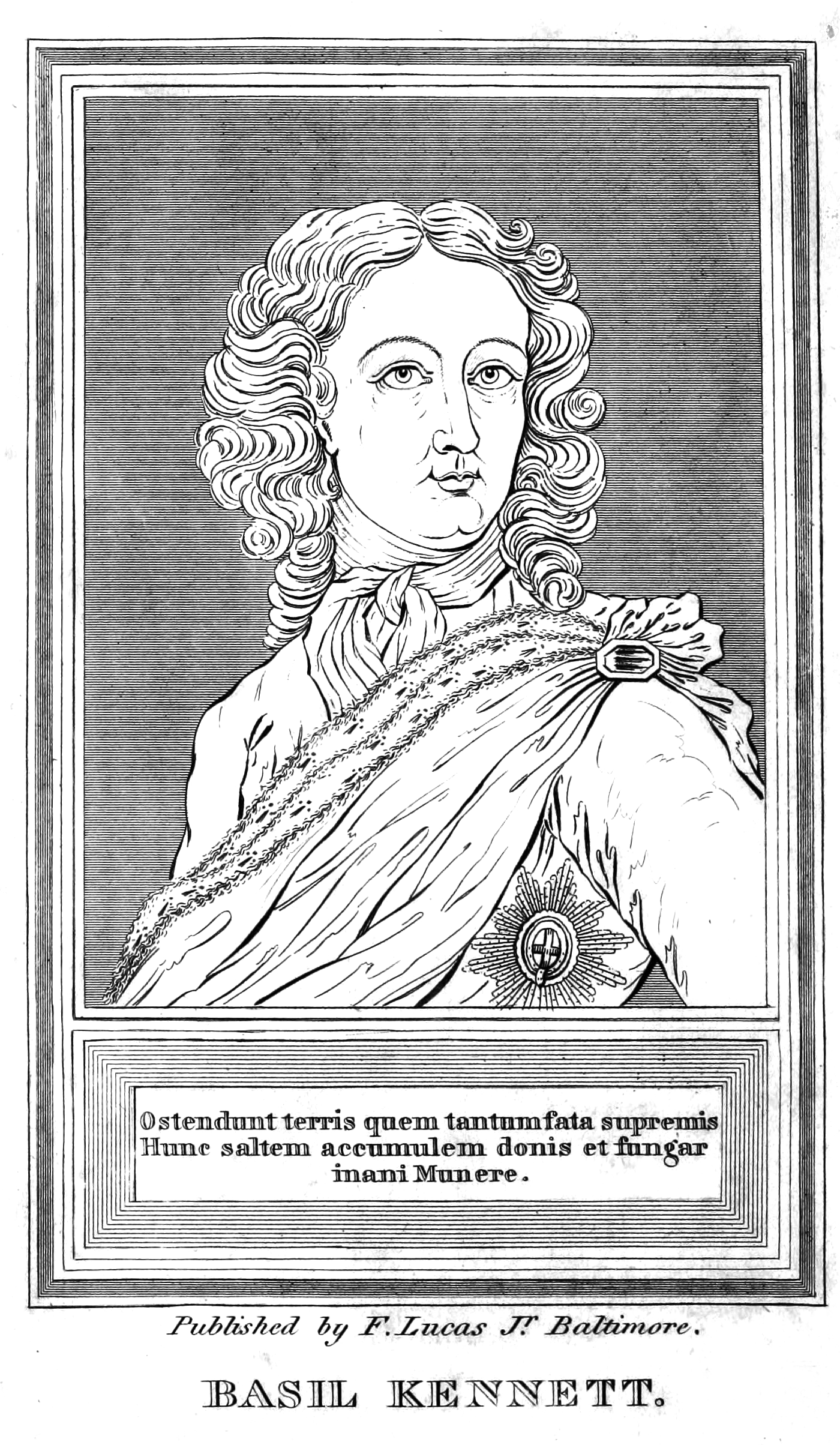
Woodcut portrait of Prince William, Duke of Gloucester from the dedication in Kennett's Romæ Antiquæ Notitia

Kennett was author of:

1. Romæ Antiquæ Notitia, or the Antiquities of Rome. … To which are prefixed two Essays concerning the Roman Learning and the Roman Education, 8vo, London, 1696. This work, which passed through many editions, is dedicated to the Duke of Gloucester. A Dutch translation by W. Sewel appeared in pt. ii. of Seine's Beschryving van Oud en Niew Rome, fol. 1704.
2. The Lives and Characters of the Ancient Grecian Poets, 2 pts. 8vo, London, 1697, also dedicated to the duke.
3. A Brief Exposition of the Apostles' Creed, according to Bishop Pearson, in a new method, 8vo, 1705; other editions 1721 and 1726.
4. An Essay towards a Paraphrase on the Psalms in Verse, with a Paraphrase on the Third Chapter of the Revelations, 8vo, 1706.
5. Sermons preached … to a Society of British Merchants in Foreign Parts, 8vo, London, 1715; 2nd edit., as ‘Twenty Sermons,’ 1727.

Among the Lansdowne manuscripts are the following works by Kennett:

1. Poem to Queen Anne (MS. 722, f. 1).
2. Collections on various subjects (MSS. 924–34).
3. Oratio (MS. 927, f. 19).
4. Lives of the Latin Poets (MS. 930).
5. Letters to S. Blackwell (MS. 1019).
6. Notes on the Church Catechism (MS. 1043).
7. Notes on the New Testament (MS. 1044).

He translated from the French:

1. Bishop Godeau's Pastoral Instructions for an Annual Retirement of Ten Days [anon.], 8vo, 1703; another edition in A Plea for Seasons of Spiritual Retirement, 1860.
2. Pascal's Thoughts upon Religion [anon.], 8vo, 1704; other editions 1727 and 1741.
3. La Placette's The Christian Casuist, 8vo, 1705.
4. Politics in Select Discourses of Monsieur Balzac which he called his Aristippus, 8vo, 1709, with a preface by White Kennett.
5. The Whole Critical Works of Monsieur Rapin, 8vo, 1716.

He also helped to translate Pufendorf's Of the Law of Nature and Nations, folio, 1703 (also 1710, 1717, 1728, 1729, and 1749), and translated Horace's Art of Poetry (British Library Add MS 28276, f. 173). Hearne states, on the authority of James Tyrrell, that the third volume of White Kennett's History of England, fol. 1706, was in reality the work of Basil Kennett. Kennett likewise edited Bishop Vida's Poetica, 8vo, 1701.

== Notes ==
This article incorporates text from a publication now in the public domain: Goodwin, Gordon (1892). "Kennett, Basil". In Lee, Sidney (ed.). Dictionary of National Biography. Vol. 31. London: Smith, Elder & Co.

Academic offices
Preceded by Thomas Turner	President of Corpus Christi College, Oxford; 1714-1715	Succeeded by John Mather
