= Thomas Lee (clergyman) =

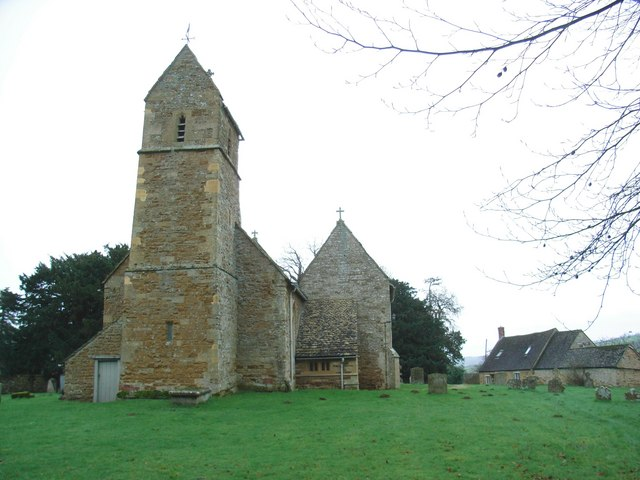
St Lawrence Church at Barton, Warwickshire, where Thomas Lee was rector.

Rev. Thomas Lee D.D. was a 19th-century academic administrator at the University of Oxford and clergyman.

Lee graduated as a Doctor of Divinity at Oxford. He was president of Trinity College, Oxford, from 1808 to 1824. While president at Trinity College, Lee was also vice-chancellor of Oxford University from 1814 until 1818.

The Allied sovereigns' visit to England occurred during June 1814 when Lee was vice-chancellor. Emperor Alexander I of Russia, King Frederick William III of Prussia, and Marshal Gebhard Leberecht von Blücher received honorary degrees during the visit to Oxford.

Lee was also rector at Barton in Warwickshire.

Academic offices
Preceded by Joseph Chapman	President of Trinity College, Oxford; 1808–1824	Succeeded by James Ingram
Preceded by John Cole	Vice-Chancellor of Oxford University; 1814–1818	Succeeded by Frodsham Hodson
