= Thomas Fowler (academic) =

English academic and academic administrator

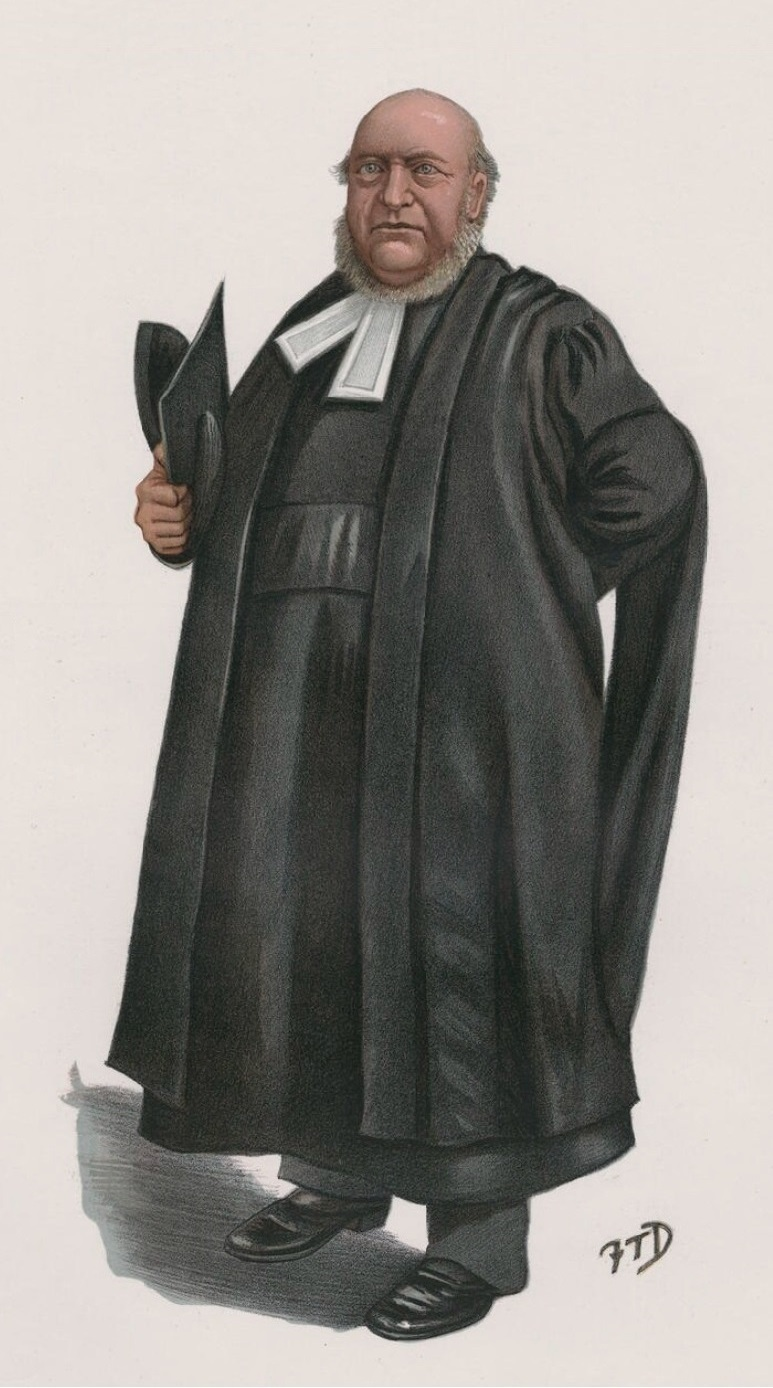
- Born: 1 September 1832; Burton upon Stather, Lincolnshire
- Died: 20 November 1904 (aged 72); Corpus Christi College, Oxford
- Occupations: President of Corpus Christi College, Oxford, Vice-Chancellor of the University of Oxford

Thomas Fowler (1 September 1832 – 20 November 1904) was an English academic and academic administrator, acting as President of Corpus Christi College, Oxford, and Vice-Chancellor of the University of Oxford.

== Early life ==
Fowler was born 1832 in Burton upon Stather, Lincolnshire, son of William Henry Fowler and his wife, Mary Anne Welch. He was educated at King William's College on the Isle of Man, and obtained a Postmastership (undergraduate) at Merton College, Oxford. In 1852, he took a second class in Classical moderations and a first class in mathematics, but he bettered that position in the final schools by taking a first class in classics followed by a first in mathematics in 1854.

== Academic career ==
In 1855, Fowler was elected a Fellow of Lincoln College, Oxford and was forthwith appointed tutor. In 1858, he obtained the Denyer Theological Prize for an essay on "The Doctrine of Predestination according to the Church of England"; he was appointed a Select Preacher from 1872 to 1874, but moved away from theology. In 1862, he held the office of Junior Proctor, and was selected as Professor of Logic in 1873, holding that chair until 1889. He officiated as a public examiner in the classical school on many occasions between 1864 and 1879, and took part in the general business of Oxford University, holding office in connection the Oxford University Press, the Museum, the Common University Fund, and occupying for many years a seat in the Hebdomadal Council.

Fowler was a junior contemporary of men like Benjamin Jowett, Arthur Stanley, Goldwin Smith, Mark Pattison (whom he might have succeeded as Rector of Lincoln), John Matthias Wilson (whom he succeeded as president of Corpus), and Henry Liddell, sometime dean of Christ Church. He belonged to their school of University politics, on the Liberal side in the conflicts of the time, and he took part in the struggle for the abolition of University tests.

He enjoyed university business, and was not a profound and original thinker. He had the gift of writing lucid and scholarly English. His works included two volumes on Deductive and Inductive Logic respectively, which have passed through many editions, and are, in the main, a reproduction for Oxford use of the logical system of John Stuart Mill; an elaborate edition of Francis Bacon's Novum Organon, with introduction and notes; an edition of Locke's Conduct of the Understanding; monographs on John Locke, Bacon and Shaftesbury and Hutcheson; Progressive Morality, an Essay in Ethics; and The Principles of Morality, an important and original work, which incorporates as much of the thought of J. M. Wilson as Wilson ever managed to put on paper. The work is Fowler's own, but it was largely inspired by Wilson, and in some few parts it was written by him.

In 1886, he was awarded Bachelor of Divinity (BD) and Doctor of Divinity (DD).

=== President of Corpus ===
In 1881, Fowler was elected, rather unexpectedly, to succeed John Matthias Wilson as president of Corpus Christi College, Oxford. He wrote its history in a well-researched volume displaying much patient research which was published by the Oxford Historical Society. He was vice-chancellor from 1899 to 1901. His health then failed, and he died unmarried at 12.30 p.m. on 21 November 1904, in his 73rd year.

== Selected works ==
- Bacon Sampson Low, Marston, Searle, & Rivington (1881)
- The Elements of Inductive Logic Oxford at the Clarendon Press (1883)
- Logic, Deductive and Inductive Oxford at the Clarendon Press (1904)
- Novum organum by Francis Bacon, Thomas Fowler (ed., notes, etc.) MacMillan and Co., Clarendon Press, Oxford (1878)
- The Principles of Morals (Introductory Chapters) Oxford at the Clarendon Press (1886), Part II (1887)
- Progressive Morality:an Essay in Ethics Macmillan and Co., Oxford (1884)
- Shaftesbury and Hutcheson (English Philosophers) Sampson Low, Marston, Searle, & Rivington (1882)

Academic offices
Preceded by John Matthias Wilson	President of Corpus Christi College, Oxford; 1881–1904	Succeeded by Thomas Case
Preceded by Sir William Reynell Anson	Vice-Chancellor of Oxford University; 1899–1901	Succeeded by David Binning Monro
