= Joseph Chapman (academic) =

English academic administrator

Joseph Chapman D.D. was an English academic administrator at the University of Oxford.

Chapman was elected President (head) of Trinity College, Oxford in 1776, a post he held until 1808. While President at Trinity College, Chapman was also Vice-Chancellor of Oxford University from 1784 until 1788. He died in 1808.

Academic offices
Preceded by George Huddesford	President of Trinity College, Oxford; 1776–1808	Succeeded by Thomas Lee
Preceded by Samuel Dennis	Vice-Chancellor of Oxford University; 1784–1788	Succeeded by John Cooke
