= Thomas Anyan =

Thomas Anyan, D.D., was an Oxford college head.

Anyan was born in Kent and educated at Lincoln College, Oxford. He held the livings at Beckenham, Ashtead, Checkendon and Cranleigh. Anyan was President of Corpus Christi College, Oxford, from 1614 until 1629. He died at Canterbury in 1632.

Academic offices
Preceded by John Spenser	President of Corpus Christi College, Oxford; 1614–1629	Succeeded by John Holt
