= John Mather (academic) =

English academic administrator

John Mather D.D. was an English academic administrator at the University of Oxford.

Mather was elected President (head) of Corpus Christi College, Oxford in 1715, a post he held until 1748. During his time as President of Corpus Christi, Mather was also Vice-Chancellor of Oxford University from 1723 until 1728.

Academic offices
| Preceded by Basil Kennett | President of Corpus Christi College, Oxford; 1715–1748 | Succeeded by Thomas Randolph |
| Preceded by Robert Shippen | Vice-Chancellor of Oxford University; 1723–1728 | Succeeded by Edward Butler |
