= Thomas Case (cricketer, born 1871) =

English cricketer and brewer

Personal information
- Full name: Thomas Bennett Case
- Born: 19 January 1871; Upton, Buckinghamshire, England
- Died: 10 November 1941 (aged 70); Donnybrook, Leinster, Ireland
- Batting: Right-handed
- Relatives: Thomas Case (father); William Case (brother)

Domestic team information
- Years: Team
- 1891–1892: Oxford University

Career statistics
Competition	First-class
Matches	15
Runs scored	330
Batting average	12.69
100s/50s	–/1
Top score	55
Catches/stumpings	5/–
- Source: Cricinfo, 9 August 2019

Thomas Bennett Case (19 February 1871 – 10 November 1941) was an English first-class cricketer and brewer.

The son of the cricketer and philosopher Thomas Case (1844–1935), he was born at Upton in February 1871. He was educated at Winchester College, before going up to Magdalen College, Oxford. While studying at Oxford, he made his debut in first-class cricket for the Gentlemen of England against Oxford University at Oxford in 1890. After playing in the same fixture in May 1891, he made his debut for Oxford University in the same month against H. Philipson's XI. Case played first-class cricket for Oxford until 1892, making twelve further first-class appearances. In thirteen first-class appearances for Oxford, Case scored 249 runs at an average of 10.82, with a high score of 45. His highest first-class score of 55 came for the Gentlemen of England. Case is noted as the first substitute in first-class cricket, when he replaced Frederic Thesiger in the Oxford XI, after Thesiger had injured himself while fielding on the first morning of The University Match against Cambridge University in 1891. While at Oxford, he obtained a blue in cricket.

He graduated from Oxford with first class honours in natural sciences. He joined the brewing staff of the Guinness brewery in Dublin in 1893 and was influential in the development of the Guinness Research Laboratory, established by the brewery directors in 1901. He married Dubliner Emily Armstrong in 1903, with the couple having one son. Following his retirement, Case remained in Ireland. He died at Donnybrook near Dublin in November 1941. His brother, William, was also a first-class cricketer. His grandfather was the composer William Sterndale Bennett.
