= William Cole (dean of Lincoln) =

English Puritan clergyman

William Cole (c.1530–1600) was an English Puritan clergyman, President of Corpus Christi College, Oxford and Dean of Lincoln.

A Protestant refugee from Marian England, Cole returned on Elizabeth I's accession and was appointed President of Corpus Christi College in 1568, a controversial appointment, since most of the conservative fellowship was opposed to his Puritan beliefs and his status as a married clergyman.

He was persuaded to resign the presidency in 1598 in favour of John Rainolds, with whom he swapped jobs, going to be Dean of Lincoln until his death in 1600.

His daughter Sibilla married, as her second husband, Robert Dover (1585–1652), lawyer, author and wit, best known as the founder and for many years director of the Cotswold Olimpick Games.

== Sources ==
- Stephen, Leslie, ed. (1887). "Cole, William (d.1600)" . Dictionary of National Biography. Vol. 11. London: Smith, Elder & Co.

Academic offices
Preceded by Thomas Greenway	President of Corpus Christi College, Oxford; 1568–1598	Succeeded by John Rainolds
Preceded by Herbert Westfaling	Vice-Chancellor of the University of Oxford; 1577–1578	Succeeded by Martin Culpepper
