= Helen Moore (literary scholar) =

British literary scholar

- Born: Helen Dale Moore; 1970 (age 55–56)
- Occupations: Literary scholar and academic
- Children: 3

Academic background
- Education: Pembroke College, Oxford
- Thesis: The ancient, famous and honourable history of Amadis de Gaul: a critical, modern-spelling edition of Anthony Munday's translation of Book One (1589; 1619) with introduction, notes and commentary (1996)

Academic work
- Discipline: English studies
- Sub-discipline: Early modern literature; English Renaissance theatre; Early Modern English Bible translations; Chivalric romance; Classical tradition; Renaissance studies
- Institutions: Corpus Christi College, Oxford

Helen Dale Moore (born 1970) is a British literary scholar, who specialises in medieval and early modern literature. Since 2018, she has served as the President of Corpus Christi College, Oxford, having first joined the college as a tutorial fellow in English in 1996. She is the first woman to hold that position in the college's 500-year history. She is also a professor of English Literature in the Faculty of English Language and Literature, University of Oxford. She studied for her undergraduate and graduate degrees at Pembroke College, Oxford, where is she is an honorary fellow. She is also a member of the governing body of Manchester Grammar School.

In 2021, she received the Rose Mary Crawshay Prize for Amadis in English: A Study in the Reading of Romance as one of the co-winners. This book was also awarded the Roland H. Bainton Prize for Literature in 2021. In the same year she was elected to membership of the Academia Europaea.

== Selected works ==
- Moore, Helen, ed. (2004). Amadis de Gaule. Translated by Anthony Munday. Farnham: Ashgate. ISBN 978-0754607274.
- Moore, Helen, ed. (2007). Guy of Warwick, 1661. Manchester: Manchester University Press. ISBN 978-0719077098.
- Hardie, Philip; Moore, Helen, eds. (2010). Classical literary careers and their reception. Cambridge: Cambridge University Press. ISBN 978-0521762977.
- Moore, Helen; Reid, Julian, eds. (2011). Manifold greatness: the making of the King James Bible. Oxford: The Bodleian Library. ISBN 978-1851243495.
- Helen Moore, Amadis in English: A Study in the Reading of Romance. Oxford University Press. 2020. ISBN 978-0198832423

Academic offices
| Preceded by Sir Steven Cowley | President of Corpus Christi College, Oxford; 2018–present | Incumbent |
