= University of Oxford tortoises =

Tortoises at University of Oxford colleges

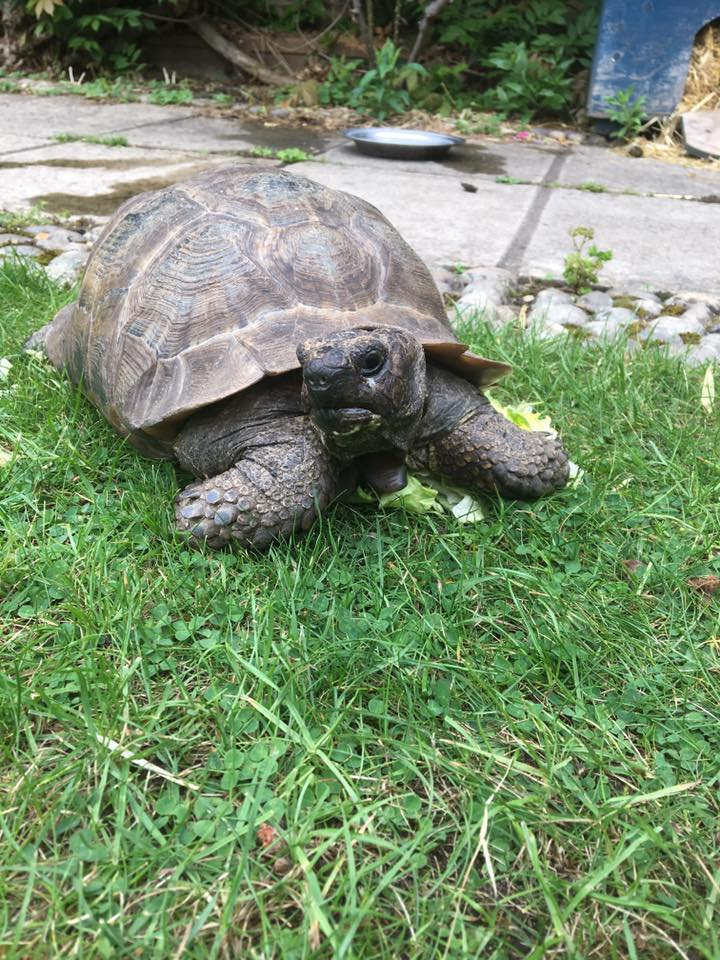
Emmanuelle, or Manny, in Regent's Park College quadrangle in 2017

University of Oxford in Oxford, England has a long tradition of keeping tortoises as college pets. Many of the university's 43 colleges have a pet tortoise that a student, elected the "Tortoise Keeper," looks after.

Each Trinity term, the colleges bring their tortoises together for the Annual Corpus Christi Tortoise Fair.

== History and overview ==
Tortoise keeping has been observed at the university for many years, though no exact date is known. Corpus Christi's oldest evidence of the practice comes from a college photograph from 1898.

Oriel College has one of the longer records of tortoise keeping, going back as far as 1896, but the first known record was the entrance of Mr Testudo in 1938 when his arrival was announced in The Times newspaper:

On May 28, 1928 at Oriel College Oxford, to Georgina, wife of O.C. Testudo-a son (Whalley George).

Georgious exultant, nato testudine, Whalley.

Est bene, si possis credere Temporbius

In 1948, the then Princess Elizabeth, visited Oxford and upon her visit to Oriel College a photo was captured of her with Mr. Testudo.

Oriel College has taken much pride in their tortoises over the years and, early on in the tradition, the tortoise became a symbol of the famous Oriel College Boat Club.

Other than Mr. Testudo, another Oxford tortoise has been in the spotlight. Emmanuelle, or Manny, of Regent's Park College appeared on the television programs Nationwide and Blue Peter in the 1980s. Emmanuelle was bought by the college from Oxford's Covered Market in 1976 and lived at Regent's until her death in 2022. Originally, Emmanuelle was thought to be a male and was named Immanuel or Emanuel, but this was later revealed to be false and her name was changed to Emmanuelle. After her death, Regent's Park memorialized her in a new stained glass window in their chapel.

== Annual Tortoise Fair and race ==
Each Trinity Term, since the tradition was started in 1974, Corpus Christi has hosted the Annual Tortoise Fair and race. All proceeds from the Annual Tortoise Fair and race go to a charity. The charity is selected by the Corpus Christi JCR, or Junior Common Room, in a vote. In the past, the proceeds have gone to charities such as the Disasters Emergency Committee Ukraine Humanitarian Appeal, Papyrus UK Suicide Prevention, and Rory's Well.

At the start of each race, the tortoises are placed in a circle by their respective Tortoise Keeper, or more officially called the "Custos Testudium," inside a larger circle of lettuce. Some of the colleges that do not have a pet tortoise send a student to represent them at the race. These students, called "human tortoises" or "Oscar d'Tortoise," must eat a head of lettuce, then crawl to the finish line, avoiding any of their smaller competitors on the way. The first tortoise and first human tortoise to the cross the lettuce finish line are the winners.

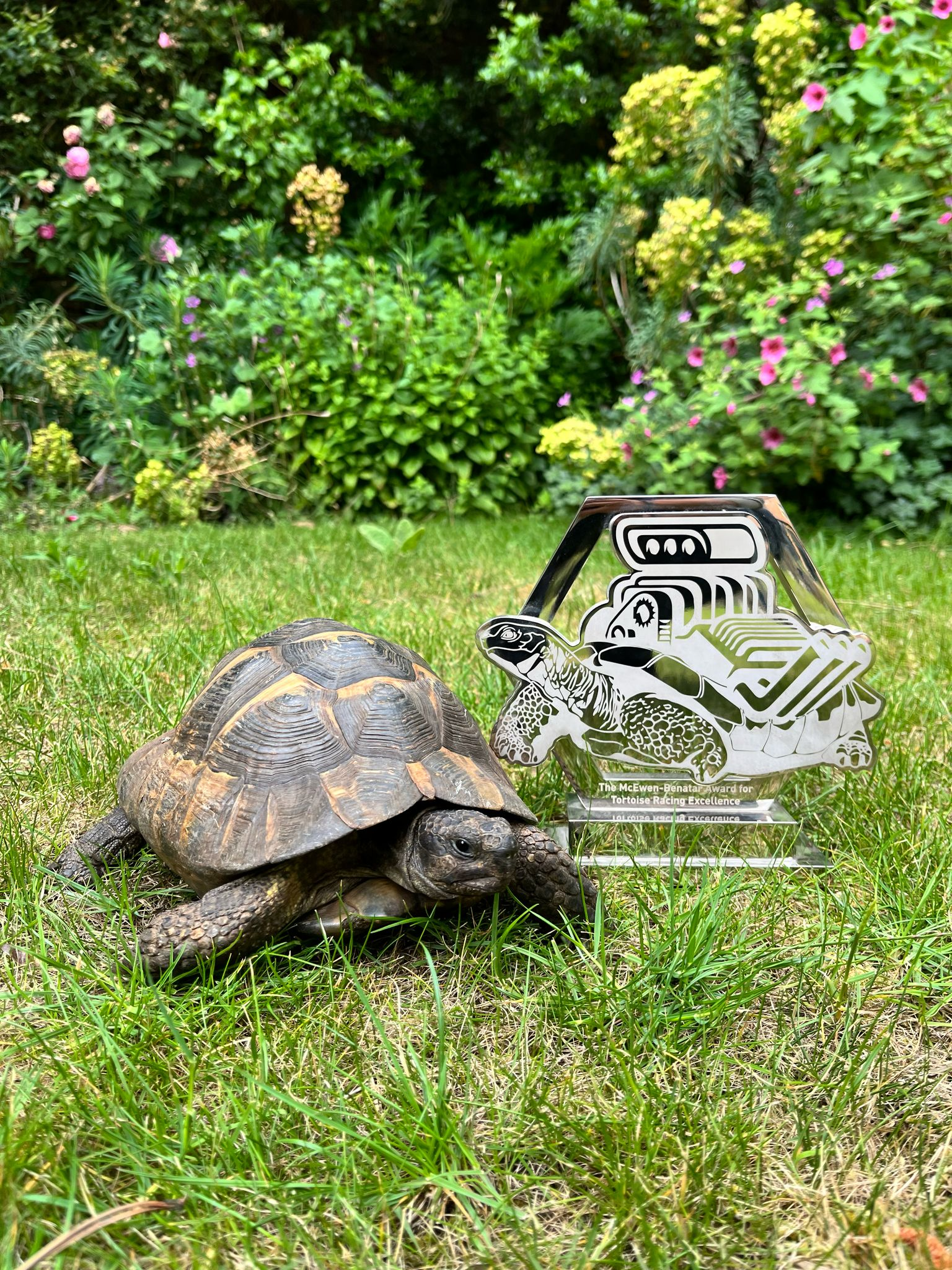
Foxe celebrating with the McEwen-Benatar Award for Racing Excellence in CCC gardens

== Race winners of recent years ==
2025

Foxe - Corpus Christi College

2024

Kale - Nuffield College

2023

Aristurtle-St. Peter's College

2022

Tortilla-Lincoln College

1993

Rosa Luxembourg-Balliol College

1992

Rosa Luxembourg-Balliol College

1980

Emmanuelle - Regent's Park College

1979

Emmanuelle - Regent's Park College

1978

Emmanuelle - Regent's Park College

1977

Emmanuelle - Regent's Park College

1974

Fred - Oriel College

== List of known college tortoises, past and present ==
College	Tortoises
All Soul's College	
Balliol College	Rosa Wendy
Blackfriars Hall	
Brasenose College	
Campion Hall	
Christ Church	Sampras
Corpus Christi College	Christie Oldham Foxe
Exeter College	
Green Templeton College	
Harris Manchester College	
Hertford College	
Jesus College	Tilly
Keble College	
Kellogg College	
Lady Margaret Hall	Daisy
Linacre College	
Lincoln College	Tortilla
Magdalen College	George
Mansfield College	
Merton College	
New College	Tessa
Nuffield College	Kale
Oriel College	Mr. Testudo
Pembroke College	
The Queen's College	
Regent's Park College	Emmanuelle (Manny) 1976-2022 Truffle 2023–Present
Reuben College	
St Anne's College	Tortellini 2016-2020
St Anthony's College	
St Catherine's College	
St Cross College	
St Edmund Hall	Monty
St Hilda's College	
St Hugh's College	
St John's College	
St Peter's College	Aristurtle
Somerville College	Houdini
Trinity College	Plum 2008-2024 Toby 2008–Present
University College	Percy 2007–Present
Wadham College	Archibald (Archie) Theodore
Wolfson College	Metella
Worcester	Zoom Shelley
Wycliffe Hall	
