= William Butcher (academic) =

William Butcher was an Oxford college head in the 16th-century.

Butcher was educated at Lincoln College, Oxford. He held the living at Duntsbourne Militis. Butcher was President of Corpus Christi College from 1559 until 1561. He died 1 November 1585.

Academic offices
Preceded by William Chedsey	President of Corpus Christi College, Oxford; 1559–1561	Succeeded by Thomas Greenway
