= Loxley, Warwickshire =

Village and civil parish in England

Coordinates: 52°10′20″N 1°37′28″W

View of Loxley Hall in 2006

Loxley, Warwickshire, is a village and civil parish near Stratford-upon-Avon, Warwickshire, England. The population taken at the 2011 census was 399. Loxley gave its name to a hall of residence at the University of Warwick, within the Westwood campus. The settlement is first mentioned in the late 8th century, as King Offa of Mercia gave it to Worcester Cathedral. The Domesday Book records the community as including a resident priest. Ownership later passed to Kenilworth Abbey. The parish church was consecrated in 1286, built on the foundation of the earlier Anglo-Saxon church. In 1538, Loxley manor was owned by Robert Croft, later passing to the Underhill family and in 1664 to Edward Nash of East Greenwich.

A village school was built in the 1830s. In the 1850s, the former parish lands were divided between seven farms. In 1910 the village had 59 households. As of 2011, there were 150 households with a total population of 399. While the Robin Hood is mostly associated with Loxley, Graham Phillips and Martin Keatman in their Robin Hood The Man Behind The Myth (1995) suggested that a certain Robert Fitz Oto of Loxley manor was "the true Robin Hood". Historian David Baldwin in his Robin Hood: The English Outlaw Unmasked (2010) proposed Roger Godberd, who is buried in Loxley.

== Notable residents ==
- George Huddesford had "the living" at Loxley at the beginning of the nineteenth century.
