= Thomas Greenway (academic) =

Thomas Greenway was an Oxford college head in the 16th-century.

Greenway was born in Hampshire and educated at Corpus Christi College, Oxford. He became a Fellow of Corpus in 1541. He held the livings at Bowers Gifford, Rettendon, Winterbourne Earls and Heyford Purcell. Greenway was President of Corpus Christi College from 1562 until 1568. He died in August 1571.

Academic offices
Preceded by William Butcher	President of Corpus Christi College, Oxford; 1562–1568	Succeeded by William Cole
