= John Spenser =

English academic (1559–1614)

John Spenser (1559–1614) was an English academic, president of Corpus Christi College, Oxford.

== Life ==
He was educated at Merchant Taylors' School, London, and Corpus Christi College, Oxford.

After graduating he became Greek reader in Corpus Christi College, and held that office for ten years, resigning in 1588. He then left Oxford and held successively the livings of Aveley, Essex (1589–1592), Ardleigh, Essex (1592–1594), Faversham, Kent (1594–1599), and St Sepulchre-without-Newgate London (1599–1614). He was also presented to the living of Broxbourne, Hertfordshire, in 1592.

In 1607 he was appointed president of Corpus Christi College.

== Works ==
After the death of his friend Richard Hooker he edited the first five books of Hooker's Ecclesiastical Politie (London, 1604). The introduction to that work and A Sermon at Paule's Crosse on Esay V., 2, 3 (London, 1615) are his only published writings. He was also one of the translators of the Authorized Version of the Bible, serving on the New Testament committee.

Academic offices
Preceded by John Rainolds	President of Corpus Christi College, Oxford; 1607–1614	Succeeded by Thomas Anyan
