= George Huddesford =

English painter and poet

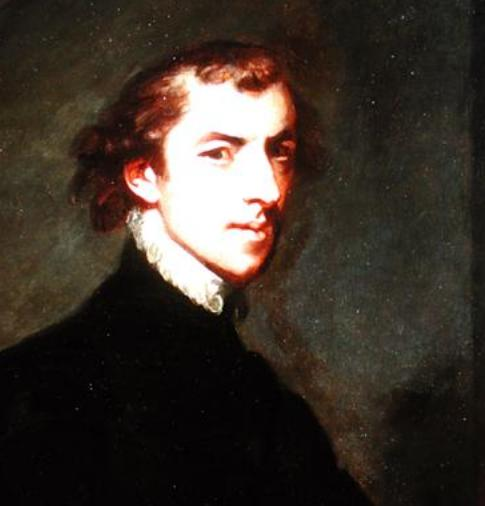
- 1780 self portrait
- Born: 1749; Oxford, England
- Died: 1809 (aged 59–60)
- Resting place: Loxley church
- Occupation: Cleric
- Relatives: William Huddesford was his elder brother

Rev. George Huddesford (1749–1809) was a painter and a satirical poet in Oxford. His first work was described by Fanny Burney as a "vile poem" as it revealed that she had written the novel, Evelina.

== Life ==
Huddesford was baptized at St. Mary Magdalen, Oxford, on 7 December 1749. His father, also George Huddesford, was the president of Trinity College. He attended Winchester College and Trinity College, Oxford. His elder brother, William, was to become a leading creator of the Ashmolean Museum.

Huddesford left his father's college and became a fellow of New College in 1771. Huddesford resigned the fellowship as a result of his marriage a year later. It was said that Huddesford had married in haste and unwisely driven by youthful enthusiasm for his prospective wife.

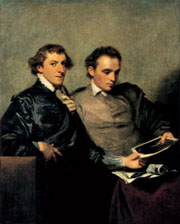
Mr Huddesford and Mr Bampfylde (about 1778)

Huddesford was an amateur painter and was a student of Joshua Reynolds after he left Oxford. Huddesford was able to have several paintings exhibited at the Royal Academy before 1775. He had carried out several paintings in oil, including a full-length portrait of George Lee, the Earl of Lichfield. Joshua Reynolds in turn captured Huddesford in a painting that Huddesford had commissioned, with his good friend John Bampfylde and also complete a painting of Mrs Huddesford. Huddesford's self-portrait from about 1780 is in the collection of the Warden and Fellows of New College, Oxford.

His satire 'Warley, A Satire' was published anonymously in 1778 and was dedicated to Joshua Reynolds. This work was called a "vile poem" by Fanny Burney as it revealed that she was the author of Evelina, a novel she had published anonymously as well as revealing a pet name that had been given to her by Samuel Johnson. Other satirical poems followed with "the French" and rigged elections as targets of his wordplay. One later work was a collection of poetry by old fellow Winchester College students which was called the "Wiccamical Chaplet".

In 1791, Huddesford wrote a comic verse anonymously on the subject of the death of Thomas Warton (the younger) who had been Professor of poetry in Oxford, and a friend to Samuel Johnson, Reynolds and Edmund Burke. This large poem compares Warton to a college cat and it is titled, "Monody on the Death of Dick, an Academical Cat." The poem is littered with clever puns and allusions. The painting of him with John Bampfylde shows the two of them admiring a portrait of Thomas Warton who was master of Winchester College. Huddesford and Bampfylde were close friends, but their relationship was destroyed by the onset of Bampfylde's insanity. Having proposed to Reynolds' niece Mary Palmer (later wife of Murrough O'Brien, 1st Marquess of Thomond), he was turned down, and expelled from the house by Reynolds; Bampfylde was then arrested for breaking Reynolds's windows. He was eventually sent to a mental asylum where he was kept for twenty years. It is said that Bampfylde regained his sanity but died of tuberculosis shortly after reclaiming his freedom.

Huddesford joined the church in the six years before his death in London. His connections had brought him the living of Loxley in Warwickshire and "Sir George Whelkers Chapel" in London.

== Works ==
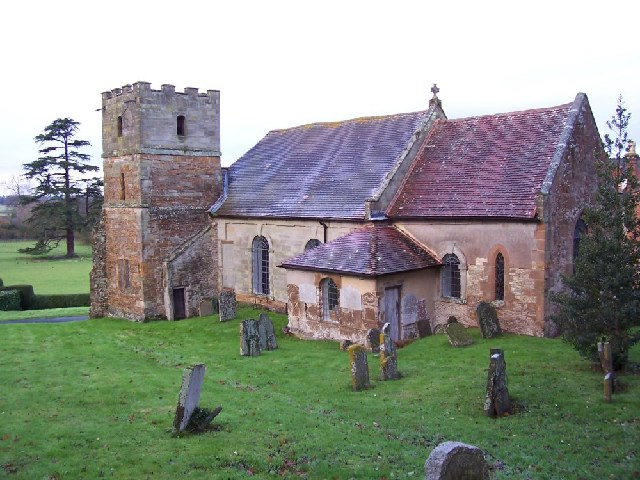
Huddesford's parish church in Loxley, Warwickshire

1. Warley, a Satire (anon.), part i., October 1778; part ii., November 1778
2. Salmagundi: a Miscellaneous Combination of Original Poetry (anon.), 1791
3. Topsy Turvy; with Anecdotes and Observations illustrative of the Present Government of France (anon.), 1793
4. Bubble and Squeak: a Gallimaufry of British Beef with the Chopp'd Cabbage of Gallic Philosophy and Radical Reform (anon.), 1799.
5. Crambe Repetita, a Second Course of Bubble and Squeak (anon.), 1799.
6. Les Champignons du Diable, or Imperial Mushrooms, 1805.
7. The Scum Uppermost when the Middlesex Porridge-pot Boils Over: an Heroic Election Ballad, 1802; two editions.
8. Wood and Stone, or a Dialogue between a Wooden Duke [of Northumberland] and Stone Lion [over his house at Charing Cross, London], c. 1802.
9. Bonaparte: an Heroic Ballad: with a Sermon in its Belly..., 1803.
10. The Wiccamical Chaplet, a Selection of Original Poetry, Leigh, Sotheby and Son, 1804. (Editor)
