= John Matthias Wilson =

John Matthias Wilson (South Shields, 15 June 1814 – Oxford, 1 December 1881) was an Oxford college head in the 19th century.

Wilson matriculated at Corpus Christi College, Oxford in 1832, graduating B.A. in 1836, M.A. in 1839, and B.D. in 1847. A philosopher, he was Fellow of Corpus from 1849 to 1869; White's Professor of Moral Philosophy at the university from 1846 to 1874; and President of Corpus from 1872 until his death.
