= John Claymond =

First President of Corpus Christi College, Oxford

John Claymond (1468–1537) was the first President of Corpus Christi College, Oxford.

Claymond was admitted to Magdalen College, Oxford, at the age of 16 in 1484, where he remained until his appointment as president in 1507. He remained in this post until 1516, during which time he befriended Desiderius Erasmus.

In 1517, Bishop Richard Foxe appointed Claymond as the first President of his new foundation, Corpus Christi College, designed as a beacon of humanist studies. He had been friends with Fox for the previous 30 years. While at Corpus, he also acted as the Public Reader in Humanity (Latin), in which role he wrote his most famous academic work, a commentary on Pliny the Elder in some 20 volumes, which was never published.

He was the dedicatee of Erasmus's work of 1526, an edition of Chrysostom's De fato et providentia Dei. He died in December 1536, and is buried in the chapel of Corpus.

The original stone arch Bulstake Bridge over Bulstake Stream, a branch of the River Thames west of Oxford, was built by Claymond in around 1530. The bridge was later rebuilt in 1721 and 1923–4.

Academic offices
Preceded by Richard Mayew	President of Magdalen College, Oxford; 1507-1516	Succeeded by John Higdon
Preceded by None	President of Corpus Christi College, Oxford; 1517–1536	Succeeded by Robert Morwent
