= William Huddesford =

- Born: 15 August 1732 (baptised); Oxford, England
- Died: 6 October 1772 (aged 40); Oxford, England
- Occupation: Cleric
- Known for: Ashmolean Museum
- Relatives: George Huddesford Sr. (father); George Huddesford Jr. (brother)

William Huddesford (1732–1772) was curator of the Ashmolean Museum from 1755 to 1772. Huddesford is credited with reinventing the museum's reputation.

== Early life and education ==
Huddesford was baptised at St Mary Magdalen's Church, Oxford, on 15 August 1732. His father, George Huddesford, was the president of Trinity College, Oxford. His younger brother, also George Huddesford, was a painter and satirical poet. William attended John Roysse's Free School in Abingdon-on-Thames (now Abingdon School) from 1743 to 1749. After Abingdon he was elected a scholar at Trinity College in 1750, completing a BA (1753), MA (1756) and earned his B.D. in 1757.

== Career ==
In 1755, Huddesford took over from his father as keeper of the Ashmolean Museum at Oxford. Huddesford improved the museum's reputation. His scholarship and his ability to take advice are cited as reasons for his success. Huddesford cleared out many of the collections to ensure that all the exhibits were essential. Amongst the discarded items were two dodos. These ended up at the University Museum and they inspired Lewis Carroll to include a dodo in the opening chapters of Alice in Wonderland.

Huddesford had been ordained in 1758 and served as curate at Garsington before he was made the vicar of Bishop's Tachbrook in Warwickshire in 1761. He was proctor of Oxford University in 1765.

He did not enjoy the best of health, suffering illness as early as 1761. He died unexpectedly at Oxford on 6 October 1772, aged just 40.

== Works ==
1. Edvardi Luidii … lithophylacii Britannici ichnographia, Oxford, 1760, a new edition of the treatise of Edward Lhuyd, whose fossils were under his charge at the Ashmolean. It contained the author's discourse on the sea shells of the British ocean.
2. Martini Lister, M.D., Historiæ, sive Synopsis Methodicæ Conchyliorum et Tabularum Anatomicarum editio altera, Oxford, 1760.
3. Catalogus librorum Manuscriptorum Antonii à Wood, 1761, via Sir Thomas Phillipps at the Middlehill Press in 1824.
4. An Address to the Freemen and other Inhabitants of the City of Oxford, 1764.

== See also ==
- List of Old Abingdonians
