= George Huddesford (academic) =

English academic administrator and museum keeper

- Born: 1699?
- Died: 1776
- Occupation(s): College head; museum keeper; vice-chancellor
- Employer(s): Trinity College, Oxford; Ashmolean Museum; University of Oxford
- Children: George Huddesford; William Huddesford

George Huddesford (1699? – 1776), D.D., was an English academic administrator and museum keeper at the University of Oxford.

Huddesford was elected President (head) of Trinity College, Oxford in 1731, a post he held until 1776. During his time as President of Trinity College, he was Keeper of the Ashmolean Museum in Oxford from 1732 to 1755. He was also Vice-Chancellor of Oxford University from 1753 until 1756.

Rev. George Huddesford (1749–1809), a painter and satirical poet based in Oxford, was his son. His younger son, William Huddesford took over from his father as Keeper of the Ashmolean Museum in 1755.

Academic offices
Preceded by William Dobson	President of Trinity College, Oxford; 1731–1776	Succeeded by Joseph Chapman
Preceded by John Browne	Vice-Chancellor of Oxford University; 1753–1756	Succeeded by Thomas Randolph
