= The Concise Dictionary of National Biography =

1992 three-volume biography collection

- Publication date: 1992

The Concise Dictionary of National Biography: From Earliest Times to 1985 is a dictionary of biographies of people from the United Kingdom. It was published in three volumes by Oxford University Press in 1992. The dictionary provides summaries of all the biographies in The Dictionary of National Biography, presented in alphabetical order by last name.
