= William Chedsey =

English Roman Catholic priest and academic

William Chedsey (or Cheadsey) (1510?–1574?) was an English Roman Catholic priest and academic, who became archdeacon of Middlesex in 1556 and President of Corpus Christi College, Oxford in 1558.

== Life ==
He was a native of Somerset. He was admitted a scholar of Corpus Christi College, Oxford, on 10 March 1528, elected a probationer fellow there on 13 October 1531, and two years later a full fellow. He graduated M.A. in 1534, B.D. in 1542, and D.D. in 1546, having about that time subscribed the thirty-four articles. He became chaplain to Edmund Bonner, bishop of London, who collated him on 9 July 1548 to the prebend of Twyford in St Paul's Cathedral.

In 1549 he distinguished himself in a public disputation with Peter Martyr, held in the divinity school at Oxford. After the disgrace of Edward Seymour, 1st Duke of Somerset Chedsey inveighed openly at Oxford against the reformed doctrines, and in consequence was, by an order in council of 10 March 1551, committed to the Marshalsea prison for seditious preaching; he was imprisoned till 11 November 1551, when he was moved to the house of Thomas Goodrich, Bishop of Ely.

On the accession of Queen Mary he regained his liberty and received several marks of royal favour. He was presented by the queen to the living of All Saints, Bread Street, London; a few days later Bonner collated him to the prebend of Chiswick in St Paul's; and by letters patent, dated 4 October the same year, he was appointed a canon of the collegiate chapel of St. George at Windsor. On 28 November 1554 the lord mayor and aldermen in scarlet, and the commons in their liveries, assembled in St. Paul's, where Chedsey preached in the presence of the Bishop of London and nine other prelates, and read a letter from the queen's council, directing the Bishop of London to cause the Te Deum' to be sung in all the churches of his diocese, with continual prayers for the queen, who had conceived.

On 10 October 1556 Chedsey was collated to the archdeaconry of Middlesex, and by letters patent, 18 June 1557, he was nominated by the king and queen to a canonry of Christ Church, Oxford. In 1558 he was admitted to the vicarage of Shottesbrooke, then in the diocese of Salisbury, on the presentation of King Philip and Queen Mary. He was admitted President of Corpus Christi College on 15 September 1558; but he was removed next year by the commissioners sent by Elizabeth I to visit undertake a visitation the university. In 1559 he was one of the Catholic divines who were summoned to the Westminster Conference to dispute with an equal number of Protestants before an assembly of the nobility. At length he was deprived, as a recusant, of all his preferments and was committed to the Fleet Prison in London. He appears still to have been alive in 1574.

== Works ==
He was the author of:

- 'A Sermon preached at St. Paul's Cross 16 Nov. 1543 on Matthew xxii. 15,' and printed in 1544.
- 'Replies in the Disputations held with Peter Martyr at Oxford in 1549,' manuscript. An account of the disputations was printed in Latin at London, 1549, 4to, and in Peter Martyr's Works. An English translation also appeared.
- Replies in disputations with John Philpot, Thomas Cranmer, Nicholas Ridley, and other Protestant martyrs. Printed in John Foxe's Acts and Monuments.
