= Corpus Christi College, Oxford =

College of the University of Oxford

Corpus Christi College
- University of Oxford
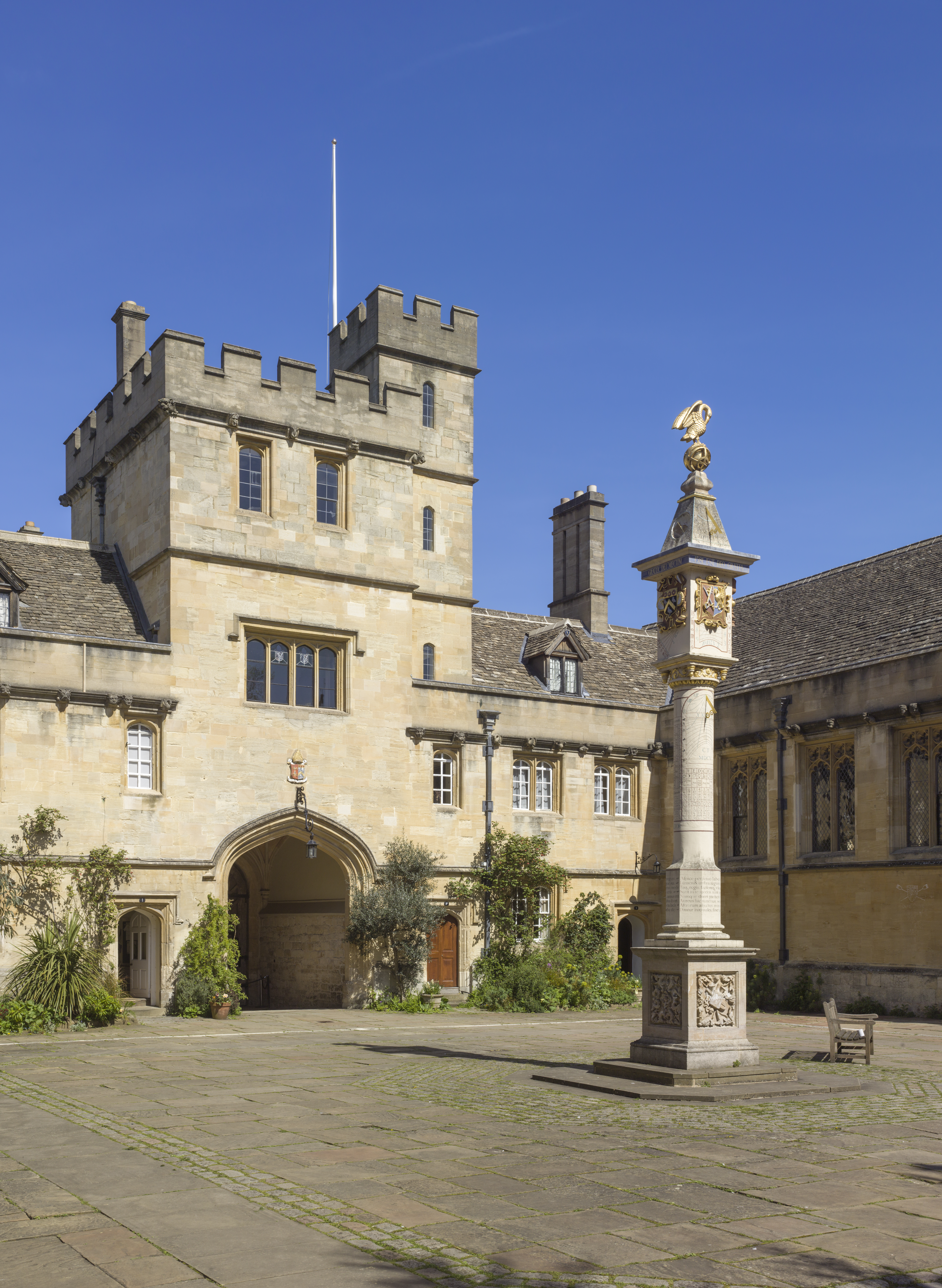

- Arms: see below
- Location: Merton Street, Oxford OX1 4JF
- Coordinates: 51.7509°N 1.2537°W
- Full name: The College of the Body of Christ in the University of Oxford
- Latin name: Collegium Corporis Christi
- Founder: Richard Foxe, Bishop of Winchester
- Established: 1517; 509 years ago
- Named for: Corpus Christi, Body of Christ
- Sister college: Corpus Christi College, Cambridge
- President: Helen Moore
- Undergraduates: c.265 (December 2023)
- Postgraduates: c.100 (December 2023)
- Endowment: £198.1 million (2023)
- Website: www.ccc.ox.ac.uk
- JCR: Corpus Christi JCR
- MCR: Corpus Christi MCR
- Boat club: Corpus Christi College Boat Club

Map
- Location within Oxford city centre

Corpus Christi College (formally, Corpus Christi College in the University of Oxford; informally abbreviated as Corpus or CCC) is one of the constituent colleges of the University of Oxford in the United Kingdom. It was founded in 1517 by Richard Foxe, Bishop of Winchester.

The college, situated on Merton Street between Merton College and Christ Church, is one of the smallest in Oxford by student population, having around 250 undergraduates and 90 graduates. It is academic by Oxford standards, averaging in the top half of the university's informal ranking system, the Norrington Table, in recent years, and coming second in 2009–10.

The college's role in the translation of the King James Bible is historically significant. The college is also noted for the pillar sundial in the main quadrangle, known as the Pelican Sundial, which was erected in 1581. Corpus achieved notability in more recent years by winning University Challenge on 9 May 2005 and once again on 23 February 2009, although the latter win was later disqualified.

The Bishop of Winchester (currently Philip Mounstephen) is Visitor of the college ex officio.

== History ==
=== Foundation ===
Corpus Christi College was founded by Richard Foxe, Bishop of Winchester, and an accomplished statesman. After entering the clergy, Foxe worked as a diplomat for Henry Tudor. He became a close confidant of his and, during Henry's reign as Henry VII, Foxe was appointed Keeper of the Privy Seal and promoted up the bishoprics, eventually becoming Bishop of Winchester. Throughout this time he was involved in Oxford and Cambridge Universities: he had been Visitor of Magdalen College and of Balliol College, had amended Balliol's statutes for a papal commission, was master of Pembroke College, Cambridge, for 12 years and had been involved in the foundation of St John's College, Cambridge, as one of Lady Margaret Beaufort's executors.

Foxe began to build from 1513. He bought a nunnery, two halls, two inns and the Bachelors' Garden of Merton College. Building was probably completed by 1520.

Foxe was assisted in his foundation by his friend Hugh Oldham, Bishop of Exeter, and Oldham's steward, William Frost. Oldham was a patron of education and donated £4,000 and land in Chelsea towards the foundation. For this, he was styled præcipuus benefactor (principal benefactor) by Foxe, remembered in daily prayers and a scholarship was established for students from Lancashire, where Oldham was born. Frost bequeathed his estate in Mapledurwell to the college, for which he and wife were remembered in a yearly prayer and a scholarship was founded for his descendants.

Foxe was granted letters patent for the foundation by Henry VIII in 1516. The college was officially founded in 1517, when Foxe established the college statutes. These specified that the college was to contain 20 fellows, 20 students, three lecturers, two priests, two clerks and two choristers.

Founding fellows of the College included Reginald Pole, who would become the last Catholic Archbishop of Canterbury.

=== Later developments ===
In its first hundred years, Corpus hosted leading divines who would lay the foundations of the Anglican Christian identity. John Jewel was Corpus' Reader of Latin, worked to defend a Protestant bent in the Church of England and the Elizabethan Religious Settlement. John Rainolds, elected president in 1598, suggested the idea of the King James Bible and contributed to its text. Richard Hooker, author of the influential Of the Laws of Ecclesiastical Polity, was deputy professor of Hebrew.

No one county in England bare three such men (contemporary at large) [Jewel, Rainolds and Hooker] in what college soever they were bred, no college in England bred three such men, in what county soever they were born.

— Thomas Fuller, The Church History of Britain

The Spanish humanist Juan Luis Vives taught at Corpus during the 1520s while tutor to Mary Tudor, later Mary I of England. John Keble, a leader of the Oxford Movement, was an undergraduate at Corpus at the start of the 19th century, and went on to a fellowship at Oriel and to have a college named after him (Keble College, Oxford).

Having been founded nearly half a millennium earlier as a college for men only, Corpus Christi was among many of Oxford's men's colleges to admit its first female undergraduate students in 1979 (though women graduate students had been admitted five years earlier). Corpus Women's Boat Club was founded in 1978 and won their Blades rowing in the summer Eights that year. Between 2015 and 2017, 0.6% of UK undergraduates admitted to Corpus were black.

== Buildings and gardens ==
=== Buildings ===
The main buildings on the main college site are the Front Quad, the West Building, the MBI Al Jaber Auditorium, the Fellows' Building, Gentleman-Commoners' Quad and Thomas Quad.

The Front Quad was built for the college's foundation and designed in an archetypal Oxford college style, with a tower over the main gate. The quad was constructed by distinguished builders associated with Henry VIII's Office of Work: master mason William Vertue, master mason William East and carpenter Humphrey Coke (Warden of the Carpenter's Company in London). The quad's architecture later inspired that of Oglethorpe University. Although by then considered heavily antiquated, in 1625 battlements were added to make the effect more complete and akin to other colleges.

The chapel adjoins the library and is just off the Front Quad. Its location is unusual: many colleges (even small ones) had their chapel in their main quad, with some colleges placing them on the first floor to fit them in (e.g. Lincoln and Brasenose). Its lectern is one of the first bronze eagle lecterns in Oxford; it is the only pre-Reformation one and was a gift of the first president. The chapel's altarpiece is a copy of Ruben's Adoration of the Shepherds, a gift from the antiquarian Sir Richard Worsley.

Later buildings on the main site include the Fellows' Building of 1706–1716, the Gentlemen Commoners' Building of 1737 and the Emily Thomas Building, designed by T.H. Hughes, of 1928.

On the corner of Merton Street and Magpie Lane, lie the Jackson and Oldham buildings and Kybald Twychen, which all house students. In 1884–85, the architect T. G. Jackson had first installed a 'New Building and Annexe', replacing town houses on Magpie Lane. In 1969, this work was trimmed and modified to make space for a further new building created by Philip Powell and Hidalgo Moya using a modernist beehive design, while leaving Jackson's Annexe substantially intact. Powell and Moya's building uses local limestone rubble and has the architects' characteristically large windows mounted within an exposed concrete frame. Particular attention was paid to placing the design within the existing architectural context, including the plain wall of Oriel College, Merton's Gothic chapel and Jackson's heavily ornamented Annexe. In 2017, the New Building and Annexe were substantially renovated and renamed the Oldham and Jackson Buildings, respectively.

Corpus also owns several buildings further afield: the Liddell Building on Iffley Road (built with Christ Church in 1991), the Lampl Building on Park End Street (completed in 2014 and named after Sir Peter Lampl) and houses on Banbury Road.

=== Library ===
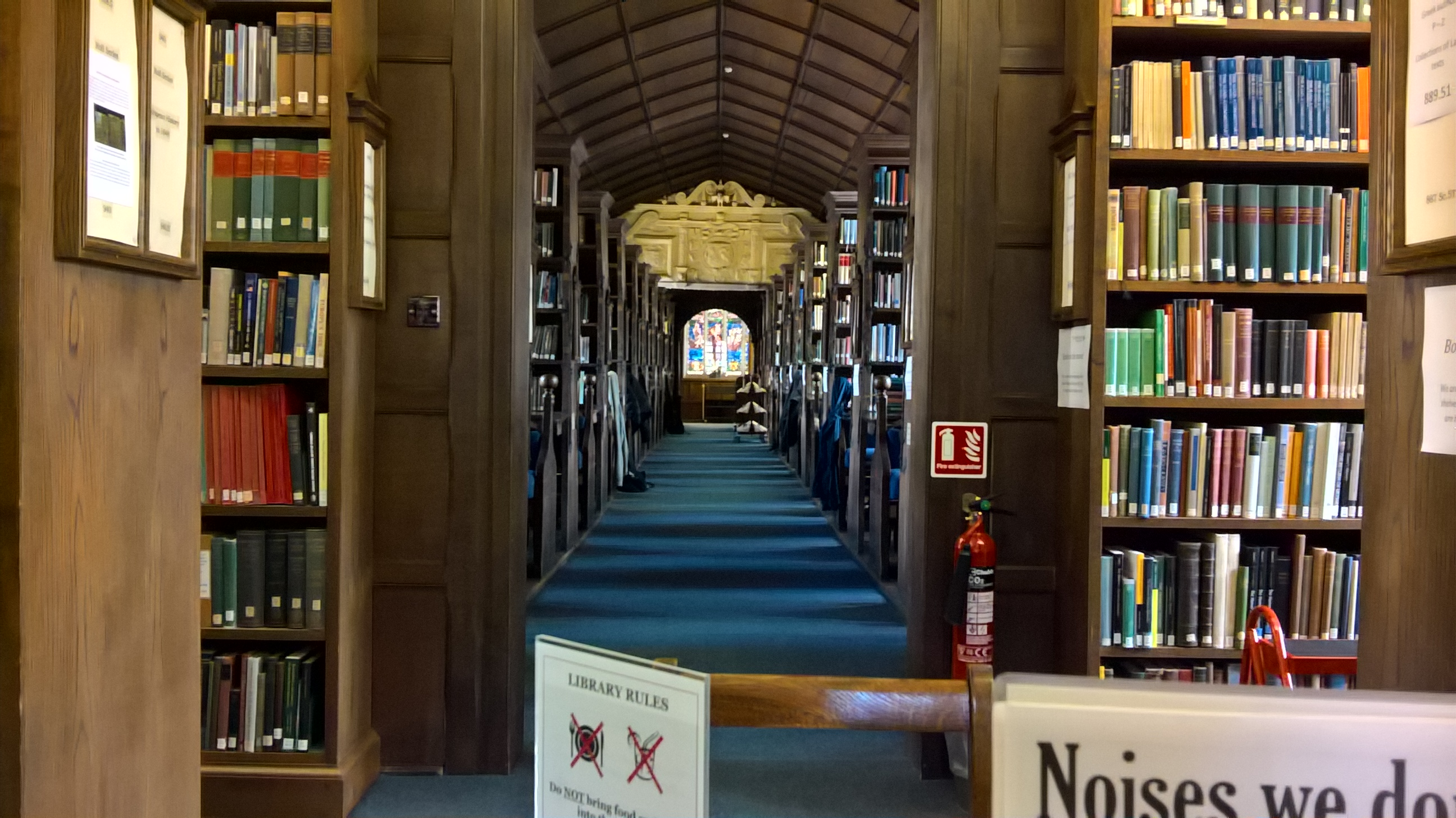
The aisle of the library as seen from the former President's Study in the far west end. The chapel is visible through a pane of glass at the end of the library.

The college library was "probably, when completed, the largest and best furnished library then in Europe". The scholar Erasmus noted in a letter of 1519 to the first President, John Claymond, that it was a library "inter praecipua decora Britanniae" ("among the chief beauties of Britain"), and praised it as a "biblioteca trilinguis" ("trilingual library") containing, as it did, books in Latin, Greek and Hebrew. The library windows in the front quad are framed by seven bamboo plants.

=== Pelican Sundial ===
A sketch by Robert Hegge of the dial c. 1600.

The Pelican Sundial is the large pillar in the centre of Corpus' main quad and dates from 1579. The sundial is named after the gold-painted Pelican on an armillary sphere at the top of the pillar. "Pelican Sundial" is a misnomer, as the pillar contains 27 separate sundials. Nine of the sundials are found easily: four on each face of the square frustum beneath the pelican, four beneath each coat of arms on the cuboid and one facing south on the curved pillar shaft. The remaining sundials are found on the hollows and scallops surrounding the east and west arms. The symbols surrounding the sundials are used to reckon feast days and the signs of the Zodiac. The pillar shaft is covered by three tables: one for calculating the dates of the movable and fixed feasts and the Oxford and legal terms; one being a perpetual calendar and one for finding the time by moonlight.

==== History and copies ====
The Pelican Sundial was designed by Charles Turnball and is sometimes called the Turnball Sundial after him. Turnball lived in Corpus for 8 years, reaching the degree of MA. He went on to publish the book A Perfect and Easie Treatise of the Use of the Coelestial Globe in 1585, but it is otherwise unknown what he went on to do.

The Pelican Sundial was not the first sundial at Corpus. Before it was erected, one had been designed for the college by Nicholas Kratzer, an astrologer and horologer for Henry VIII. Like Juan Luis Vives, he was probably one of Cardinal Wolsey's lecturers who resided at Corpus while waiting for the completion of Cardinal College. Kratzer designed many dials, however only three can definitely be attributed to him: fixed ones for the University Church of St Mary the Virgin and Corpus and a portable one for Cardinal Wolsey. Only Wolsey's survives; (Note: The dial is currently held by Oxford Museum of the History of Science.) Kratzer's Corpus dial stood in the garden until around 1706, when the gardens were remodelled for the construction of the Fellows' Building.

The dial has required regular maintenance throughout existence. The markings were replaced many times over the centuries and, despite restorations overseen by a professor of natural sciences and a historian of science, Robert Gunther, more and more errors crept into the pillar's tables. The dial also developed a lean. This was fixed in 1967 after it was discovered that the dial had no solid foundation and that its base was made of stone panels loosely packed with rubble. In 1976, the sundial was restored (and its tables corrected) to its state c. 1710 by Philip Pattenden. Since the 1710 tables were designed for the Julian calendar, they have no modern use. The sundial was most recently restored in 2016.

Two copies of the Pelican Sundial exist in America. The first, the Mather Sundial in Princeton University, was commissioned by William Mather as a goodwill gesture between the United Kingdom to the United States. The second is on the front lawn of Pomfret School in Connecticut and was donated in 1912 by the father of a graduating student.

=== Gardens ===
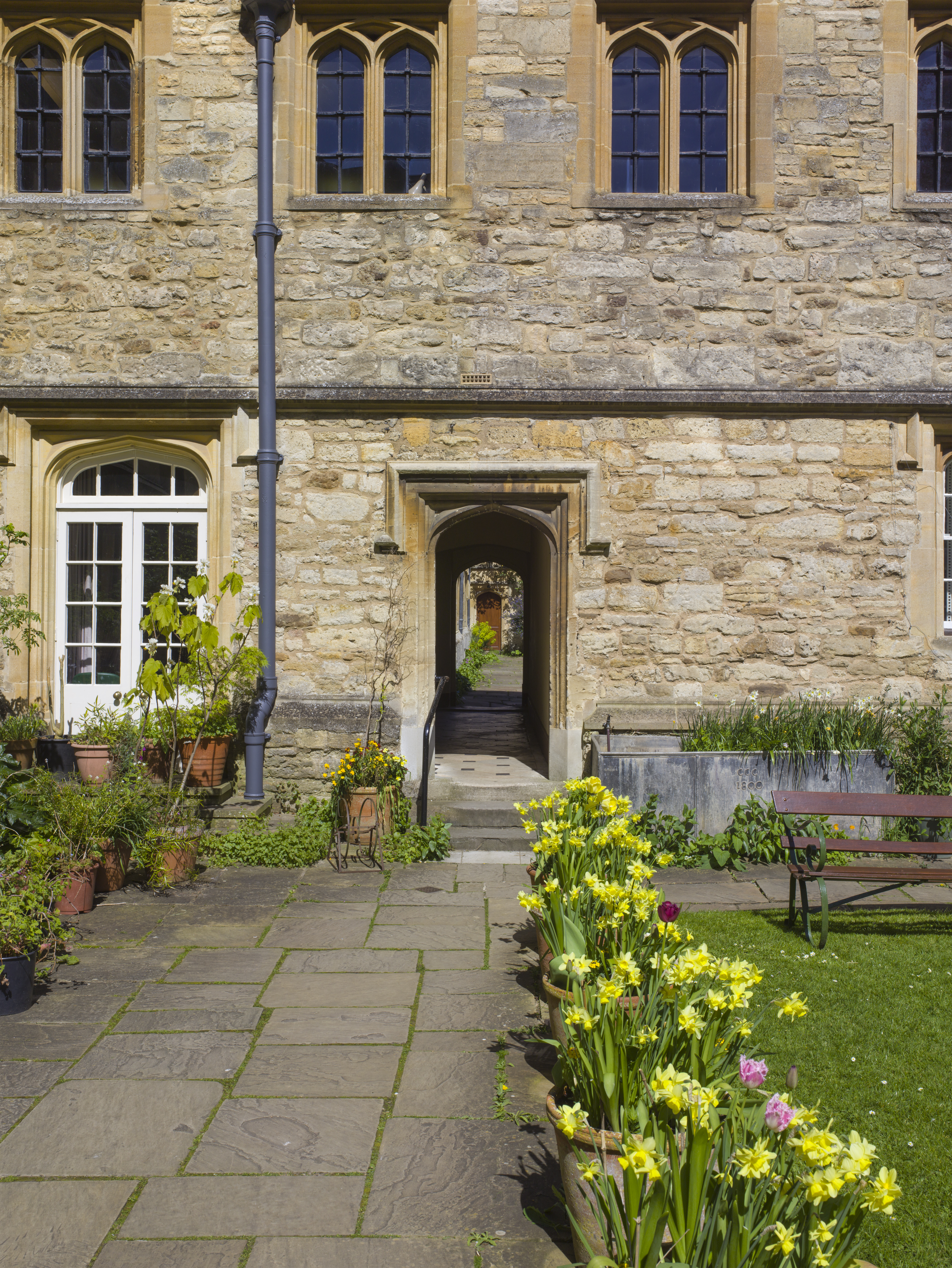
View from Small Garden towards Front Quad

Aspects of the evolution of the college's ornamental gardens (Grade II listed) have been documented since the late 16th century. (Note: The main garden, as seen today, is situated on the land the founder acquired in 1515 from Merton College (where it had been the site of their Bachelor's Garden).) By the turn of the 19th century, a series of strict, geometrical layouts had given way to more informal features, including a lawn in the main garden, bordered by a dense shrubbery.

In their present form, as tended by David Leake since 1979, the gardens are considered some of the university's most unusual and exuberant. Described as 'wild' gardens, the stated aim is to blend a "range of wild and cultivated flowers into a vivid yet harmonious landscape." Attention to detail marks even the most intimate of spaces, such as those around the 'small garden' linking the front quad to the main garden at the back of the college.

The main garden is flanked on one side by the distinctive neoclassical architecture of the Fellows' Building, which is exuberantly bordered by ornamental shrubs and perennials, overseen by climbing roses and wisteria. Across the lawn, a bank shaded by a dominant copper beech leads up to a vantage point on the old Oxford city wall (above Dead Man's Walk), where a line of three lime trees traces the course of a terraced avenue that was originally raised in 1623. The views from here across Christ Church Meadow and into the gardens of neighbouring colleges suggest a "pleasant gardening outpost."

The style of gardening is, in Leake's words, "much less formal than [in] most other colleges, but sympathetic to the atmosphere." Accordingly, the library windows in the front quad are framed by seven bamboo plants. Beekeeping echoes the founder's wish for the college to be a hive of activity. (Note: A surviving foxhole also references Richard Foxe in a more humane way than the fox that can be seen chained up in a yard in David Loggan's bird's-eye view of the college engraved in 1675.)

Use of herbicides and fertilisers is avoided even on the main lawn, which characteristically is allowed to incorporate plants that have self-seeded, in keeping with an overall wildlife-friendly approach (for example, spontaneous red valerian can provide a food plant for caterpillars of the hummingbird hawk-moth).

Examples of exotic plants that have been cultivated include Campsis radicans (trumpet vine), Dracunculus vulgaris (dragon lily), Gunnera manicata (Brazilian giant-rhubarb), Philadelphus microphyllus (littleleaf mock-orange), and Zantedeschia aethiopica (arum lily). Trees include a Wollemi pine (a species rediscovered in Australia in 1994) and quince (whose fruit is given to college fellows and friends).

The greenhouse was designed by Rick Mather, the creator of the college's auditorium. (Note: The auditorium was built in what used to be the fellows' private garden, with its rooftop Handa Terrace providing a further viewing area for the remaining gardens and their surroundings.) Almost frameless, it presents itself as a display cabinet in which a variety of horticultural and other informal exhibits are watched over by a surreally attired mannequin named Madame Lulu.

== Coat of arms and other symbols ==
The coat of arms marshalls three distinct coats of arms in adjacent vertical divisions, in heraldic terminology: tierced per pale, from dexter (viewer's left) to sinister (viewer's right):

- 1: Azure, a pelican with wings endorsed vulning herself or (arms of the founder, Richard Foxe, Bishop of Winchester);
- 2: Argent, thereon an escutcheon charged with the arms of the See of Winchester (i.e. Gules, two keys addorsed in bend the uppermost or the other argent a sword interposed between them in bend sinister of the third pommel and hilt of the second the escutcheon ensigned with a mitre of the last);
- 3: Sable, a chevron or between three owls argent on a chief of the second as many roses gules seeded of the second barbed vert (arms of Hugh Oldham (1452–1519), Bishop of Exeter.)

The Pelican in her Piety (pecking her own breast to draw blood to feed her chicks) in the personal arms of the founder, Bishop Richard Foxe, in Christian iconography symbolises Christ, who nourished the Church with his blood, which action is remembered in the Eucharist. The name of the college founded by him is thus well suited to that iconography, Corpus Christi signifying in Latin "the body of Christ".

Because of the complexity of the arms they are not suitable for use on items such as the college tie, where the pelican alone is used. The pelican also appears alone on the college flag and on top of the Pelican Sundial.

== Traditions ==
The grace laid out in the founding statutes is still said before every formal dinner in hall:

Nos miseri et egentes homines pro hoc cibo, quem in alimonium corporis nostri sanctificatum es largitus, ut eo recte utamur, Tibi, Deus omnipotens, Pater caelestis, reverenter gratias agimus; simul obsecrantes, ut cibum angelorum, panem verum caelestem, Dei Verbum aeternum, Iesum Christum Dominum nostrum, nobis impertiaris, ut Eo mens nostra pascatur, et per carnem et sanguinem Eius alamur, foveamur, corroboremur.

which translates to

We wretched and needy mortals give reverent thanks to you, almighty God, heavenly Father, for this food, which you have given us to nourish our bodies, praying at the same time that you may bestow on us the food of angels, the true heavenly bread, the eternal Word of God, Jesus Christ Our Lord, that our souls may feed on him, and that through his flesh and blood we may be nourished, cherished and strengthened.

There is also a shorter grace said after dinner, which is now only used on special occasions.

The college traditionally keeps at least one tortoise as a living mascot, cared for by an elected 'Tortoise Keeper'. The 'Tortoise Fair', at which the Corpus tortoise(s) are raced against other University of Oxford tortoises belonging to other colleges and local residents, is an annual event held to raise funds for charity. As of 2013, the college tortoise was named 'Foxe', after the founder of the college. The Tortoise Fair had its 50th anniversary in 2024.

== People associated with the college ==
=== Notable former students and fellows ===
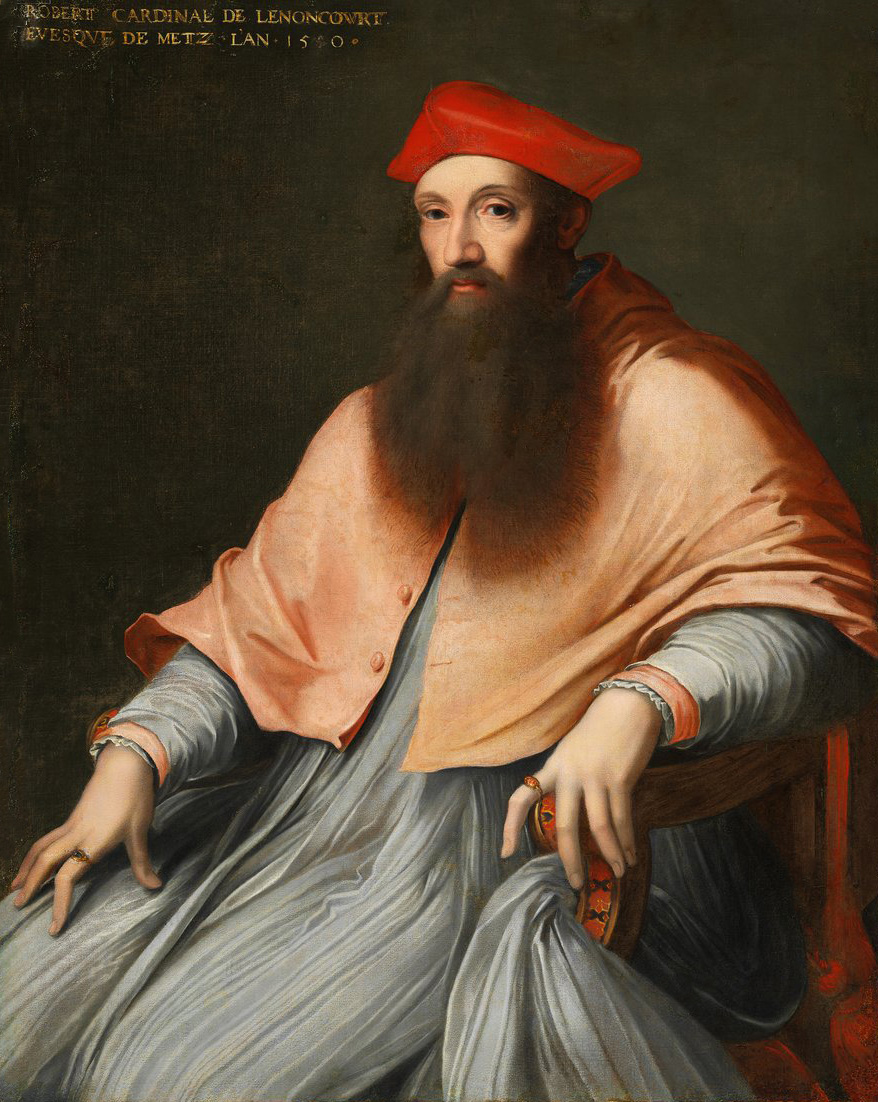
Reginald Pole

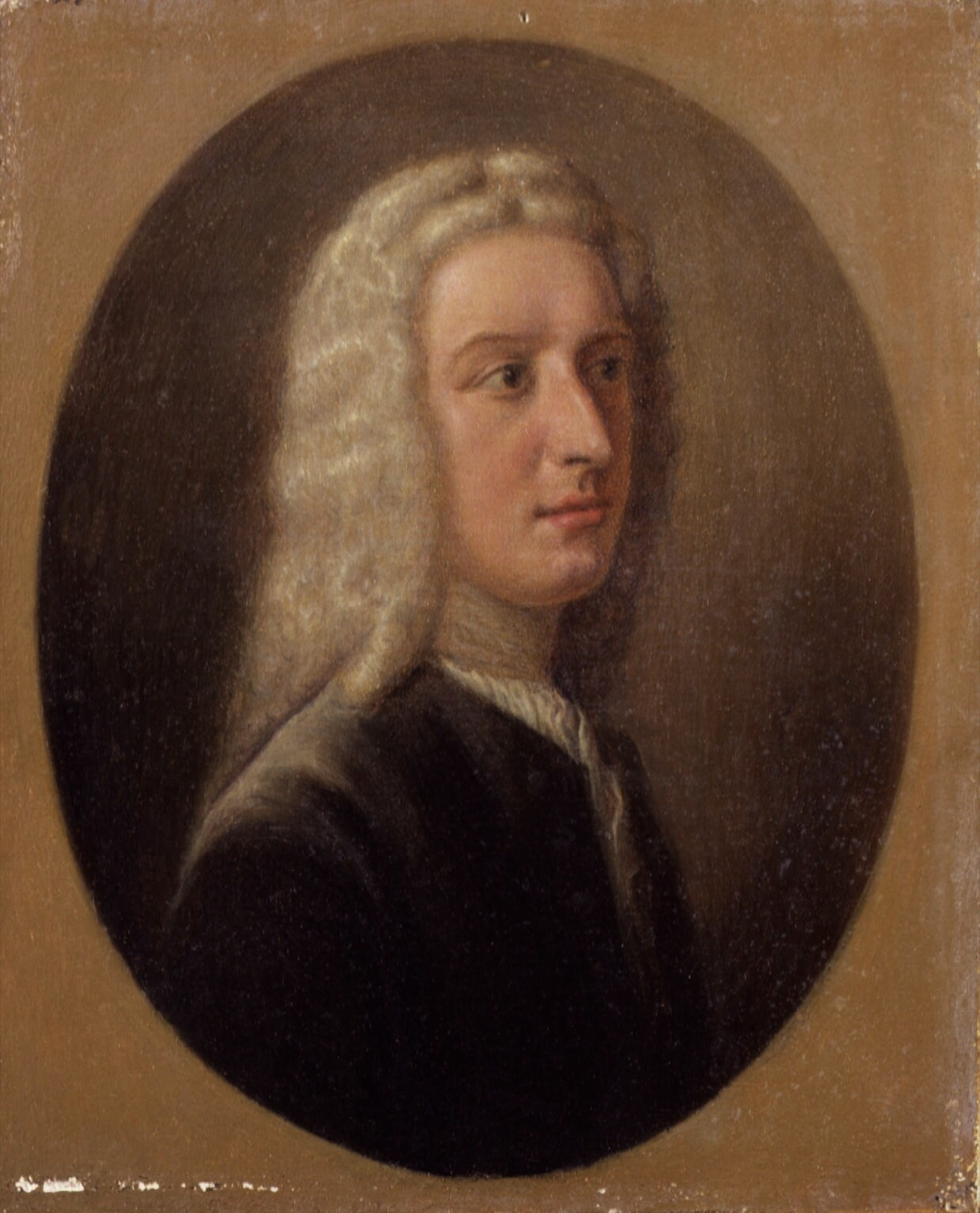
James Oglethorpe

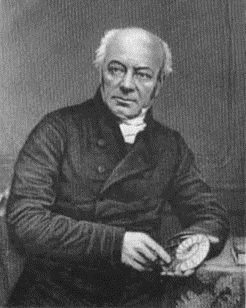
William Buckland

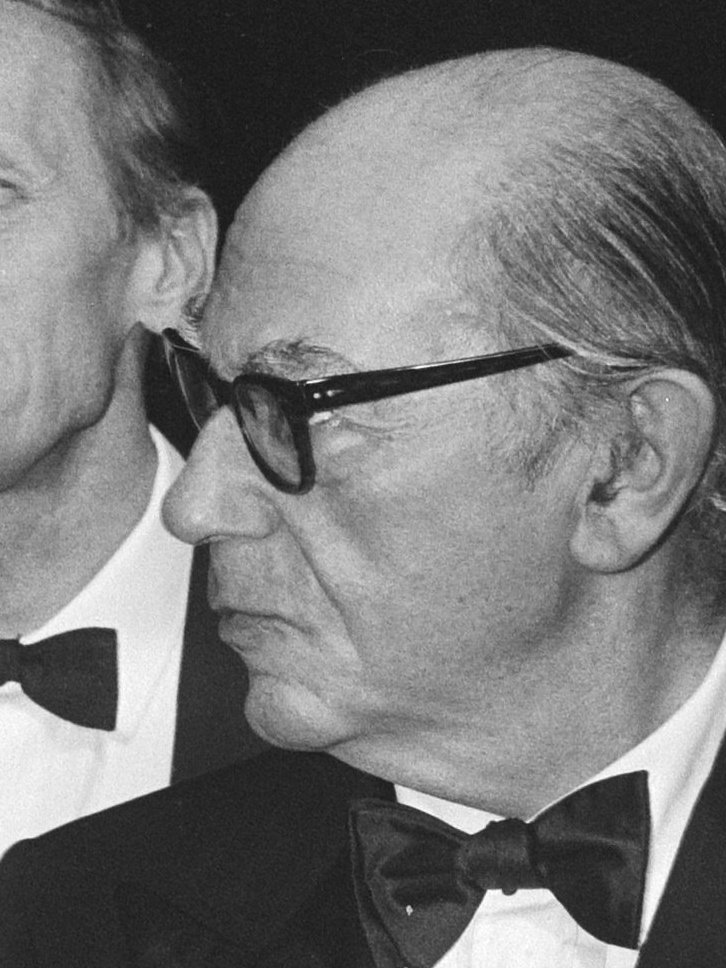
Isaiah Berlin

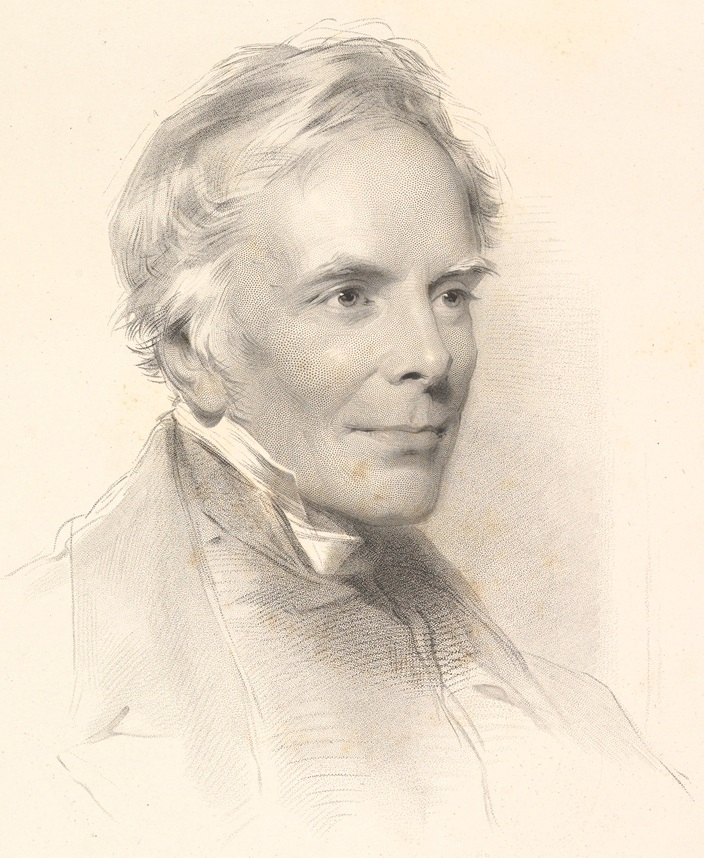
John Keble

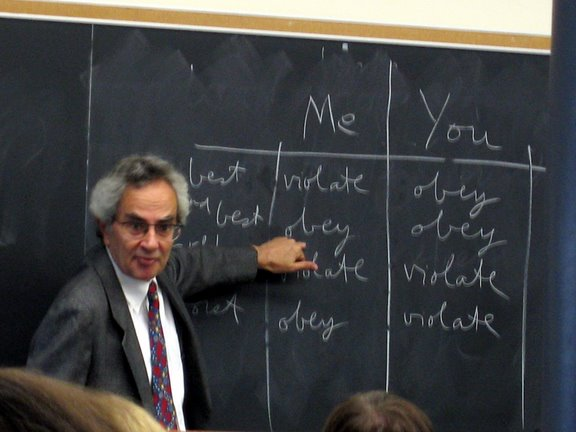
Thomas Nagel

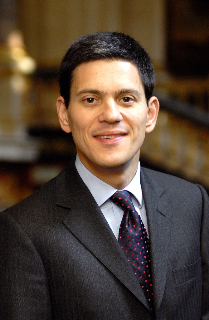
David Miliband

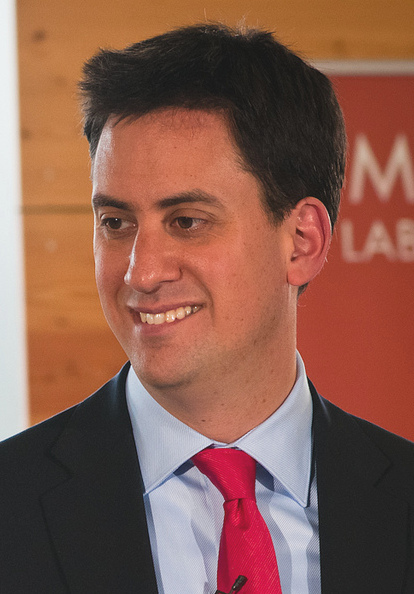
Ed Miliband

Former students of the college include the philosopher Isaiah Berlin, the writer Vikram Seth, the columnist Camilla Long, the financial commentator Martin Wolf, former Leader of the Labour Party Ed Miliband, and former Foreign Secretary David Miliband.

=== Presidents ===
Helen Moore, Associate Professor and Tutor in English, was elected president on 19 October 2018 for a term of two years. Her research focuses on mediaeval and early modern literature; most recently she has researched the reception of foreign texts in English. She has been a fellow at Corpus since 1996.

== Gallery ==
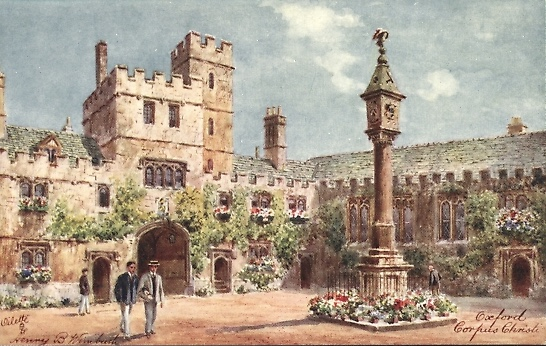
View of the front quad by Henry B. Wimbush, c. 1900

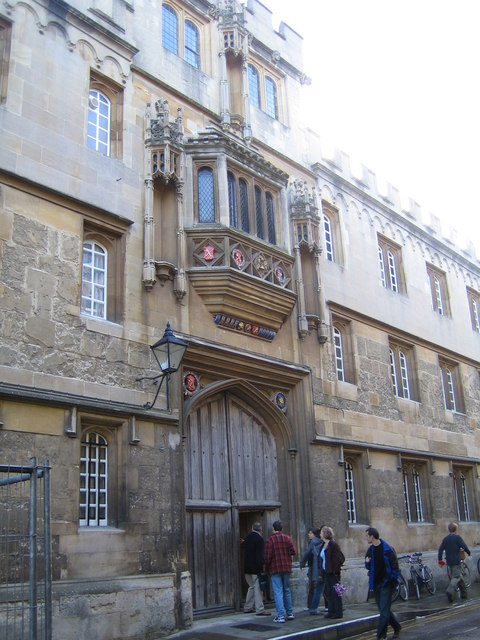
Entrance to the college

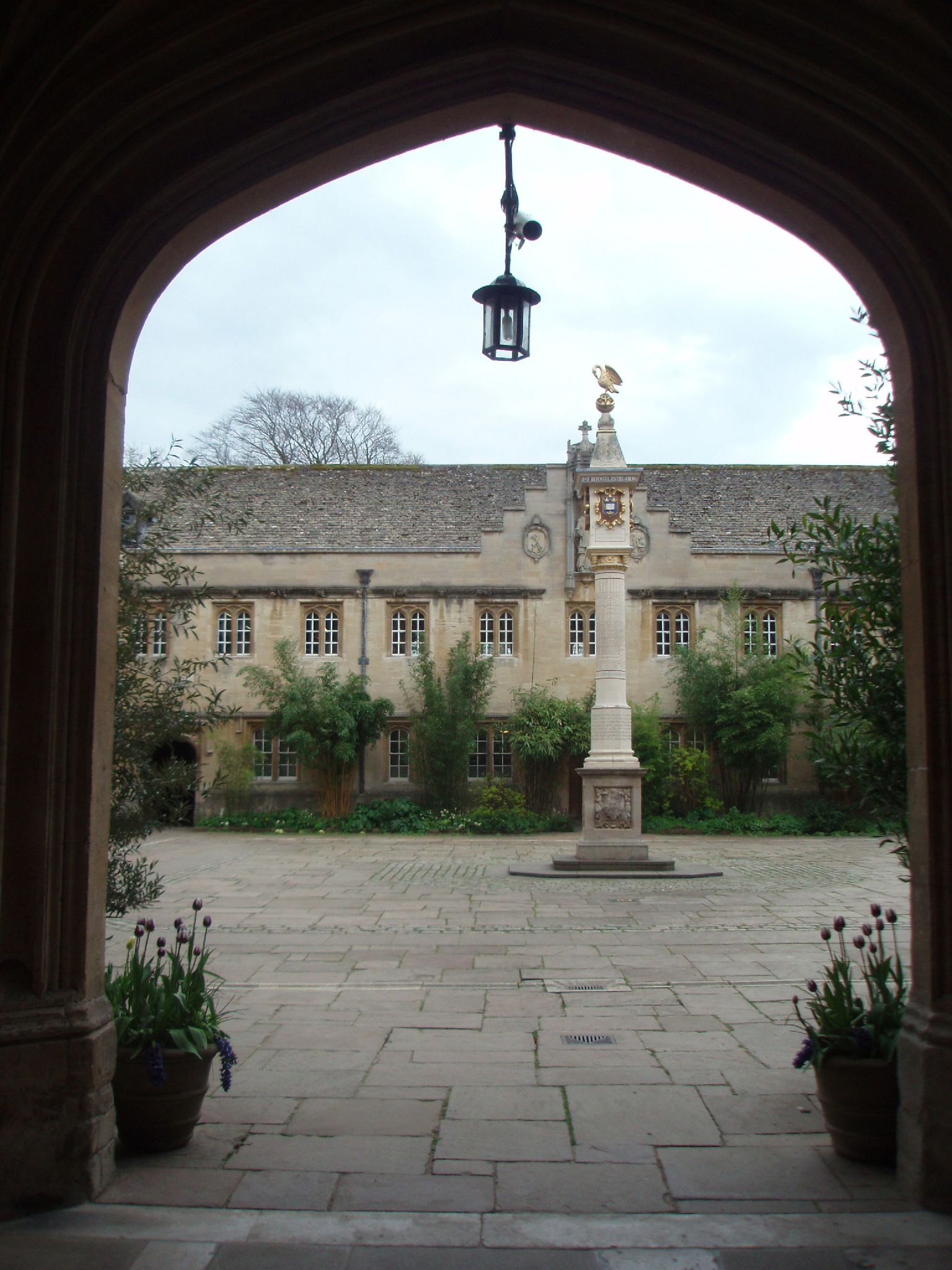
Under the entrance Archway

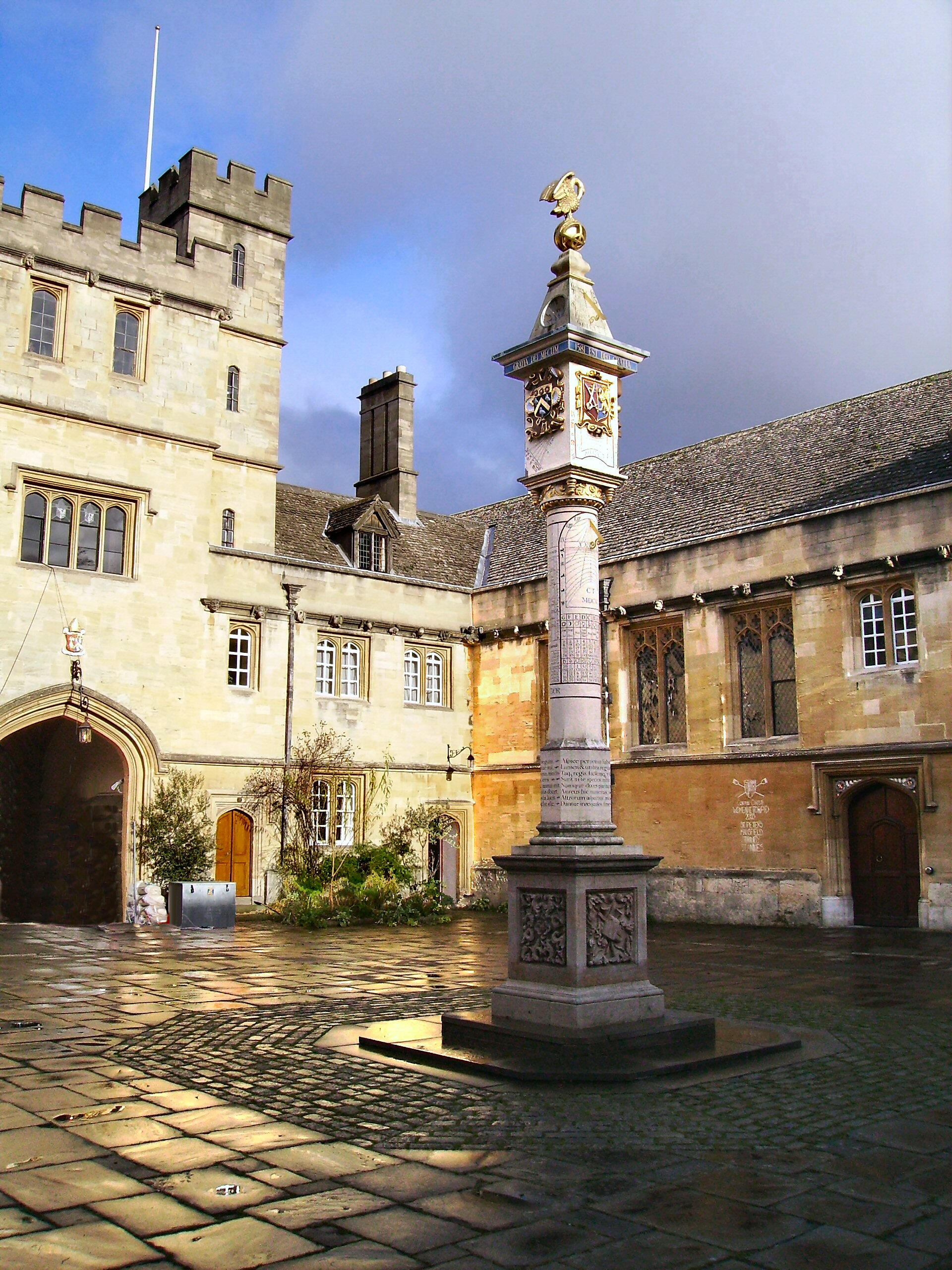
Front Quad

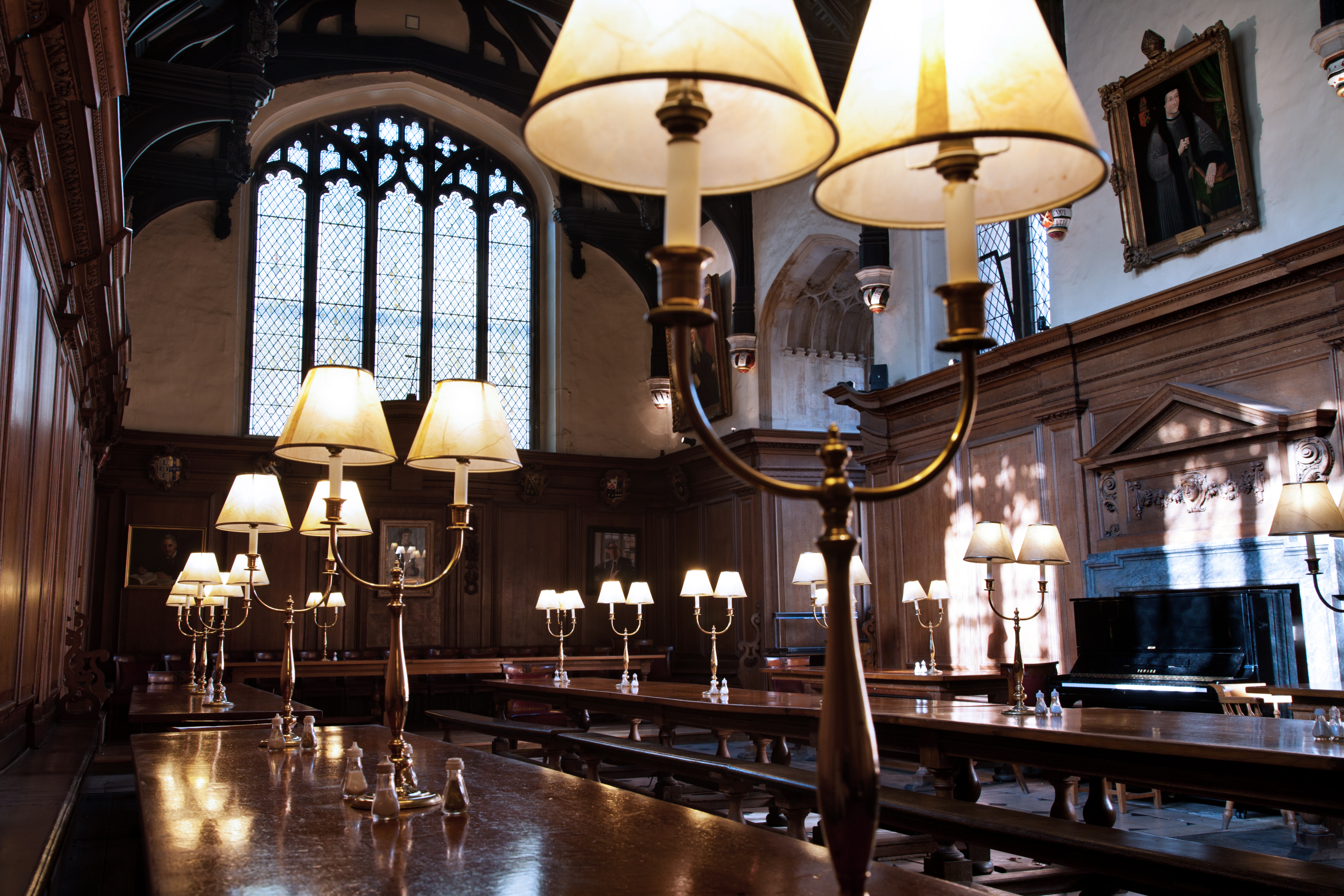
Hall

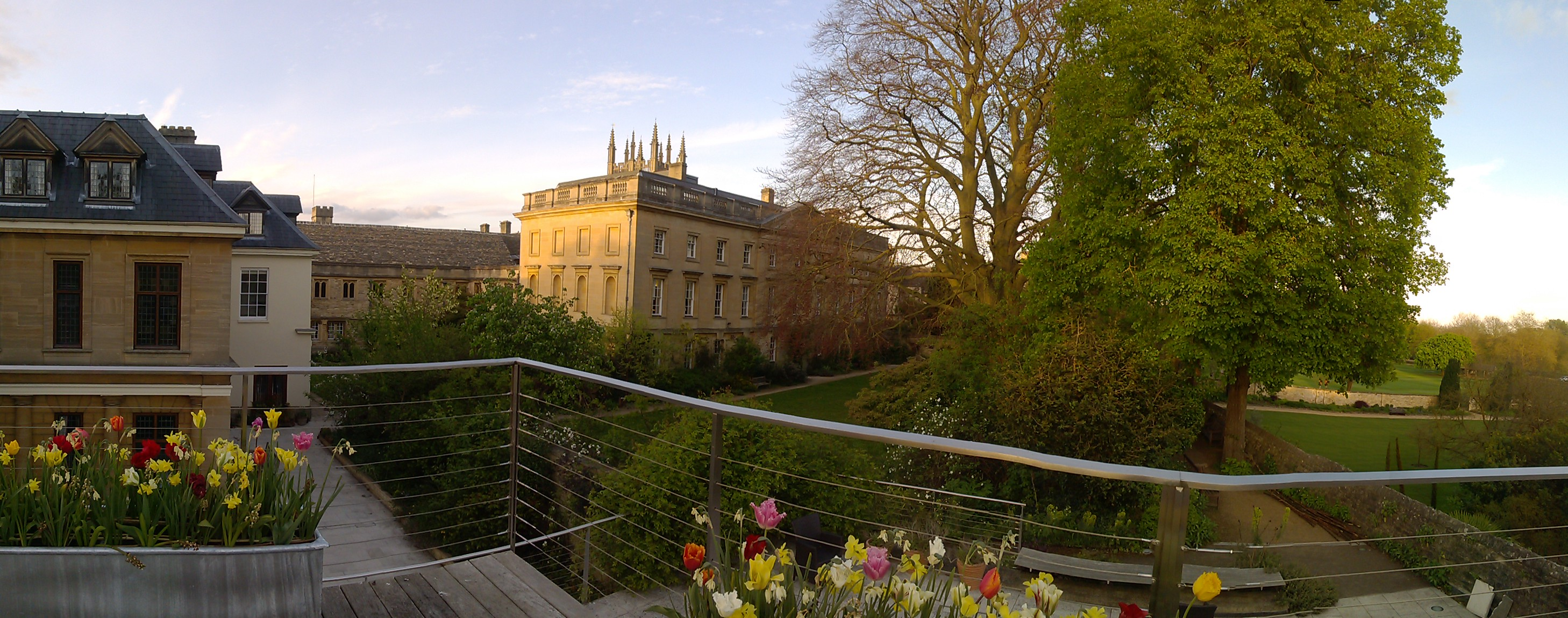
Panoramic view from the Handa Terrace overlooking the main garden
