= List of people associated with Brasenose College, Oxford =

This is a list of notable people associated with Brasenose College, Oxford. Some individuals fall into several categories. They are sorted alphabetically by surname.

This list of notable alumni consists predominantly of men, due to the fact that women first studied at Brasenose as undergraduates in 1974, the college being among the first to go mixed at this point.

== Alumni ==
See also Former students of Brasenose College, Oxford.

=== Politicians and civil servants ===
David Cameron

- Sir Donald Acheson, Chief Medical Officer of the United Kingdom (1983–1991)
- Henry Addington, 1st Viscount Sidmouth Prime Minister of the United Kingdom (1801–1804)
- Sir Tim Barrow, Permanent Representative of the United Kingdom to the European Union
- Mamoun Beheiry, former Sudanese finance minister and governor of the Central Bank of Sudan
- John Brademas, American politician and educator
- John Buchan, 1st Baron Tweedsmuir, Scottish novelist, historian and Unionist politician who served as Governor General of Canada
- David Cameron, Prime Minister of the United Kingdom (2010–2016)
- Kurt M. Campbell, American diplomat and businessman serving as United States Deputy Secretary of State
- Camilla Cavendish, Baroness Cavendish of Little Venice
- Pete Dawkins, Rhodes Scholar, U.S. Army brigadier general, and Republican candidate for Senate
- Stephen Dorrell, British Conservative politician
- John Gorton, Prime Minister of Australia
- Mark Harper, British politician
- Marcia Hutchinson, British politician
- Alyson King, British diplomat and Principal-elect of Brasenose College
- Tanvir Ahmad Khan, former Foreign Secretary of Pakistan
- Bill O'Chee, Australian politician
- Amin Osman, Egyptian politician
- John Profumo, British politician
- Malcolm Turnbull, Prime Minister of Australia
- Melanie Joly, Canadian Minister of Foreign Affairs
- Eylon Levy, Israeli Government Spokesman in the Gaza war
- Sir Herbert Thompson, Indian Civil Service (British India)

=== Judges and lawyers ===
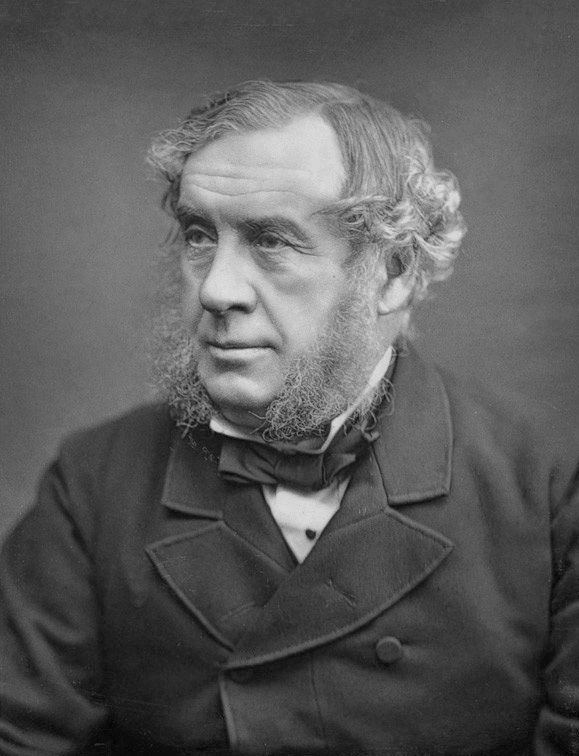
William Robert Grove

- Charles Onyeama, Justice of the Nigerian Supreme Court (1964–67), Judge on the International Court of Justice (1967–76)
- George Baker, President of the Family Division (formerly of the Probate, Divorce and Admiralty Division) of the High Court of Justice, 1971–1979
- Jack Beatson, Lord Justice of Appeal
- Thomas Egerton, 1st Viscount Brackley English nobleman, judge and statesman who served as Lord Keeper and Lord Chancellor
- William Robert Grove, Welsh judge and physical scientist
- William Hulme, 17th-century lawyer and landowner
- Kris Kobach, 31st Secretary of State of Kansas and Republican candidate in the state's 2018 gubernatorial election
- Anthony McCowan, British barrister and judge of the High Court of Justice and Court of Appeal
- Jeremy McMullen, barrister, judge, trade unionist and expert on employment law
- John Mortimer, British barrister, dramatist, screenwriter and author
- John Port, judge
- Leslie Scarman, Baron Scarman, English judge and barrister
- Sir John McIntosh Young AC KCMG, Chief Justice of Victoria (1974-1991)

=== Clergy ===
- Richard Barnes, bishop in the Church of England (1567–1579)
- William Webb Ellis, Anglican clergyman; allegedly the inventor of rugby football whilst a pupil at Rugby School
- The Rt Revd Gordon Mursell, Bishop of Stafford
- George Nichols (martyr), martyr
- John Robinson, English diplomat, Bishop of Bristol and London.
- Robert Runcie, Archbishop of Canterbury, 1980—1991
- Dom Illtyd Trethowan, English priest, philosopher and author
- The Very Reverend Henry Wace, principal of King's College London (1883–1897) and Dean of Canterbury (1903–1924)

=== Military personnel ===
- Douglas Haig, 1st Earl Haig, field marshal, British senior officer during World War I
- Michelle D. Johnson, first female superintendent of the United States Air Force Academy
- Charles Herbert Little, Canadian Director of Naval Intelligence during the Second World War; author
- John S. Grinalds, Marine Corps Major General and 18th President of The Citadel

=== Classicists and archaeologists ===
- Arthur Evans, British archaeologist

=== Historians and antiquarians ===
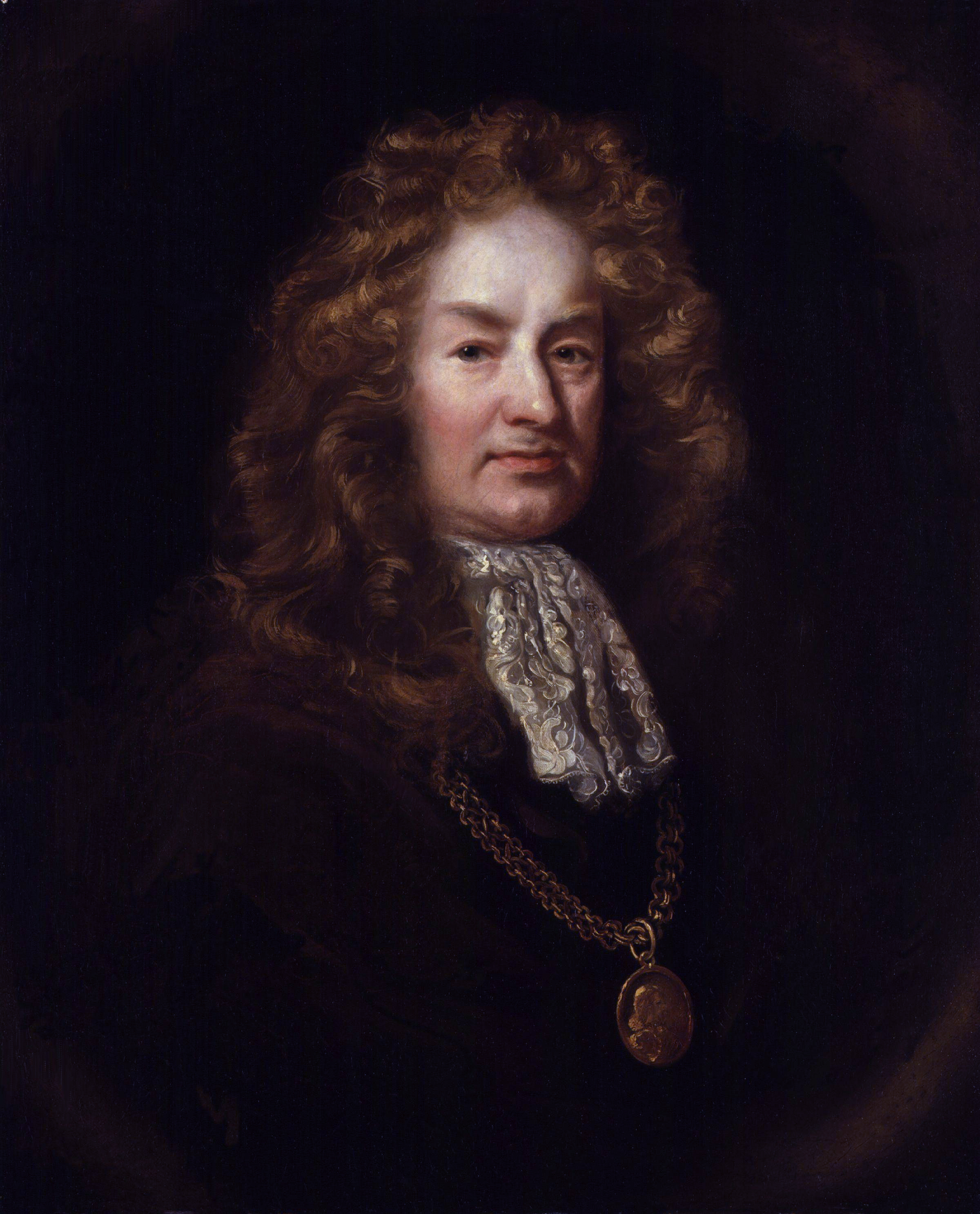
Elias Ashmole

- Elias Ashmole, antiquary, politician, officer of arms, astrologer and student of alchemy
- Colin B. Bailey, art historian
- Rev. Wladislaw Somerville Lach-Szyrma, historian (folklore) and science fiction
- John Robert Martindale, historian, specializing in Roman and Byzantine prosopography
- Robert O'Neill, military theorist and historian
- Tudor Parfitt, historian, orientalist and writer
- G. C. Peden, economic historian

=== Language and literature academics ===
- Robert Burton, scholar at Oxford University
- Francis Pott, Classical languages scholar and Anglican hymnwriter

=== Philosophers and theologians ===
- John Foxe, English historian and martyrologist
- Alexander Nowell, Anglican Puritan theologian and clergyman, served as dean of St Paul's
- David Pearce, Utilitarian philosopher, founder of the World Transhumanist Association
- Orlando E. Toledo Morales, philosopher, historian
- Thomas Traherne, English poet, clergyman, theologian, and religious writer
- Dom Illtyd Trethowan, English priest, philosopher and author
- William Whittingham, English Biblical scholar and religious reformer, dean of Durham

=== Mathematicians, medics and scientists ===
- Colin Clark, economist and statistician
- Paul Frampton, particle phenomenologist
- William Robert Grove, Welsh judge and physical scientist
- Michael Kosterlitz, Nobel Prize winner in Physics
- Graham Richards, head of chemistry at the University of Oxford (1997–2006)
- Richard Robson, Nobel prize winner in Chemistry
- Sir Michael Stratton, third director of the Wellcome Trust Sanger Institute; currently heads the Cancer Genome Project
- Sir Thomas Taylor, chemist and academic administrator

=== Educators ===
- Frank Aydelotte, U.S. educator
- Keith Ingram, former Dragon School headmaster
- Robert Lindgren, president of Randolph-Macon College
- Tim Peto, professor of medicine at the University of Oxford

=== Artists and writers ===
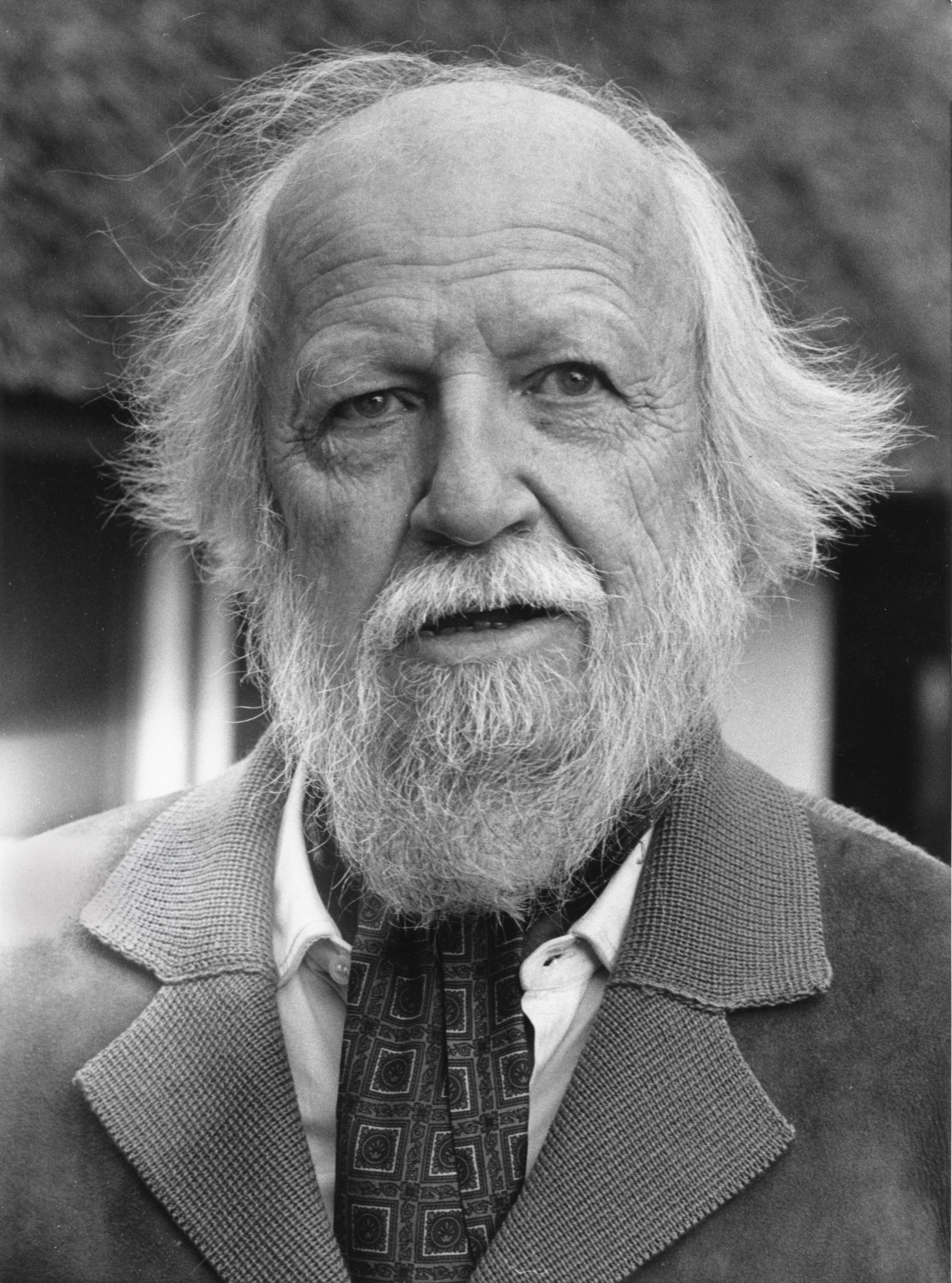
Sir William Golding

- Richard Barham, English cleric of the Church of England, novelist, and humorous poet
- John Buchan, 1st Baron Tweedsmuir, Scottish novelist, historian and Unionist politician, served as Governor General of Canada
- Jessie Burton, author and actress
- Helen DeWitt, novelist
- J. G. Farrell, novelist
- Michael Freeman
- William Golding, English novelist, poet, playwright and Nobel Prize in Literature laureate
- Tim Harford, economist and journalist
- David Langford, science fiction writer
- John Marston
- Simon Mawer, English writer
- Grace McCleen, novelist
- George Monbiot, English writer
- Sir John Mortimer, British barrister, dramatist, screenwriter and author
- Rev. James Noyes, Puritan scholar and author; founder of Newbury, Massachusetts
- Rolfe Arnold Scott-James, literary critic
- David Szalay, novelist
- Sarah Vaughan, writer and journalist
- William Edward Vickers (Roy Vickers), English mystery writer
- Sara Wheeler, English travel writer and biographer
- Toby Young, British journalist
- Henry Zeffman, political journalist

=== Broadcasters and entertainers ===
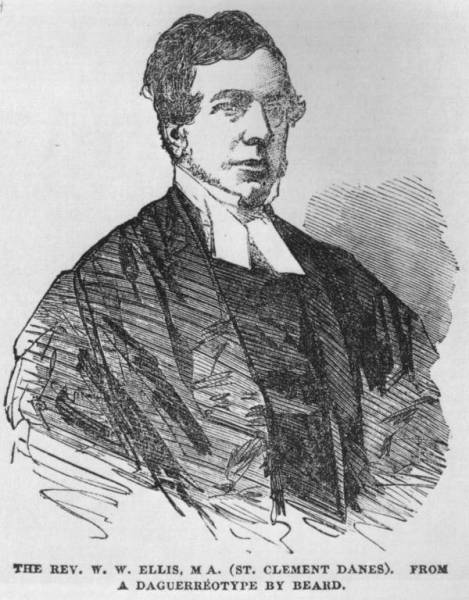
William Webb Ellis, allegedly the inventor of rugby football

- Wilton Barnhardt, former reporter for Sports Illustrated; author
- Laura Corcoran, member of musical comedy cabaret double act
- Michael Palin, comedian, actor, writer and television presenter
- Mark Williams, actor
- Will Macdonald, television producer, executive and writer

=== Musicians ===
- Mylo (Myles MacInnes), Scottish electronic musician and record producer

=== Sports people ===
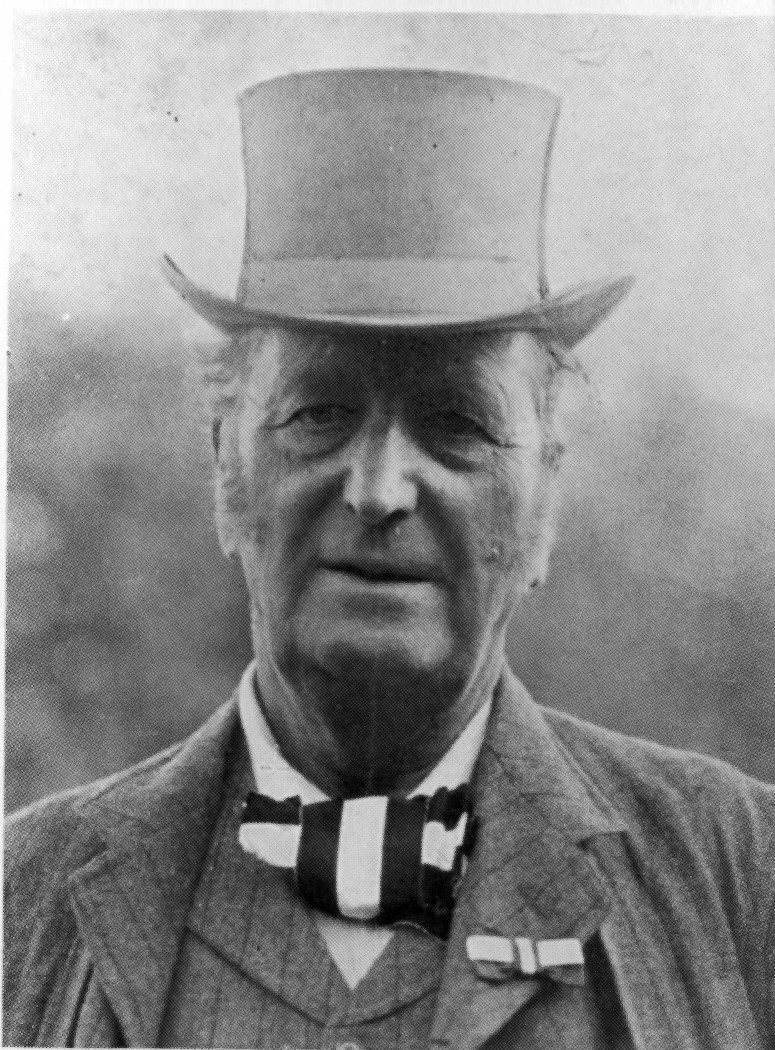
Walter Woodgate, Boat Race winner, eight-time Henley Regatta champion and inventor of the coxless four

- Wilfred Bleaden, 1908 Olympic athlete
- Brian Boobbyer, rugby union and cricketer
- John Cherry, rower who competed at the 1936 Summer Olympics
- Colin Cowdrey, cricketer
- William Webb Ellis, Anglican clergyman; allegedly the inventor of rugby football whilst a pupil at Rugby School
- Tom Edwards-Moss, rower who competed in the Boat Race four times and twice won the Diamond Challenge Sculls; later a Conservative politician
- James Fulton, cricketer
- Arnold Jackson, British athlete 1912 Olympic 1500m gold medallist, Army Officer (DSO with Three Bars) and barrister
- Prince Alexander Obolensky, represented England in International Rugby Union
- Cuthbert Ottaway, first captain of the England football team
- Edward Shaw, cricketer and British Army officer
- Han Willhoft-King, footballer
- Walter Bradford Woodgate, Boat Race winner and multiple-time Henley Royal Regatta champion

=== Other people in public life ===
- Kate Allen, Director of Amnesty International UK (AIUK)
- Mamoun Beheiry, economist, first commissioner of the Bank of Sudan and first president of the African Development Bank
- Andrew Feldman, Baron Feldman of Elstree
- Camilla Cavendish, Baroness Cavendish of Little Venice
- Martin Fiennes, venture capitalist and peer
- Denys Finch Hatton, aristocratic big-game hunter
- Robin Janvrin, Baron Janvrin, Private Secretary to Queen Elizabeth II (1999—2007)
- Bruce Kent, British political activist and former Roman Catholic priest
- Andrew Lindsay, former Olympic gold medal-winning rower at the 2000 Summer Olympics and CEO of Telecom Plus
- Philip Moore, Baron Moore of Wolvercote, Private Secretary to the Sovereign (1977–1986)
- Paul Pester, CEO of TSB Bank
- Amanda Pullinger, Philanthropist
- Guy Spier, Investor
- Philip Yea, British businessman and private equity investor

== Fellows and Principals ==
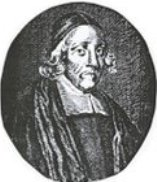
The Rev. Thomas Adams

- J. L. Ackrill, Emeritus Professor of the History of Philosophy
- Richard Adams, theologian
- The Rev. Thomas Adams, English academic and theological writer
- John Anderson, Camden Professor of Ancient History (1927–1936)
- Konstantin Ardakov, mathematician
- John Barnard, supporter of James II of England
- Richard Barnes, Bishop in the Church of England (1567–1579)
- John Barnston, divine
- Llewellyn John Montfort Bebb, British academic, Principal of St David's College (1898–1915)
- The Rt. Rev. James Bell, Bishop of Knaresborough
- Bryan John Birch, British mathematician
- Peter Birks, Regius Professor of Civil Law
- Vernon Bogdanor, Research Professor at the Institute for Contemporary British History at King's College London
- Robert Bolton, clergyman and academic
- The Rt. Hon. George Bowen, British author and colonial administrator
- Gerard Baldwin Brown, art historian
- Peter Brunt, ancient historian at Oxford University
- Arthur Chandler, Bishop of Bloemfontein, Chaplin
- Ralph Churton, churchman
- Richard Cooper, Professor of French at the Faculty of Medieval and Modern Languages, University of Oxford
- Jonathan Culler, Professor of English at Cornell University
- George Edmundson, clergyman and academic historian
- Sos Eltis, Fellow and tutor in English of Brasenose College, author
- Russell G. Foster, Professor of Circadian Neuroscience

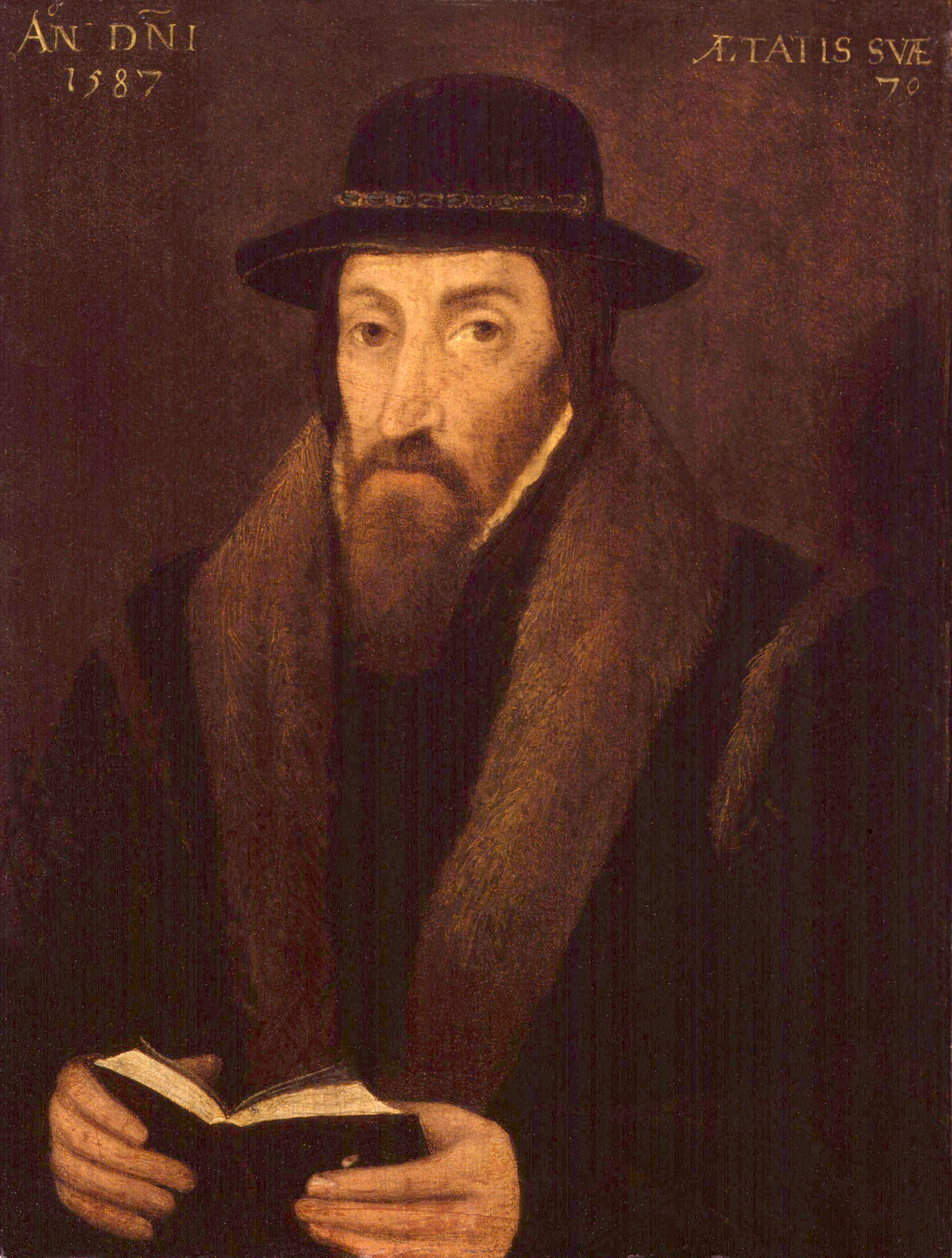
John Foxe

- John Foxe, English historian and martyrologist
- John Freeman, retired British politician, diplomat and broadcaster
- James Garbett, Archdeacon of Chichester
- Reginald Halse, Archbishop of Brisbane
- Francis J. Haverfield, British historian and archaeologist
- Douglas Higgs, researcher at the Weatherall Institute of Molecular Medicine at the University of Oxford
- Jonathan A. Jones, University lecturer in atomic and laser physics at Oxford University
- Kurt Josten, curator of the Museum of the History of Science, Oxford
- Harry Judge, Senior Research Fellow at the Department of Education

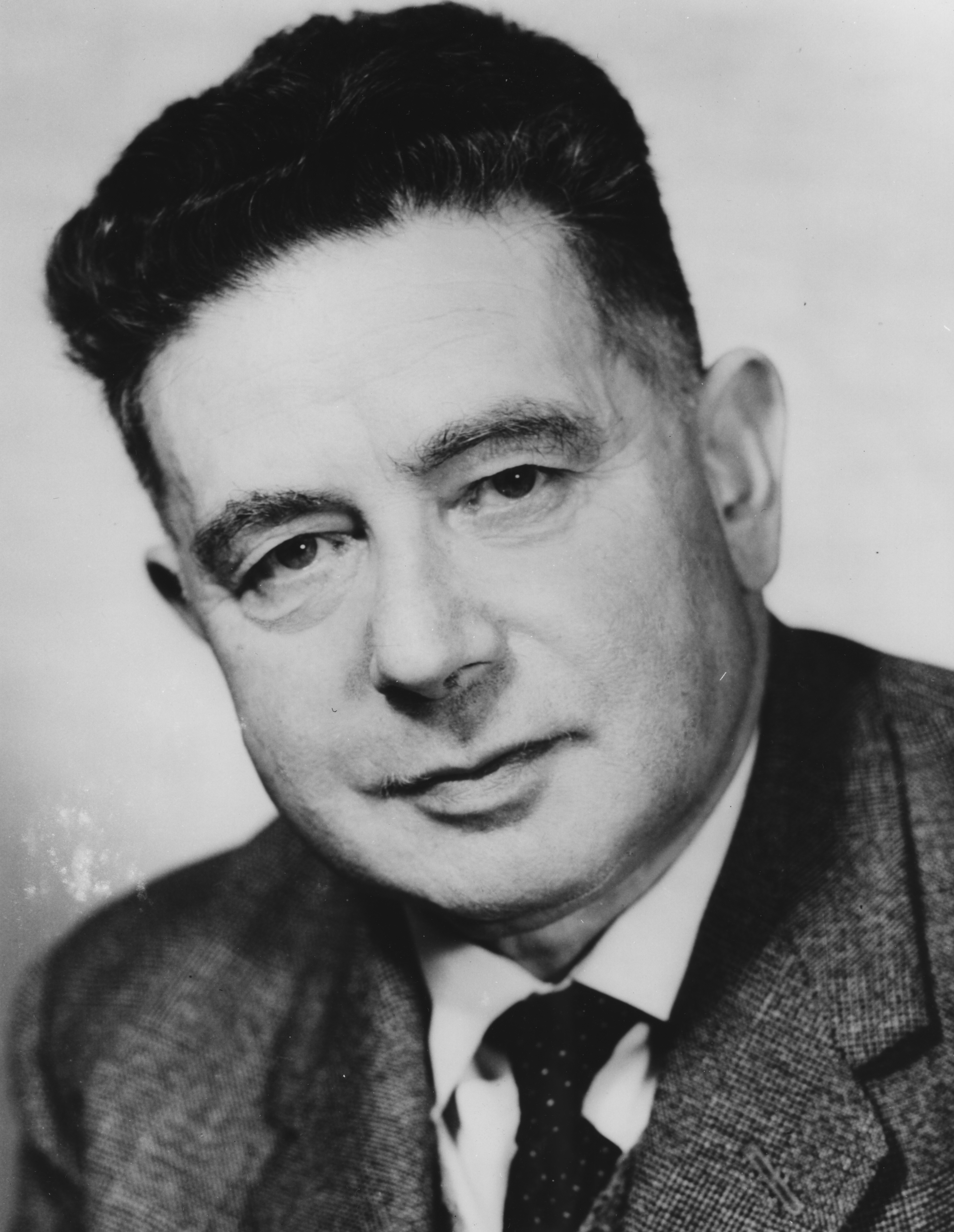
Sir Otto Kahn-Freund

- Otto Kahn-Freund, professor of comparative law, University of Oxford
- Nicholas Kurti, physicist
- Falconer Madan, librarian of the Bodleian Library
- Fergus Millar, British historian and Camden Professor of Ancient History
- Reginald Owen, Archbishop of New Zealand (1952—1960)
- Simon Palfrey, English scholar at Oxford University
- Walter Pater, English essayist, critic of art and literature, and writer of fiction
- Henry Francis Pelham, English scholar and historian
- William Petty, English economist, scientist and philosopher
- Edward Hayes Plumptre, English divine and scholar
- Leighton Durham Reynolds, British classicist and Emeritus Professor of Classical Languages and Literature
- Samuel Harvey Reynolds, divine
- Graham Richards, Head of Chemistry (1997–2006) at the University of Oxford
- Gareth Roberts, Welsh physicist
- Arthur William Rucker, physicist

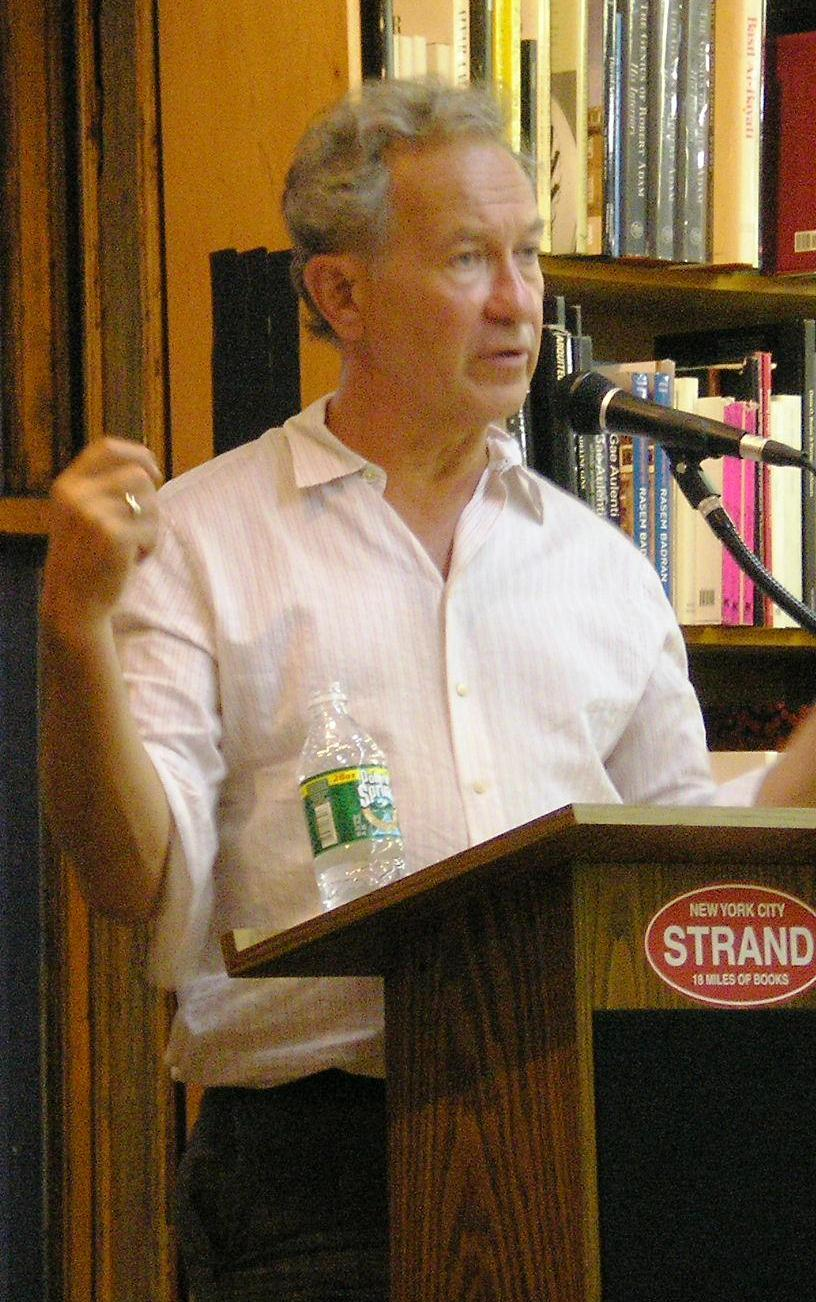
Simon Schama

- Simon Schama, British historian and art historian
- Robert Shackleton, English French language philologist and librarian
- Peter J. N. Sinclair, Professor in Economics at the University of Birmingham
- Richard V. Southwell, British mathematician
- Ronald Syme, historian and classicist
- D. R. Thorpe, biographer of three British Prime Ministers
- John Wain, former professor of Poetry, Oxford
- Thomas Humphry Ward, English author and journalist
- Geoffrey Warnock, philosopher and Vice-Chancellor
- Lawrence Washington, English rector
- Francis Willis, physician and clergyman
- The Rt. Rev. John Wordsworth, English prelate

=== Principals ===
The current principal is John Bowers. The principal-elect is Brasenose alumna Alyson King.

== Honorary Fellows ==
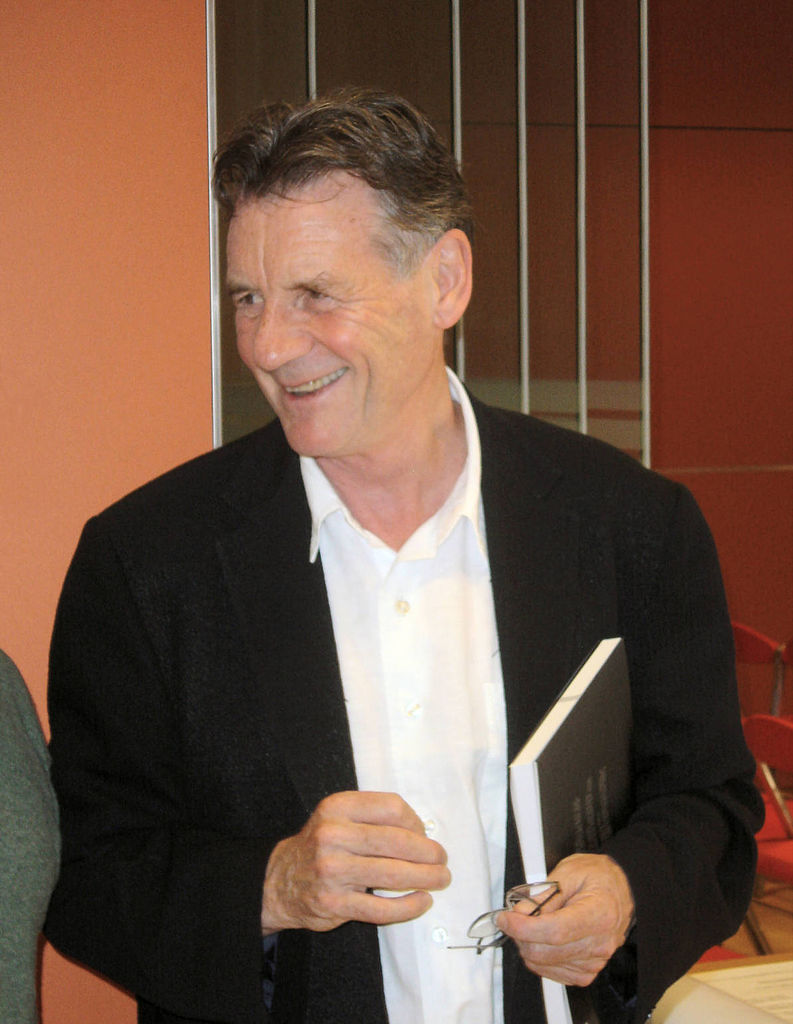
Michael Palin

- Donald Acheson, Chief Medical Officer of the United Kingdom (1983–1991)
- Kate Allen, Director of Amnesty International UK (AIUK)
- George Baker, President of the Family Division (formerly of the Probate, Divorce and Admiralty Division) of the High Court of Justice
- Dominic Barton, Ugandan-born Canadian management consultant
- John Brademas, Greek American politician and educator
- David Cameron, Prime Minister of the United Kingdom
- John Gorton, Prime Minister of Australia
- Erwin Hahn, American physicist, Wolf Prize in Physics (1983/4)
- Catharine Bond Hill, former president of Vassar College
- Robin Janvrin, Baron Janvrin, Private Secretary to Queen Elizabeth II (February 1999 to September 2007)
- Michelle D. Johnson, Lieutenant General in the United States Air Force and Superintendent of the United States Air Force Academy
- Bruce Kent, British political activist
- John Mortimer, English barrister, dramatist, screenwriter and author
- Michael Palin, comedian, actor, writer and television presenter
- Leslie Scarman, Baron Scarman
- Francis James Wylie, first Warden of Rhodes House

== Other persons associated with Brasenose ==
- Jeffrey Archer
- Eleanor Parker, British historian and medievalist.
