= William Hulme's Grammar School =

Coordinates: 53.446°N 2.248°W

Location
- Spring Bridge Road; Manchester, M16 8PR; England

Information
- Type: Comprehensive; Academy
- Motto: Fide Sed Cui Vide (Latin: "Trust but watch whom you trust") (pun on whom/Hulme)
- Established: 1887
- Founder: William Hulme
- Department for Education URN: 135296 Tables
- Ofsted: Reports
- Chairman of Governors: Jenny Andrews
- Principal: Kate Heaton
- Heads of School: Thom Copestake & Leigh Dalton
- Gender: Coeducational (pre-1987, all boys)
- Age: 3 (pre-1997, 11) to 18
- Enrolment: 1600
- Houses: Pankhurst , Johnson , Turing , Bell
- Colours: Claret, Navy and Straw
- Publication: The Hulmeian (annual magazine), Billboard (quarterly magazine), WHGS (weekly news magazine)
- School Song: The Hulme Song/Jerusalem
- (Ex) Pupils: (Old) Hulmeians
- Website: http://www.whgs-academy.org/

William Hulme's Grammar School is a coeducational all-through comprehensive school in Whalley Range, Manchester, England.

== History ==
William Hulme (1631–1691) of Hulme Hall, Stockport, was the founder of "Hulme's Charity" later known as the Hulme Trust. Following the premature death of his son, he left provision for the foundation of exhibitions for four students to study for Bachelor of Arts degrees at Brasenose College in Oxford. The income for this charity was originally £64, which came from rents and dues on his many outlying properties. Over the years, this sum grew so much that on several occasions it was necessary to extend the scope of his bequest. In 1881, the Trustees of his charity were empowered to build schools in Manchester, Oldham and Bury.

The Manchester school was founded on 26 January 1887 as a grammar school. Originally named The Hulme Grammar School, in 1939 it changed its name to William Hulme's Grammar School. Until 1975 it was a direct grant school; when this scheme was abolished, it chose to become independent.

In 2006, the school announced that it was joining the state sector, abolishing all tuition fees and selection. It applied for and gained academy status, making it more independent than most state schools by allowing for the selection of up to 10% of students based on aptitude in foreign languages. It is the first member of the Headmasters' and Headmistresses' Conference of top independent schools to opt into the state sector.

== Buildings ==
=== Old Building ===
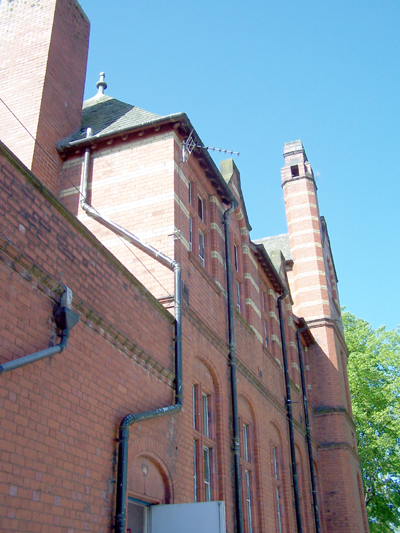
The north face of the Old Building looking towards the front of the School

The original part of the school was designed by A. H. Davies-Colley in 1886–1887 as a large, high (up to four storeys) building of red brick and yellow terracotta. There is a hall of c.1910 in the same style. Both buildings are symmetrical. The building lies on top of a large tunnel network. In the original building, there is a ground floor hall surrounded by balconies on many levels. The main staircase is opposed by large stained glass windows. The basement level was refurbished on one side in 2007 in order to allow lessons to be held in two small classrooms. At the front of the school in the basement are the staff changing rooms and medical centre.

The stage of the main hall lies opposite the hall entrance, above which are a number of oil paintings of previous headmasters. A portrait of Patriarca was commissioned in 2008. Around the oak-panelled walls of the hall are boards bearing the names of old boys who have been awarded Scholarships or Exhibitions to Oxford or Cambridge, long serving teachers and all past headmasters. Above these are numerous house flags and shields. On the west wall is the stage staff balcony. Beneath the balcony is the organ. There is also a fairly new grand piano which is frequently used for public concerts and recitals. Beneath the main hall was originally the changing rooms but is now the music department which is equipped with an older grand piano in the rehearsal studio, along with several upright pianos and a number of computers and keyboards.

=== Harris House, Hardraw ===
The school, through the J.G. Bird Trust, owned a former school and attached headmaster's house in the village of Hardraw, near Hawes, Wensleydale. School parties frequented this listed building, known as Harris House, to take part in outdoor pursuits. Built in 1875, it closed as a school in the 1960s and was bought by WHGS, which at the time owned several centres similar to but smaller than this. The centre was known as Hulme House until 1993, when W. C. Harris, an Old Hulmeian, left £50,000 in his will for the renovation of the property. The house was then renamed after its principal benefactor. Harris House has now been sold and is now a holiday let.

== School life ==
=== Combined Cadet Force ===
Towards the end of their second year (Year 8), the dwindling majority of pupils will join the voluntary CCF (the "Corps"). Uniform is issued and cadets accompany the Contingent on a field day in June and, if they wish, summer camp. They train once a week at school, following syllabuses which lead to promotion and qualifications.

Cadets join either the Army (Duke of Lancaster's Regiment) or the RAF Section, which is currently non-operational, both of which are officered by teachers, after which a minimum of five terms' service is expected. They may then choose to continue as NCOs in the Sixth Form, during which time they undergo more advanced training and assist in instructing the younger cadets. The Corps meets weekly and takes part in a field day each term. There are summer and Easter camps.

=== Music ===
A concert band/orchestra plays in several concerts each year along with the choir, jazz band and samba band.

=== Sports ===
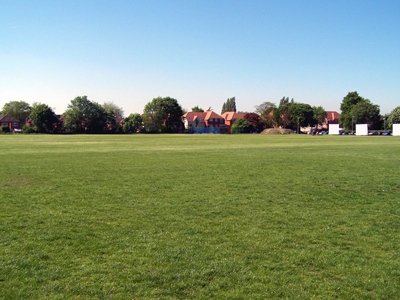
The first XI cricket pitch

Weekly fixtures are played against other local schools and clubs; for example, the cricket 1st XI have an annual fixture vs. the Marylebone Cricket Club.

== Notable former pupils ==
- Andrew Bennett, former Labour MP for Denton
- Claude Blair, museum curator
- Kim Booth, politician
- Peter Butterworth, actor
- John Doyle, drummer with Magazine
- Anthony Dyson, Anglican priest and academic
- Leslie Haden-Guest, 1st Baron Haden-Guest, doctor and Labour MP
- James Hickman, swimmer
- Michael Platt, rugby league player
- Andy Hinchcliffe, footballer
- Derek Leckenby (1943–1994), lead guitarist of Herman's Hermits
- John Lee, Baron Lee of Trafford, Conservative MP and Liberal Democrat politician
- Ivan Lewis, MP for Bury South since 1997 and former Minister.
- Michael Lord, Baron Framlingham, Second Deputy Chairman of Ways and Means and Conservative MP
- Sir Robert Mark, Commissioner of the Metropolitan Police
- Jeremy McMullen, judge, trade unionist and expert on employment law
- Rob Munro, Bishop
- Colin Touchin, conductor, composer and music educator
- Ashley Ward, footballer
- Thomas William Warnes, gastroenterologist
- John Haggie, Newfoundland health minister

== See also ==
- Listed buildings in Manchester-M16
- William Hulme
- Hulme Trust
- Hulme Grammar School, Oldham
