= Hulme Trust =

Educational charity

- Formation: 1691
- Registration no.: 532297
- Legal status: Charity
- Purpose: Education
- Location: United Kingdom
- Region served: England
- Main organ: Board of Trustees

The Hulme Trust (also known as "Hulme’s Charity") is an educational trust and charity (No. 532297) founded in 1691 by the bequest of the English lawyer and landowner William Hulme (c.1631–91).

== History ==
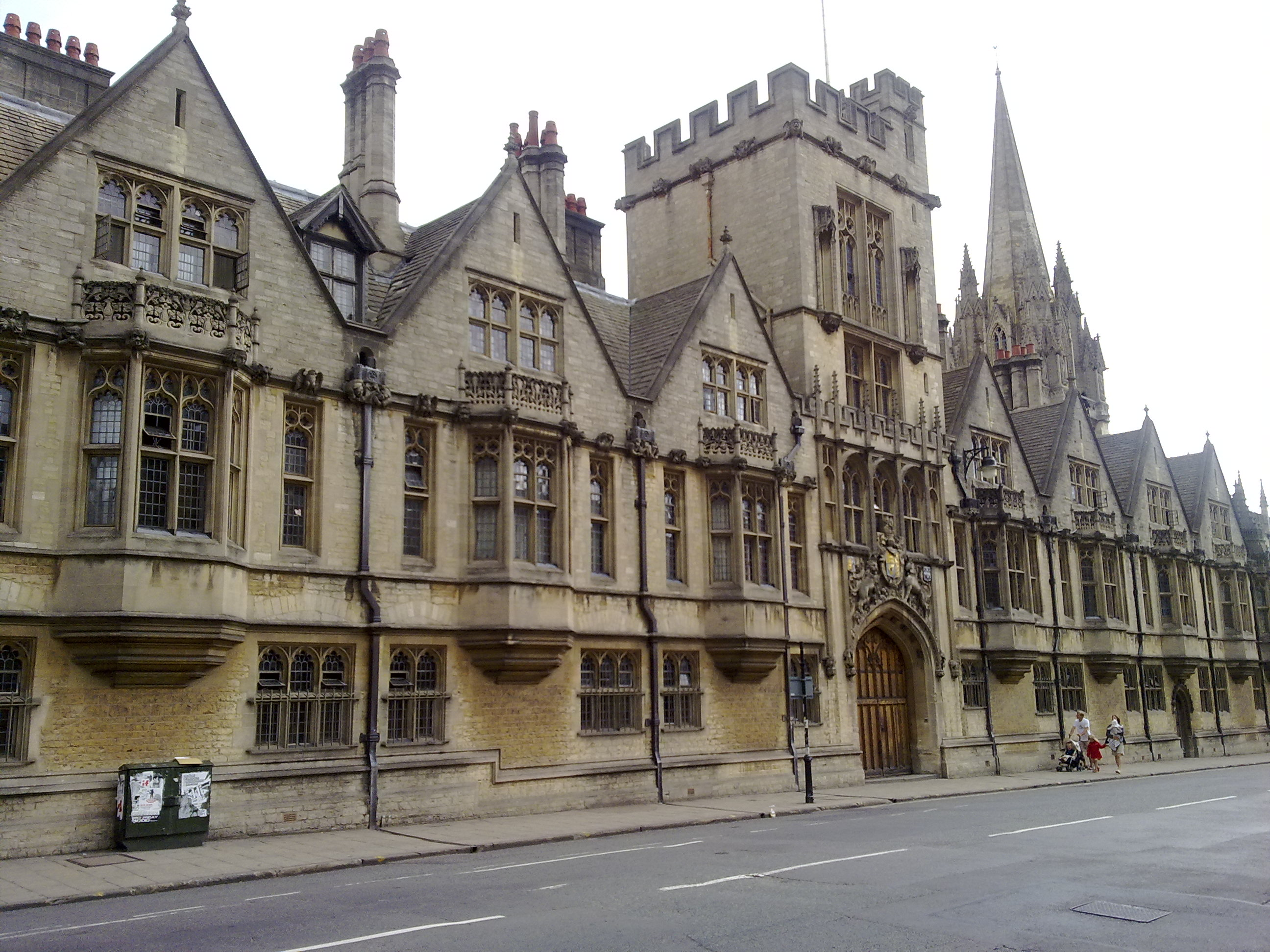
Brasenose College, Oxford on High Street with St Mary's in the background

With his only son, Banaster Hulme (1658–73) having died at the age of 15, William Hulme left his property to his wife and after her death to be held in trust forming “Hulme’s Charity”.

The Trust was to use the money for educational purposes: Hulmeian Exhibitions were established at Brasenose College, Oxford to support four poor students through their studies and for four years after graduation. The trustees determined that the exhibitions should be limited to the sons of Lancashire clergy. The first Exhibitioners were chosen in 1692. As the wealth of the trust increased through profitable property investments, several Acts of Parliament allowed the Trustees to spend the money on other purposes so the number of Exhibitioners was increased and a lectureship in Divinity was established at Brasenose College, Oxford.

In 1827, the Trust was allowed to begin purchasing Anglican benefices and bought 28 in total (with 21 in Lancashire alone). The Trust was also allowed to build and provide funds for church repairs. These purchases proved controversial, with some regarding feeling the trust was being misused.

In 1881, the Trust was reorganised. It was to provide eight Senior and twelve Junior Exhibitioners at Brasenose College, Oxford and annual sums to Hulme Hall – a hall of residence for Anglican students in Owens College (then the only constituent college of the University of Manchester). It was also to provide an annual sum to Owen's College, Manchester itself. Hulme Hall was to award twenty scholarships and other scholarships were to be funded at Owen's College, with an annual sum to fund Professors of Classical/English Literature or Ancient/Modern History, and two Hulme Scholarships from 1893.

The Charity Commissioners empowered the Trust to use its funds to establish and endow schools – it established, in Manchester, William Hulme's Grammar School (in 1887), re-founded the existing Oldham Grammar School as Hulme Grammar School, in 1887, and funded new buildings for the existing school Bury Grammar School. Scholarships were also created to allow students from these schools to study at Brasenose College, Oxford. Further grants were given to Manchester High School for Girls, Manchester Grammar School, Pendleton High School for Girls and to re-establish the existing Queen Elizabeth Grammar School, Middleton.

== Trustees ==
Many of the Trustees have been important figures and some of these have included:

- Sir Ralph Assheton, 1st Baronet
- Ralph Assheton, 1st Baron Clitheroe
- James Barry, 4th Earl of Barrymore
- Sir Roger Bradshaigh, 3rd Baronet
- Reverend John Clowes
- Richard Cross, 1st Viscount Cross
- Arthur Egerton, 3rd Earl of Wilton
- Francis Egerton, 1st Earl of Ellesmere
- Thomas Egerton, 1st Earl of Wilton
- Thomas Egerton, 2nd Earl of Wilton
- Wilbraham Egerton, 1st Earl Egerton
- William Egerton, 1st Baron Egerton
- George Grey, 6th Earl of Stamford
- Sir William Henry Houldsworth, 1st Baronet
- Sir Clement Royds
- Edward Smith-Stanley, 12th Earl of Derby
- Edward Smith-Stanley, 13th Earl of Derby
- Edward Smith-Stanley, 14th Earl of Derby
- James Smith-Stanley, Lord Strange
- Le Gendre Starkie
- Robert Townley Parker
- George Warren, 2nd Baron de Tabley
- John Wilson-Patten, 1st Baron Winmarleigh

== See also ==
- William Hulme
- Hulme Hall, University of Manchester
- William Hulme's Grammar School, Manchester
- Hulme Grammar School, Oldham
- Manchester Grammar School
- Manchester High School for Girls
- Bury Grammar School

== Bibliography ==
- "Hulme, William" . Dictionary of National Biography. London: Smith, Elder & Co. 1885–1900.
- Rack, Henry (2004). "Hulme, William (bap. 1631, d. 1691)". Oxford Dictionary of National Biography. Oxford Dictionary of National Biography (online ed.). Oxford University Press. doi:10.1093/ref:odnb/14118. (Subscription, Wikipedia Library access or UK public library membership required.)
- Fallows, I. B. (2001). Bury Grammar School: A History, c.1570 to 1976. Altrincham: Bury Grammar School.
- Fallows, I. B. (2008). William Hulme and his Trust. Chichester: Phillimore. ISBN 9781860775352.
- Hargreaves, W. (1879). Spoliation of Hulme's Charity. Manchester: John Heywood.
