= Stotts Tours =

Closed bus company

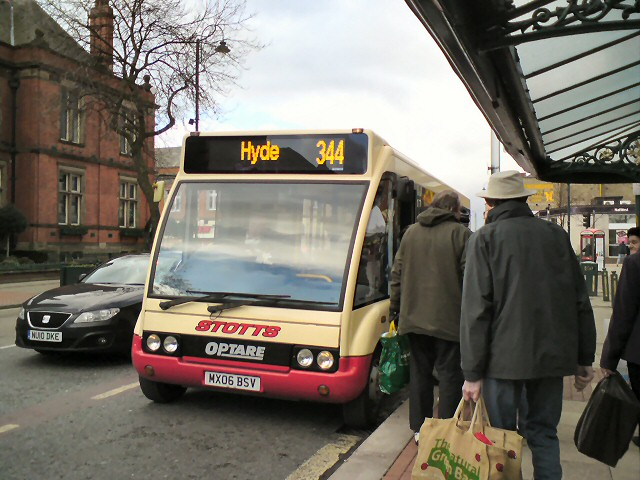
- Optare Solo on service 344 in Hyde in January 2012
- Founded: 25 April 1963
- Ceased operation: 4 January 2025
- Headquarters: Oldham
- Service area: Oldham; Ashton; Saddleworth
- Routes: 25 (July 2024)
- Depots: 2

Stotts Tours (Oldham) Limited, trading as Stotts, was a bus operator in Oldham, Greater Manchester, formed in 1963. Stotts operated mostly contracted services on behalf of Transport for Greater Manchester around Oldham and Ashton-Under-Lyne.

A similarly named Stotts Coaches, based in Milnsbridge, was also formed in 1984 by members of the same family; however, there was no relationship between the two companies.

== History ==
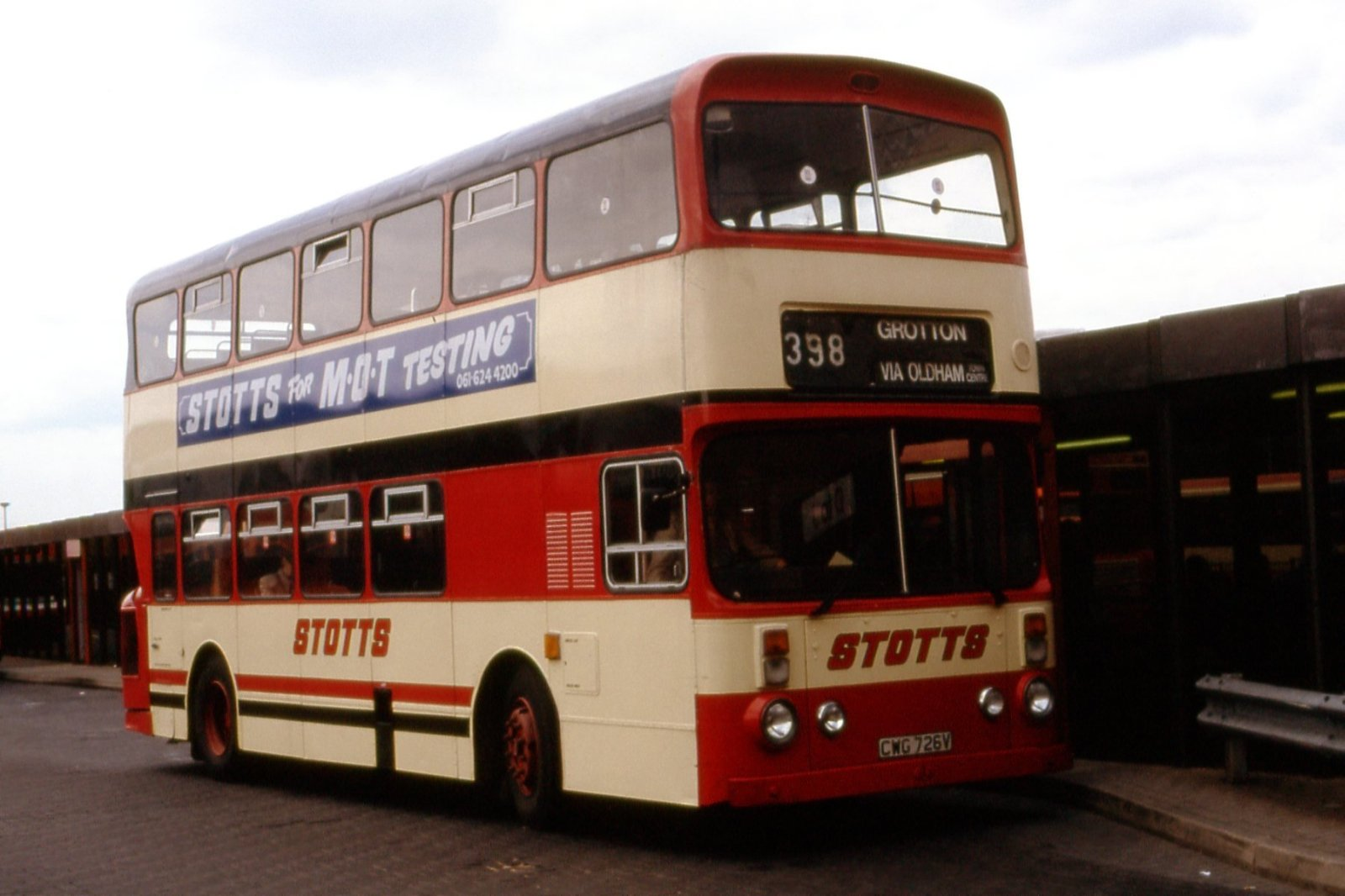
Stotts Leyland Atlantean on service 358 in Ashton-Under-Lyne bus station in 1993.

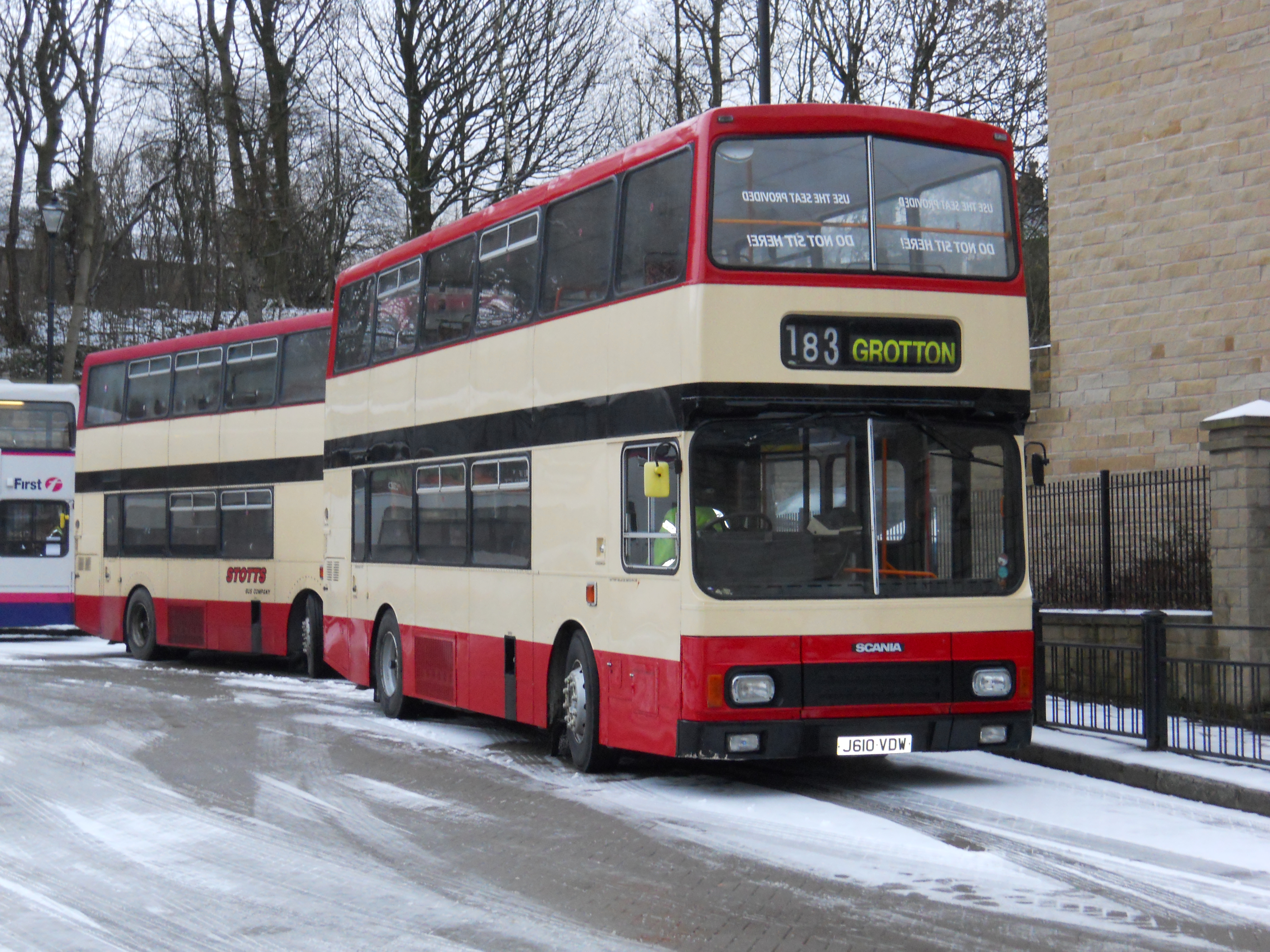
Stotts Tours Alexander-bodied Scania N113 in Uppermill Turning Circle in January 2011

Stotts was formed by the Stott family in 1963 and remained in their ownership throughout its operations, with all directors being part of the family.

Stotts initially undertook private hire and works services, with trips to Blackpool and tours of Buckingham Palace being among its activities.

Stotts driver Terence Prime represented the company at the 1968 UK Coach Rally, winning the Coach Driver of the Year award.

Following deregulation in 1986, bus services competing with GM Buses and other operators could be set up. One such operator to do this was Stotts, who commenced operation of five bus routes within the Oldham area.

Stotts expanded in 1992, purchasing a second site on Roundthorn Road, Oldham for more than £95,000.

In 1993, the Stotts depot was attacked by arsonists, leading to a two-hour fire that left three buses destroyed and a further three badly damaged, causing approximately £40,000 worth of damage.

In 1999, one of Stotts' vehicles was attacked by a group of children while carrying Hulme Grammar School students, resulting in the driver pursuing the offenders. Similarly, in 2001, another of Stotts' vehicles was attacked in Oldham while operating a school service for Hulme Grammar School. Police initially believed damage - a small hole in the vehicle's exterior with two smashed windows - to be caused by a gunshot, although this was later confirmed as not being the case. Only minor injuries caused by flying glass were reported in this incident.

In 2018, Transport for Greater Manchester unveiled plans to create a London-style transportation system. As part of this, operators were required to bid to run franchises in Tranches, progressively awarded for operation between 2023 and 2025. Stotts services, mainly operator under contract to Transport for Greater Manchester were included in Tranches 2 and 3 of this scheme.

From 2020, Stotts took delivery of Enviro200 MMC vehicles, many on lease. Stotts also bought 3 vehicles directly from Alexander Dennis in 2022, marking the first time the operator bought directly from them.

Throughout 2023 and 2024, Stotts faced operational issues with a shortage of drivers, with the owner of defunct operator Little Gem associated with the incoming franchising under the Bee Network.

In March 2024, Transport for Greater Manchester announced the results of Tranche 3 of the Bee Network, in which Stotts would not operate any services, therefore losing all remaining operations from the 5th January 2025. In the run up to this, Stotts faced further driver shortages, eventually leading to the suspension of all daytime journeys of their 335 service from the 21st December, until their end of service.

In January 2025, Stotts publicly announced that it would cease providing services for Transport for Greater Manchester from the 5th January 2025, with their final day of operation being the 4th January. After this date, all services were taken over by Diamond North West and Go North West under Tranche 3 of the Bee Network. The company's depot on Lees Road and its yard on Roundthorn Road were subsequently used to store vehicles.

== Services ==
Over its history, Stotts operated 74 routes, mainly under contract to Transport for Greater Manchester. Due to the Bee Network franchising scheme, Stotts experienced a number of service changes between 2023 and 2025. By the end of Stotts' operations, it operated 25 routes, mainly in the Tameside and Stockport area.

== Controversies ==
In 2018, Stotts became the first UK firm to be sentenced for failing to enrol staff on a pension scheme. This came after The Pensions Regulator found they should have begun pension contributions from 2015. They were ordered to pay £60,000 in fines, and backdated pension contributions at Brighton Magistrates' Court. Alongside this, Stotts had their operating license cut, from 40 to 31 discs, for an indefinite period of time.
