= Colin B. Bailey =

Art historian and museum director (born 1955)

- Born: Colin Barry Bailey; October 20, 1955 (age 71); London, England, United Kingdom
- Occupations: Art historian Museum director
- Spouse: Alan Wintermute (m. 2013)

Academic background
- Education: University of Oxford
- Thesis: Aspects of the Patronage and the Collecting of French Painting in France at the End of the Ancien Régime (1985)
- Doctoral advisor: Francis Haskell
- Influences: Henri Loyrette

Academic work
- Discipline: Art history
- Sub-discipline: Eighteenth- and nineteenth-century French art
- Institutions: Philadelphia Museum of Art; Kimbell Art Museum; National Gallery of Canada; Frick Collection; Fine Arts Museums of San Francisco; Morgan Library & Museum

Colin Barry Bailey OAL is a British art historian and museum director. Bailey is currently the Director of the Morgan Library & Museum in New York City. He is a scholar of eighteenth- and nineteenth-century French art, especially of the artist Pierre-Auguste Renoir.

== Early life ==
Born in London to Max and Hilda Bailey, Bailey received his Bachelor of Arts from Brasenose College (1978), Master of Arts (1982), and Doctor of Philosophy (1985), all in Art History from the University of Oxford. His doctoral dissertation was completed under the supervision of Francis Haskell and concerned patronage and collecting of French paintings during the end of the Ancien Régime. Shortly thereafter, Bailey was awarded a fellowship in the Department of Paintings at the J. Paul Getty Museum in Los Angeles.

== Career ==
Bailey moved to the United States to begin his curatorial career as Assistant Curator for European Painting and Sculpture before 1900 at the Philadelphia Museum of Art, where he worked from 1985 to 1989. In that final year, he was appointed Curator of European Painting and Sculpture at the Kimbell Art Museum, and was promoted to Senior Curator in 1990. Five years later, Bailey was hired as Chief Curator at the National Gallery of Canada, and was appointed Deputy Director and Chief Curator in 1998.

In 2000, Bailey became the Chief Curator of the Frick Collection, and in 2008, he gained his first directorial position after being promoted to Associate Director and Peter Jay Sharp Chief Curator. Bailey also became an inaugural fellow at the Center for Curatorial Leadership. While at the Center, Bailey held a residency at the Louvre, closely observing its director, Henri Loyrette.

In 2013, Bailey became the director of the Fine Arts Museums of San Francisco, overseeing both the de Young Museum and the Legion of Honor. Two years later, Bailey moved back to New York to become the sixth director of the Morgan Library & Museum, succeeding William Griswold.

Alongside curatorial posts, Bailey has taught art history at a number of institutions, including: the University of Pennsylvania (1988), Bryn Mawr College (1989), Columbia University (2005-2007), and the Graduate Center, CUNY (2009).

== Personal life ==
In 2013, Bailey married Alan Wintermute in New York City.

== Awards and honors ==
- Chevalier, Ordre des Arts et des Lettres (1994)
- Officier, Ordre des Arts et des Lettres (2010)
- Mitchell Prize for the History of Art for Patriotic Taste: Collecting Modern Art in Pre-Revolutionary Paris (2002-2003).
- Foundation for Italian Art and Culture Excellency Award (2013)
- Fondation Broquette-Gonin Prix du Rayonnement de la Langue et de la Littérature Françaises (2020)

== Select works ==
- The Loves of the Gods: Mythological Painting from Watteau to David. New York: Rizzoli. 1992. ISBN 9780847815210
- Renoir's Portraits: Impressions of an Age. New Haven: Yale University Press. 1997. ISBN 9780300071344
- Patriotic Taste: Collecting Modern Art in Pre-Revolutionary Paris. New Haven: Yale University Press. 2002. ISBN 9780300089868
- Building the Frick Collection: An Introduction to the House and Its Collections. New York: Frick Collection in association with Scala. 2006. ISBN 9781857593815
- Watteau to Degas: French Drawings from the Frits Lugt Collection. New York: Frick Collection. 2009. ISBN 9780912114453 (co-author with Susan Grace Galassi)
- Fragonard's Progress of Love at The Frick Collection. New York: Frick Collection. 2011. ISBN 9781904832607
- Renoir, Impressionism and Full-Length Painting. New York: Frick Collection. 2012. ISBN 9780300181081
- The Age of Watteau, Chardin and Fragonard: Masterpieces of French Genre Painting. Ottawa: National Gallery of Canada. 2003. ISBN 9780300099461
- Gabriel de Saint-Aubin, 1724-1780. New York: Frick Collection. 2007. ISBN 9780300099461

== See also ==
- List of people associated with Brasenose College, Oxford
- List of members of the Ordre des Arts et des Lettres
