= Anthony Dyson (priest) =

Professor Anthony Oakley Dyson (6 October 1935 – 19 September 1998) was a priest in the Church of England and Professor of Social and Pastoral Theology, Manchester University 1980–1998.

== Early life and education ==
Dyson was born on 6 October 1935 in Ashton-under-Lyne, Lancashire, England. He was educated at William Hulme's Grammar School, then a direct grant grammar school in Manchester. He studied modern languages and theology at Emmanuel College, Cambridge, and he graduated with a Bachelor of Arts (BA) degree in 1959; as per tradition, his BA was promoted to a Master of Arts (MA Cantab) degree in 1963.

In 1959, Dyson matriculated into Ripon Hall, Oxford, an Anglican theological college in the Liberal tradition, to train for ordained ministry. During this time, he also studied theology at Exeter College, Oxford. He left after two years of training to be ordained in the Church of England.

Dyson continued his studies during his ministry and subsequent academic career. He graduated from Exeter College with a Bachelor of Divinity (BD) degree in 1964. He undertook postgraduate research at Exeter College, and completed his Doctor of Philosophy (DPhil) degree in 1968. His doctoral thesis was titled "History in the philosophy and theology of Ernst Troeltsch".

== Ordained ministry ==
Dyson was ordained in the Church of England as a deacon 1961 and as a priest in 1962. From 1961 to 1963, he served his curacy in the Parish of Putney (consisting of St Mary's Church, Putney and All Saints' Church, Putney Common) in the Diocese of Southwark.

=== Academic career ===
In 1963, Dyson returned to Ripon Hall, Oxford, the Liberal Anglican theological college that he himself had trained at, to take up the appointment of chaplain. In 1969, he was appointed Principal of Ripon Hall in succession to Gordon Fallows.

He was appointed:

- Canon Theologian at St George's Chapel, Windsor Castle 1974–1977
- Lecturer in Theology, University of Kent at Canterbury 1977–1980
- Professor of Social and Pastoral Theology, Manchester University 1980–1998.
