= Mamoun Beheiry =

Sudanese economist (1925–2002)

First President of the African Development Bank
- In office 1964–1970
- Succeeded by: Abdelwahab Labidi

Personal details
- Born: October 1925 Umm Ruwaba, Sudan
- Died: August 2002 (Aged 77) Khartoum, Sudan
- Education: Victoria College in Alexandria & Brasenose College University of Oxford
- Profession: Economist

Mamoun Ahmed Abdel Wahab Beheiry (October 1925 – August 2002) was a Sudanese economist, known for his contributions to African and Arab banking establishments.

== Education ==
Born into a princely family in Darfur, and following earlier education at Wad Madani primary schools, Beheiry attended Victoria College, Alexandria, and then Brasenose College, University of Oxford between 1945 and 1949 where he read for a B.A. (Hons.) in PPE Politics, Philosophy and Economics. This made him one of the first African ministers to seek an education in the west.

== Career ==
As Sudan approached independence, Beheiry led the first national currency board, and became the first signatory on the inaugural Sudanese Pound. In 1959, he became the first and founding governor of the central Bank of Sudan, then went on to become the founding president of the African Development Bank, based in Côte d'Ivoire, in 1964. - AFDB History - Beheiry was unanimously elected by all member countries for a second term in 1970, but chose to step down and return to Sudan.

Due to his international reputation, Beheiry was also the first to be appointed Minister of Finance twice. Many of the country's leading infrastructure and manufacturing projects, Such as the expansion of the Gexira Cotton Scheme and the regionally renowned Kenana Sugar were planned and excecusted during Beheiry's command of the Finance Ministry. He was also instrumental in establishing Gezira University, the second largest university in the country, and chaired numerous boards including the Sudanese Shipping Lines and led the Fund for the Development of South Sudan.

== Legacy ==
Following his death in 2002, the Mamoun Beheiry Center for Economic and Social Studies and Research in Africa was established in Khartoum with the goal of promoting research in economic and social development in Africa. Among other publications, Beheiry authored his autobiography - Glimpses : from the life of a Sudanese public servant - while receiving treatment in the United States ( 1998 - 2000 ). The book was ostensibly written as his response to a group of young Sudanese graduate students that visited with him one evening and posed a question "What has your generation done for ours?".
