= Thomas Adams (writer) =

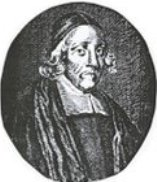
Thomas Adams.

Thomas Adams (c. 1633 – 11 December 1670) was an English academic and theological writer. He was the brother of Richard Adams.

== Life ==
He was born at Woodchurch, Birkenhead, Cheshire, where his father and grandfather, the owners of the advowson, were both beneficed. He became a student of Brasenose College, Oxford, in July 1649, and was made fellow. He became B.A. on 8 February 1653, and fellow the same year. He was M.A. on 28 June 1655, and lecturer-dean.

He was ejected from his fellowship for nonconformity in 1662, and he spent the remainder of his life as chaplain in private families. He resided within the family of Sir Samuel Jones, and afterwards was chaplain to the Dowager Countess of Clare. He died on 11 December 1670.

== Works ==
He wrote: Protestant Union, or Principles of Religion wherein the Dissenters agree with the Church of England; and The Main Principles of Christian Religion, in 107 articles, 1676 and 1677, prefaced by his brother Richard and addressed to the inhabitants of Wirrall.
