= Jeremy McMullen =

- Born: Jeremy McMullen; 14 September 1948; Blackpool
- Died: 10 February 2015 (aged 66)
- Education: Brasenose College, Oxford London School of Economics
- Occupation: Barrister

Jeremy McMullen QC (14 September 1948 – 10 February 2015) was a trade unionist and barrister who went on to be a Circuit Judge. He was an expert on employment law and workers' rights who acted for clients as diverse as Conservative Party politician Dame Shirley Porter and the trade unionist Arthur Scargill.

== Early life ==
McMullen was born on 14 September 1948 in Blackpool, the elder of two children of John, a businessman, and Irene, a teacher. He was educated at William Hulme's Grammar School in Manchester, after which he took a degree in law at Brasenose College, Oxford, and an MSc in Industrial Relations at the London School of Economics.

== Career ==
In 1971, McMullen became a barrister of the Middle Temple, then worked in New York until 1973. Subsequently, he worked as a trade union official for 11 years with the then General Municipal and Boilermakers' Union. When his Rights at Work was published in 1976, his advice to workers that they should organise, not sue, attracted the attention of The Times who noted his views that the people who administered the law "were unrepresentative, out of touch and antagonistic to workers' demands".

He fought for trade union recognition at the Chix bubble gum factory in Slough and during the Grunwick dispute.

From 1985, he appeared in several high-profile cases, obtaining an acquittal for officers of Westminster City Council caught up in the homes for votes gerrymandering scandal. He represented Dame Shirley Porter and the miners' leader Arthur Scargill on several occasions.

In 1988, he was one of the first to propose that pupil barristers should be paid while they were training by means of a levy introduced for the purpose. Historically, pupils had paid for the privilege of being trained.

McMullen became a QC in 1994, became a circuit judge in 2001, joined the Employment Appeal Tribunal in 2002, and became a senior circuit judge in 2006, and a deputy high court judge in the Queen's Bench division in 2007. He worked as a judge at the High Court, the Employment Appeal Tribunal and Southwark Crown Court.

His obituary in The Guardian called him "the leading expert of his generation on employment law, which he elevated to a new status".

== Personal life ==
McMullen married an American, Deborah Cristman, whom he met while she was studying town planning at University College London, and they married in Connecticut in 1973 and had two children. He was a rower with the Leander Club, one of the world's oldest rowing clubs, as well as the Putney Town Rowing Club and took part in the Vogalonga regatta of Venice.

McMullen was a humanist and a patron of the British Humanist Association, saying, "Humanism is the only rational explanation of life. It simply requires us to live compassionate lives, treating others with fairness and respect. It involves us seeing the best in all around us."

== Death ==
McMullen died from oesophagal cancer on 10 February 2015. At least one memorial fund has been started in his name.

== Selected publications ==
- Employment Tribunal Procedure: a user's guide to tribunals and appeals
- Rights at Work. Pluto Press, 1976.
