= Richard Sutton (lawyer) =

English lawyer, co-founder of Brasenose College, Oxford

Sir Richard Sutton (c. 1460-1524) was an English lawyer. He was founder, with William Smyth, bishop of Lincoln, of Brasenose College, Oxford, and the first lay founder of any college.

He was born in Sutton, Cheshire, the younger son of Sir William Sutton, a wealthy landowner and master of the hospital at Burton Lazars, Leicestershire. He was a barrister, and in 1499 a member of the privy council. In 1513 he became steward of the monastery of Sion, a house of Brigittine nuns at Isleworth.

How Smyth and Sutton came to plan a college is not known, but in 1508 we find Edmund Croston, or Crofton, bequeathing £6, 13s. 4d. towards the building of "a college of Brasynnose" if the projects of "the bishop of Lincoln and master Sotton" were carried into effect within a stipulated period. In the same year Sutton obtained a ninety-two year lease of Brasenose Hall and Little University Hall for £3 per annum, and from that time until the end of his life was occupied in purchasing estates with which he might endow the new college.

He is thought to have contributed to the funds of Corpus Christi College, Oxford, as well. He was knighted some years before his death, which occurred about 1524.
