= Richard Adams (religious writer) =

Richard Adams (ca. 1626 – 7 February 1698) was a non-conforming English Presbyterian divine, known as author of sermons and other theological writings.

== Life ==
He was the grandson of Richard Adams, the rector of Woodchurch, in the part of Cheshire which is called the hundred of Wirral, and son of Charles Adams, who, with his brother Randall, was brought up to the church, and became the father of four Adams - Richard, Peter, Thomas and Charles, who were all clergymen.

Adams was admitted to Brasenose College, Oxford, on 24 March 1646, where he became the friend of John Howe, became fellow, and took his master's degree in 1651. In 1655 he was settled in the church of St. Mildred, Bread-street, London, where he was a very useful preacher, and was regarded as an ornament to his function. Among his parishioners was John Milton. Being unable to comply with the terms of ministerial conformity settled on the restoration of Charles II, he resigned the living, but continued to reside in London, where, when the times allowed of non-conforming services being publicly conducted, he became pastor of a small congregation of Presbyterian dissenters, whose place of worship was situated in Parish-street, in the Borough. In this situation he remained until his death on 7 February 1698. A sermon preached on occasion of his death by John Howe was printed.

Upon his death, Adams had a significant collection of books and papers valued at over £120.

== Works ==
He was the author of the exposition of the Epistles to the Philippians and Colossians in the supplement to Matthew Poole's Annotations, and of various printed sermons. He joined Edward Veal, another non-conforming minister, in writing prefaces to several of the treatises of Stephen Charnock.

He published also two works of his brother Thomas Adams; namely, Protestant Union, and The Main Principles of the Christian Religion, 8vo. 1675.

== See also ==
- Thomas Adams, his brother
