= Tim Peto =

British academic (born 1950)

- Born: 10 March 1950 (age 76); London
- Education: Brasenose College, Oxford
- Scientific career
- Fields: Infectious disease
- Workplaces: University of Oxford John Radcliffe Hospital

Timothy Edward Alexander Peto is a professor of medicine at the University of Oxford. He is the co-leader for the Infection Theme of the Oxford Biomedical Research Centre, and a National Institute for Health and Care Research Senior Investigator.

Peto's research has included combination therapy for AIDS, the search for an effective AIDS vaccine, the transmission of methicillin-resistant Staphylococcus aureus in hospitals, and transmission mechanisms for Clostridioides difficile infections.
