= Nadine Merabi =

British-Lebanese fashion designer

- Born: 19 January 1982 (age 44); Manchester, England
- Education: University of Bath

Nadine Merabi (born 19 January 1982) is a British-Lebanese fashion designer and former field hockey player.

== Early life ==
Merabi was born in Manchester to an English mother, a teacher, and a Lebanese father. She spent the first 4 years of her life living in Tripoli, Lebanon before returning to Manchester. She attended Oldham Hulme Grammar School.

During school, Merabi became a hockey player, which earned her a scholarship to study at the University of Bath. Following 10 years playing hockey for England at an international level until 2007, Merabi explored different career options, such as an event hosting, before landing on design. She started by teaching herself how to sew through YouTube video tutorials. She was 29 in 2010 when she decided to pursue it professionally, showcasing her clothes in a local Manchester boutique.

== Fashion career ==
She originally started her own fashion label and was later appointed creative director at fashion company ONO UNO. Four seasons later, due to a demand for her signature dresses, she relaunched her MERABI brand.

She has dressed numerous actors and celebrities including Catherine Tyldesly, Michelle Keegan and Katie Piper. Her designs have been worn on the red carpet events including the National Television Awards, Cannes Film Festival, and the BAFTAS. Her designs are known for their timeless and elegant silhouettes.

In 2016 she was included in the Northern Power Women Top 50 Future List.
