= Hulme Grammar School =

School in Oldham, England

Location
- Chamber Road; Oldham, Greater Manchester, OL8 4BX; England; 53.5298°N 2.1236°W

Information
- Former name: Oldham Hulme Grammar School
- Type: Grammar school Private day school
- Motto: Fide Sed Cui Vide (Trust But See To Whom)
- Established: 1611
- Local authority: Oldham
- Department for Education URN: 105745 Tables
- Principal: Kirsten Pankhurst
- Gender: Co-educational (3-18)
- Age: 3 to 18
- Enrolment: 675
- Houses: Assheton, Booth-Platt, Hulme, Lees
- Colours: Navy Blue & Yellow
- Website: hulmegrammar.org

Hulme Grammar School (formerly Oldham Hulme Grammar School) is a private all-through school in Oldham, Greater Manchester, England.

Principals in recent years include Dr Paul Neeson (2008-2014), Craig Mairs (2014-2022), and Kirsten Pankhurst (2023–present). The school was rebranded to Hulme Grammar School in 2023, with a new logo and uniform and website.

== History ==
Oldham Hulme Grammar School was founded in 1611 by several charitable individuals including Laurence Chadeton, but closed in 1866 and was refounded, under the Endowed Schools Act 1869 (hence the claim to be a continuation of this earlier school is debated). The doorway of the original Oldham Hulme Grammar School building with its date stone and a window were incorporated into the current school building in the 1920s. When the school was refounded in 1887 it obtained some money from a charitable trust created in 1691 by a bequest from William Hulme, after whom the new school was named. The main buildings, incorporating were erected in 1895 by the Hulme Trust. The first headmaster of the new era was Samuel Ogden Andrew, who later achieved acclaim as a translator of Homer.

== Notable alumni ==
- Sir Arthur Armitage, lawyer
- Andy Barlow, footballer (Oldham Athletic)
- Bryan Clough, writer
- Brian Cox CBE, physicist, TV presenter
- Olivia Green, world champion modern penthalete
- Andy Kershaw, Radio 3 DJ
- Sarah Lancashire OBE, actress
- Phil Larder MBE, rugby player & coach
- Nadine Merabi, fashion designer
- David Nott OBE, surgeon
- Nedum Onuoha, footballer
- Bernard L. Shaw FRS, University of Leeds
- John Stapleton, TV presenter
- Nicola White MBE, hockey player
- Frank Worrall, sports journalist, author
