= William Hulme =

English lawyer and landowner (1631–1691)

William Hulme JP
- Born: 1631
- Died: 26th October 1691, aged 59 or 60.
- Education: Manchester Grammar School
- Alma mater: Brasenose College, Oxford; Gray's Inn
- Occupations: Lawyer; Philanthropist
- Known for: Foundation of the Hulme Trust
- Spouse: Elizabeth Robinson (d.1700)
- Children: Banaster Hulme (1658–73)
- Parent: William Hulme (d.1637)
- Relatives: John Hulme (1599–1657) (uncle)

William Hulme JP (c.1631 – 1691) was an English lawyer and landowner from Lancashire responsible for the creation of the Hulme Trust (also known as Hulme's Charity).

== Early life ==
The Hulme family's pedigree was recorded by the Heralds in a Visitation in 1567 but relatively little is known about Hulme's life. He is recorded as having been baptised at Bolton in 1631, the son of William Hulme (d.1637) of Hulme Hall, Reddish, Lancashire. After the death of his father in 1637, his uncle John Hulme (1599–1657), acted as his guardian. It is probable that he was educated at the Manchester Grammar School. In 1648, some of his property was seized for his Cavalier sympathies in the English Civil War.

He married Elizabeth, daughter of Ralph Robinson, in 1653.

== Career ==
Hulme is believed to have matriculated at Brasenose College, Oxford in 1649, and to have joined Gray's Inn in 1650, though there is no evidence of his having graduated from Oxford or been called to the Bar. His marriage to Elizabeth Robinson (d.1700) in 1653 brought Hulme an estate and mansion at Kearsley, where he would reside in later life. The house at Kearsley was the most significant in the locality, and accounted for seven of Kearsley's thirty-nine taxed hearths in 1666. Hulme also owned major properties at Hulme Hall in Reddish, Withingreave Hall in Withy Grove, Manchester, and Outwood near Prestwich. He held minor office in Manchester's court leet, and became a Justice of the Peace.

== Death and legacy ==
His only son, Banaster Hulme (1658–73) having died at the age of 15 while at Manchester Grammar School, Hulme left his property to his wife Elizabeth, and after her death to be held in trust forming “Hulme’s Charity” (later known as the Hulme Trust). On his death, in 1691, he was buried in the Hulme Chapel built by his ancestors in the collegiate church of Manchester (now Manchester Cathedral).

== Arms ==
Coat of arms of William Hulme
Crest A lion's head couped gules on a cap of maintenance (gules turned up ermine) upon the helmet of a gentleman. Escutcheon Barry of eight, or and azure, on a canton argent, a chaplet gules proper Motto Fide Sed Cui Vide (Trust, but see to whom)

== See also ==
- Hulme Trust

== Bibliography ==
- "Hulme, William" . Dictionary of National Biography. London: Smith, Elder & Co. 1885–1900.
- Fallows, I. B. (2008). William Hulme and his Trust. Chichester: Phillimore. ISBN 9781860775352.
- Rack, Henry (2004). "Hulme, William (bap. 1631, d. 1691)". Oxford Dictionary of National Biography. Oxford Dictionary of National Biography (online ed.). Oxford University Press. doi:10.1093/ref:odnb/14118. (Subscription, Wikipedia Library access or UK public library membership required.)
- Booker, J. (1857). A History of the Ancient Chapels of Didsbury and Chorlton, in Manchester Parish. Chetham Society, 1st Series, 42.
