= Brasenose College, Oxford =

College of the University of Oxford

Brasenose College
- University of Oxford
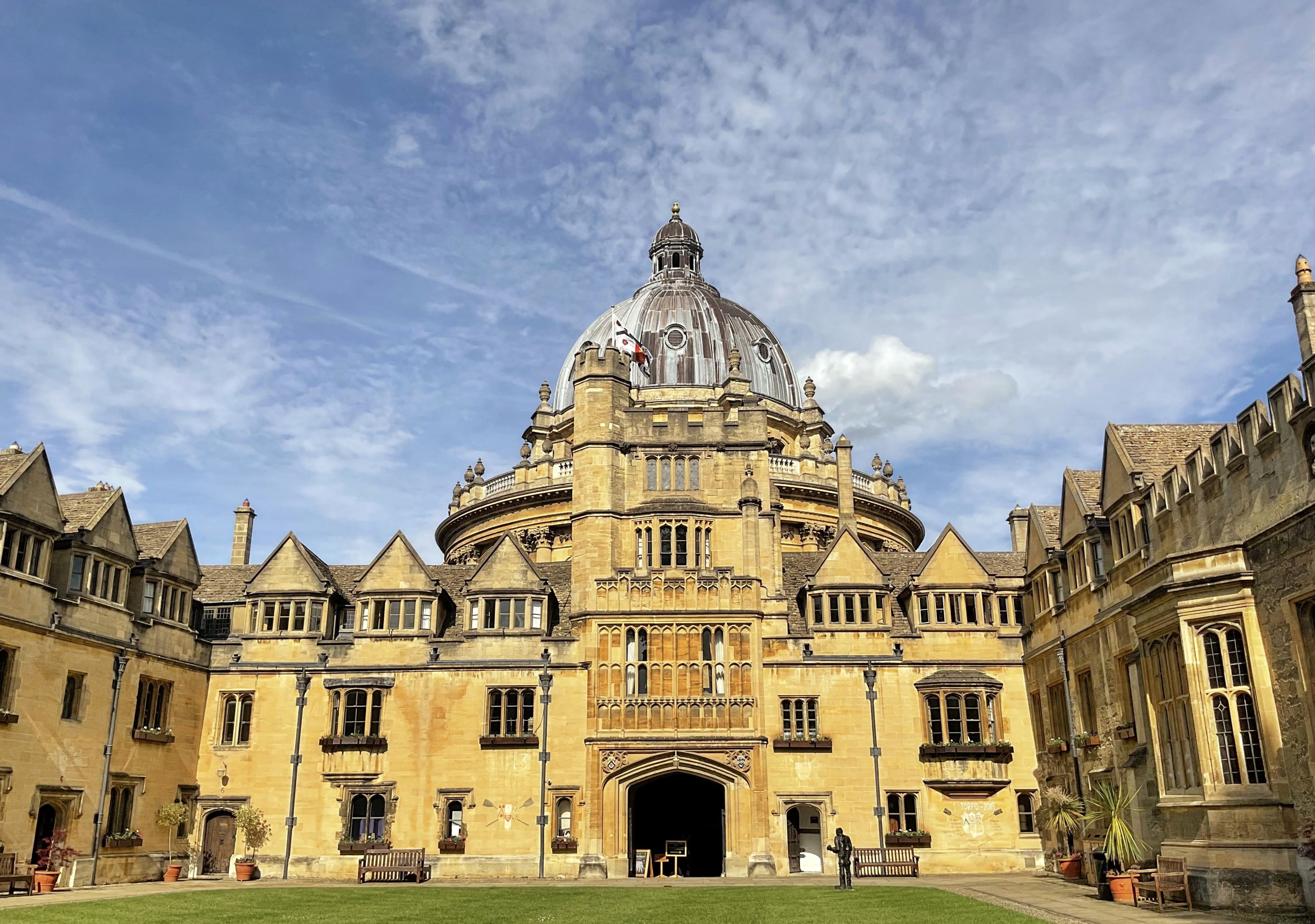
- The main gate of Brasenose College, with the Radcliffe Camera behind

- Arms: see below
Scarf colours: black, with two narrow yellow stripes a fifth of a scarf-width in from either edge
- Location: Radcliffe Square, Oxford, OX1 4AJ
- Coordinates: 51.753206°N 1.254731°W
- Full name: The Principal and Scholars of the King's Hall and College of Brasenose in Oxford
- Latin name: Aula regia et collegium aenei nasi, Collegium Aenei Nasi
- Founders: The Bishop of Lincoln, William Smyth and Sir Richard Sutton
- Established: 1509; 517 years ago
- Named after: Bronze door knocker
- Former names: Brazen Nose College
- Sister college: Gonville and Caius College, Cambridge
- Principal: Alyson King
- Undergraduates: 375 (2021)
- Postgraduates: 235 (2021)
- Endowment: £177.9 million (2021)
- Visitor: Stephen Conway, Bishop of Lincoln ex officio
- Website: bnc.ox.ac.uk
- Boat club: Brasenose College Boat Club

Map
- Location within Oxford city centre

Brasenose College, formally The Principal and Scholars of the King's Hall and College of Brasenose in Oxford, or BNC, is one of the constituent colleges of the University of Oxford in England. Founded in 1509 by Bishop of Lincoln William Smyth and Sir Richard Sutton, it traces its origins to an eponymous 13th-century medieval academic hall.

In 2023, Brasenose placed second in the Norrington Table (an unofficial measure of performance in undergraduate degree examinations). In a recent Oxford Barometer Survey, Brasenose's undergraduates registered 98% overall satisfaction. In recent years, around 80% of the UK undergraduate intake have been from state schools.

Brasenose is home to one of the oldest rowing clubs in the world, Brasenose College Boat Club. Notable alumni include two British prime ministers (Henry Addington and David Cameron), two Australian prime ministers (Sir John Gorton and Malcolm Turnbull), and three Nobel Prize winners (J. Michael Kosterlitz, Richard Robson, and Sir William Golding).

== History ==
=== Foundation ===
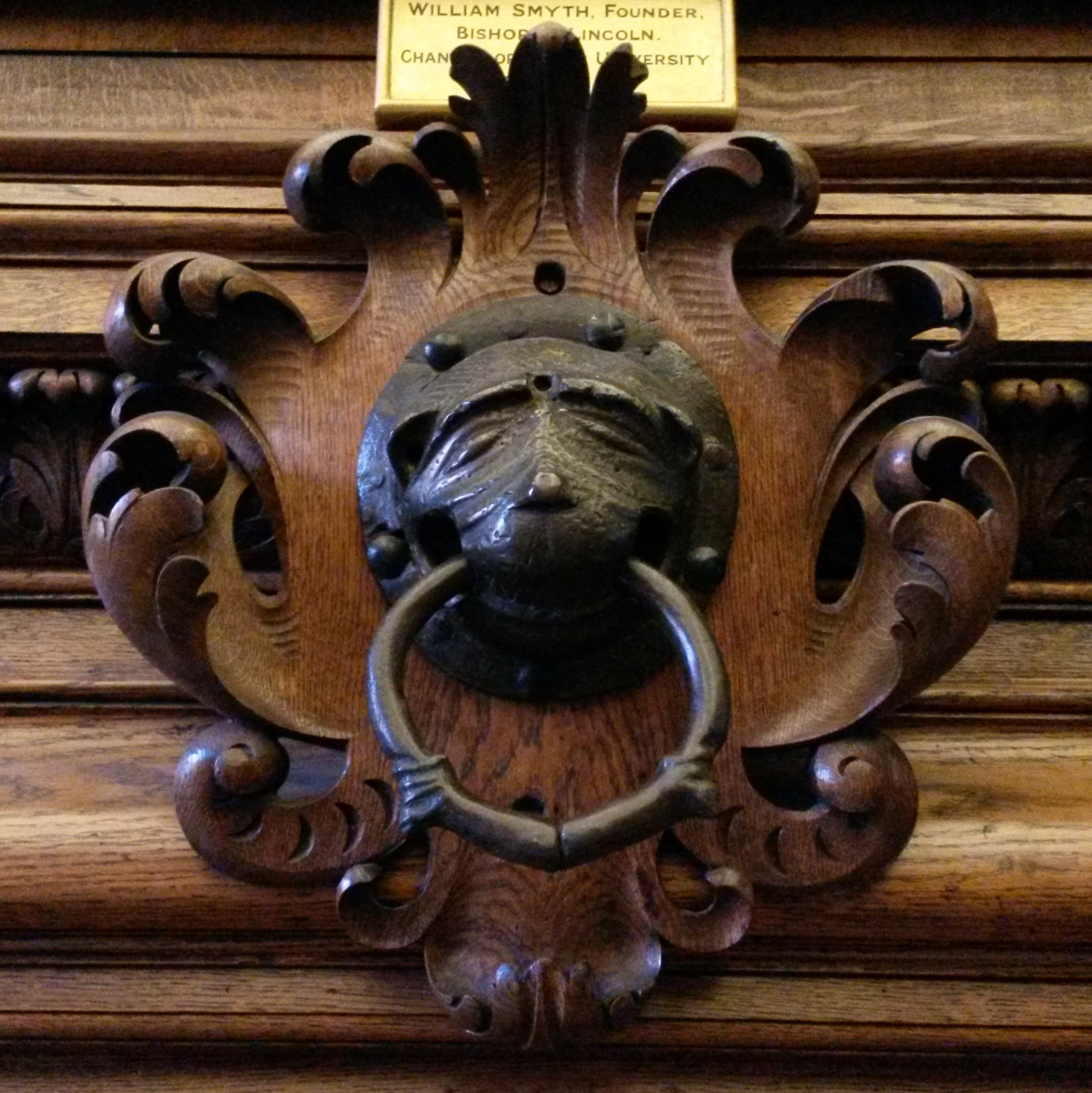
The original door knocker, now hanging in the college's dining hall. (A copy is on a door in Stamford School.)

The history of Brasenose College, Oxford, stretches back to 1509, when the college was founded on the site of Brasenose Hall, a medieval academic hall whose name is first mentioned in 1279.

Its name is believed to derive from the name of a brass or bronze knocker that adorned the hall's door and had a prominent nose, hence "Brass-Nose", which became "Brasenose" – see the picture on the left.

The college was associated with Lancashire and Cheshire, the county origins of its two founders – the Bishop of Lincoln, William Smyth and Sir Richard Sutton – a link which was maintained strongly until the latter half of the twentieth century. The first principals navigated Brasenose, with its Catholic sympathisers, through the Reformation and continuing religious reforms.

Most of Brasenose favoured the Royalist side during the English Civil War, although it produced notable generals and clergy on both sides.

The library and chapel were completed in the mid-17th century, despite Brasenose suffering continuing financial problems.

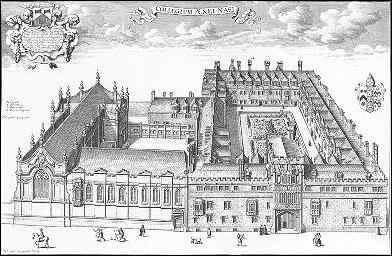
An illustration of Brasenose in 1674

=== Nineteenth century ===
After 1785 the college prospered under Principal William Cleaver. The college began to be populated by gentlemen, its income doubling between 1790 and 1810, and achieved considerable academic success. But the reconstruction of Brasenose was not completed until the end of the 19th century with the addition of New Quad between 1886 and 1911. Brasenose's financial position remained secure, although under the tenure of Principal Edward Hartopp Cradock Brasenose's academic record waned greatly, with much of its success focused on sport, where it excelled most notably in cricket and rowing.

The mid-century Royal Commissions were navigated; although they were initially opposed, some recommendations were welcomed, including the election of fellows on merit rather than by their place of birth. The election of Charles Heberden as principal in 1889 led to a gradual improvement in Brasenose's academic fortunes, although its sporting performance suffered. As the first lay principal, Heberden presided over an increasingly secular college, which opened up the library to undergraduates, instituted an entrance exam for the first time and accepted Rhodes scholars.

=== Early twentieth century ===
Brasenose lost 115 men in the First World War (including a quarter of the 1913 year), with its undergraduate numbers greatly reduced.

Lord Curzon's post-War reforms were successfully instituted. The inter-war period was defined by William Stallybrass, who as fellow and eventual principal (until 1948) dominated college life. Brasenose once again produced top sportsmen – cricketers, rowers, and others. This came at the cost of falling academic standards and poorly performing finances, which would see Stallybrass' authority challenged. He died in a railway accident before he could be forced out, however.

After the war, sporting achievements waned (although there were notable exceptions) but academic success did not improve significantly, in what was now one of Oxford's largest colleges.

=== Since 1970 ===
The 1970s saw considerable social change in Brasenose, with more post-graduate members and fewer domestic staff. In 1974 Brasenose became one of the first men's colleges to admit women as full members, bringing an end to 470 years of the college as a men-only institution. The other previously all-male colleges to begin admitting women in 1974 were Jesus College, Hertford, St Catherine's, and Wadham. The College's first female Governing Body Fellow, lawyer Mary Stokes, was elected in May 1981 and took up her Fellowship in October 1982.

There was also considerable construction work to ensure that undergraduates could be housed for the entirety of their degree on the main site and on the Frewin site; this objective was finally achieved in 1997 with the opening of the St Cross annexe and Frewin extension. Brasenose's finances were secured, and it thus entered the twenty-first century in a good position as regards financial, extracurricular and academic success.

As of 2022 the college admits undergraduates for most major courses in 17 subject groups across science, humanities, social science and arts.

== Location and buildings ==
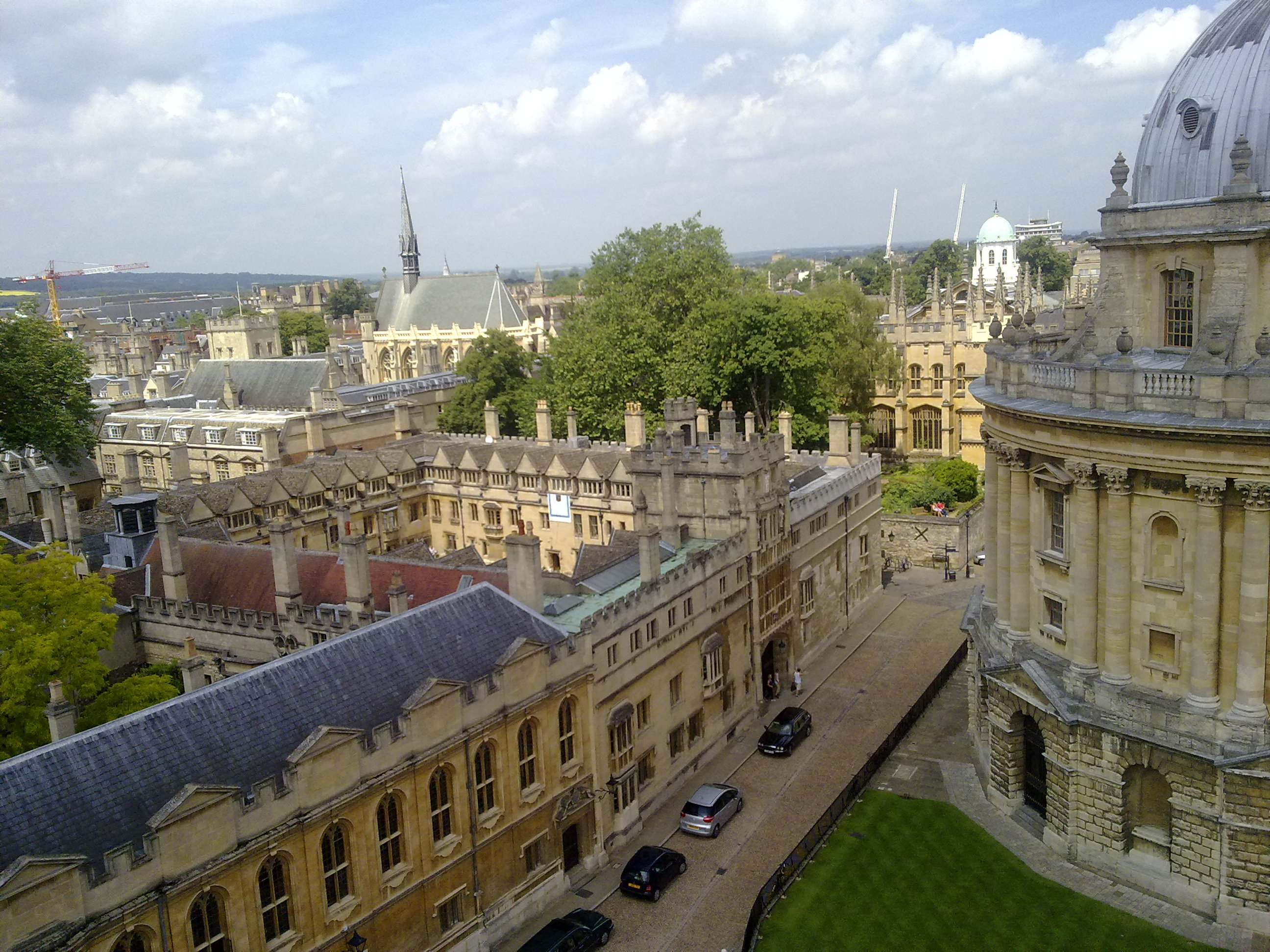
Brasenose College, seen from St Mary's. The entrance to Brasenose Lane is just right of the photo's center.

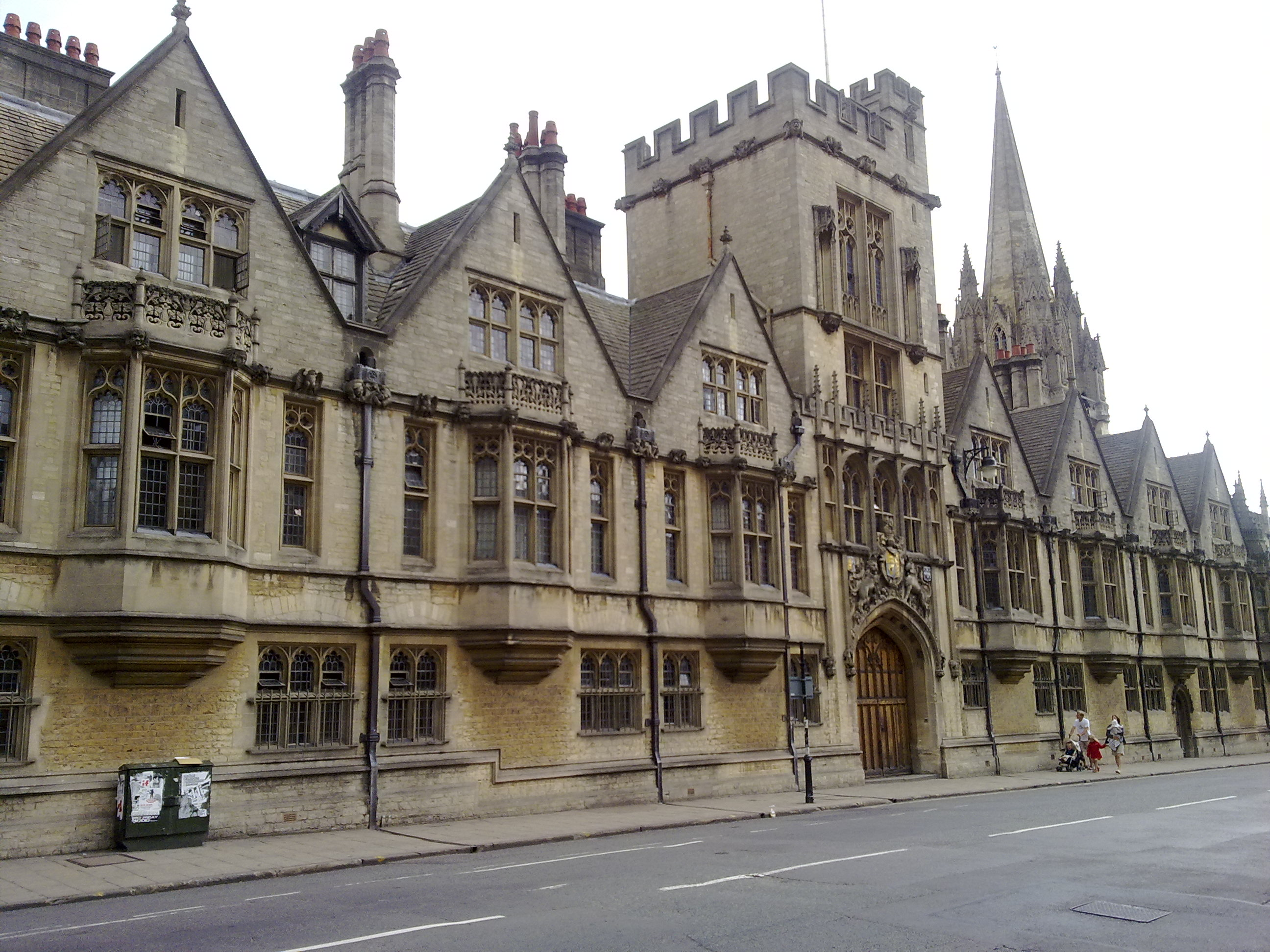
Brasenose College on the High Street, with St Mary's behind it.

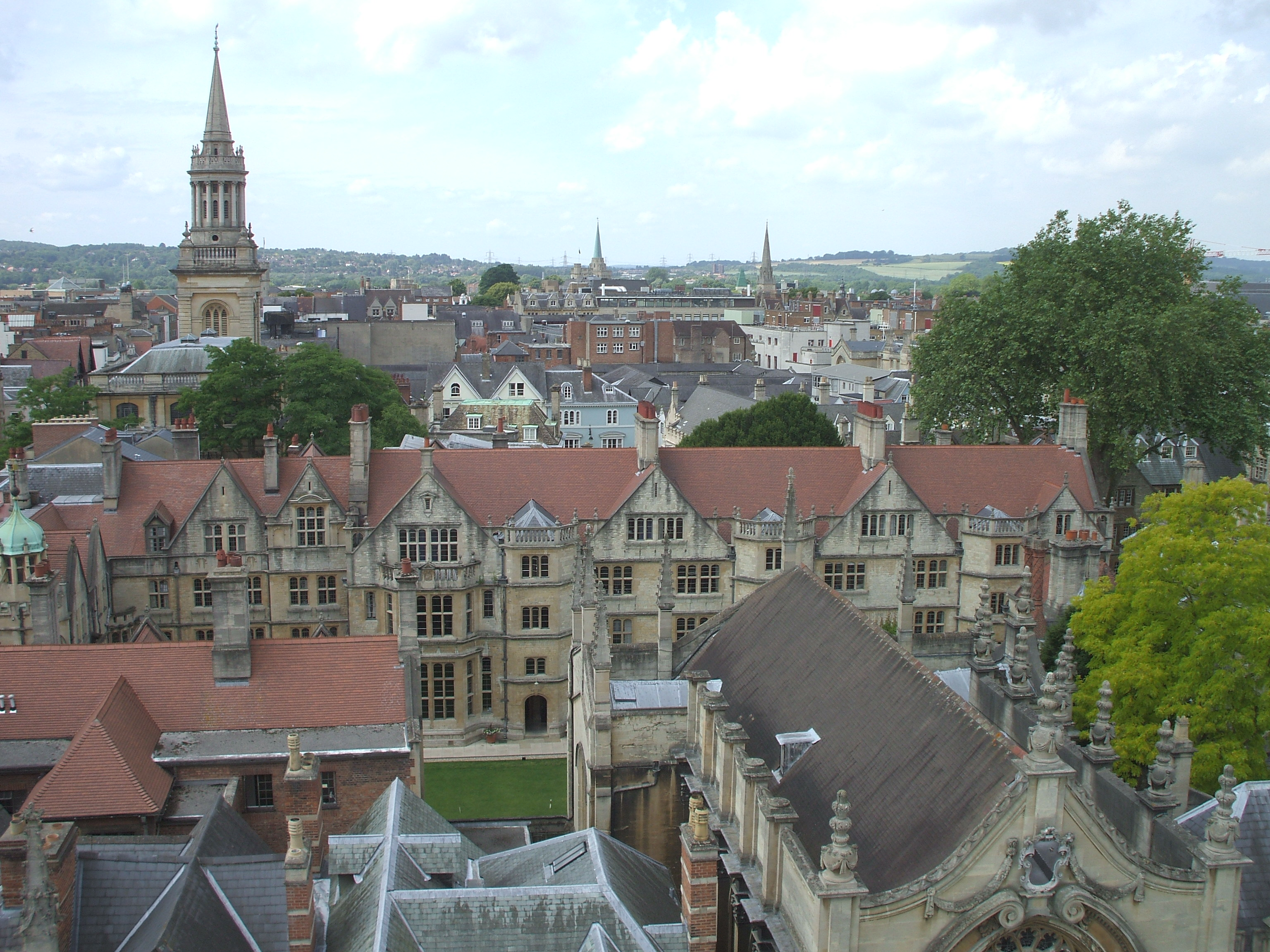
The High Street (south) end courtyard of Brasenose College, as seen from St Mary's (to the east), looking towards All Saints.

Brasenose faces the west side of Radcliffe Square opposite the Radcliffe Camera in the centre of Oxford. The north side is defined by Brasenose Lane, while the south side reaches the High Street. To the west is Lincoln College. At its south-east end, the college is separated from the University Church by St Mary's Passage. The main entrance of the college can be found on Radcliffe Square. Although not located on Turl Street, the college has informal links with the three Turl Street colleges (Lincoln, Jesus, and Exeter).

The main college site comprises three quads, the original Old Quad, a small quad known as the Deer Park, and the large New Quad, as well as collection of smaller houses facing Radcliffe Square and the High Street. The original college buildings comprised a single two-storey quad, incorporating the original kitchen of Brasenose Hall on the south side. In the 17th century a third floor was added to the quad to form the current Old Quad. A separate chapel was also built to the south, connected to the quad by a library built over a cloister as shown in a 1670 print, thus enclosing the Deer Park. The cloister was for a time the college burial ground, and evidence suggests there were at least 59 people buried there, with the last recorded burial being in 1754. The cloister was filled in to make two or three chambers in around 1807, used as student bedrooms or administrative offices until 1971, when the space was converted into the graduate common room. More recently the graduate common room moved to the Old Quad, and the space, still known as the "Old Cloisters" has been used as a library overspill area, a teaching room and, in 2010–11, as the temporary Senior Common Room. In January 2015, archaeological investigations began as a prelude to a major building project that will restore the stone work and integrate the lower and upper reading rooms, greatly enhancing the college's library provision. The nickname for the Chapel Quad is often thought to be a friendly jibe at Magdalen College which has a genuine deer park known as The Grove.

=== Dining hall ===
In the 16th century the dining hall was heated by an open fire in the centre of the room, supplemented by movable braziers. In the 1680s the hall was renovated, with a raised floor to accommodate a wine cellar below, and a reconstructed roof. Another renovation phase in the mid-18th century included a new chimneypiece, a new ceiling to cover the original timber beams and two gilded chandeliers. The original brazen nose was placed above high table in 1890.

=== Chapel ===
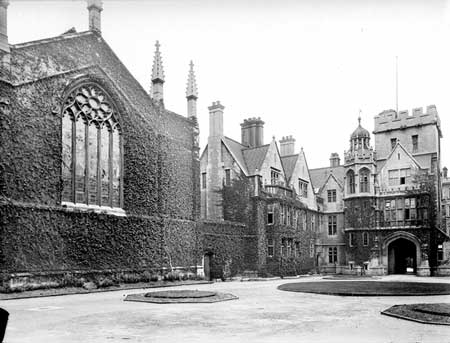
New Quad photographed by Henry Taunt in 1909, with the chapel at left

Building began on the current chapel in 1656, and it replaced an old chapel which was located in a space now occupied by the Senior Common Room. An inscription commemorates this above the door to Staircase IV. Building materials were taken from a disused chapel at the site of St Mary's College (now Frewin Hall), transported piece by piece by horse-and-cart to Brasenose College. The chapel, a mix of Gothic and Baroque styles, features a hanging fan vault ceiling of wood and plaster, and was consecrated in 1666. The internal fittings are largely 18th and 19th century, and include chandeliers presented to the college in 1749. These were donated to a parish church and later converted to gas but then returned to Brasenose when the church switched to electric lights. The chandeliers were then converted back to their original state so that candles could be used in them once again.

Various alterations were made to the Chapel after completion. Although repairs were undertaken in the meantime, the interior of the Chapel was renovated (having fallen into a poor state) in 1819, and the exterior beginning in 1841. In 1892–3 a new organ was purchased and fitted, paid for by the then Principal Charles Buller Heberden; the current organ was installed in 1973, and rebuilt in 2001–2.

=== Library ===
The current library was begun in 1658 and received its first books in 1664. It replaced a smaller library on Staircase IV, which is now used as a meeting room. The books in the current library were fixed by chains, which were only removed in the 1780s, over a hundred years later.

Author Philip Pullman opened the extensively renovated Greenland Library in May 2018, following a £4 million project to provide a better working space for students (architects – Lee/Fitzgerald). The library works were funded by three college alumni, Duncan Greenland, James Del Favero and Gerald Smith. Two reading rooms are named in honour of Del Favero and Smith respectively with the overall library taking Greenland's name The renovations won an RIBA regional RIBA Conservation award in 2019.

=== New Quad ===
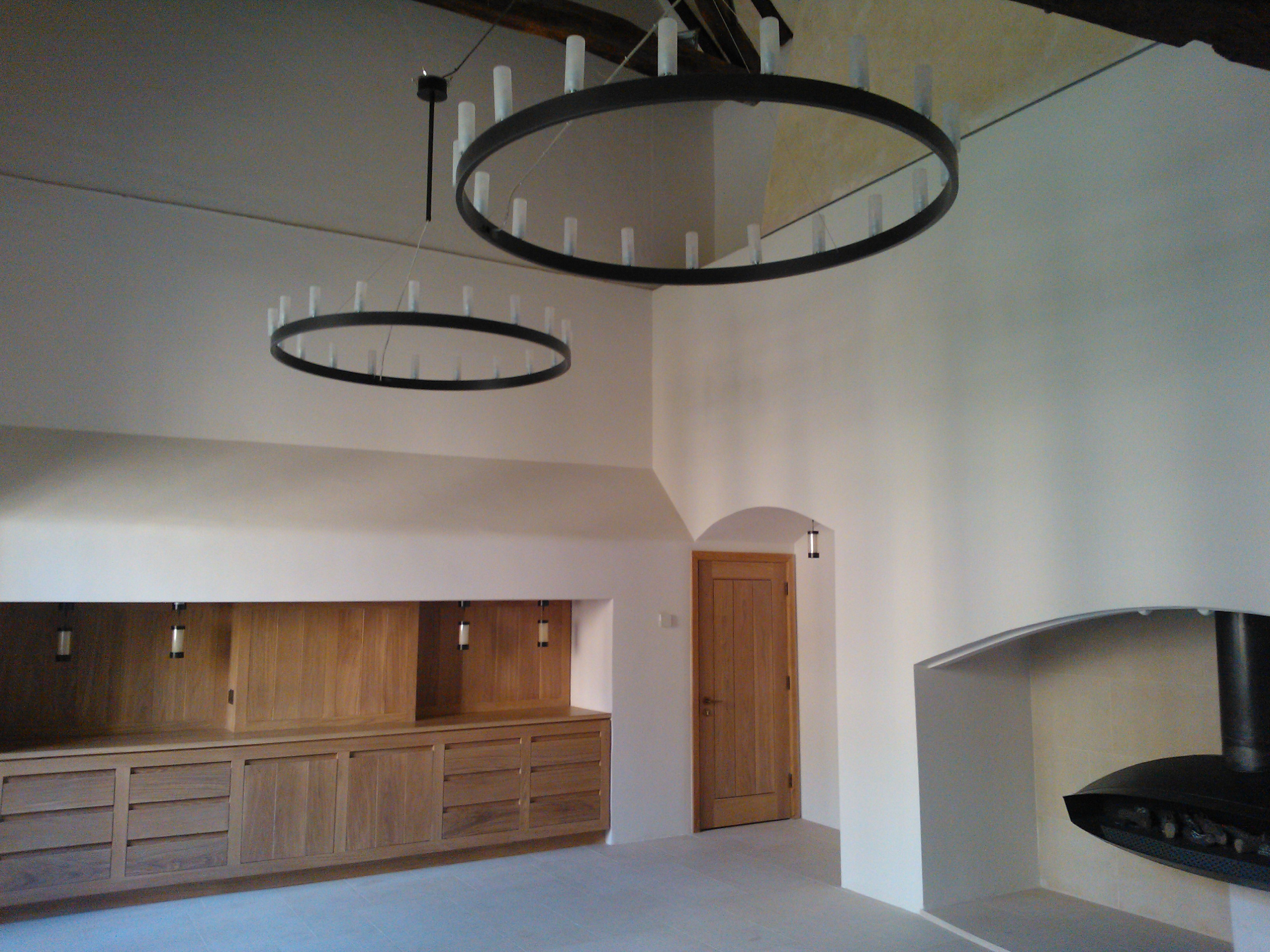
The modernised Medieval Kitchen which was renovated in 2010–12, along with other changes to dining and some living rooms, in a series of building work known as "Project Q"

New Quad was designed by TG Jackson and finished in 1911, replacing a number of existing buildings. The current site was completed in 1961 with new buildings, used largely for first year undergraduate accommodation, designed by the architects Powell and Moya.

In 2010 a project was begun to renovate the kitchens, servery, dining hall and some other areas of college. The project included the installation of under floor heating and a new timber floor in the dining hall, new kitchen equipment, a new servery area, additional dining and meeting places, and disabled access to the dining hall. During the project, the Old Quad housed a temporary dining hall and kitchen, while the New Quad was used to store building materials.

The dining hall refurbishment was completed by September 2010, whilst the remaining work was completed around Easter 2012. The new catering facilities were unveiled during a ceremony on 14 March 2012. During the ceremony, college members gathered in a restored 15th century building in the heart of college, originally the college kitchens and most recently used as the servery. This room, to be known as the Mediaeval Kitchen, will be used as a new dining space in addition to the main dining hall, which will remain the usual location for student meals. The temporary kitchen and builder's yard were removed and the Quads restored to their normal state during the Easter 2012 vacation.

In recent years the Junior Common Room (JCR) and Bar have also been renovated.

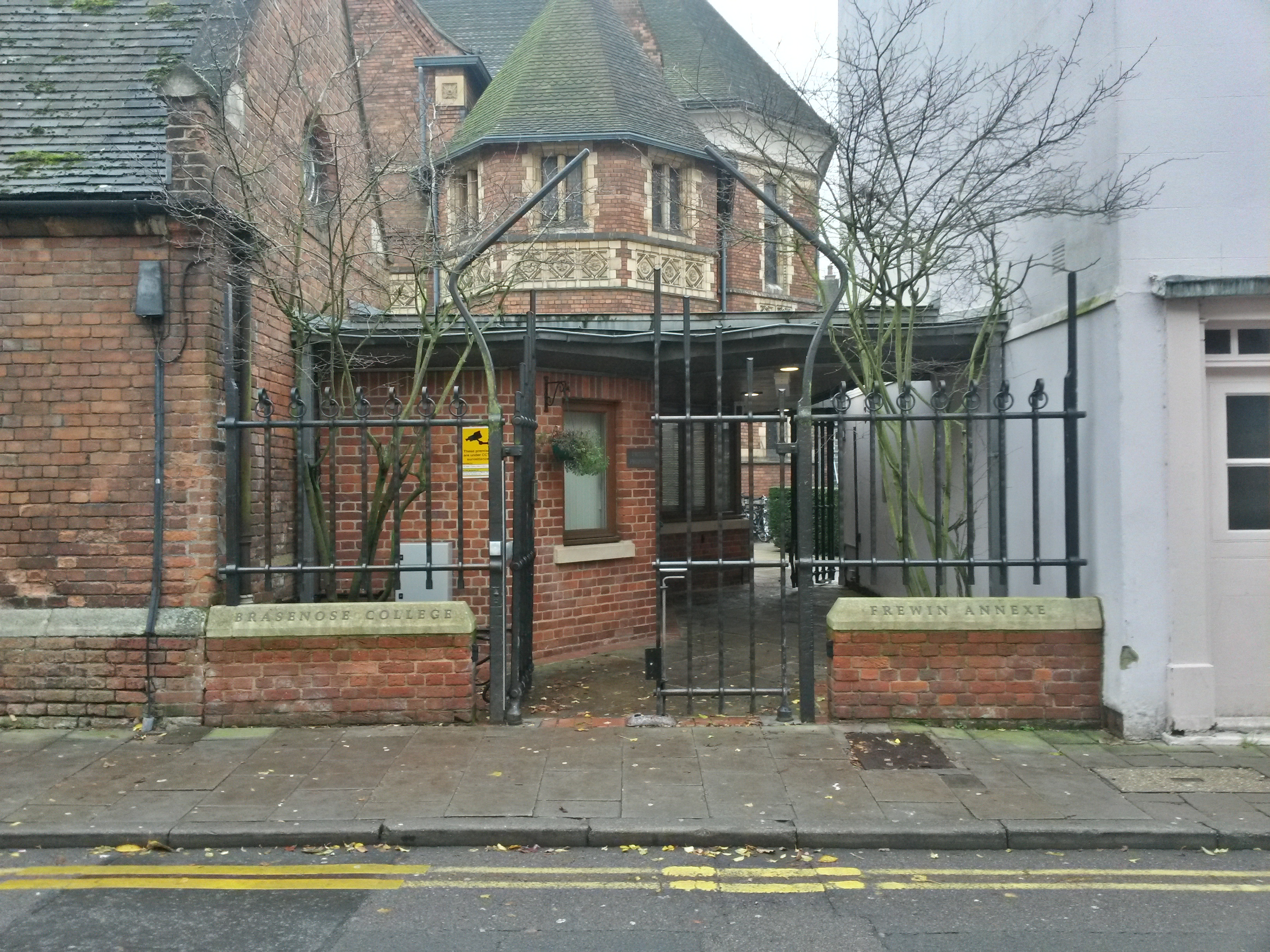
The entrance to the undergraduate Frewin Annexe.

=== Annexes ===
The college has a large undergraduate annexe situated on St Michael's Street, developed from Frewin Hall in the 1940s. Frewin Hall had previously housed a number of tenants from outside the college, including King Edward VII.

Second, Third and Fourth year undergraduates typically choose to live in bedrooms at Frewin. A recent building project at Frewin, aimed to increase the undergraduate bedroom provision and improve facilities, has unearthed some significant archeological finds including a 4,000-year-old prehistoric burial mound, a limestone wall foundation, butchered animal bones, decorated floor tiles, a stone flagon, a bone comb and a medieval long cross silver penny

There is also a graduate annexe shared with St Cross College, which was completed in 1995. The St Cross annexe is laid out in clusters of five bed-sitting rooms, sharing two shower rooms and a kitchen. A second graduate annexe, Hollybush Row, was opened in September 2008 and is located close to the railway station and Said Business School. It consists of single rooms with en-suite bathrooms and shared kitchens.

== Traditions ==
=== Coat of arms ===
The coat of arms of Brasenose College

Brasenose College's coat of arms is quite complex, since it incorporates the personal arms of the founders and the arms of the See of Lincoln.

Its blazon (description in formal heraldic terms) is: Tierced in pale: (1) Argent, a chevron sable between three roses gules seeded or, barbed vert (for Smyth); (2) or, an escutcheon of the arms of the See of Lincoln (gules, two lions of England in pale or, on a chief azure Our Lady crowned seated on a tombstone issuant from the chief, in her dexter arm the Infant Jesus, in her sinister arm a sceptre, all or) ensigned with a mitre proper; (3) quarterly, first and fourth argent, a chevron between three bugle-horns stringed sable; second and third argent, a chevron between three crosses crosslet sable (for Sutton).

A simpler form has occasionally been used where the central tierce contains the arms of the See of Lincoln, rather than displaying them on a mitred escutcheon. Because of the complexity of the arms they are not suitable for use on items such as the college crested tie, where the brazen nose is used instead.

=== College prayer ===
The college prayer is read by the principal or a fellow at evensong on Sundays during term and at gaudies.

Individual benefactors are commemorated in an annual pattern, with the founders being commemorated (as shown above) on the first Sunday of Michaelmas Term, and at all gaudies.

=== Graces ===
The following preprandial grace is read by the Bible Clerk at Formal Hall:

Latin	English
Oculi omnium spectant in te, Deus! Tu das illis escas tempore opportuno. Aperis manum tuam et imples omne animal tua benedictione. Mensae caelestis nos participes facias, Deus, Rex aeternae gloriae.	The eyes of all look to thee, O God! Thou givest them meats in due season. Thou openest Thy hand and fillest every living thing with thy blessing. Make us participants at the heavenly banquet, O God, King of eternal glory.

The grace after dinner is only read on special occasions, and the list of benefactors included in this grace is quite variable.

Latin	English
Qui nos creavit, redemit et pavit, sit benedictus in aeternum. Deus, exaudi orationem nostram. Agimus Tibi gratias, Pater caelestis, pro Gulielmo Smyth episcopo et Ricardo Sutton milite, Fundatoribus nostris; pro Alexandro Nowel, Jocosa Frankland, Gulielmo Hulme, Elizabetha Morley, Mauritio Platnauer, aliisque benefactoribus nostris; humiliter te precantes ut eorum numerum benignissime adaugeas. Ecclesiam Catholicam, et populum Christianum custodi. Haereses et errores omnes extirpa. Carolum Regem nostrum et subditos eius defende. Pacem da et conserva, per Christum Dominum nostrum. Amen.	May he who hath created, redeemed and provided for us be blessed for ever. Hear our prayer, Lord. We give thee thanks, heavenly Father, for William Smyth, Bishop, and Richard Sutton, Knight, our Founders; for Alexander Nowell, Joyce Frankland, William Hulme, Elizabeth Morley, Maurice Platnauer and for our other benefactors, humbly beseeching thee that thou wilt add to their number in goodness. Safeguard the Catholic Church and all Christian people. Root out all heretical waverings. Defend Charles our King and his subjects. Grant peace and preserve it, through Christ our Lord. Amen.

=== Rivalry with Lincoln College ===
As is common with Oxford colleges, the college has a long-standing rivalry with neighbour Lincoln College, to which it is physically linked with an adjoining door, which is only opened once a year. According to a folk story dating back several centuries, when a mob once chased students at the University through the town, the Lincoln porter allowed in the Lincoln students but refused entry to the Brasenose member, leaving him to the mercy of the mob. An alternative is that a Lincoln man bested a Brasenose man in a duel. Either episode resulted in the Brasenose student's death. As such, the two colleges now share a tradition revived annually on Ascension Day, when, for five minutes, Brasenose members are permitted to enter Lincoln College through the aforementioned door. Brasenose members are subsequently served an ale by Lincoln, which is traditionally flavoured with ground ivy to discourage excessive consumption, before pennies are thrown from the college tower to local children. In the evening, the choirs of the two colleges sing a joint Evensong, which alternates between each college's chapel yearly.

== Student life ==
The Junior Common Room plays a central part in the life of the undergraduate community. Offering social, recreational and welfare support to the students, the elected committee addresses many aspects of student life and liaises with the governing body and graduate student representatives.

Unlike most Oxford colleges, the graduate common room is known as the Hulme Common Room (HCR), named after a past benefactor, rather than the Middle Common Room (MCR).

The college also organises an annual summer arts festival, one of the largest in the university. First staged in 1994, it features events such as an outdoor launch party, plays, pantomimes, comedy evenings, musical performances, film nights, a poetry brunch, and a bake-off, all organised by Brasenose students. In 2015, Brasenose also celebrated the 40th anniversary of the admission of women into the college through an exhibition, which modelled the portraits in the Dining Hall, by filling the JCR with a series of portraits of female alumnae titled "40 Years of Brasenose Women". In 2017 the undergraduates held their first "Frewchella" festival, named after the Coachella Valley Music and Arts Festival in California and the college's Frewin Annexe, featuring food, music and a bouncy castle. In 2018 special events included Chinese New Year, a St David's Day dinner and an Egg Hunt.

=== Music ===
The college has a director of music, who directs the chapel choir with the assistance of up to three organ scholars; the current director is Polina Sosnina, organist at St Martin-in-the-Fields, London. The director of music also facilitates a range of concerts, which usually happen on a weekly basis. These include the professional Platnauer Concerts, held in memory of Maurice Platnauer, Principal of Brasenose (1956–1960). Other concerts are designed to highlight talented soloists or groups of performers in college. The college awards up to four music scholarships at any one time through auditions in the year prior to entry or at the beginning of the academic year.

Brasenose College has a non-auditioned choir, although up to eight choral scholarships are offered to members of Brasenose, again, through auditions in the year prior to entry or at the beginning of the academic year. Up to four choral exhibitions may also be given to members of Brasenose and other colleges. The choir sings Evensong every Sunday, and also sings for various special services and events, including two carol services, the annual joint service with Lincoln College and other occasions. Recently there has been the inauguration of a biennial Alumni and Music Reunion Dinner, with a Festal Evensong for all attendees preceding this. The choir regularly goes on tour, for instance to Paris in 2006, Lombardy in 2009, Rome in 2010 and Belgium in 2013, and sings at cathedrals near Oxford during term-time.

In 2010 and 2011 the college ran the Wondrous Machine event, where local primary school children were invited to Brasenose for interactive sessions to learn about the pipe organ and the science behind the musical instrument.

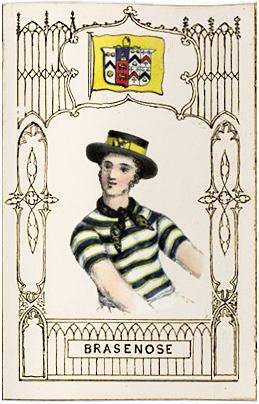
An 1840s depiction of Brasenose college's rowing outfit

=== Sport ===
Brasenose students participate in a wide range of sports including football, netball, hockey, tennis, lacrosse, basketball, badminton, squash, pool, rugby, darts, boxing, dancesport and more. Student play at all levels and participation is completely optional and forms no part of the admissions process.

Brasenose College Boat Club (commonly abbreviated to BNCBC) is the rowing club of the college and is believed to be one of the oldest boat clubs in the world. The date of formation of the club is impossible to verify: a boat from the college took part in the earliest recorded race between rowing clubs anywhere in the world. This was a head race in Oxford in 1815, beating Jesus College Boat Club. A number of college members have rowed for the university against Cambridge University in the Boat Race and the Women's Boat Race. Notably, Walter Woodgate, a Boat Race winner, eleven-time Henley champion and inventor of the coxless four, John (Con) Cherry who represented Great Britain at the 1936 Summer Olympics in Berlin and Andrew Lindsay who won a gold medal in rowing at the 2000 Summer Olympics, and participated in the Boat Race in 1998 and 1999.

The college boathouse, which is shared with Exeter College Boat Club, is in Christ Church Meadow, on the Isis (as the River Thames is called in Oxford). It replaced a moored barge used by club-member and spectators. Brasenose College Rugby Football Club (abbreviated to BNCRFC) can draw association with William Webb Ellis, who is often credited as the inventor of the game and studied at Brasenose.

== People associated with the college ==
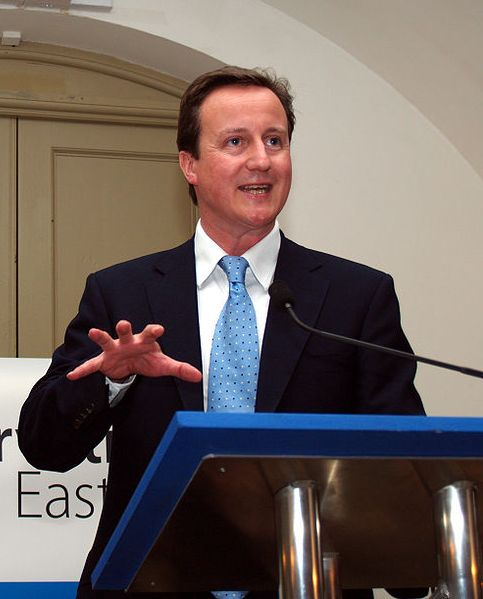
David Cameron, former Prime Minister of the United Kingdom

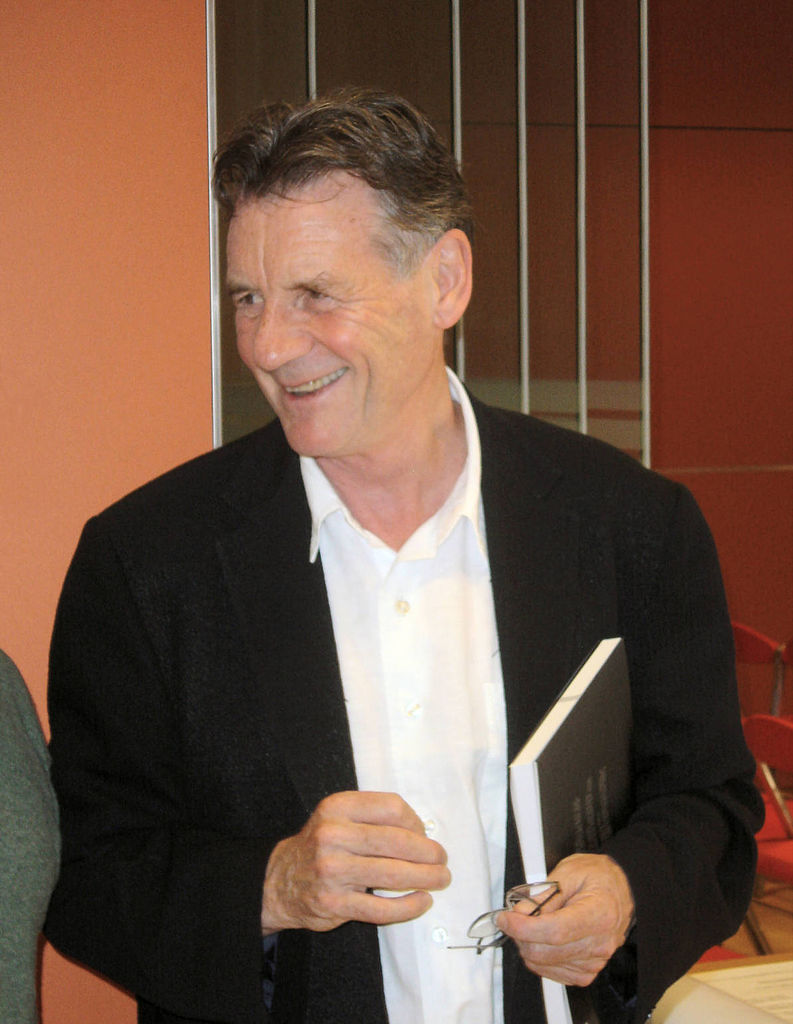
Michael Palin, actor and comedian

Notable former students of the college have included politicians, scientists, writers, entertainers and academics.

Among the best known living Brasenose alumni are former Prime Minister David Cameron, former Prime Minister of Australia Malcolm Turnbull, actor/comedian Mark Williams, actor/comedian Michael Palin, and Jessie Burton, author of The Miniaturist, as well as Duncan Campbell, journalist and co-founder of the charity Stonewall, Dominic Barton, former managing director of McKinsey and the Canadian ambassador to China, author David Langford, J. Michael Kosterlitz, Nobel laureate in Physics in 2016, Richard Robson, Nobel laureate in Chemistry in 2025, Kate Allen director of Amnesty International UK, and George Monbiot, environmental and political activist.

Earlier alumni include Henry Addington, Prime Minister of the United Kingdom, Elias Ashmole, founder of the Ashmolean Museum, John Buchan, author of The Thirty-Nine Steps, John Clavell, highwayman and author, Colin Cowdrey, English Test batsman, William Webb Ellis, often credited with the invention of Rugby football, John Foxe, author of Actes and Monuments popularly abridged as Foxe's Book of Martyrs, William Golding, winner of the Nobel Prize in Literature, John Gorton, Prime Minister of Australia, William Robert Grove, pioneer of fuel cells, Douglas Haig, 1st Earl Haig, soldier, Robert Runcie, Archbishop of Canterbury, Bruce Kent, active in the Campaign for Nuclear Disarmament, and Thomas Traherne, poet and theologian.

== See also ==
- Brasenose College Boat Club
- Brasenose Lane
- Camden Professor of Ancient History
- Radcliffe Square
- University of Stamford
