= List of alumni of University College, Oxford =

University College, Oxford is one of the constituent colleges of the University of Oxford. Its alumni include politicians, lawyers, bishops, poets, and academics. The overwhelming maleness of this list is partially explained by the fact that, from its foundation in 1249 until 1979, women were barred from studying at the college.

== Alumni ==
The sub-headings are given as a general guide and some names might fit under more than one category.

Abbreviations used in the following tables

- M – Year of matriculation at University College (a dash indicates that the individual did not matriculate at the college)
- G – Year of graduation / conclusion of study at University College (a dash indicates that the individual graduated from another college)
- DNG – Did not graduate: left the college without taking a degree
- ? – Year unknown; an approximate year is used for table-sorting purposes.
- (F) after name – later became a Fellow of University College, and included on the list of Fellows
- (HF) after name – later became an Honorary Fellow of University College

Degree abbreviations

- Undergraduate degree: BA – Bachelor of Arts
- Postgraduate degrees:

- BCL – Bachelor of Civil Law
- BD – Bachelor of Divinity
- BLitt – Bachelor of Letters
- BMus – Bachelor of Music
- BSc – Bachelor of Science
- BTh – Bachelor of Theology
- MA – Master of Arts
- MB – Bachelor of Medicine
- MD – Doctor of Medicine

- MLitt – Master of Letters
- MSc – Master of Science
- MPhil – Master of Philosophy
- DCL – Doctor of Civil Law
- DD – Doctor of Divinity
- DLitt – Doctor of Letters
- DMus – Doctor of Music
- DPhil – Doctor of Philosophy
- DTh – Doctor of Theology

The subject studied and the degree classification are included, where known. Until the early 19th century, undergraduates read for a Bachelor of Arts degree that included study of Latin and Greek texts, mathematics, geometry, philosophy and theology. Individual subjects at undergraduate level were only introduced later: for example, Mathematics (1805), Natural Science (1850), Jurisprudence (1851, although it had been available before this to students who obtained special permission), Modern History (1851) and Theology (1871). Geography and Modern Languages were introduced in the 20th century. Music had been available as a specialist subject before these changes; medicine was studied as a post-graduate subject.

=== Politicians and civil servants ===
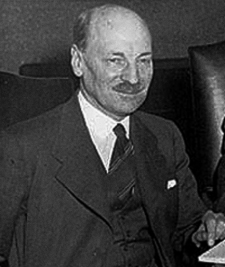
Clement Attlee, 1st Earl Attlee

Bill Clinton

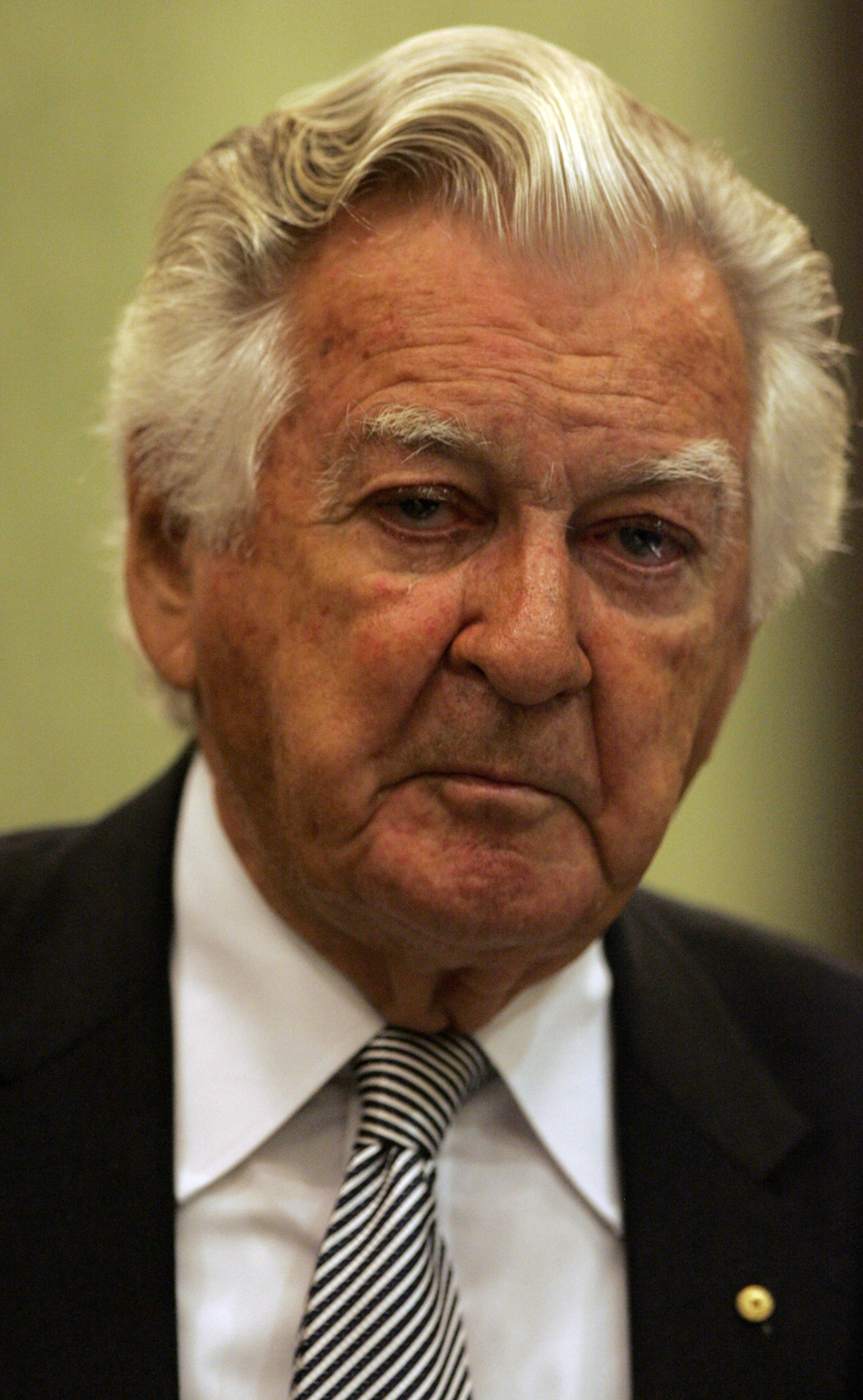
Bob Hawke

Name	M	G	Degree	Notes	Ref
Clement Attlee (F)	1901	1904	BA Modern History (2nd)	British Prime Minister	
Sir Jeremy Beecham	1962	1965	Law (1st)	Labour politician	-
Kofi Abrefa Busia	1941	1947	BA PPE, DPhil	Prime Minister of Ghana	-
Robert Cecil	?	?	Law	A founder of the League of Nations, Nobel Peace Prize 1937.	-
Bill Clinton (HF)	1968	1970	[DNG]	42nd President of the United States of America	-
William de Silva	?	?	?	Ceylonese politician	-
Andrew George	?	1981	MA Agricultural Economics	Liberal Democrat MP	-
Richard Fuller	?	?	?	Conservative MP	-
Philip Hammond	?	?	PPE	Conservative Chancellor of the Exchequer 2016–present, Foreign Secretary 2014–2016	-
Bob Hawke (HF)	?	?	BLitt	Australian Prime Minister (Labor)	-
Festus Mogae (HF)	?	?	Economics	President of Botswana	-
Colin Moynihan	1974	1977	BA PPE	Silver medal 1980 Olympics, Conservative MP 1983–92, Minister for Sport 1987–90, Chairman British Olympic Association 2005	-
Robert Reich	1968	1970	PPE	22nd United States Secretary of Labor (Democratic Party)	-
David Renton (HF)	?	?	Law	MP	-
John Scott	?	1770	BA	Lord Chancellor of Great Britain	-
Roger Short	1963	1967	Literae humaniores	British consul-general to Turkey	-
Rajiva Wijesinha	?	?	Literae humaniores	University teacher; Sri Lankan Liberal Party MP, 2010–15	-
Tan Jee Say	1973	1976	PPE	Singaporean politician and former civil servant	-
Henry Thrale	1744	?	?	MP	-
William Weld	?	?	Economics	governor of Massachusetts	-
Andrew Theophanous	?	1973	MLitt Philosophy	Australian Labor Party, first Australian federal MP to be imprisoned for corruption.	-
Sir Edgar Whitehead	?	?	?	Prime Minister of Southern Rhodesia	-
Sir Rowland Whitehead	?	?	History (1st)	KC MP	-
Thomas A. Shannon Jr.	1980	?	Politics	American diplomat, former acting United States Secretary of State	
John Maxton	?	?	?	Labour MP for Glasgow Cathcart, 1979–2001	-
Josh Frydenberg	?	?	MPhil International Relations	Treasurer of Australia, Deputy Leader of the Liberal Party of Australia	-
Alan Williams	?	?	PPE	Labour MP for Swansea West, 1964–2010	-
James Plaskitt	?	?	PPE	Labour MP for Warwick and Leamington, 1997–2010	-
Chris Philp	?	?	BA Physics	Conservative MP for Croydon South	-
Simon Clarke	2003	2006	History	Conservative MP for Middlesbrough South and East Cleveland	-
Huw Pill	?	1989	PPE	Chief Economist of the Bank of England	

- Lord Butler of Brockwell, civil servant, college master
- Charles Jenkinson, 1st Earl of Liverpool, longest-serving President of the Board of Trade, namesake of the Hawkesbury River
- Sir Angus Mackintosh, British diplomat
- Sir Roger Newdigate, MP for Middlesex and for Oxford University, establisher of the Newdigate Prize
- Jacob Pleydell-Bouverie, 2nd Earl of Radnor, MP for Salisbury
- William Scott, 1st Baron Stowell, Camden Reader of Ancient History, judge of the Admiralty Court, MP for Oxford University
- Sir Banastre Tarleton, British military leader during the American Revolutionary War and later Whig MP for Liverpool
- William Windham, Secretary of State for War and the Colonies

=== Clergy ===
- George Abbot, Archbishop of Canterbury (1611–33)
- Charles Boyd, Archdeacon of Colombo (1891-1901)
- Christopher Chessun, Bishop of Southwark (2011–present), Bishop of Woolwich (2005-2011)
- Anthony Fisher, Catholic Archbishop of Sydney 2014–present, Bishop of Parramatta (2010–2014)
- Richard Fleming, bishop of Lincoln (1420–31)
- George Horne, bishop of Norwich (1790–92)
- Tom Longworth, bishop of Pontefract 1939–49, bishop of Hereford (1949–61)
- Tobias Matthew, Archbishop of York (1606–28)
- Malcolm Menin, bishop of Knaresborough (1986–97)
- Peter Mumford, bishop of Hertford (1974–81), bishop of Truro (1981–89)
- Richard Godfrey Parsons, bishop of Middleton (1927–32), bishop of Southwark (1932–41), bishop of Hereford (1942–48)
- Herbert Sidney Pelham, bishop of Barrow-in-Furness (1926–1944)
- John Potter, Archbishop of Canterbury (1737–47)
- Grandage Edwards Powell, bishop of Penrith (1939-44)
- Arthur Penrhyn Stanley, Dean of Westminster (1863–81), Rector of St Andrews (1874-77)

=== Architects ===
- Jack Diamond, architect of Mariinsky Theatre II and Sidney Harman Hall
- Sir Philip Dowson, architect of four accommodation blocks at Stavertonia

=== Artists and writers ===
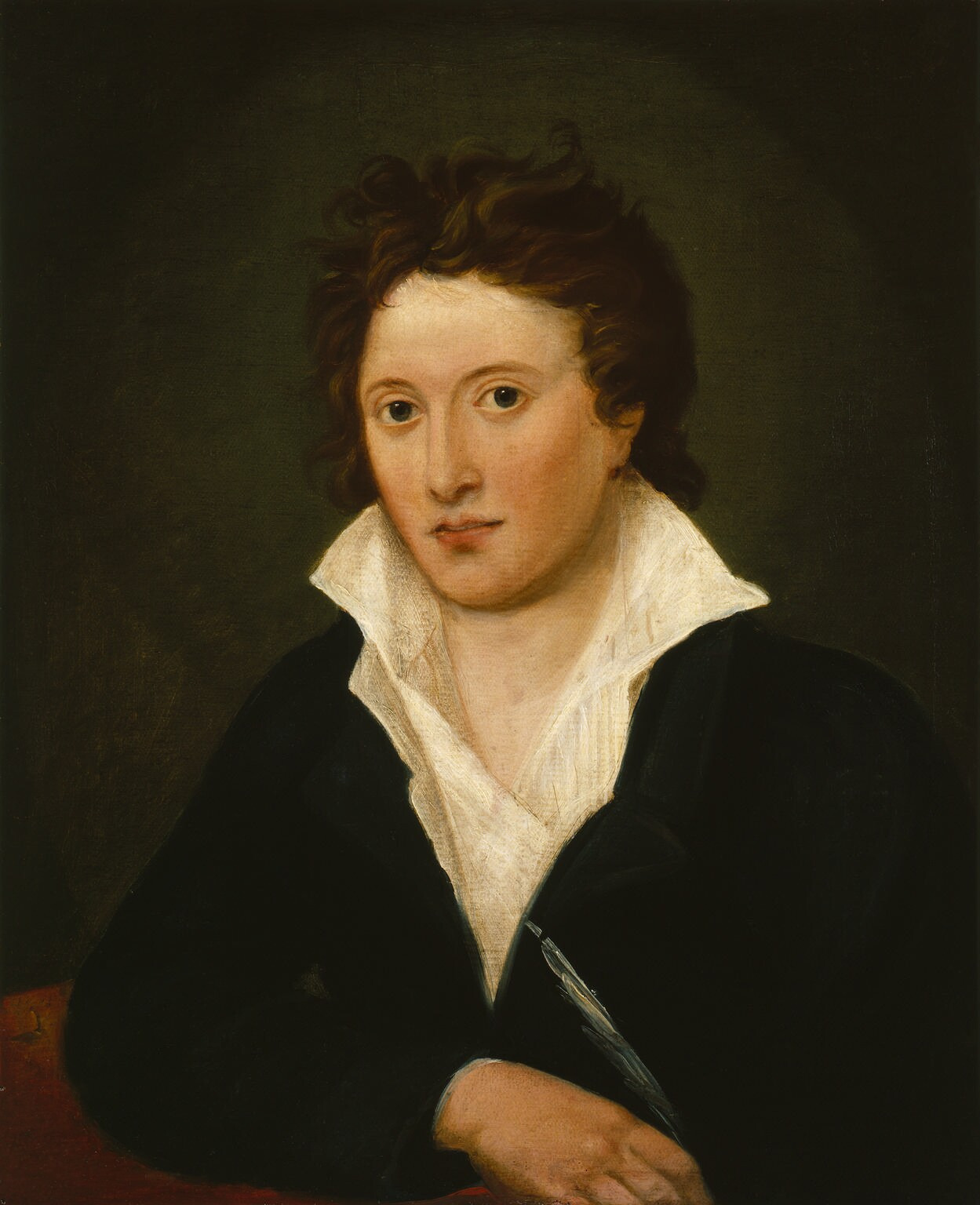
Percy Bysshe Shelley

- Edwin Arnold, poet, journalist, translator from Hindi
- Peter Bayley, literary critic
- Augustus Hare, writer
- Michael Brand, composer
- W. G. Collingwood, artist
- Kodwo Eshun writer, theorist and filmmaker
- Maurizio Giuliano, writer, traveller, and United Nations official
- Ivo Graham, comedian and writer
- Fred Harrison (born 1944), author and economist
- Armando Iannucci, comedian, writer, satirist and radio producer
- Richard Ingrams, co-founder of Private Eye
- Richard Jago, poet
- Gerard Langbaine, biographer
- C. S. Lewis, writer, critic; student there from 1919 to 1923 (originally joined in 1917 but left soon afterwards after being called up for action in the Great War); Philosophy tutor from 1924 to 1925
- Peter McDonald, poet
- Cecil Mercer, novelist
- Andrew Motion, British Poet Laureate
- Neel Mukherjee, novelist
- Braham Murray, theatre director
- Shiva Naipaul, novelist and writer
- Sir V. S. Naipaul, writer and Nobel Laureate
- Andrew Robinson, author and former newspaper editor
- Aubrey de Sélincourt, writer and classicist
- William Shawcross, chairman of the Charity Commission for England and Wales, writer
- Desmond Shawe-Taylor, artist
- Percy Bysshe Shelley, poet
- Sophie Solomon, violinist, songwriter and composer
- Charles Sorley, poet
- Stephen Spender, poet and writer
- Mams Taylor, recording artist/songwriter, mixed-martial arts fighter and activist
- Rajiva Wijesinha, writer
- Fabian S. Woodley, poet

=== Philosophers and theologians ===
- Willie E. Abraham, Ghanaian philosopher, first African fellow of All Souls College, Oxford
- F. H. Bradley, Idealist philosopher
- David O. Brink (visiting student), American moral and political philosopher
- Frederick Cornwallis Conybeare, orientalist and religious thinker
- A. C. Ewing, philosopher
- A. D. Lindsay, 1st Baron Lindsay of Birker, Scottish political philosopher and historian of philosophy, Master of Balliol College, Oxford
- R. G. Collingwood, Idealist philosopher and archaeologist
- Gareth Evans, philosopher of language and mind, Wilde Reader in Mental Philosophy
- John Finnis, Australian legal philosopher
- Owen Fiss, American jurist, Sterling Professor (Yale University)
- Mark de Bretton Platts, philosopher of language
- Mortimer Sellers, American jurist
- Irving Singer (did not take degree), American philosopher
- Peter Singer, Australian moral and political philosopher, Ira W. DeCamp Professor of Bioethics (Princeton University)
- Jeremy Waldron, New Zealander political and legal philosopher, former Chichele Professor of Social and Political Theory
- Kwasi Wiredu, Ghanaian philosopher

=== Broadcasters, journalists and entertainers ===
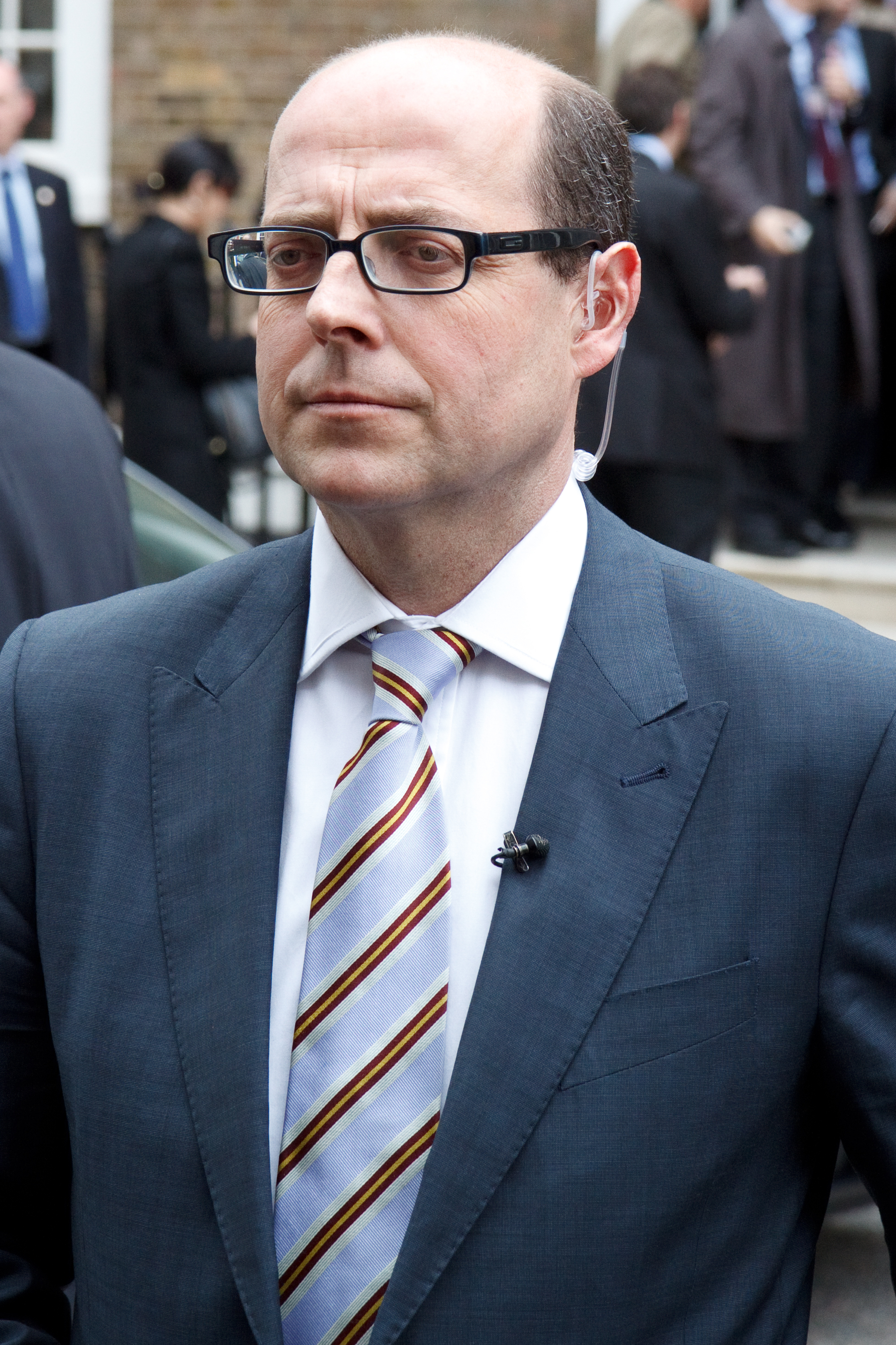
Nick Robinson

- Peter Beinart, The New Republic 1999–2006, editor-at-large 2006–
- Nick Denton, founder of Gawker media
- Edward Enfield, broadcaster and writer
- Paul Foot, journalist and socialist
- Richard Francis, managing director of BBC radio
- Paul Gambaccini, presenter of and writer on pop music
- Christopher Hitchens, atheist, Vanity Fair Writer
- Gordon Honeycombe, actor and playwright
- Tom Hooper, Academy Award-winning director
- Aboubakr Jamaï, journalist
- Owen Jones, author and journalist
- Christina Lamb, journalist and author
- Warren Mitchell, actor
- James Owen, writer and journalist
- Nigel Playfair, actor and theatre manager
- Mike Ratledge, keyboardist and composer
- James Ridley, author
- Nick Robinson, journalist and BBC political editor
- Rajdeep Sardesai, journalist
- Peter Sissons, television newsreader
- Philippa Thomas, journalist and chief presenter at BBC World News
- Alex Thomson, television journalist
- Michael York, actor
- Andy Zaltzman, political comedian

=== Scientists, inventors and engineers ===
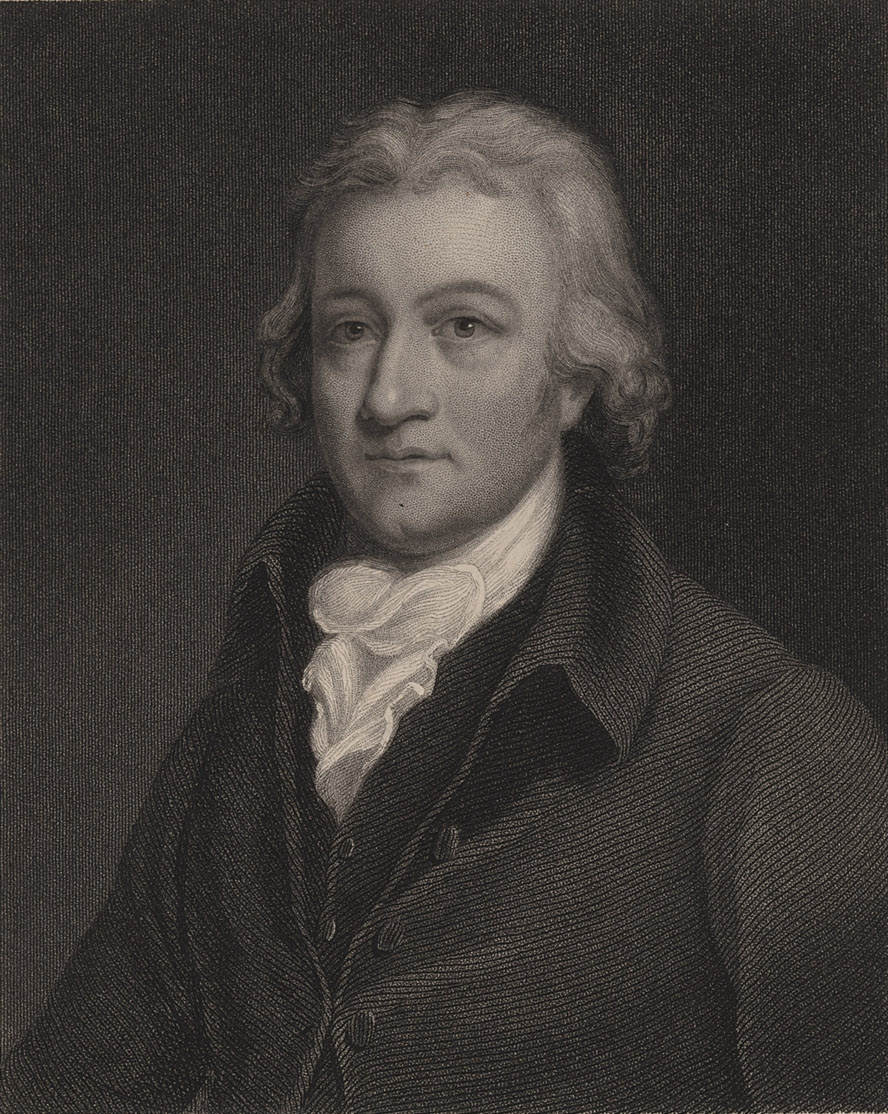
Edmund Cartwright

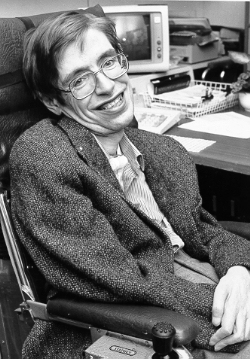
Stephen Hawking

Name	M	G	Degree	Notes	Ref
Jonathan Bowen	1974	1977	MA	Computer scientist	-
Edmund Cartwright	?	?	?	Clergyman and loom-inventor	-
Stephen Hawking	1959	1962	BA	Theoretical physicist	-
John Radcliffe	?	?	?	Royal Physician to William & Mary and politician	-
Sir Simon Wessely	?	1981	BM BCh	Psychiatrist	-

- Bob Allen, surgeon
- Bill Roscoe, computer scientist
- Paul Thompson, neuroscientist

=== Social scientists, historians and philologists ===
- Ernst Badian, classical scholar, John Moors Cabot Professor of History Emeritus at Harvard University
- James Franck Bright, historian, Master of University College, Oxford
- Hedley Bull, Australian scholar of international relations
- Robin Darwall-Smith, archivist of University College
- E. R. Dodds, Irish classicist, Regius Professor of Greek (Oxford)
- Katharine Ellis, music historian
- Christopher Fyfe, historian of west Africa
- E. V. Gordon, Canadian philologist, editor and teacher of medieval Germanic languages
- Norman Hampson, historian of the French Revolution
- Kenneth Hamilton Jenkin, historian
- Sir William Jones, Anglo-Welsh philologist, discoverer of Sanskrit's relationship to Latin and Greek
- Aly Kassam-Remtulla, Canadian anthropologist
- Monier Monier-Williams, linguist, Boden Professor of Sanskrit
- Herman Ramm, archaeologist
- Geoffrey Serle, Australian historian
- Ernest de Sélincourt, literary critic and editor

=== Sports people ===
- John Allen, Australian teacher, rugby player and cricketer
- Francis Birley, three-time winner of the FA Cup in the 1870s
- Mark Evans, Canadian rower, Olympic Gold Medallist in the 8+, Los Angeles 1984 Olympics
- J. Michael Evans, Canadian rower, Olympic Gold Medallist in the 8+, Los Angeles 1984 Olympics
- Alan Fyffe, 1908 Olympian
- Thomas Gubb, rugby union international, represented Great Britain on 1927 British Lions tour to Argentina
- Douglas Mackintosh, alpine skier, participated in the 1956 Winter Olympics
- Nick Mallett, rugby player and coach
- Charles Thomas McMillen, retired NBA professional basketball player, US congressman
- Richard Nerurkar, Olympic athlete
- Acer Nethercott, British coxswain, Olympic silver medallist for GB 8+, Beijing 2008 Olympics
- James Parker, rower
- Tom Solesbury, GB pair, Beijing 2008 Olympics, and GB quad, London 2012 Olympics
- Adrian Stoop, rugby player
- Ralph Williams, cricketer and barrister

=== Judges and lawyers ===
- Oswald Cheung, barrister of Hong Kong, known as the "doyen of the bar"
- Christian Cole, Inner Temple member and first black graduate of Oxford University
- Kenneth Diplock, judge and Law Lord
- Andrew Edis, judge
- Sir David Edward, Scottish lawyer and academic, Judge of the European Court of Justice
- Robert A. Gorman (born 1937), law professor at the University of Pennsylvania Law School
- Neil Gorsuch, Associate Justice of the United States Supreme Court
- John Dyson Heydon, Justice of the High Court of Australia
- David Hodgson, Australian judge
- Jonathan Mance, Baron Mance, Justice of the Supreme Court of the United Kingdom
- Evelyn Monier-Williams, circuit judge
- Walter Paton (1853–1937), English barrister who played for Oxford University in the 1873 FA Cup Final
- Sir John Richardson, Puisne Judge of Common Pleas
- Geoffrey Robertson, human rights barrister, academic, author and broadcaster
- Joseph Santamaria, Judge of the Court of Appeal of the Supreme Court of Victoria
- Raymond Wacks, Emeritus Professor of Law and Legal Theory, author

=== Military ===
- Ivo Branch, officer in the Life Guards implicated in the Cleveland Street scandal (1889)
- Francis Rawdon-Hastings, 1st Marquess of Hastings, general, Governor-General of India
- John Rawlins, surgeon vice-admiral, Medical Director-General of the Royal Navy
- Bernard W. Rogers, four-star general, Chief of Staff of the U.S. Army

=== Business people ===
- Kevin Hartz, co-founder of Eventbrite and early-stage investor
- David Hatendi, banker, founder of Hatendi Private Equity Advisors, Zimbabwe's first black Rhodes Scholar.
- Bruno Schroder, billionaire banker
- Edward W. Scott, founder of BEA Systems and former senior United States government official
- Simon Thompson, chairman of 3i, former chairman of the Tarmac Group and Tullow Oil

=== Other ===
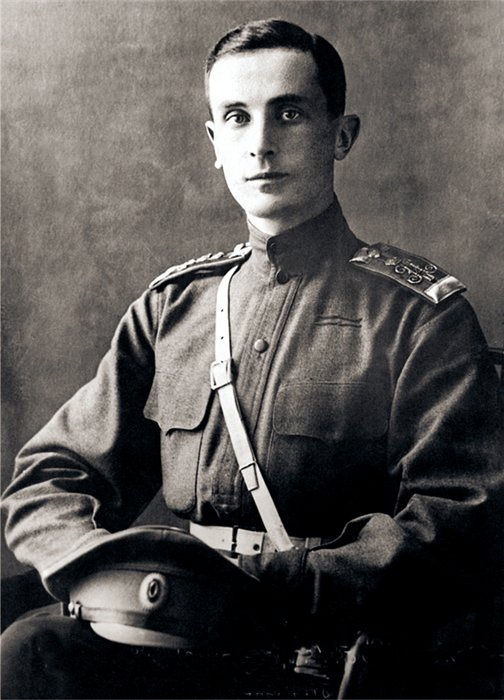
Prince Felix Yusupov

- G.G. Bradley, noted Latinist, college master
- Chelsea Clinton, daughter of Bill Clinton, the 42nd U.S. President, and the former U.S. Secretary of State, Hillary Clinton
- Michael Hoban, headmaster of Harrow School
- Luke McShane, chess Grandmaster
- Joseph Bennet Odunton, Ghanaian public servant, first black African to hold appointment at the Buckingham Palace
- Sir Alan Stewart, founding vice-chancellor of Massey University, New Zealand
- Edward Maunde Thompson, Principal Librarian British Museum 1888–98, Director and Principal Librarian 1898–1909
- Israel Tonge, conspirator
- John Webster, classical organist
- Felix Yusupov, participant in the murder of Grigori Rasputin

== Future fellows ==
A number of alumni became fellows at their Alma mater at some point in their academic career. Honorary fellows are marked with an asterisk.

List
- John Appleton, academic and later Master
- Peter Bayley, literary critic
- Thomas Bennet, academic and later Master
- Thomas Benwell, academic and later Master
- Joseph Bingham, historian
- Jon Blundy, geologist
- George Granville Bradley, priest and later Master of the college
- James Franck Bright, historian and later Master
- John Browne, academic, later Master
- Robert Burton, academic and later Master
- Roger Cashmore, physicist
- Richard Clayton, canon and later Master
- Bill Clinton*, 42nd President of the United States
- Thomas Cockman, academic and later Master
- George Croft, priest
- Horace Davey, judge and politician
- E. R. Dodds, classicist
- Gareth Evans, philosopher
- Robin Fearn, (Note: visiting Fellow) diplomat
- Thomas Foston, Master of the college
- Valpy French, Christian missionary
- John Finnis, legal philosopher
- Laurence Grensted, priest and chaplain of University College
- Edmund Lacey, bishop and later Master
- Reginald Walter Macan, classical scholar and later Master
- Jonathan Mance*, judge
- Peter Medd, priest
- James Plaskitt, (Note: Lectureship only) politician
- Thomas Plumer, lawyer and politician
- Frederick Charles Plumptre, classicist and later Master
- David Renton*, politician
- Bill Roscoe, computer scientist
- Sir Amherst Selby-Bigge, civil servant and academic
- William Smith, antiquary and author of The Annals of University College
- Travers Twiss, jurist
- Obadiah Walker, historian and later Master
- Abraham Woodhead, writer

== See also ==
- Former students of University College
- Fellows of University College, Oxford
- Alumni of University College Players, college dramatic society
