= William Smith (antiquary) =

English antiquarian

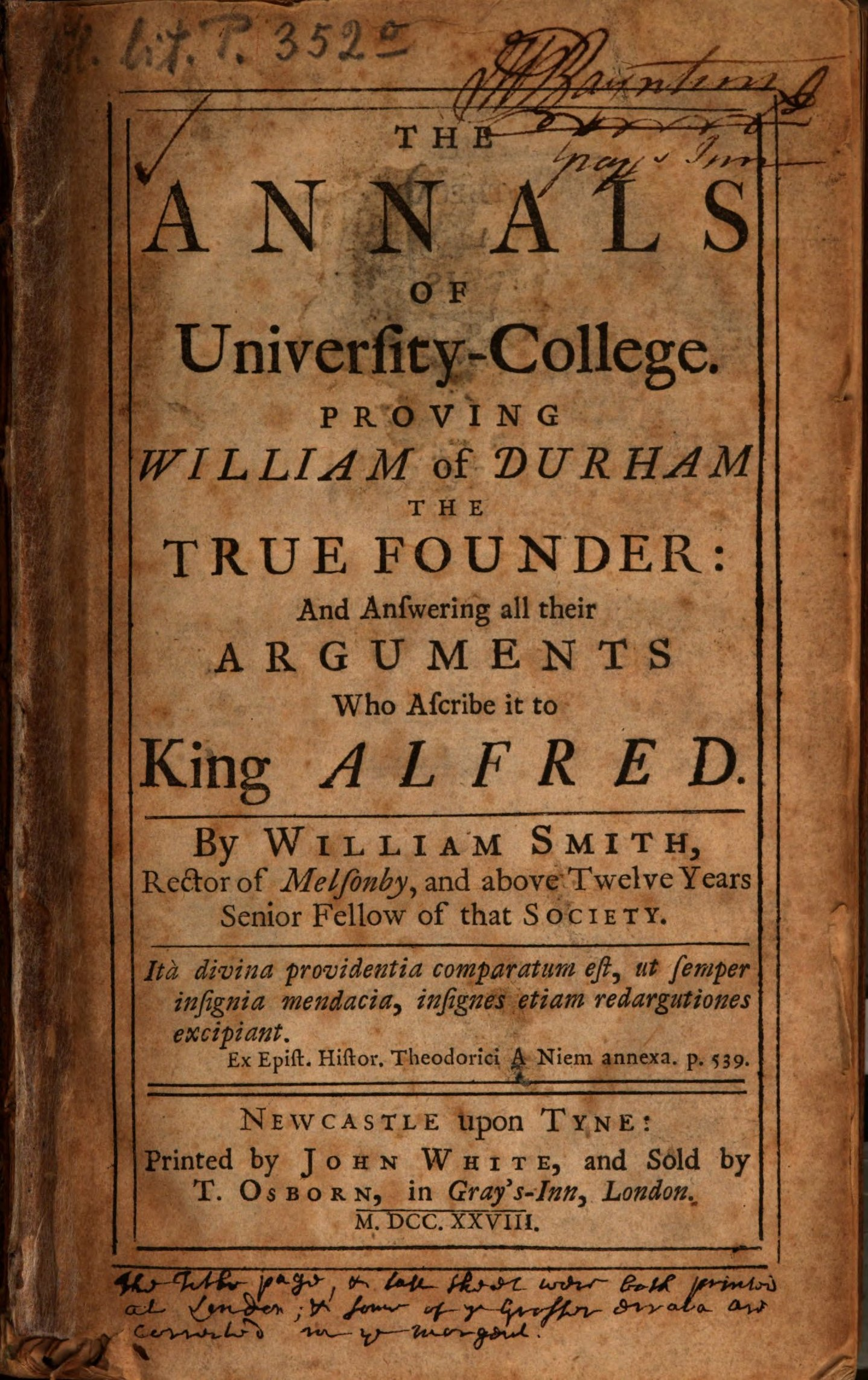
William Smith, The Annals of University College (1728).

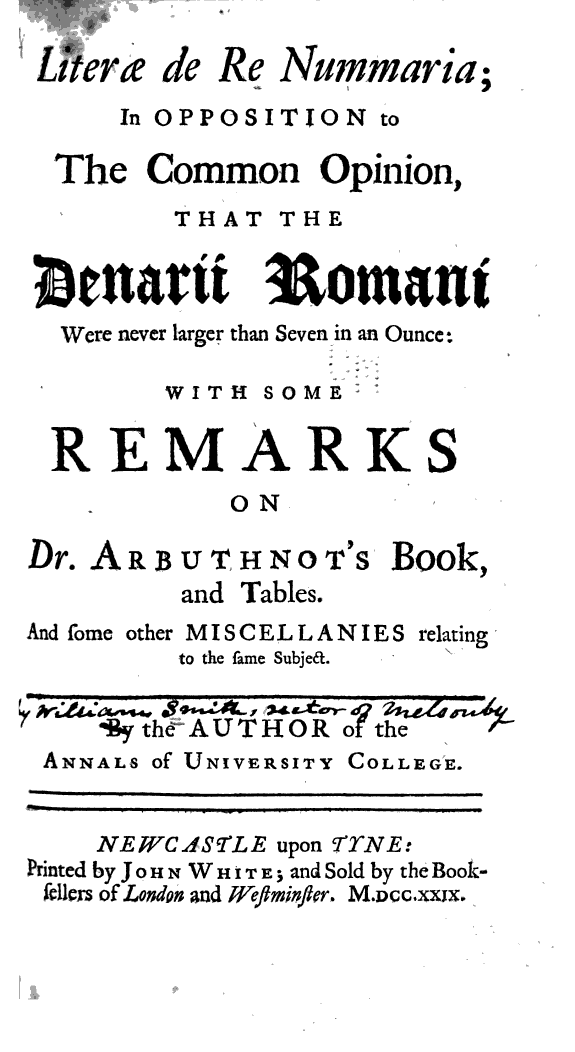
William Smith, Litteræ de Re Nummaria (1729)

William Smith's two published works, both composed near the end of his life.

Reverend William Smith (c. 1653 – December 1735) was an English antiquary responsible for the cataloguing of the archives of University College, Oxford, and composing an original and controversial history of the college, The Annals of University College. Smith was a Fellow of Oxford University, from 1675 to 1704, and then the rector of Melsonby, from 1704 to 1735.

Born in Easby, Richmondshire, Smith attended University College, Oxford from 1668 to 1678, gaining a BA and MA. Soon after elected a fellow of the college, Smith set about organizing, cataloguing and transcribing the contents of the college archives, creating archival resources still in use today. After a scandalous marriage as a fellow, Smith moved the college to purchase the living of Melsonby, and was appointed to its rectorship in 1704. There he lived for the rest of his life, corresponding with antiquaries and keeping abreast of the politics of University College.

In one controversy a Master of the college rested his legitimacy on an apocryphal claim that King Alfred had founded University College. This inflamed Smith sufficiently that he set about writing a history of the college refuting these medieval claims, much to the chagrin of those who were personally invested in the myths. The resultant work, The Annals of University College (1728), has been called by scholars both "maddening" and "chaotic", but also "the first scholarly history [...] of any Oxford or Cambridge college" and a "most honest and accurate" work. Smith composed one more book, in 1729, on the composition of the Roman denarii and embarked on several constructions in Easby, before dying in Melsonby in December 1735.

== Early life and education ==
William Smith was born around 1653, as one of three children of Anne (d. 5 November 1691) and William Smith (d. 28 May 1713) of Easby. Anne was the daughter of Francis Layton, Master of the Jewel House in Charles I's reign, and Margaret, née Brown. He was likely educated at the nearby Richmond Grammar School and matriculated from University College on 28 May 1668. He graduated with a BA in 1672, proceeding with an MA on 18 March 1675. He was soon after elected a fellow of University College. In 1678, he was given an MA at Cambridge, and made senior fellow, a post which he maintained for twelve years, refusing the position of Master. He seems not to have been popular during his time at Oxford, as the diarist Thomas Hearne reminisced that 'this Smith, when of Oxford, used to be called (from his dark muddy head) Puzzle Cause and often Old Crust'.

== Fellowship at Oxford and University College archives ==
While completing his tenure as an Oxford fellow, Smith stumbled across the poorly organized archives of University College. University College, founded in 1249, had made no attempt to catalogue its contents up until the late 17th-century. Obadiah Walker, Master of University College (1676–89), had instituted a short-lived pigeonhole system, and, in the 1690s, Hugh Todd, a Cumberland antiquarian, made a faulty attempt at cataloguing the archives, which Smith later characterized as "without any Coherence or Dependance", and was quickly distracted by a clerical career in his home county. In his antiquarian passion, Smith went about cataloguing, copying, abstracting, and sorting all of the college's documents. To catalogue the various deeds, Smith created an almost modern archival system, with three hierarchical levels: fonds (as he called them, "Pyxides"), series ("fascicula"), and items (i.e. the individual documents). In the view of Robin Darwall-Smith and Michel Riordan, this was a "much more modern system of arranging documents than any of his predecessors so far encountered", though his ideal archival system stumbled when his "Pyxides" (which were each separated by physical boxes in the archive) could not hold all the documents in a fond, and so had to be awkwardly separated.

Smith, as he combed through the university archives, abstracted or transcribed every manuscript he sorted, keeping his records in several volumes of personal notes. Smith's talents for paleography, deciphering ancient texts, and accurately recording their contents (including parts he found illegible, and now-broken seals) has left all later college scholars "deeply in debt" to his work, according to the current college archivist, Darwall-Smith, especially where the modern forms of these manuscripts are now illegible. Smith's transcripts also reveal his occasional mishandling of the documents, including the damaging of some fragile seals and the use of 'water of gall' on some hard to read manuscripts, a solution that made letters darker on parchment, but gradually darkened the whole manuscript, so that several manuscripts described by Smith are now unusable and unreadable brown sheets. Smith, rather than leave his transcripts in the college's possession, kept them in his personal collection, for use in his historical research.

Smith's contemporaries believed he did not marry until the conclusion of his fellowship, but, as Thomas Hearne had rumoured and recent research has shown, Smith secretly married while a fellow, in disregard of the contrary rule. He was issued an archbishop's marriage license on 29 January 1697, for the marriage of himself ("aged about 44 years") and Mary Greenwood of Oving, Buckinghamshire, widow of Gerard Langbaine. In 1692, their son William, once thought to be Langbaine's child, was born. Smith kept this family in secret until the end of his fellowship, and his move to Melsonby.

== Rectorship at Melsonby and Annals ==
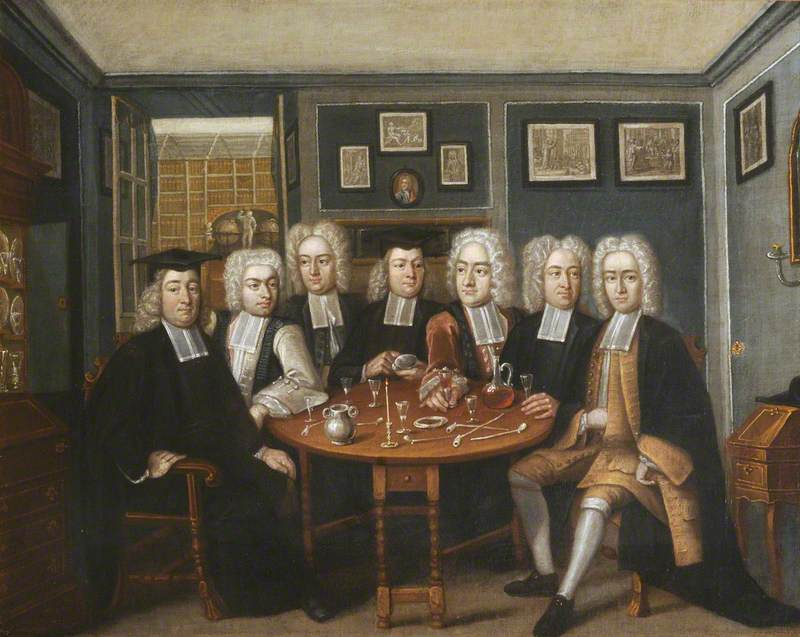
Portrait of Thomas and John Cockman and some Fellows of University College, by Benjamin Ferrers. Depicting Thomas Cockman (centre), with his brother John (far left) and the five University College fellows who sided with Cockman in the 1722 election, sitting in the old Master's Lodgings. This painting was commissioned by John Cockman in celebration of the fellows' victory.

In 1704, Smith was appointed rector of Melsonby, North Yorkshire, a small village situated near Richmondshire and the Great North Road. The advowson (or 'living') of Melsonby had been purchased by University College shortly before, certainly due to the influence of Smith, as a local of the area. At his own expense, he built a rectory-house for himself and future incumbents, and was described, while in office, as being punctual in the completion of his ecclesiastical duties. While he completed these duties, Smith kept up correspondence with antiquaries, including Ralph Thoresby and Henry Bourne, and his college fellows, keeping abreast of university politics. One such event was a controversy surrounding the Mastership of University College, wherein two Masters - Thomas Cockman and William Dennison - had both been admitted into office in 1722 in contesting elections, leading to a conflict between their respective supporters. When the vice-chancellor of Oxford decided in favour of Dennison, Cockman's supporters held that only the Crown, as 'Visitor of the College', could determine the result of the election, citing an apocryphal medieval claim that University College had been founded by King Alfred the Great, a claim backed by Anthony Wood, and held by the Court of King's Bench in 1727.

This claim stirred Smith immensely, as he protested ineffectually against the court's ahistorical judgement from the king's bench. This question as to the college's origins, set Smith on the task of composing The Annals of University College, (Note: The full title was: The Annals of University College: Proving William of Durham the True Founder: and Answering All Their Arguments who Ascribe it to King Alfred) a broad-ranging history of the college, particularly utilizing his erudition of the college archives to prove William of Durham as the true founder of University College. The Annals were published in 1728, too late to influence the court, which had already decided in Cockman's favour, but the book still received a cold reception from Cockman's supporters. Though Smith himself had no partisan affiliations, his book was taken to be strongly in favour of Dennison, attacking the royal argument and upholding the vice-chancellor's judgement. Cockman dismissed the book as "the private opinion of a partial disgusted old man, who was always famous for opposition and confounding things". Thomas Hearne, who was personally committed to this Alfredian myth, repudiated the book as a "Rhapsody of Lyes" to fellow antiquaries, accusing Smith of "making everything spurious that happens to be against himself". For a century Smith's scholarship "made not the slightest difference to the pride which the University continued to take in its Alfredian identity", according to Simon Keynes.

Ultimately, The Annals proved to be an influential and widely respected Oxford history. Darwall-Smith and Riordan hailed it as "the first scholarly history, not just of University College, but of any Oxford or Cambridge college". William Carr praised Smith as "that most honest and accurate of workers among past records, at a crisis in the College history, feeling himself bound to support a view which he believed to be just".

While being commended for its academic historiography, The Annals have come to be criticized as poorly structured and obviously rushed. Being composed in a hurry following the court's decision, Smith diverts the book several times with increasingly unrelated erudite digressions. Darwall-Smith and Riordan have called it a "a maddening work, resembling a non-fictional Tristram Shandy". Former Master of University College, Robin Butler, summed the work up as a "brilliant, if chaotic, account" of the college's history.

== Other activities in Melsonby and Easby, and death ==
Smith's two constructions in Easby

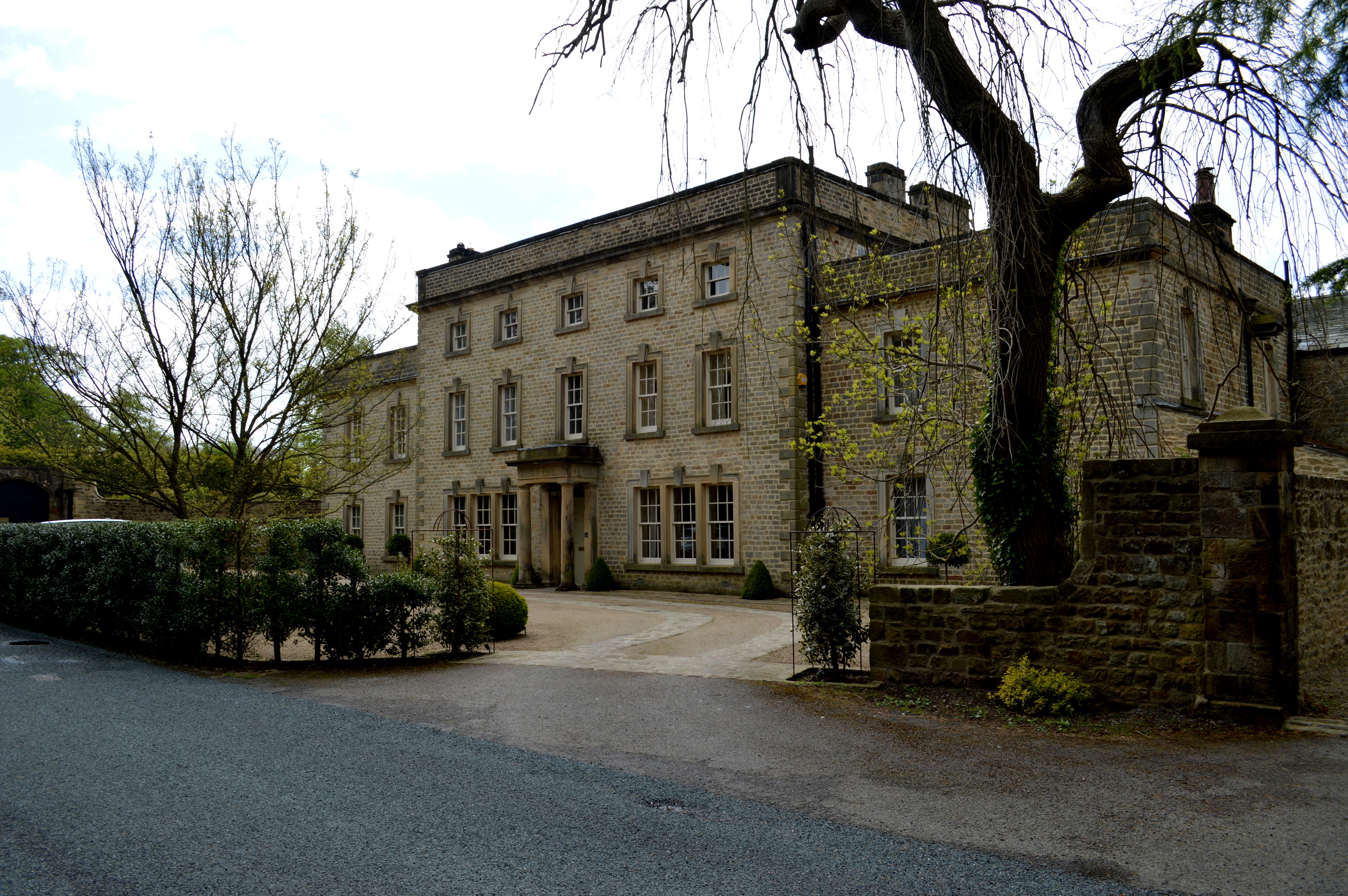
The front façade of Easby Hall, Richmond.

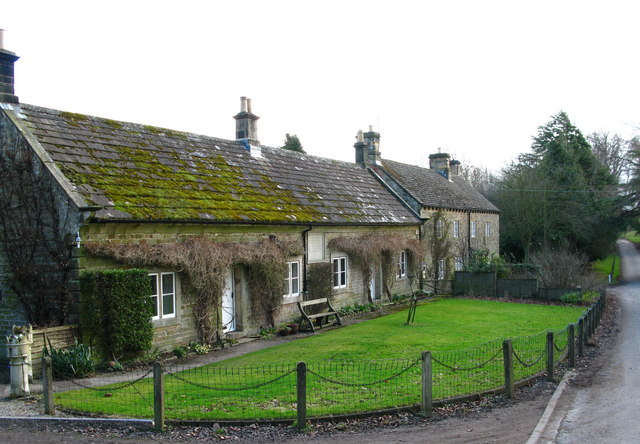
Almhouses in Easby, founded by Smith.

William Smith had aimed to write a treatise on the changes in the weight and value of money, but he was preempted by William Fleetwood's Chronicon Preciosum of 1707. Smith remained bitter about this, writing to his friend Thoresby that he didn't believe "[Fleetwood] has one quotation that I had not by me before, and I believe that I have double the number [of quotations] that are to be found in his book". In 1729, he published his own work on numismatics, Litteræ de Re Nummaria, in opposition to the common opinion that the Roman denarii were never larger than seven in an ounce, with some remarks on Dr. Arbuthnot’s Book and Tables, and some other miscellanies relating to the same subject, (Note: The book referred to in the title is John Arbuthnot's Tables of Ancient Coins, Weights and Measures.) a work consisting of letters between him and Thoresby on various subjects relating to coinage. In this period, Smith also undertook some constructions in Easby. In September 1732, Smith funded the erection of some almshouses in Easby, sometimes known collectively as 'Smith's Hospital', which were built to house four poor citizens and, as he requested to his descendants, a schoolmaster, in two rooms. In 1729, Smith purchased some lands in Easby and, in 1730, built Easby Hall, a Polite Georgian mansion, adjacent to the local ruins of Easby Abbey. The house incorporates two public façades, displaying its owner's wealth and architectural taste. Both buildings are now listed (the almshouses at Grade II and the hall at Grade II*) and have been described by the local council as "form[ing] the nucleus of the village", alongside the Easby Mullions.

William Smith died at Melsonby, sometime in December 1735, and was buried on 6 December, as the local burial register records. His volumes of transcripts, excerpts, and armorials, which he had collected in University College, were kept in the family, and passed on through his nephew, Thomas Smith of Easby, who sold them to a local schoolmaster, Thomas Wilson, eventually coming into the hands of a Miss Croft of York, Wilson's relative. Eleven volumes were sold on to University College, for a sum of £21 in 1743, and the remaining manuscripts were purchased by antiquary George Allan, subsequently bound into twenty-eight volumes, and gifted to the Society of Antiquaries of London in 1798. An oil portrait was painted of Smith, gifted to the Melsonby rectory in 1796 by Thomas Zouch, and given to University College by Rev. J. V. Bullard, Vicar of Melsonby, in 1920, where it still resides, as of 2013.

== Sources ==
- Butler, Robin (2008). "A New History of Univ". Univ Newsletter (29): 1.
- Carr, William (1902). University College. University of Oxford College Histories. London: F. E. Robinson & Co.
- Carlyle, Edward Irving (1898). "Smith, William (1651?-1735)" . In Lee, Sidney (ed.). Dictionary of National Biography. Vol. 53. London: Smith, Elder & Co.
- Darwall-Smith, Robin; Riordan, Michael (2009). "Archives for Administrators or Archives for Antiquarians? A History of Archive Cataloguing in Four Oxford Colleges". Journal of the Society of Archivists. 30 (1): 93–115. doi:10.1080/00379810903264641. S2CID 109139539. (Subscription required.)
- Darwall-Smith, Robert (2015). "Introduction". In Darwall-Smith, Robert (ed.). Early Records of University College, Oxford. Suffolk, UK: Boydell & Brewer. pp. xiii–xxi. ISBN 9780904107272.
- Darwall-Smith, Robert (2017a). "Papers of Thomas Cockman (Master 1722–1745)" (PDF). Univ Online Catalogues.
- Darwall-Smith, Robert (2017b). "The Living of Melsonby, Yorkshire, 1572-1935" (PDF). Univ Online Catalogues.
- E. H. A. (1853). "The Rev. William Smith of Melsonby". The Gentleman's Magazine. 2nd (New) series. 40: 163–4.
- Keynes, Simon (1999). "The Cult of King Alfred the Great". Anglo-Saxon England. 28: 225–356. doi:10.1017/S0263675100002337. JSTOR 44512350. (Subscription required.)
- McConnell, Anita (2013). "Smith, William". Oxford Dictionary of National Biography (online ed.). Oxford University Press. doi:10.1093/ref:odnb/25927. (Subscription, Wikipedia Library access or UK public library membership required.)
- "Easby: Conservation Area Appraisal and Management Plan" (PDF). Richmond District Council. 2007.
- "Catalogue description: SAL/MS/72/1-27/B". The National Archives.
