= The Annals of University College =

1728 book by William Smith

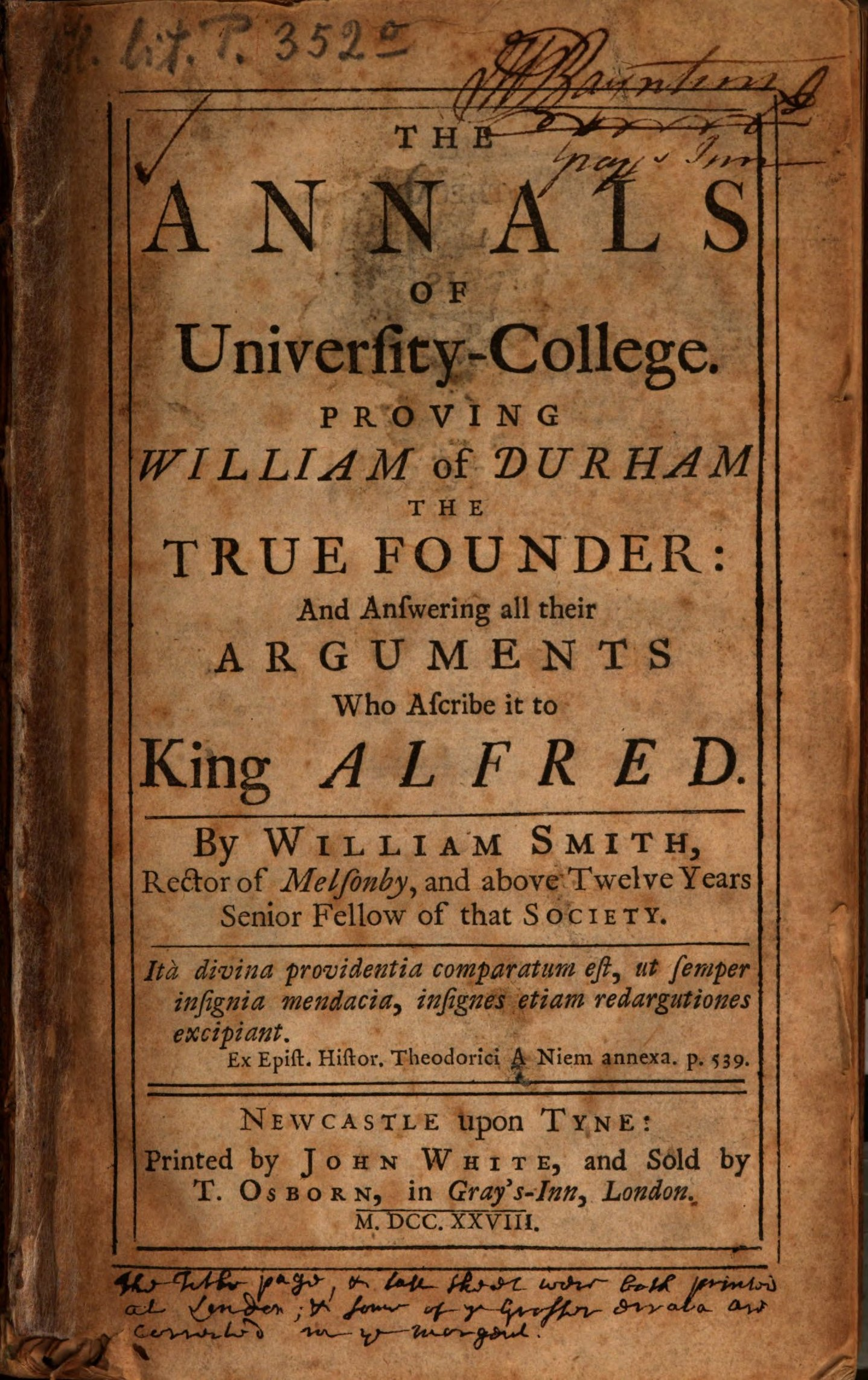
- The title page of the original 1728 edition
- Author: William Smith
- Genre: History of education
- Published: Newcastle-upon-Tyne, 1728
- Publication place: England
- Pages: 376

The Annals of University College. Proving William of Durham the True Founder: and Answering all their Arguments who Ascribe it to King Alfred (Note: This title is given in the front page of the 1728 edition. An alternate title is given on page 1: The Annals of University College in Oxford or, A True Account of the Rise, Progress, Settlement, Benefactors and Misfortunes of that Society.) is a 1728 book on the history of University College, Oxford by the college archivist and antiquary William Smith. The book, controversial upon its release, has since been hailed as a remarkable, and exceptionally scholarly, early work of college history.

The book, composed while Smith was retired in Melsonby and riddled with gout, was provoked by a controversy over the Mastership of University College. A botched election had led to a dispute over whom had visitational authority over the college, and therefore the last say in its elections, with one party claiming that only the Crown had such an authority, citing a widely believed medieval myth of King Alfred founding University College. This ahistorical claim incensed Smith so much that, in his distant Melsonby rectory, he produced the Annals, with the express purpose of proving William of Durham to be the genuine founder. The book was published too late to affect the dispute's result, and Smith's arguments were overlooked by the Court.

The book was met with cold reception initially, especially from those personally invested in the Alfredian myth, with harsh reviews describing it as "the private opinion of a partial disgusted old man". For a century, the book elicited little notice, and "made not the slightest difference to the pride which the University continued to take in its Alfredian identity", as the college's foundations continued to be attributed to Alfred in the histories of Hume and de Rapin. By the 20th-century, the book finally came to be regarded as "a remarkable achievement" and "the first scholarly history [...] of any Oxford or Cambridge college", if also "maddening" and "confused" in its style.

== Background ==
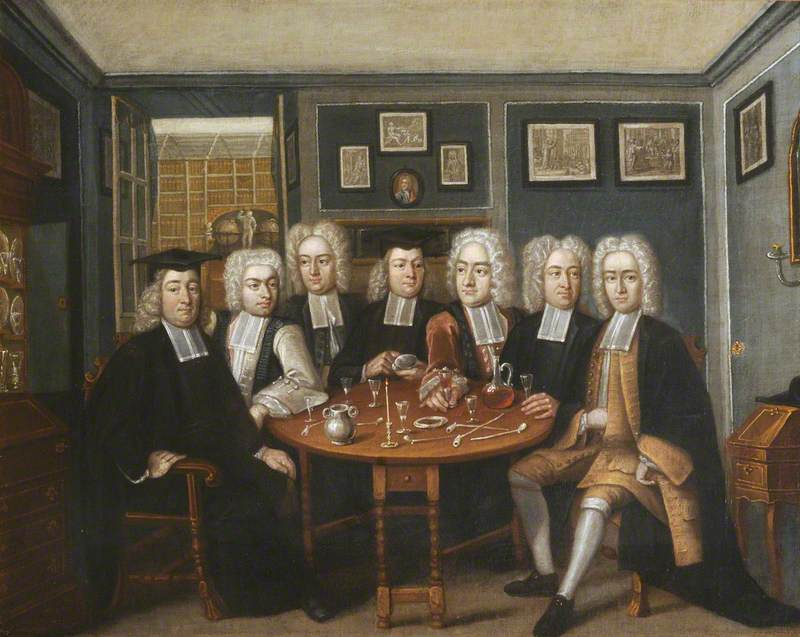
Portrait of Thomas and John Cockman and some Fellows of University College, by Benjamin Ferrers (University College, Oxford). Thomas Cockman (centre), with his brother John (far left) and five college Fellows who sided with Cockman in the 1722 election. This painting was commissioned by John Cockman in celebration of the Fellows' victory over Dennison.

Reverend William Smith (c. 1653–1735) was born in Easby, Richmondshire to the locals, William and Anne Smith. In 1668, he matriculated from University College, Oxford, going on to obtain an MA and BA. In 1678, following shortly from his MA, he was elected a Fellow of the College. Here he gained a reputation as a hard man to work with and a "puzzle cause", according to Thomas Hearne. While still at Oxford, he came across disorganised and poorly recorded archives of University College, and promptly set about cataloguing and transcribing the college's large collection of documents. According to the college's archivist Robin Darwall-Smith, Smith's system of cataloguing was "much more modern system [...] than any of his predecessors so far encountered" and his diligent transcribing of the college's documents, many of which are now illegible or lost, has left future scholars "deeply in debt" to his work. Thomas Hearne rumoured that, while a Fellow, Smith secretly married and had a child, in blatant disregard of the university rules. Later research has revealed this claim to be true, with Smith marrying Mary Greenwood in 1697, and having a child, William (previously thought to be from Mary's first marriage), in 1692. Smith pushed for the college purchase of the advowson (or 'living') of Melsonby, and was appointed to its rectorship in 1704, where he remained, with his family, for the rest of his life.

While in Melsonby, Smith corresponded with fellow antiquaries and continued to brief himself on the affairs of his former college. One college controversy that caught his eye was over the Mastership of University College, between two Fellows: Thomas Cockman and William Dennison. Upon the death of the unpopular previous Master, Arthur Charlett (in office, 1692–1722), a profound divide emerged between the Northern and Southern Fellows with regards to who should be the next Master. On 4 December 1722, an election was held, wherein Cockman (the Southern candidate) was elected by a bare majority. The Northerners (supporting Dennison) complained the election was contrary to the statutes of the college, and held their own election on 17 December, in absence of the senior Fellow, where Dennison was elected. Neither group would yield to the other's result, so the vice-chancellor, Robert Shippen, and doctors of Oxford were called upon by both parties to make decide in favour of one candidate.

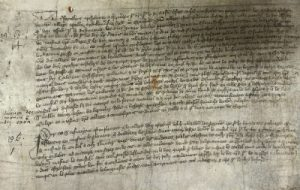
The University College's 1384 'French petition' to Richard II, and source of the college's Alfredian myth.

The vice-chancellor and doctors made their decision in favour of Dennison, but Cockman's supporters did not relent. Citing an apocryphal medieval legend that King Alfred had founded University College in 872, they declared that only the Crown, as 'Visitor of the College', could determine the right of election, as opposed to the university convocation they had appealed to earlier. This myth originates in a 1384 "French petition" to King Richard II, concerning a major property dispute which the College wished to be heard in the King's Council. The document appealed to the young Richard's interest in his genealogy with invented claims as to Alfred's part in founding the college, and successfully persuaded the Council to hear the case; the Alfredian myth perpetuated onward subsequently. He continued to be cited as the founder well into the 18th century, with many imaginative portraits of Alfred gifted to the college and financial donations citing this myth. Cockman's petition came before the Solicitor and Attorney General, who moved to a 'prohibition' in the Court of King's Bench. Long delays ensued from the Court, as the college continued headless for five years, until 10 May 1727 when the case was finally heard before the judges and jury of the Court. This Court declared in favour of Cockman, uncritically affirming the Alfredian myth and declaring that the convocation of Oxford did not exert visitational authority, a result which William Smith protested ineffectually from the King's bench.

Smith, so perturbed by this judgement, set about writing The Annals of University College in his remote Melsonby rectory. The book was written with the express purpose of refuting the Alfredian myth which had so propagated itself and therefore maintaining that the university convocation still held visitational authority, though Smith was unconcerned with any partisan affiliation to the candidates. While composing the book, Smith made much use of the transcripts in his personal collection, which put him a good position to consult the true deeds and statutes of the college for his history. Smith rushed the work to completion, recalling that his sheets 'went from me to the Press as fast as I writ it', while his work was 'hastened by gout' in his feet and hands, as he attempted to get the work printed in time to appeal before the Court. This hope was, unfortunately, unfulfilled, as it was published in 1728, too late to influence the Court's decision. On 29 April 1729, the Crown visited the college, and declared in favour of Cockman, settling the dispute once and for all, again disregarding Smith's protests.

== Content ==
It may seem a Wonder both to those that know me, and those that know me not, that a Person who has lived in Privacy and Obscurity to the 77th year of his Age, (Note: At the time of the preface's writing, 17 November 1727, Smith would have actually been 74/5 years old. This is based on the date supplied in his marriage license of 29 January 1697, as being 'aged about 44 years' at the time.) and is so bowed down by infirmities, as not to have feet to walk on or hardly an hand to write, should begin now, at this Age, and under these bad Circumstances, to trouble the World with any thing that can proceed from such Weaknesses: but the Scripture: informs us, that there are some Sort of Sins 'That will make the Stones cry out of the wall, and the Beam out of the Timber answer it,' (Habakkuk 2:11) before they shall lye bid, or remain undiscovered.

— William Smith, 'Preface' of the Annals, discussing the Alfredian myth.

Smith begins with a preface, composed on 17 November 1727, lamenting his many ills at such an advanced age, the lies of Alfred's foundation (which he blames as being perpetuated by Charlett), and recounting the sequence of events that led him to write this book. The first chapter looks at, what Smith terms, the "founding, settlement, [and] progress" of the college. He acquaints the reader with the circumstances surrounding William of Durham's founding of University College, including his life and the use to which his foundational donation was put. Next, he considers the arguments used to allege Alfred as the founder, and systematically discredits them, showing how the falsehood began in misinterpretations of documents, "only feigned to serve a turn". In the following chapter, Smith discusses Richard's connections with the college, through its aforementioned petition to him. Smith discusses the statutes of the university at length, especially in relation to claims of Alfred's involvement in them. Throughout the work, Smith discusses the archives of University College, which he was so acquainted with, including the previous archival system, created by Hugh Todd, which he disparages as "without any Coherence or Dependance".

== Reception and legacy ==
Initially, the book met with a cold reception among Oxford Fellows. Though the author had no political motivations, and was a personal friend of both candidates, the book quickly came to be seen as an attack on Cockman's legitimacy. Cockman himself responded unsympathetically, dismissing it as "the private opinion of a partial disgusted old man, who was always famous for opposition and confounding things". Thomas Hearne, a particular devotee of the college's founding myth, found Smith's conclusions hard to accept, denigrating them as "a studied Rhapsody of Lyes" to fellow antiquaries, and accusing Smith of making "every thing spurious that happens to be against himself" and disregarding established historical authorities. (Note: Hearne commented on Smith extensively: see, Hearne 1728, pp. 27–29, 33; E. H. A. 1853.) Eventually, the book's conclusions on the Alfredian myth would be understood as inescapably true, but for a century the book "made not the slightest difference to the pride which the University continued to take in its Alfredian identity", according to Simon Keynes, as the Alfredian myth continued to be uncritically reproduced by popular historians such as David Hume and Paul de Rapin. According to Darwall-Smith, the "last hurrah" of the myth took place on the 1872 "Millenary Dinner", grandly celebrating a thousand years since Alfred's alleged foundation of the college. In 1949, the 700th-anniversary of the William of Durham's true founding of University College was finally celebrated, and the following Alfredian centennial was duly overlooked.

The book has now come to be hailed as a remarkably scholarly early work of college history. Robin Darwall-Smith and Michael Riordan have lauded it as "the first scholarly history, not just of University College, but of any Oxford or Cambridge college", and "the basis for all further histories of the college". Early-20th-century historian of University College, William Carr, named it "the first Oxford College history of real historical value", still maintaining "its position as an authority to which many writers on early Oxford have since been beholden". Arthur Oswald, in the 1954 Victoria County History of the college, acknowledged his debt to the Annals, summarising it as "a remarkable achievement", affirming that "though such iconoclasm was highly unpopular", "the [Annals'] conclusions were inescapable".

One of the Annals' salient characteristics, commented on by several reviewers, is the total absence of any logical consistency in the book's structure. Perhaps caused by the hurry in which it was produced, Smith constantly distracts himself with more or less unrelated, erudite digressions. Oswald lamented that, while remarkable, the work was "confused in arrangement and the style prolix and circuitous". Darwall-Smith and Riordan have colourfully described it as "a maddening work, resembling a non-fictional Tristram Shandy", wherein "all attempts at a structure break down regularly, as the author is diverted by a succession of digressions". Darwall-Smith, a modern historian of University College, summed it up as "a work distinguished equally by scholarly rigour and its total lack of any coherent structure."

== Sources ==
- Carr, William (1902). University College. University of Oxford College Histories. London: F. E. Robinson & Co.
- Darwall-Smith, Robin; Riordan, Michael (2009). "Archives for Administrators or Archives for Antiquarians? A History of Archive Cataloguing in Four Oxford Colleges". Journal of the Society of Archivists. 30 (1): 93–115. doi:10.1080/00379810903264641. S2CID 109139539. (Subscription required.)
- Darwall-Smith, Robert, ed. (2015). Early Records of University College, Oxford. Suffolk, UK: Boydell & Brewer. ISBN 9780904107272.
- Darwall-Smith, Robert (2017). "Papers of Thomas Cockman (Master 1722–1745)" (PDF). Univ Online Catalogues.
- E. H. A. (1853). "The Rev. William Smith of Melsonby". The Gentleman's Magazine. 2nd (New) series. 40: 163–4.
- Hearne, Thomas (1915) [1728]. Salter, H. E. (ed.). Remarks and Collections of Thomas Hearne, Vol. X: March 27, 1728—December 8, 1731. Oxford Historical Society. Oxford: Clarendon Press.
- Keynes, Simon (1999). "The Cult of King Alfred the Great". Anglo-Saxon England. 28: 225–356. doi:10.1017/S0263675100002337. JSTOR 44512350. (Subscription required.)
- McConnell, Anita (2013). "Smith, William". Oxford Dictionary of National Biography (online ed.). Oxford University Press. doi:10.1093/ref:odnb/25927. (Subscription, Wikipedia Library access or UK public library membership required.)
- Oswald, Arthur (1954). "University College". In Lobel, Mary D.; Salter, H. E. (eds.). A History of the County of Oxford: Volume 3, the University of Oxford. Victoria County History. London: Oxford University Press. pp. 61–81.
- Smith, William (1728). The Annals of University College. Newcastle-upon-Tyne: John White.
- "King Alfred and Univ – part 1". University College Oxford: News and Events. 14 July 2015.
