= Gouraud =

Gouraud may refer to:

- Aimee Gouraud, better known as Aimée Crocker (1864–1941) American heiress and adventuress
- François Fauvel Gouraud (1808–1847), French expert on daguerreotypes
- George Edward Gouraud (1842–1912), American phonograph recording pioneer
- Henri Gouraud (general) (1867–1946), French World War I general
  - Henri Gouraud (computer scientist) (born 1944) from France, nephew of the general
- Violette Gouraud-Morris (1893–1944), French athlete

== See also ==
- Gouraud shading, a shading algorithm invented by the computer scientist Henri Gouraud
- Fort Gouraud
- Rue Gouraud in Lebanon
