= William Beveridge (bishop) =

English bishop

The Right Reverend William Beveridge
- Bishop of St Asaph
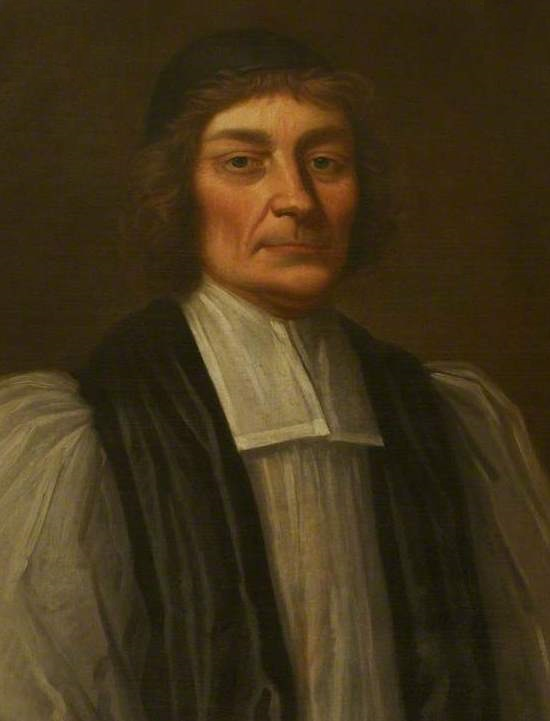
- William Beveridge, posthumous portrait by Benjamin Ferrers
- Diocese: Diocese of St Asaph
- In office: 1704–1708 (death)
- Predecessor: John Thomas
- Successor: William Fleetwood
- Other post: Archdeacon of Colchester (1681–1704)

Personal details
- Born: baptized 21 February 1637 Barrow upon Soar, Leicestershire
- Died: 5 March 1708 (aged 71) Westminster Abbey, London
- Denomination: Anglican
- Profession: Clergyman, author
- Education: Oakham School; St John's College, Cambridge

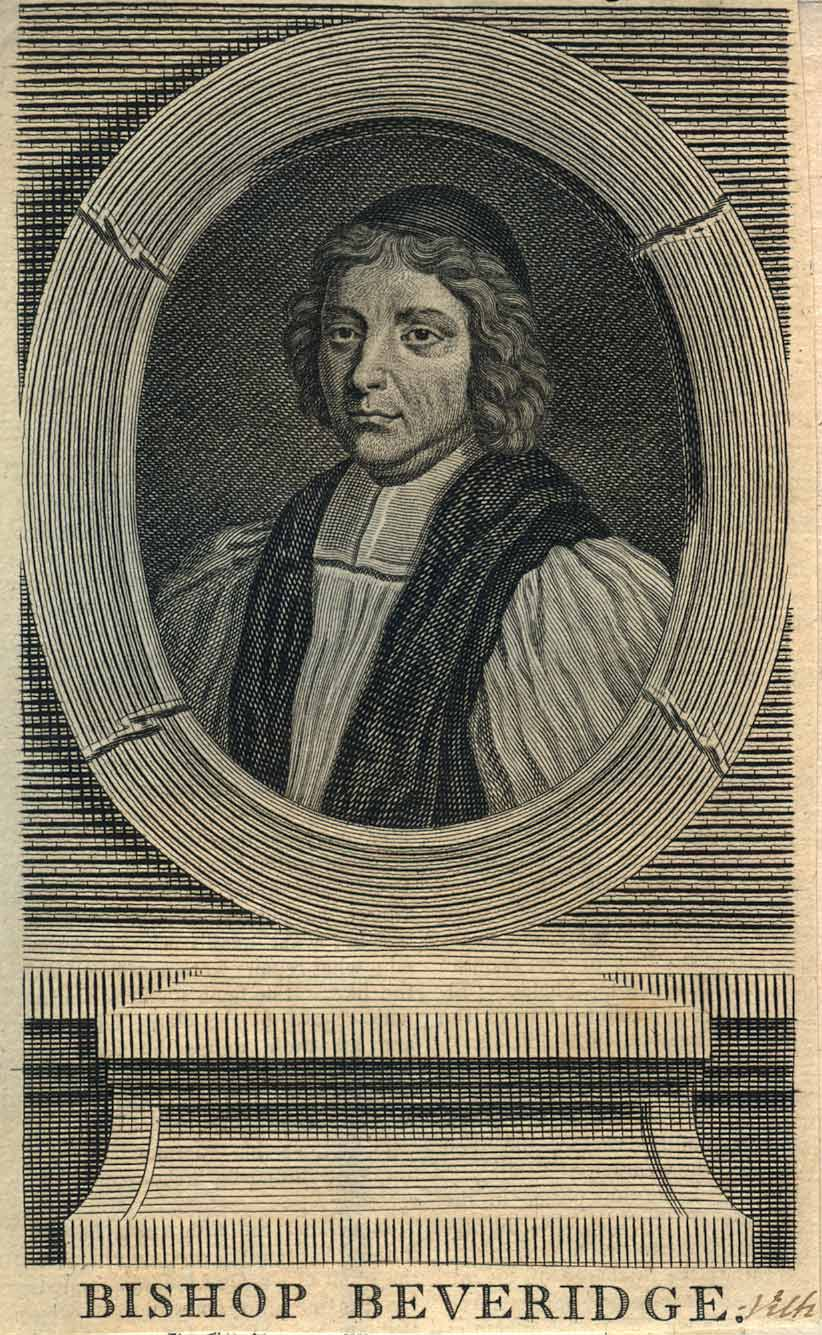

William Beveridge (1637 – 5 March 1708) was an English writer and clergyman who served as Bishop of St Asaph from 1704 until his death.

== Life ==
Son of the Rev. William Beveridge, B.D., he was born at Barrow, near Leicester, and baptised on 21 February 1637 at Barrow, Leicestershire, of which his grandfather, father, and elder brother John were successively vicars. He was first taught by his learned father and for two years was sent to Oakham School, Rutland, where William Cave was his schoolfellow.

On 24 May 1653, he was admitted a sizar in St John's College, Cambridge, with Bullingham as his tutor. Dr. Anthony Tuckney was then head of the college and took a special interest in young Beveridge. Beveridge especially devoted himself to the learned languages, including the oriental. In his twenty-first year, he published a Latin treatise on the Excellency and Use of the Oriental Tongues, especially Hebrew, Chaldee, Syriac, and Samaritan, together with a Grammar of the Syriac Language, (1658; 2nd ed. 1664). In 1656, he proceeded H.A., and in 1660 M.A. On 3 January 1660-1, he was ordained deacon by Dr. Robert Sanderson, Bishop of Lincoln.

He was rector of Ealing, 1661–1672, and of St. Peter's, Cornhill, London, 1672–1704, when he became bishop. On 22 December 1674, he was collated to the prebend of Chiswick in St. Paul's, London. In 1679 he proceeded D.D. On 3 November 1681, he was appointed Archdeacon of Colchester. On 27 November 1681 he preached a sermon on the Excellency and Usefulness of the Common Prayer. It rapidly went through four editions. In 1683 he preached another popular sermon on the anniversary of the Great Fire of London in 1666. On 5 November 1684, he was made prebendary of Canterbury in succession to Peter du Moulin. In 1687–88 he joined with Dr. Horneck and others in forming religious societies for 'reformation of manners.' In 1689 he became president of Sion College. He was installed bishop of St. Asaph on 16 July 1704.

He died in apartments in the cloisters of Westminster Abbey in London on 5 March 1708.

During his lifetime Beveridge refused to sit for his portrait, but following his death Benjamin Ferrers, a relative, painted one, now in the Bodleian Library, Oxford, from his corpse.

== Works ==
In his day he was styled "the great reviver and restorer of primitive piety" because in his sermons and other writings, he dwelt on the Church of the early centuries. His collected works (incomplete) are in the Library of Anglo-Catholic Theology in 12 volumes (Oxford, 1842–48). They contain six volumes of sermons, and in addition:

- The Doctrine of the Church of England Consonant to Scripture, Reason, and the Fathers: A Complete System of Divinity (2 vols.);
- Συνοδικόν, sive pandectae canonum ss. Apostolorum, et conciliorum ab ecclesia Graeca receptorum; nec non canonicarum ss. patrum epistolarum; nec non canonicarum SS. patrum epistolarum: una cum scholiis antiquorum singulis eorum annexis, et scriptis aliis huc spectantibus; ... Totum opus in duos tomos divisum Guilielmus Beveregius ... recensuit, prolegomenis munivit, & annotationibus auxit. Codex canonum ecclesiæ primitivæ vindicatus ac illustratus, with the appendices, I. Prolegomena in Συνοδικὸν, sive pandectas canonum; and II. Præfatio ad annotationes in canones apostolicos (2 vols.);
- Private Thoughts on Religion, and Church Catechism Explained.

His Institutionum chronotogicarum libri duo, una cum totidem arithmetices chronologicæ libellis (London, 1669) was once an admired treatise on chronology. In it, he also includes a full explanation of the Chinese remainder theorem for the case in which the moduli are relatively prime. This was the first general proof of the ta-yen rule. It is also said by Francis Fauvel Gouraud that a discussion on Hebrew linguistics inspired Richard Grey to create his system of mnemotechniques which later evolved into the Mnemonic major system.

Church of England titles
Preceded by William Sill	Archdeacon of Colchester; 1681–1704	Succeeded by Jonas Warley
Preceded by George Hooper	Bishop of St Asaph; 1704–1708	Succeeded by William Fleetwood
