= Jacques I (disambiguation) =

Jacques I may refer to:

- Jacques I, Prince of Monaco (1689–1751), the Prince of Monaco
- Jacques I, Emperor of Haiti (1758–1806), the Emperor of Haiti

Pretenders

- Prince Jaime, Duke of Anjou and Madrid (1870–1931), the Duke of Madrid and Legitimist pretender to the defunct French throne as "Jacques I"

Self-proclaimed monarchs

- Jacques Lebaudy (1868-1919), the self-proclaimed "Emperor of the Sahara"
