= Jacques Lebaudy =

French eccentric (1868–1919)

- Commander of the Faithful, King of Tarfaia, Duke of Arleuf and Prince of Chal-Huin
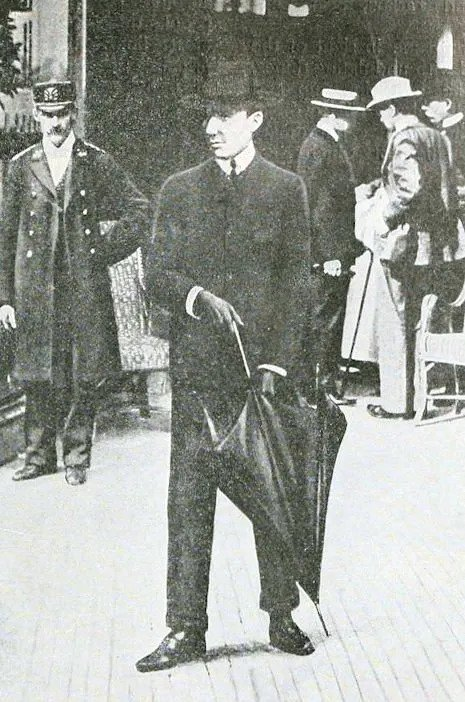
- A 1904 photograph of Lebaudy

Emperor of the Sahara
- Reign: June 1903 – c. 1904
- Enthronement: 1 January 1904 (planned)
- Predecessor: Empire established
- Successor: Empire dissolved
- Governor-General: George Edward Gouraud
- Born: Jacques Lebaudy; 1868; France
- Died: 11 January 1919 (aged 50–51); Westbury, Long Island, New York, US
- Burial: 17 January 1919; Cemetery of the Holy Rood
- Spouse: Marguerite Augustine Doliere
- Issue: Jaqueline Lebaudy
Regnal name
- Jacques I
- House: Lebaudy
- Father: Jules Lebaudy
- Mother: Amicie
- Religion: Roman Catholic

Jacques Lebaudy (1868 – 11 January 1919) was a Frenchman from an extremely wealthy family of sugar refiners, known for his eccentricity and his attempt to establish a new nation, the Empire of the Sahara. The circumstances of his death in 1919 in Westbury, Long Island resulted in a sensational grand jury proceeding.

== Family and early life ==
Born in 1868, Jacques Lebaudy was the oldest son of Jules Lebaudy (1828–1892), who with his brother Gustave (1827–1889) owned the family sugar refining business, Lebaudy Frères. Jules also owned property in Paris, including the Théâtre du Vaudeville. Jacques' mother Amicie (1847–1917) founded a charity to provide low-cost housing to the working poor which is still in existence. Lebaudy and his three siblings were reported as inheriting 227 million francs each on the death of their father. The death of Jacques' younger brother Max, aged 21, in a military hospital in 1895 after being conscripted for military service despite a serious illness caused a scandal in France. His brother had allegedly attempted to bribe his way out of the service.

Jacques' cousins Paul and Pierre Lebaudy were notable builders of airships, such as La République.

By the late 1890s Lebaudy had involved himself in breeding race horses.

== The Empire of the Sahara ==
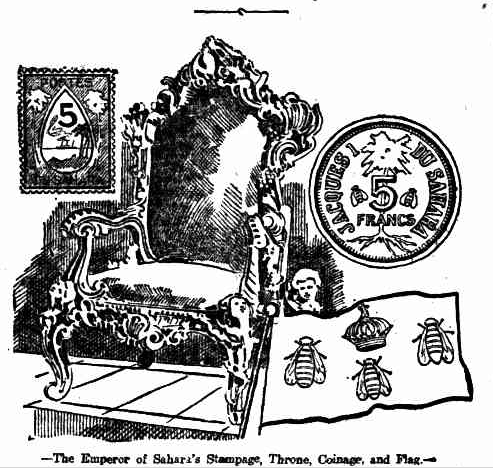
The Emperor of the Sahara's Stampage, Throne, Coinage and Flag

In June 1903, Lebaudy sailed with his yacht Frasquita and two other boats to an area near Cape Juby on the Moroccan coast and proclaimed the "Empire of the Sahara". Backed by as many as 400 hired soldiers and sixteen Hotchkiss guns, Lebaudy established a camp and set up a throne for himself in a large tent, and stated he was now to be known as "Jacques I, Najin-al-Den, Emperor of the Sahara, Commander of the Faithful, King of Tarfaia, Duke of Arleuf and Prince of Chal-Huin". He had various projects for ruling and improving his new domain, but European governments disapproved of his venture, and some of his mercenaries were captured by local Moorish bandits. (They later sued Lebaudy for damages for abandoning them, after being rescued by a French warship). As Spain also had an interest in the area, his attempts at kingdom founding proved politically sensitive to the French government, and in an attempt to put a stop to his ambitions, they issued warrants for his conscription into the French army. He retreated to the Hague to bring his case before an international court. By October 1903 Lebaudy had taken up residence at the Savoy Hotel in London, setting up an imperial court complete with throne and installing his government there, appointing American adventurer George Edward Gouraud as his "Governor-General". Reportedly the orchestra in the Savoy restaurant would play his national anthem whenever he entered to dine under his imperial purple canopy. He also found himself an Empress, former actress Marguerite Augustine Doliere and they produced a daughter, known as "the Princess Jaqueline" After announcing "the throne will remain in the Sahara, with nobody on it; but his Imperial Majesty wishes it to be known that usurpers will be severely dealt with" he left Europe.

== United States ==
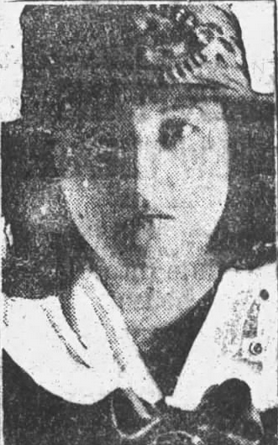
Jacqueline Lebaudy, age 16 (1921)

About 1908, Lebaudy moved to the United States with his wife Augustine and daughter Jacqueline, residing mostly in expensive New York City hotels, and his behavior became more erratic. In 1915 he was placed in an asylum at the request of his wife; he at first fled the local sheriff on horseback, before surrendering but soon escaped, only to be recaptured after a few days. Lebaudy reportedly tried several times to have his wife and daughter killed, and was finally shot and killed by his wife on 11 January 1919 at her home in Westbury on Long Island. A grand jury refused to indict. He left a large estate, having inherited additional portions of the family money from his brother Max and his mother. He also had the reputation, despite his mental problems, of being at times a shrewd investor in stocks and property; he reportedly made a profit of over $1,000,000 in the stock of the Erie Railroad in 1907 when it became the subject of a takeover.

Lebaudy was buried on 17 January 1919, in the Catholic parish cemetery of St. Brigid's, Westbury, now part of the Catholic Cemetery of the Holy Rood.

In 1922, his wife remarried a French detective in a double wedding with her daughter, who married his son.

== In popular culture ==
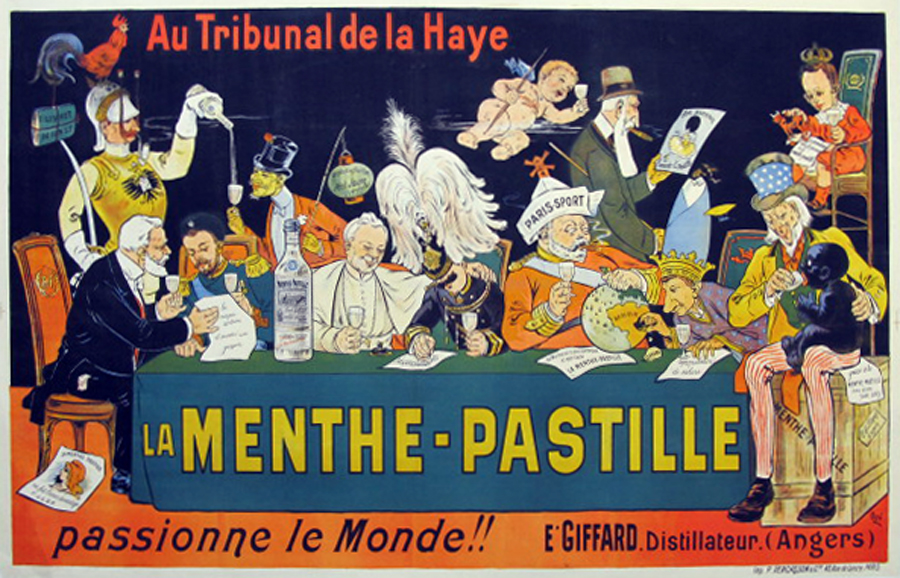
Lebaudy among a group of world leaders; he is the one peering at the area of the Sahara on the globe. Eugène Ogé, 1904

Banner of Arms of the Empire of the Sahara

Lebaudy was the subject of wide public interest, first in France and then worldwide. Caricatures of him include that by Sem and a 1904 poster of world political figures by Eugène Ogé. He was the subject of several lampoons in London publications by the young P. G. Wodehouse. The Romance of Terence O’Rourke, Gentleman Adventurer by Louis Joseph Vance, a pulp novel from 1907 probably based on magazine stories published in 1904, is a romanticized version of the "Empire of the Sahara", with Terence O'Rourke being an American adventurer who is recruited to help a cowardly French millionaire become the "Emperor of the Sahara". Another work on Lebaudy was English artist John Copley's 1909 collection of lithographs "The Fall and Rise of His Imperial Majesty Jacques Démodé". The adventures of Lebaudy even inspired a French game-maker to produce a wire puzzle in his honor.

== Collections ==
The papers of Lebaudy's mother Amicie were transferred to University College London in 1989 after previously being held at Coutts Bank and the Bodelian Library, Oxford. The archive includes correspondence in support of Paul Déroulède and Gabriel Syveton, personal material and documents relating to the Sanatorium du Mont des Oiseaux in Hyères, France.
