= Eugène Ogé =

French lithographer (1861–1936)

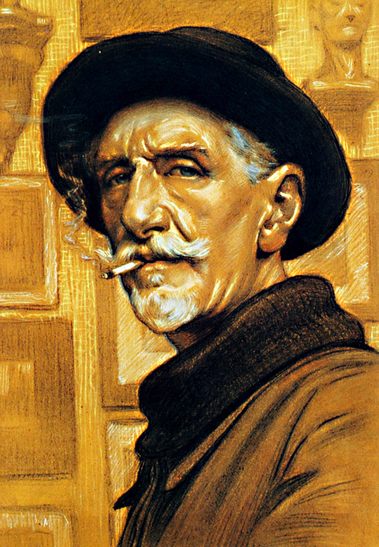
Self-portrait (1926)

Eugène Ogé (5 May 1861, Paris – 24 March 1936, Paris) was a French poster artist and illustrator.

== Biography ==
He began as an apprentice to Charles Verneau (1850-1950), a printer who specialized in posters, and became a lithographer. During this period he made the acquaintance of several notable poster artists, including Adolphe Léon Willette, Jean-Louis Forain and Théophile Alexandre Steinlen. In his spare time, he studied painting at the Académie Julian and developed an admiration for Jules Chéret; an innovator in poster design.

In the 1890s, he opened his own workshop and began designing posters, initially under contract to Verneau, then with Pierre Vercasson. He gradually developed his own style, moving away from the opulent women favored by Chéret. By 1900, he worked almost exclusively with caricatures and established himself with his famous poster for the "Billards Brunswick", featuring three bald men. After 1902, he collaborated with La Lanterne, a daily journal with anti-clerical sentiments.

In the years leading up to World War I, he caricatured many prominent people, including Queen Victoria and Paul Kruger, for "Dr. Trabant's Supreme Pills" (which were ordered torn down by the Prefecture of Police), and the heads of state meeting at the Permanent Court of Arbitration, to advertise the menthe-pastille made by Giffard. Among the other companies he worked for, one may mention Maggi, Gellé frères, Bazar de l'Hôtel de Ville and Réglisse Zan.

During the war, he made very few posters; focusing instead on rubber models and patterns for advertising balloons.

== Selected works ==
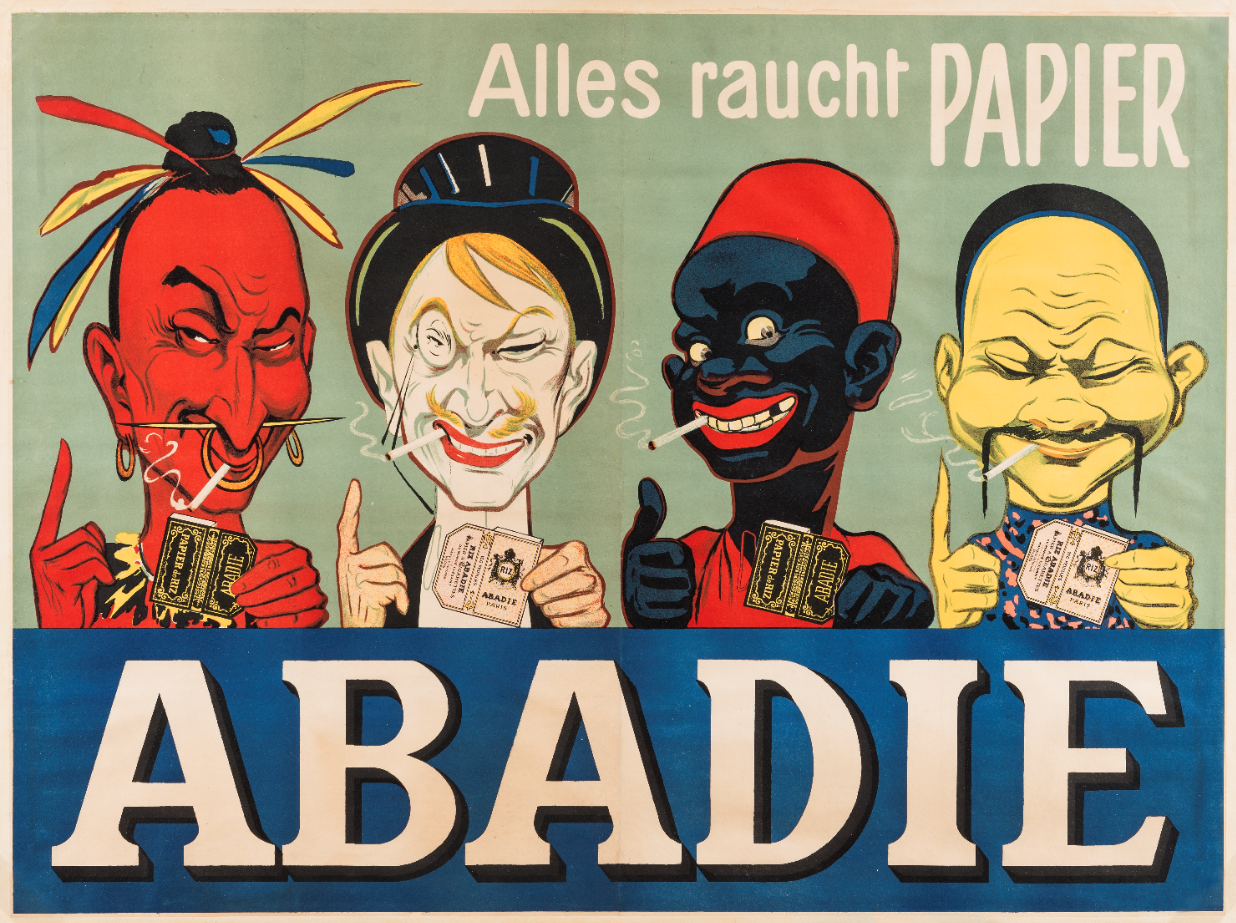
Ad for Abadie (1905)

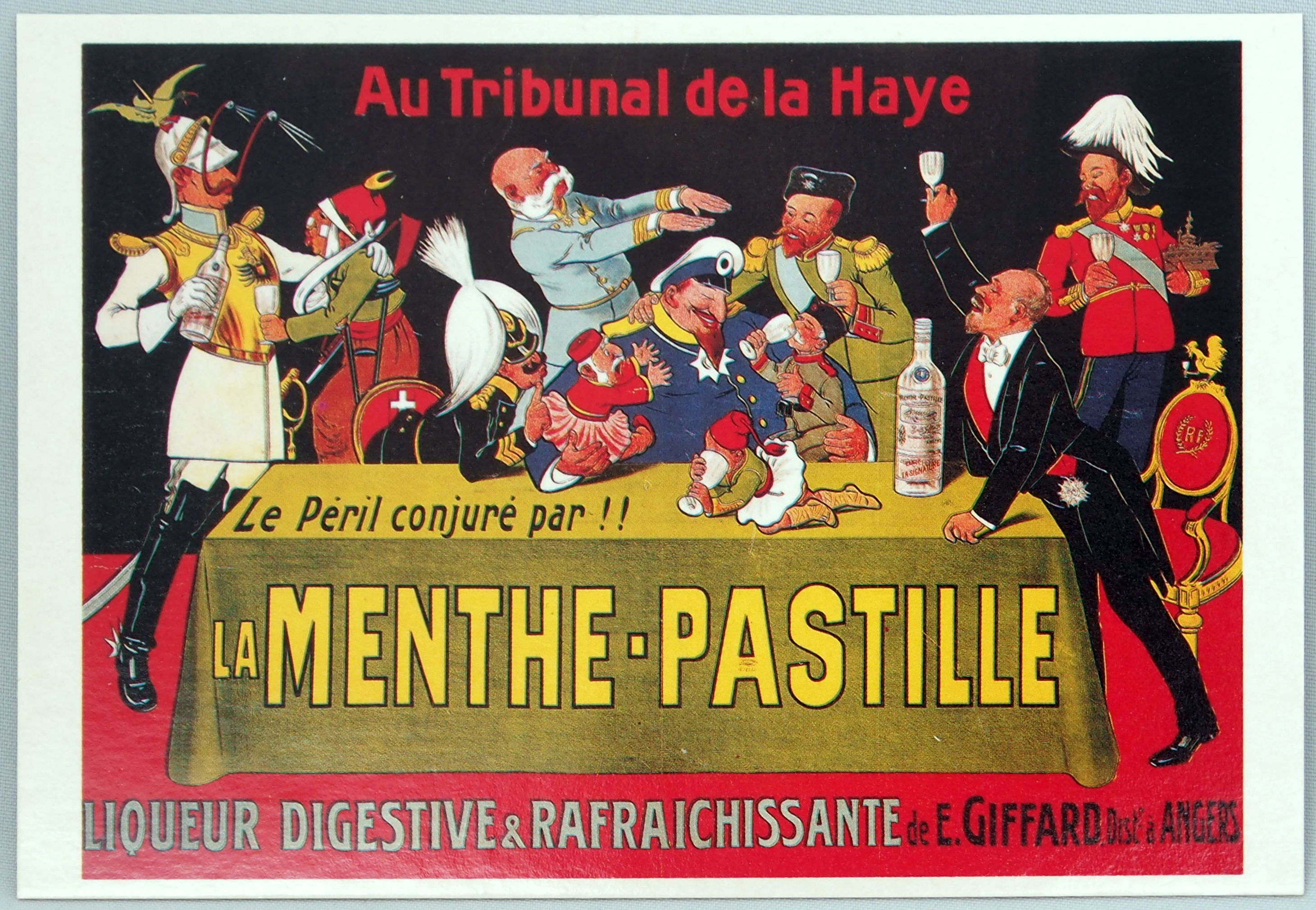
Giffard Mint Pastille

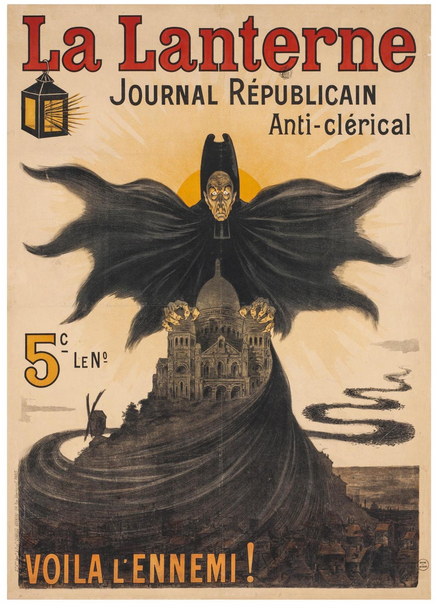
Cover art for
La Lanterne

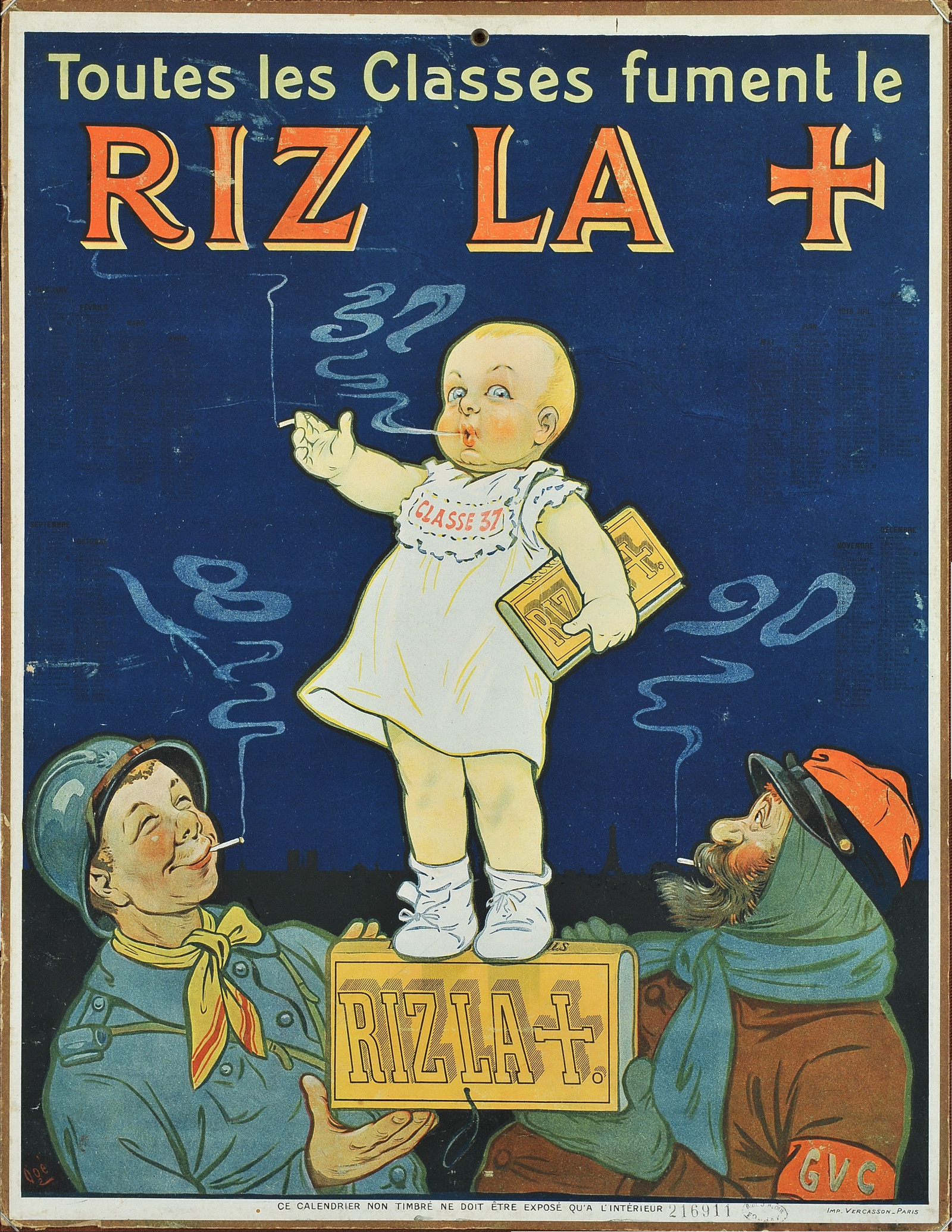
Riz la Croix
rolling papers

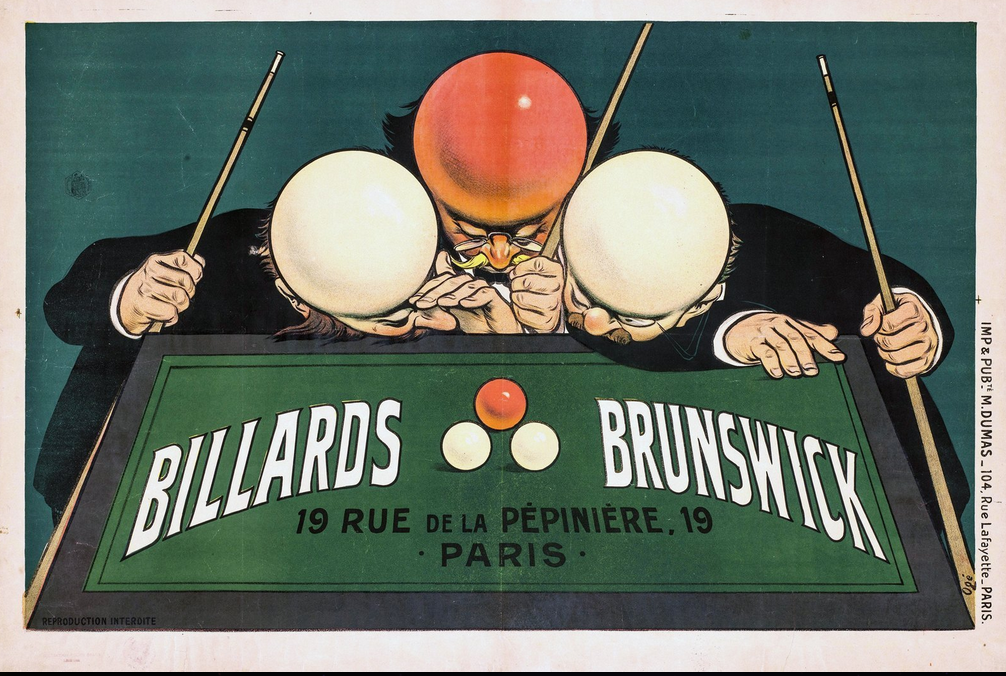
Billiards Brinswick
