= Bob Allen (surgeon) =

Journalist and surgeon

Robert (Bob) Allen
- Born: 1772; London, England
- Died: 1805 (aged 32–33); London, England
- Occupation(s): Surgeon, journalist

Robert Allen (1772–1805) was a British journalist and surgeon, famous for having introduced Robert Southey and Samuel Taylor Coleridge.

A contemporary of Leigh Hunt, Charles Lamb, and Samuel Taylor Coleridge, Bob Allen attended Christ's Hospital and left the school as a Senior Grecian. He attended University College, Oxford, where, in his rooms, the historic meeting between Robert Southey and Coleridge took place. He was also an associate of Hazlitt and William Godwin, and a number of scholars have speculated that he was responsible for the acquaintance of Lamb and William Godwin. Coleridge lamented in a letter that Godwin was having a negative influence on Allen and had cause him to become a religious sceptic.

Allen married a widow much older than himself who had children as old as he was. Lamb is known to have strongly objected to the marriage. Sadly for Allen his wife died shortly after they were married. In 1797 Allen was appointed Deputy Surgeon of the Second Royal Dragoons in Portugal. And in 1802 he spent time in the Lake District with John Stoddart, the brother-in-law of William Hazlitt. Allen practiced as a journalist for a number of years, writing for the periodicals The Oracle, The True Briton, The Star, and The Traveller. But journalism offered Allen little success.

Lamb wrote several short reminiscences of Allen included in his essay "Newspapers", and "Christ's Hospital Five and Thirty Years Ago". Leigh Hunt's Autobiography also contains a panegyric to Allen. Hunt wrote: "Nor shalt thou, their composer, be quickly forgotten, Allen, with the cordial smile, and still more cordial laugh, with which thou wert wont to make the old cloister shake, in thy cognition of some poignant jest of theirs; or the anticipation of some more material, and, peradventure, practical one, of thine own."
