= Arthur Charlett =

17th/18th-century English academic and administrator

Arthur Charlett (1655 – 4 November 1722) was an Oxford academic and administrator. He was Master of University College, Oxford for thirty years until his death in 1722. He was noted for his love of society, and for his expensive way of living.

== Life ==
He was son of Arthur Charlett, Rector of Collingbourn Ducis, Wiltshire, by Judith, daughter of Mr Cratford, a merchant of London, and was born at Shipton, near Cheltenham, on 4 January 1655. After receiving his early education at the free school at Salisbury, he matriculated at Trinity College, Oxford, on 13 January 1669, at the age of 14. He obtained a scholarship there and proceeded to achieve a B.A. degree on 17 April 1673, and an M.A. on 23 November 1676. He was chosen to be a Fellow at the election of 1680 and in the same year received deacon's orders from John Fell, Bishop of Oxford. In 1683, he was chosen to be a junior proctor in the University of Oxford. He was appointed tutor to Francis North, 2nd Baron Guilford in 1688.

On 17 December 1684, Charlett took the degree of B.D., and when in 1692 the Mastership of University College was refused by internal candidates, he was chosen as Master on 7 July, with the backing of John Hudson, and the next day proceeded to D.D. Charlett saw that the Clarendon Press annually printed some classical work, and then himself presented a copy of it to each of the students of his college. He was an interfering academic politician, satirised in No. 43 of The Spectator where Charlett, under the name of Abraham Froth is made to write a letter describing the business transacted at the meetings of the hebdomadal council. He promoted the first attempt at a university newspaper, published in 1707, with the title of Mercurius Oxoniensis, or the Oxford Intelligencer.

Through the influence of Archbishop Thomas Tenison, Charlett was appointed chaplain to the King on 17 November 1697, and held the office until he with other chaplains was removed in March 1717. In the spring of 1706 he was in some trouble, being sent for to London to give an account of a paper he had shown circulated, asserting that Gilbert Burnet was to receive a large sum of money when presbyterianism was established. On 28 June 1707, he was instituted to the rectory of Hambleden, Buckinghamshire. He damaged his reputation in the matter of the dedication of Edward Thwaites's Saxon Heptateuch to George Hickes, where Lords Somers and Oxford were both friends of Dean Hickes and resented Charlett's interference. In 1714, he used his influence with the Vice-chancellor of the university to have Thomas Hearne prosecuted for his preface to William Camden's Elizabeth, and so put a stop to its printing.

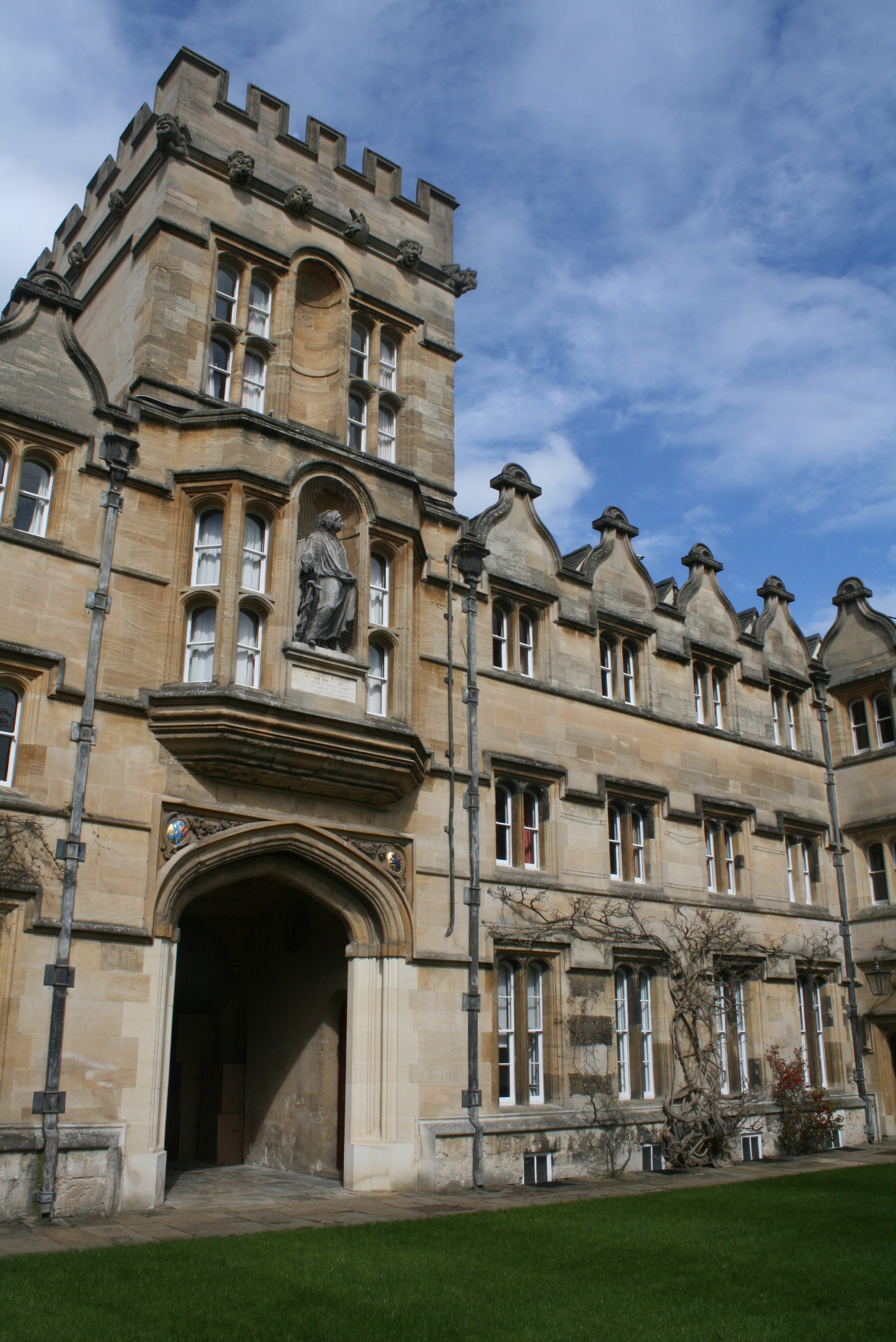
The tower in the Radcliffe Quadrangle at University College, built during the Mastership of Arthur Charlett

During Charlett's Mastership, the Radcliffe Quad was built at University College in 1716–1719. He died at his lodgings in the college, on 18 November 1722 and is buried in the college chapel. The position of Master was contested by two men, Thomas Cockman and William Dennison. The stand-off was not resolved until 1729, after an appeal to the Crown.

== Works ==
Charlett published A Discourse of the Holy Eucharist, 1686, in answer to Abraham Woodhead's Two Discourses concerning ... the Eucharist, published by Obadiah Walker in 1686. He spent the long vacation 1683 in taking a tour in Scotland, where he was hospitably entertained by Sir George Mackenzie of Rosehaugh, in the county of Ross, and by other men of learning; he wrote most of the life of Sir George Mackenzie in Anthony à Wood's Fasti (ii. 414). Charlett contributed a paper on a fatal colliery fire near Newcastle to the Philosophical Transactions of the Royal Society in 1708.

Academic offices
Preceded by Thomas Bennet	Master of University College, Oxford; 1692–1722	Succeeded by William Dennison / Thomas Cockman
