= Evelyn Monier-Williams =

English judge

Evelyn Monier-Williams

Evelyn Faithfull Monier-Williams (/ˈmɒniər/; né Williams; 29 April 1920 – 30 June 2015) was an English barrister and circuit judge.

== Life and career ==
Evelyn Faithfull Monier-Williams (known as "Bill") was an English barrister and judge, born 29 April 1920 in Kensington to Roy Thornton Monier-Williams and Gladys Speer. He had two sisters. His great-grandfather was Sir Monier Monier-Williams and he was connected by Sir Monier’s daughter to the clerical Bickersteth family, being most close to John Bickersteth, Bishop of Bath and Wells.

Monier-Williams married Maria-Angela Oswald, a German opera singer in 1948. They had one son and one daughter.

Monier-Williams was educated at Charterhouse and University College, Oxford to read History. The Second World War interrupted his studies so he was awarded a war degree. He was called up to the war in 1940 and served as a field gunner in the 8th Army and the 50th Northumbrian Infantry Division.

After the war, as a competent German speaker, he was stationed in Mönchengladbach tasked with troop welfare and entertainment. Once de-mobilised, Monier-Williams decided to follow in his father’s footsteps and train as a barrister. He was called by Inner Temple in 1948. His chambers were in Francis Taylor Buildings and he built up a practice on divorce and personal injury work. In 1972 he was appointed a circuit judge.

Monier-Williams became a Bencher at Inner Temple in 1967 and Treasurer in 1988. He was very active in Inn matters serving on many committees including the Library Committee and Temple Church Committee. He was also Vice Chair of the Council of Legal Education and a member of the Council of the Selden Society. In 1988, Monier-Williams was instrumental in getting Mahatma Gandhi posthumously reinstated to Inner Temple after he had been expelled in 1922.

Monier-Williams was survived by his son, Christopher, and daughter, Vivien Piercy.
