= George Edward Gouraud =

US Army Medal of Honor recipient and recording engineer (1842–1912)

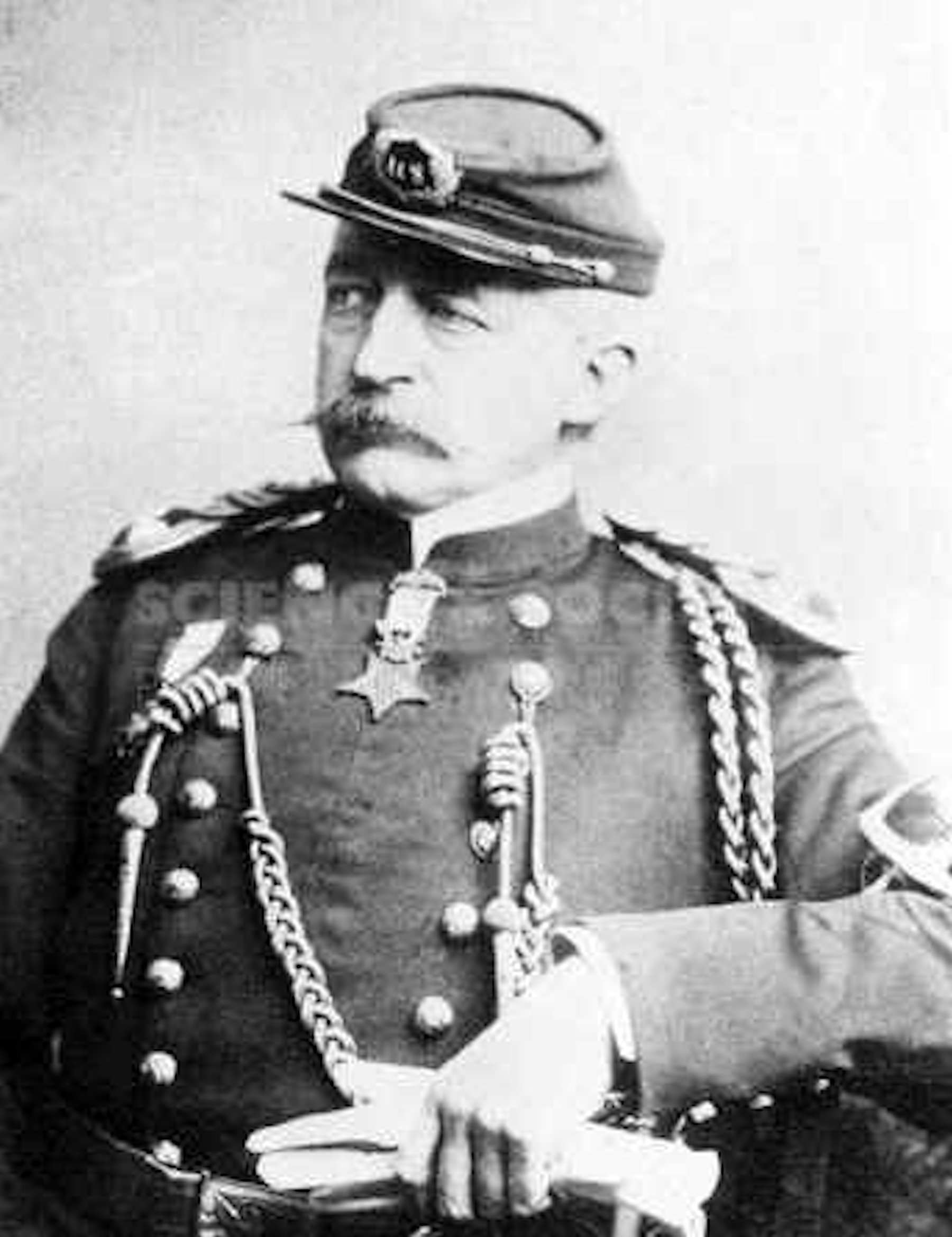
- Born: June 30, 1842; Niagara Falls, New York, US
- Died: February 17, 1912 (aged 69); La Tour-de-Peilz, Vevey, Switzerland
- Military career
- Allegiance: United States; Union
- Branch: United States Army; Union Army
- Service years: 1861–1865
- Rank: Captain; Brevet Lieutenant Colonel
- Unit: 3rd New York Cavalry Regiment
- Conflicts: American Civil War: Battle of Honey Hill
- Awards: Medal of Honor

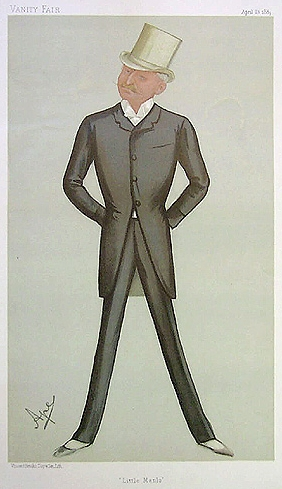
Gouraud as caricatured by Ape (Carlo Pellegrini) in Vanity Fair, April 1889

George Edward Gouraud (30 June 1842 – 17 February 1912) was an American Civil War recipient of the Medal of Honor who later became famous for introducing the new Edison Phonograph cylinder audio recording technology to England in 1888.

== Civil war ==
He was the son of the French engineer François Fauvel Gouraud (1808–1847) who came to the US in 1839 to introduce the daguerreotype technology for photography. Both parents died in the summer of 1847. Gouraud served in the Union Army during the American Civil War, enlisting in the 3rd New York Cavalry Regiment. Originally a Sergeant, within a month he became the regiment's Sergeant Major and then was commissioned as Lieutenant and adjutant. He became a Captain a year later. In June 1863 he left the unit and became an aide-de-camp on the command staff of the Department of the South. He was later brevetted Lieutenant Colonel. After the war, he became a companion of the New York Commandery of the Military Order of the Loyal Legion of the United States. Many years later, in 1893, he received the Medal of Honor for his services at the Battle of Honey Hill.

== Working for Edison ==
He moved to London at the behest of American Railway magnate William Jackson Palmer to promote the Edison telegraph system. Gouraud did not meet Edison himself until 1874 when the latter was sent to demonstrate new equipment that he had invented to the British Post Office. As an enthusiast of new electric inventions, in the late 1880s and early 1890s he had many gadgets installed in his house at Beulah Hill, Upper Norwood in South London, which he renamed "Little Menlo" after Menlo Park, New Jersey where Edison's research facility was situated.

== The Edison phonograph ==
In 1888, Thomas Edison sent his "Perfected" Phonograph to Gouraud in London and on 14 August 1888, Gouraud introduced the phonograph to London in a press conference, including the playing of a piano and cornet recording of Arthur Sullivan's "The Lost Chord", one of the first recordings of music ever made.

The recording of Sullivan's "The Lost Chord" from 1888

A series of parties followed, introducing the phonograph to members of society at "Little Menlo". Sullivan was invited to one of these on 5 October 1888. After dinner, he recorded a speech to be sent to Thomas Edison, saying, in part:

I can only say that I am astonished and somewhat terrified at the result of this evening's experiments: astonished at the wonderful power you have developed, and terrified at the thought that so much hideous and bad music may be put on record forever. But all the same I think it is the most wonderful thing that I have ever experienced, and I congratulate you with all my heart on this wonderful discovery.

The voice of George Gouraud, introducing Arthur Sullivan in 1888.

Gouraud assembled a small team of recordists who travelled the country promoting the phonograph and were also involved in taking the voices of many great Victorians. In 1890 he conceived the making of three cylinder records of personalities related to the Crimean War to be played for charity in aid of distressed old soldiers from that campaign. On May 15, 1890, Charles Stytler travelled to Freshwater the Isle of Wight to record Lord Tennyson (1809–1892) reading The Charge of the Light Brigade.

- July 30, 1890, Florence Nightingale (1820–1910) addressing her "dear old comrades of Balaclava" from 10 South Street, Park Lane, London, her home. The recordist was C.R. Johnson
- August 2, 1890, Martin Lanfried (1834–1902) playing a bugle in the Edison House, London, bugle used at the Battle of Waterloo in 1815.

== Later years ==
In 1898 Gouraud met Horace Short, youngest of the three Short Brothers of later aviation fame and for two years financed his researches into compressed-air amplification in Hove, Sussex, England. The invention was an improvement on Edison's Aerophone of 1878) and was named the Gouraudphone. It was demonstrated at the Exposition Universelle (1900) in Paris. In 1900 Horace introduced his brothers Eustace and Oswald to Gouraud who also financed them and gave them workshop space at Hove to develop their balloons intended for military observation. By 1904 Gouraud was the "Governor General" of French sugar millionaire Jacques Lebaudy's fictional "Empire of the Sahara" and speaking of offering his son's regiment, the 17th Lancers, as Lebaudy's Guard of Honour. In 1909 he went bankrupt.

== Family ==
He was the son of the French engineer Francis Fauvel Gouraud (1808–1847) who came to the US in 1839 to introduce the daguerreotype technology for photography. Both parents died in the summer of 1847 and George and his older sister Clemence (b. 1838) were thus orphaned. George was married in New York in 1870 to Florence Willis Snow (1845–1907) and the family moved to London. His first wife died in Brighton in 1907. In 1909 he was married again, in Paris to the Norwegian composer Helga Smith-Hald (born 1877), niece to the painter Hans Dahl. They resided in France and Switzerland.

George Gouraud died on 17 February 1912 at the Hôtel-Pension des Alpes, La Tour-de-Peilz in the district of Vevey, Switzerland, only a week after his son Bayard Gouraud had died from a heart failure while returning home to England from India where he served in the 17th Lancers, a cavalry regiment of the British Army. Another son was ragtime songwriter Jackson Gouraud (1874–1910) who in 1901 became the third husband to heiress and orientalist Aimée Crocker (1864–1941). A third son was composer and broadcasting pioneer Powers Gouraud (1881–1954), who married Gladys Crocker (Aimée Crocker's daughter from her first marriage to Richard Porter Ashe). The daughter Theodora Florence Gouraud (1876–1943) was married at St Paul's, Knightsbridge in London, 1899 to Reginald Courtenay Gayer (1871–1940). His eldest son was George Fauvel Gouraud (1872–1915), a lawyer who also wrote poetry.

== Medal of Honor citation ==
Rank and Organization:

Captain and aide-de-camp, U.S. Volunteers. Place and Date: At Honey Hill, S.C., 30 November 1864. Birth: New York, N.Y. Date of Issue: 21 August 1893.

Citation:

While under severe fire of the enemy, which drove back the command, rendered valuable assistance in rallying the men.

== See also ==
- List of Medal of Honor recipients
