= Ralph Williams (cricketer) =

English cricketer and barrister

Personal information
- Full name: Ralph Augustin Williams
- Born: 2 February 1879; Caversham, Berkshire, England
- Died: 1 December 1958 (aged 79); Earley, Berkshire, England
- Batting: Right-handed
- Bowling: Right-arm medium

Domestic team information
- Years: Team
- 1899–1902: Oxford University
- 1897–1904: Berkshire
- 1896: Oxfordshire
- 1895: Buckinghamshire

Career statistics
Competition	First-class
Matches	15
Runs scored	584
Batting average	24.33
100s/50s	1/4
Top score	105
Balls bowled	1,895
Wickets	40
Bowling average	27.47
5 wickets in innings	3
10 wickets in match	–
Best bowling	5/30
Catches/stumpings	14/–
- Source: Cricinfo, 13 August 2011

Ralph Augustin Williams (2 February 1879 – 1 December 1958) was an English cricketer and barrister. Williams was a right-handed batsman who bowled right-arm medium pace. He was born in Caversham, Berkshire.

== Life ==
Educated at Winchester College, Williams made a single Minor Counties Championship appearance for Buckinghamshire against Oxfordshire in 1895. He played for Oxfordshire in the 1896 season, making 3 appearances in the Minor Counties Championship. The season after that, he joined Berkshire, who he made his debut for against Wiltshire in the Minor Counties Championship. Following his education at Winchester College, Williams undertook studies at University College, Oxford. It was in 1899 that he made his first-class debut for Oxford University against Worcestershire. He made 11 further first-class appearances for the university, the last of which came against Cambridge University in 1902. In his 12 first-class matches for the university, he scored 443 runs at an average of 23.31, with a high score of 65. This score, one of four fifties he scored for the university, came against Ireland in 1902. With the ball, he took 22 wickets at a bowling average of 34.90, with best figures of 5/30. These figures, which were his only five wicket haul for the university, came against Surrey in 1902.

In late 1902, he toured India with an Oxford University Authentics team, playing 3 first-class matches on the tour, one each against Bombay, the Parsees and the Gentlemen of India. The tour was a successful one for Williams, with him scoring 141 runs at an average of 28.20, with the tour including his only first-class century, a score of 105 which came against Bombay. He was equally as successful with the ball, taking 18 wickets at an average of 18.38, which included two five wicket hauls. Williams continued to play Minor counties cricket for Berkshire until 1904, when he made his final appearance for the county against Glamorgan in that season's Minor Counties Championship.

A barrister by profession, Williams was appointed to the Inner Temple in 1903.
