= Thomas Cockman =

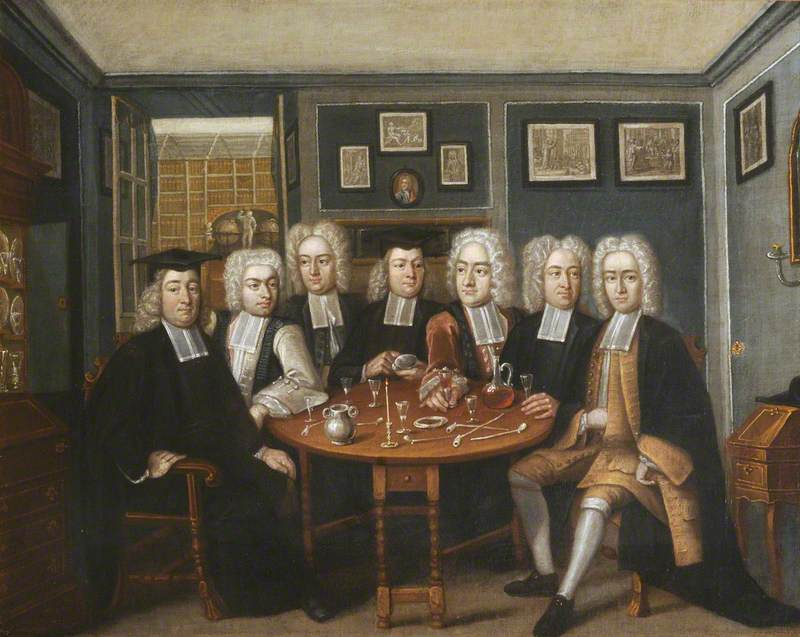
Portrait of Thomas and John Cockman and some Fellows of University College by Benjamin Ferrers. Commissioned by his brother John (far left) after his 1727 confirmation of mastership, this painting depicts Thomas Cockman (centre) and his supporters celebrating their victory against Dennison.

Revd Dr Thomas Cockman, Doctor of Divinity (1675–1745) was an Oxford academic and administrator. He was Master of University College, Oxford.

Cockman was an undergraduate at University College, Oxford, matriculated in 1692, then a Fellow of the college during 1701–13, before becoming Master of the college later. He was Rector at Chidingstone in Kent, in 1705.

In 1699 his translation of Cicero's De officiis was published.

Cockman's mastership at University College was a contested one, with William Dennison, who also served as Master between 1722 and 1729. There were two disputed elections held in 1722. Cockman appealed to the Crown and was declared Master of University College in 1729. The success of Thomas Cockman's appeal involved accepting that King Alfred had founded the college. This myth originated from the late 1380s but it was widely believed by Cockman's time. The ruling at the court hearing meant that the Visitor of University College, who is responsible for resolving such disputes, should be the Crown rather than the university. This event acted as the impetus for the college antiquary, William Smith, to write a history of the college, refuting this medieval myth. This materialised as The Annals of University College (1728), the first scholarly Oxford history. Cockman received this book coldly, dismissing it as "the private opinion of a partial disgusted old man, who was always famous for opposition and confounding thing".

In 2008, University College acquired a painting including Thomas Cockman. The painting had remained in Thomas Cockman's family, but was auctioned at Sotheby's. The picture is presumed to be a celebration of the success of Cockman's appeal to the Crown to be declared Master of University College in 1729. The painting was probably commissioned by his brother, John Cockman, who is also in the picture along with a number of Fellows of University College. It was painted by Benjamin Ferrers.

Academic offices
Preceded by Arthur Charlett / William Dennison	Master of University College, Oxford; 1722/1729–1745	Succeeded by John Browne
