= William of Durham =

Founder of University College, Oxford (d. 1249)

Coat of arms of University College, Oxford, whose foundation arose from William of Durham's bequest. (Note: These are the arms of University College, Oxford, rather than William’s personal arms. They were adopted as the attributed arms of Alfred the Great, whom the College formerly and falsely regarded as its founder.)

William of Durham (died 1249) is said to have founded University College, Oxford, England. He most likely came from Sedgefield, County Durham and was educated at Wearmouth monastery and in Paris, France.

William of Durham was archdeacon of Caux and (in 1235, for a few months) archbishop-elect of Rouen in Normandy, France.

When, in 1229, riots broke out in Paris, he may have been the leader of a group of students who migrated from that city to Oxford, but this tradition is not attested to by contemporary sources. What is more certain is that he held several rich benefices in England and died in Rouen, in 1249.

He left 310 marks, a large amount of money, in his will to be invested in rents that would support scholars in Oxford. This benefaction resulted in one of the first of the Oxford halls or colleges. Subsequently, this foundation took the name of University College.

== Legacy ==
University College, Oxford now has a William of Durham Club for old members leaving a legacy to the College.
