= François Fauvel Gouraud =

French engineer and photographer

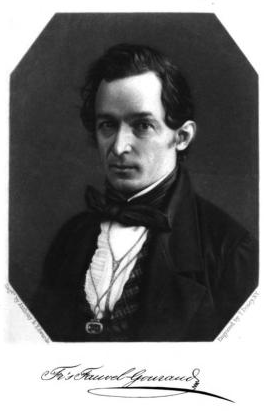
Gouraud in his 1845 book.

François Fauvel Gouraud (1808 – 16 June 1847) was a French expert in photography and mnemonics.

He was most known as an expert on daguerreotypes, which in January 1839 had become the first publicly announced photographic process, invented in France by Louis Daguerre (1787–1851). Gouraud was an agent for the sole producer, Alphonse Giroux & Cie, when he late 1839 sailed to America in order to introduce the invention and give lectures. He also brought the equipment and became the person introducing it to America.

In 1840 he spent time in Boston and sold the first camera to Samuel Bemis (1793–1881), one of the earliest photographers in USA. That camera was exhibited in George Eastman House as the first photographic camera in USA. Gouraud also published an article entitled A Description of the Daguerreotype Process, or a Summary of M. Gouraud's Public Lectures, according to the principles of M. Daguerre; with a description of a provisory method for taking Human Portraits. He toured the northeast of USA, being in Buffalo in 1842, selling even to Samuel Morse (1791–1872) who had taken an interest since meeting Daguerre in Paris in 1839.

Later in the 1840s he was a contributor to the development of the Mnemonic major system as it is known today, a way of remembering numbers. Gouraud was originally from Martinique. He died in Brooklyn only 39 years old in 1847. His wife had died a month before, and the two children were now orphans. His son colonel George Edward Gouraud (1842–1912) became a Medal of Honor recipient, and had a similar civil career, as he became Thomas Edison's agent in London and in 1888 brought the new Edison Phonograph cylinder audio recording technology to England. His daughter Clemence Emma Gouraud (1838–1913) was married in 1857 to the reverend and poet Horatio Nelson Powers (1826–1890).

At the time of his death, he lived at 202 Columbia Street, Carroll Gardens, Brooklyn.

== Publications ==
- Francis Fauvel-Gouraud, Phreno-mnemotechnic Dictionary, Houel and Macoy, 1844
- Francis Fauvel-Gouraud, Phreno-Mnemotechny or The Art of Memory, 1845
- Francis Fauvel-Gouraud, Practical Cosmophonography, 1850
