= William Dennison (academic) =

William Dennison was an Oxford academic and administrator. He was a contested Master of University College, Oxford.

== Contested Mastership of University College ==
On the death of the previous Master of University College, Arthur Charlett, on 4 November 1722, the position of Master was contested by two men, Thomas Cockman and William Dennison. Dennison was previously a Percy Fellow at University College. In the first election on 4 December 1722, Thomas Cockman was elected by a narrow margin. A formal complaint was made to the Vice-Chancellor of Oxford University that the election was contrary to the statutes. Another election was organised, at which Dennison presided. Dennison was elected on 17 December 1722. However, Cockman's name had already been formally recorded as Master of the College. Both men complained to the Vice-Chancellor and a decision was made in favour of Dennison. The situation escalated with an appeal to the Crown. The issue was not finalised until 1729 when it was resolved in favour of Thomas Cockman rather than Dennison. This was the only time in University College's history when it had two Masters.

Academic offices
| Preceded by Arthur Charlett | Master of University College, Oxford; 1722–1729 | Succeeded by Thomas Cockman |
