= Benjamin Ferrers =

English portrait painter

Benjamin Ferrers (c. 1667–1732) was an English portrait painter.

== Life ==
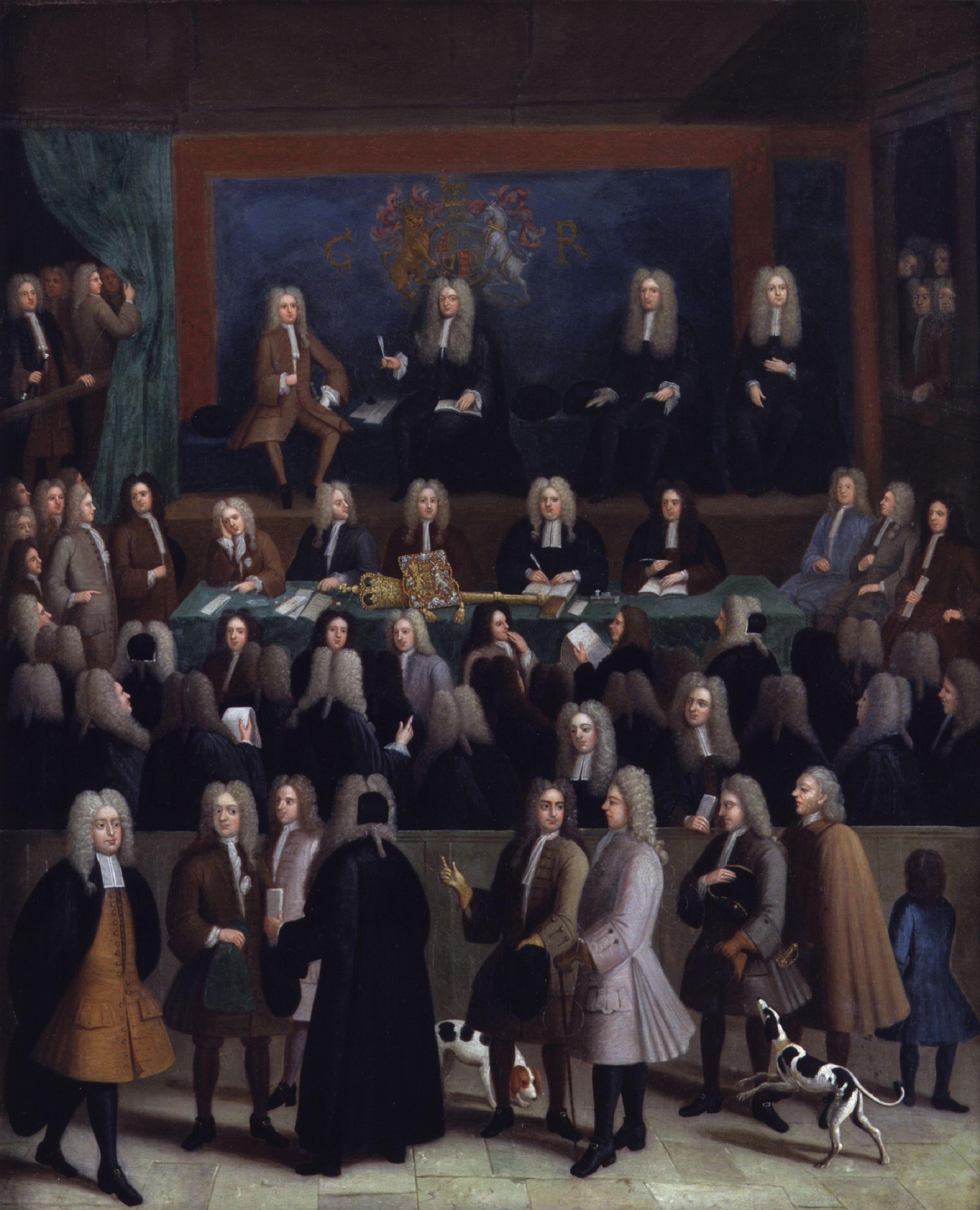
The Court of Chancery during the reign of George I by Benjamin Ferrers (National Portrait Gallery, London).

Christened in late 1667 in Cookham, Berkshire, Ferrers was deaf from his birth and appears to have lived in Westminster. An account record of a court case in 1720 records:

A Motion that Mr. Benjamin Ferrers, A Deaf and Dumb Person, might be allowed to acknowledge a Fine in open Court, upon an Examinination to be taken by Signs upon the Fingers, upon the Report on Oath of one Mr. Ralph Russell, who swore he had been used to converse with him in that Manner for seventeen Years and upwards, and that he understood his Meaning perfectly by these Signs...

It appeared likewise that he could write his own Name very well and some other Things, yet could read very little Writing, tho' he distinguished several Counties on a Map shewed him in Court, and likewise on the Oath of Mr. George Turner, who swore he had been acquainted with Ferrers ten Years, and that he had painted Mr. Burchet's (the Secretary of the Admiralty) Picture, for which he would not take under five Guineas, and that he believed he understood the Value of Things very well, especially Paintings...

He was related to William Beveridge, bishop of St. Asaph. Beveridge refused to sit for a portrait during his lifetime, but following his death at Westminster on 5 March 1706–7, Ferrers painted one from his corpse. The picture, which is in the Bodleian Library at Oxford, was engraved by William Sherwin (both in mezzotint and line), by Michael van der Gucht as a frontispiece to Beveridge's works, and by Trotter.

Ferrers also painted a picture of the Court of Chancery under Lord Chancellor Macclesfield, which included portraits of Macclesfield, Sir Philip Yorke and Sir Thomas Pengelly. This picture was owned by Dr. Lort of Cambridge, who gave it to the Earl of Hardwicke, and at the 5th Earl of Hardwicke's 1888 sale of pictures at Wimpole Hall it was bought by the National Portrait Gallery. His painting Three Ladies of the Leman Family and their Dogs on a Terrace (1728) is in the collection of the Tate Gallery

Ferrers painted a portrait of Thomas Cockman, Master of University College, Oxford, his brother John Cockman, and five Fellows of the college. The painting remained in the Cockham family until 2008, when it was auctioned at Sotheby's and acquired by University College.

Ferrers died in 1732; a Latin panegyric on him was written by his friend, Vincent Bourne, of Westminster School.

== Sources ==
This article incorporates text from a publication now in the public domain: "Ferrers, Benjamin". Dictionary of National Biography. London: Smith, Elder & Co. 1885–1900.
