= Robin Darwall-Smith =

British archivist

Robin Darwall-Smith FRHistS FSA
- Born: Robin Haydon Darwall-Smith; 1963
- Occupation: Archivist
- Employer(s): Oxfordshire Archives; Jesus College, Oxford; Magdalen College, Oxford; University College, Oxford
- Board member of: Oxford Historical Society (trustee since 2014)

Academic background
- Education: University College, Oxford; University of Liverpool
- Influences: George Cawkwell

Academic work
- Discipline: Classics; Archives
- Sub-discipline: Academic archives
- Institutions: Jesus College, Oxford, Magdalen College, Oxford, University College, Oxford
- Main interests: College archives
- Notable works: A History of University College, Oxford (OUP, 2008)
- Website: univ.ox.ac.uk

Robin Haydon Darwall-Smith FRHistS FSA (born 1963) is a British archivist, based in Oxford and associated with several Oxford University College archives.

== Education ==
Robin Darwall-Smith studied classics at University College, Oxford under George Cawkwell and Chris Pelling as an undergraduate and postgraduate. He then trained as an archivist at the University of Liverpool. While at Oxford, Darwall-Smith represented University College on the television quiz show University Challenge in 1987, reaching the series final.

== Career ==
Darwall-Smith initially worked at the Oxfordshire Archives. Subsequently, he has been an archivist for Jesus College, Magdalen College, and University College at Oxford.

Robin Darwall-Smith was elected a Fellow of the Society of Antiquaries of London in 2009 and of the Royal Historical Society in 2010. He appeared on the television documentary series Ian Hislop's Olden Days in 2014.

Some of his papers are held by the Archive at University College, Oxford.

== Selected books ==
Robin Darwall-Smith has written a number of books, including:

- The Jowett papers: A summary catalogue of the papers of Benjamin Jowett (1817–1893) at Balliol College, Oxford. Balliol College Library, 1993. ISBN 978-0951256930
- Emperors and Architecture: A Study of Flavian Rome, Peeters. 1996. ISBN 978-2870311714
- Account Rolls of University College, Oxford, Vol I (1381–1471), John Wiley & Sons, 1999. ISBN 978-0904107173
- Account Rolls of University College, Oxford, Vol II (1472–1597), Oxford Historical Society, 2001. ISBN 978-0904107197
- The Architectural Drawings of Magdalen College: A Catalogue, Oxford University Press, 2002. ISBN 978-0199248667 (with Roger White)
- A History of University College, Oxford, Oxford University Press, 2008. ISBN 978-0199284290
- Early Records of University College, Oxford Historical Society, 2015. ISBN 978-0904107272
- History of Universities, volume XXXV/1, Oxford University Press, 2022. ISBN 978-0192867445 (edited with Peregrine Horden)
- Music in Twentieth-Century Oxford: New Directions, Boydell Press, 2023. ISBN 978-1783277247 (edited with Susan Wollenberg)

== See also ==
- List of archivists
- The Annals of University College
