= William Carr (biographer) =

William Carr (14 June 1862 – 28 January 1925) was a British biographer, historian, magistrate and Deputy Lieutenant for Norfolk, England.

== Life ==
William Carr was born in Gomersal House, Yorkshire, to William Carr, magistrate and local squire. He was educated, first at Marlborough College, and then in 1882 went to University College, Oxford. His strength was in history where he won the three historical essay prizes: Stanhope (1884); Lothian (1888); and Arnold (1890).

In 1886, Carr married Margaret, eldest daughter of James Franck Bright, Master of University College. He studied for the Bar, and having read with Lord Robson he joined the North-Eastern Circuit. He was a strong Conservative, and contested the Morley Division of Yorkshire in 1892 and 1895. To the Dictionary of National Biography he was a contributor, and later in life became a connoisseur especially of silver, furniture, pictures and Greek coins. During World War I he supported the Volunteer force in the rank of Major. He was a magistrate of many years standing, for Norfolk, Suffolk, and the West Riding, chairman of the Norfolk Quarter Sessions, vice-chairman of the Norfolk County Council, and a Deputy Lieutenant for Norfolk. His main interest was primarily in the land, managing his own estates, and he was a practical farmer of experience in both Yorkshire and Norfolk.

In poor health, Carr was advised to give up his county work, but the end came unexpectedly when he died at Ditchingham Hall, Norfolk on 28 January 1925. He was survived by his wife and five children: an only son William Greenwood Carr, of the 12th Lancers, and four daughters. Three daughters were married, respectively, Margaret to Geoffrey Salmond, another daughter to Colonel Newman and Alice to Major Lawrence Athill.

== Works ==
- University college (1902) a history of University College, Oxford
