= List of masters of Clare College, Cambridge =

The following have been masters of Clare College, Cambridge:

List of masters
Name	Image	Master from	Notes
Walter de Thaxted		1326	University Hall at this time
Ralph Kerdington		1342	No longer University Hall; now Clare Hall
Nicholas de Brunne		1359	
John de Donewich		1371	
John de Charteresse		1392	
William Radwinter		1400	
William Wymbyll		1421	
William Gull		1440	
William Wilflete		1446	
John Millington		1455	
Thomas Stoyll		1466	
Richard Stubbs		1470	
Gabriel Silvester		1496	
William Woodruff		1506	
Edmund Natures		1514	
John Crayford		1530	
Roland Swynbourne		1539	First term
John Madew		1549	
Roland Swynbourne		1553	Second term
Thomas Baily		1557	
Edward Leeds		1560	
Thomas Byng		1571	
William Smith		1601	
Robert Scott		1612	
Thomas Paske		1620	
Ralph Cudworth		1645	
Theophilus Dillingham		1654	1st term
Thomas Paske		1660	
Theophilus Dillingham		1661	2nd term
Samuel Blythe		1678	
William Grigg		1713	
Charles Morgan		1726	
John Wilcox		1736	
Peter Godard		1762	
John Torkington		1781	
William Webb		1815	
Edward Atkinson		1856	Priest, Vice-Chancellor of the University of Cambridge 1862–1863, 1868–1870, and 1876–1878
William Mollison		1915	Scottish mathematician
Godfrey Wilson		1929	Australian-born politician, Member of Parliament for Cambridge University, Vice-Chancellor of Cambridge University, 1935–1937
Sir Henry Thirkill		1939	Vice-Chancellor of the university from 1945 to 1947
Eric Ashby, Baron Ashby		1958	British botanist, president and vice-chancellor of Queen's University, Belfast, vice-chancellor of the University of Cambridge (1967-1969)
Robin Matthews		1975	Economist
Sir Bob Hepple		1993	South African-born legal academic
Tony Badger		2003	Paul Mellon Professor of American History (1992–2014)
Anthony Grabiner, Baron Grabiner		2014	British barrister, peer in the House of Lords, President of the University of Law since 2015
Loretta Minghella		2021	Former CEO of Christian Aid and served as the First Church Estates Commissioner
