= Salveyn =

Salveyn is a surname. Notable people with the surname include:

- Anthony Salveyn, Master of University College, Oxford (1557–58), probably the brother of Richard
- Richard Salveyn, Master of University College, Oxford (1547–51)

== See also ==
- Salvin
