= George Neville (bishop) =

Archbishop of York and Chancellor of England (c.1432–1476)

- Archbishop of York
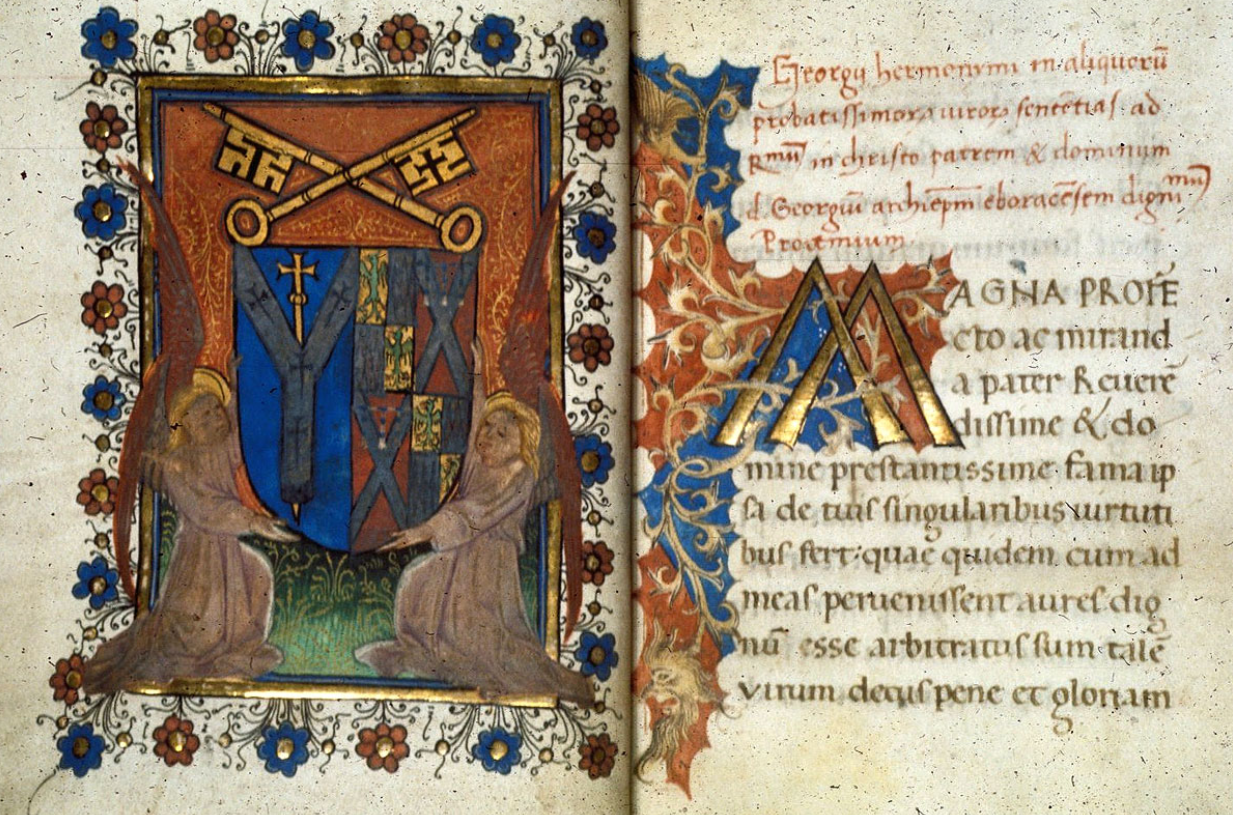
- Arms of George Neville, Archbishop of York (British Library, MS Harl.3346 ff.4v-5), c.1475.
- Appointed: 15 March 1465
- Installed: September 1465
- Term ended: 8 June 1476
- Predecessor: William Booth
- Successor: Lawrence Booth
- Other posts: Bishop of Exeter; Archdeacon of Durham

Orders
- Consecration: 3 December 1458

Personal details
- Born: George Neville c. 1432
- Died: 8 June 1476
- Denomination: Roman Catholic

Arms of Neville, with label of three points compony of Beaufort, borne as a difference by the descendants of the second marriage of Ralph Neville, 1st Earl of Westmorland (d.1425) to Joan Beaufort, a legitimised daughter of John of Gaunt (the Archbishop's grandparents)

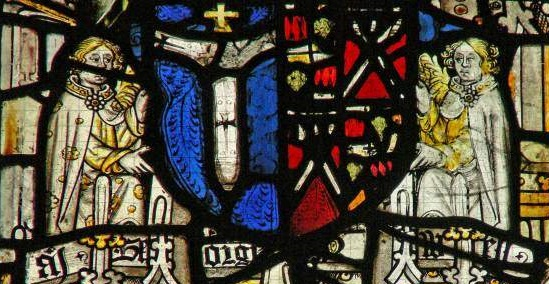
Stained glass window, Holy Trinity Church, Goodramgate, York, showing the personal arms of George Neville, Archbishop of York, with his family arms impaled with the ancient arms of the See of York

George Neville (c. 1432 – 8 June 1476) was Archbishop of York from 1465 until 1476 and Chancellor of England from 1460 until 1467 and again from 1470 until 1471.

== Life ==
Neville was the youngest son of Richard Neville, 5th Earl of Salisbury, and Alice Montagu, 5th Countess of Salisbury. He was the brother of Richard Neville, 16th Earl of Warwick, known as the "Kingmaker". He was educated at Balliol College, Oxford, and was from his childhood destined for the clerical profession, in which through the great influence of his family he obtained rapid advancement, becoming Bishop of Exeter in 1458. He was provided to the see on 4 February 1458 and consecrated on 3 December 1458. From this time forward Neville took a prominent part in the troubled politics of the period. He was present with his brother Warwick at the Battle of Northampton in July 1460, immediately after which the Great Seal was committed to his keeping.

Neville took part in the proclamation of Edward IV as king, who confirmed his appointment as chancellor. In 1463 he was employed on a diplomatic mission in France; and in 1464, after taking part in negotiation with the Scots, Neville, after collation as Archdeacon of Carlisle circa 1463 became Archbishop of York on 15 March 1465. He also served for many years as the Chancellor of the University of Oxford.

Neville's enthronement as Archbishop of York took place in Cawood Castle in September 1465 and to demonstrate the riches and power of his family, twenty eight peers, fifty nine knights, ten abbots, seven bishops, numerous lawyers, clergy, esquires, and ladies, together with their attendants and servants came to the castle. Together with the archbishop's own family and servants there were about 2500 to be fed at each meal. They consumed 4000 pigeons and 4000 crays, 2000 chickens, 204 cranes, 104 peacocks, 1200 quails, 400 swans and 400 herons, 113 oxen, six wild bulls, 608 pikes and bream, 12 porpoises and seals, 1000 sheep, 304 calves, 2000 pigs, 1000 capons, 400 plovers, 2400 of a bird called 'rees' (i.e. ruffs), 4000 mallard and teals, 204 kids and 204 bitterns, 200 pheasants, 500 partridges, 400 woodcocks, 100 curlews, 1000 egrets, over 500 stags, bucks and roes, 4000 cold and 1500 hot venison pies, 4000 dishes of jelly, 4000 baked tarts, 2000 hot custards with a proportionate quantity of bread, sugared delicacies and cakes, and 300 tuns of ale and 100 tuns of wine. As well as indicating the power of the Nevilles the menu gives a valuable insight into 15th century English avifauna.

During the next few years Neville as well as his brothers fell into disfavour with Edward IV; and in June 1467 Edward took back the Great Seal in person as punishment for Neville's obstruction of the royal plans. In 1469, after a successful rising in Yorkshire secretly fomented by Warwick, the king fell into the hands of the archbishop, by whom, after a short imprisonment, he was permitted to escape.

When Warwick was in turn defeated by the king's forces at Stamford in 1470, Archbishop Neville took the oath of allegiance to Edward, but during the short Lancastrian restoration which compelled Edward to cross to Holland, Neville acted as chancellor to Henry VI; and when the tide once more turned he again trimmed his sails to the favouring breeze, making his peace with Edward, now again triumphant, by surrendering Henry into his hands. The archbishop for a short time shared Henry's captivity in the Tower.

Having been pardoned in April 1471, Neville was re-arrested on 25 April 1472 on a charge of treason and secretly conveyed to France, where he remained a prisoner at the castle of Hammes near Calais until November 1474, when he returned to England; he died the following year, on 8 June 1476.

Archbishop Neville was a respectable scholar and a considerable benefactor of the university of Oxford and especially of Balliol College. He also seems to have shown an interest in learning Greek and to have commissioned at least one Greek manuscript.

== See also ==
- The Nevill Feast

== Bibliography ==
- Cokayne, G. E. The Complete Peerage: Volume XI Rickerton to Sisonby reprint edition (Gloucester:Sutton Publishing 2000) ISBN 0-904387-82-8
- Harris, Jonathan. "Greek scribes in England: the evidence of episcopal registers" in Through the Looking Glass: Byzantium through British Eyes, ed. Robin Cormack and Elizabeth Jeffreys (Aldershot: Ashgate, 2000), pp. 121–6. ISBN 0-86078-667-6
- Fryde, E. B.; Greenway, D. E.; Porter, S.; Roy, I. (1996). Handbook of British Chronology (Third revised ed.). Cambridge: Cambridge University Press. ISBN 0-521-56350-X.
- Hibbert, Christopher (1987). The English: A Social History, 1066-1945. London: Grafton. ISBN 9780246121813. OCLC 59779825.
- Mitchell, Rosamund Joscelyne, and Mary Dorothy Rose Leys. A History of the English People. London: Longmans, Green, 1951. OCLC 491344570
- Ross, Charles. Edward IV. Berkeley: University of California Press, 1974. ISBN 0-520-02781-7
- Weiss, Roberto. Humanism in England during the Fifteenth Century. Oxford: 1957, 2nd ed. OCLC 369708

Political offices
Preceded by William Waynflete	Lord Chancellor; 1460–1467	Succeeded by Robert Stillington
Preceded by Robert Stillington	Lord Chancellor; 1470–1471	Succeeded by Robert Stillington
Catholic Church titles
Preceded by John Hales	Bishop of Exeter; 1458–1465	Succeeded by John Booth
Preceded by William Booth	Archbishop of York; 1465–1476	Succeeded by Lawrence Booth
Academic offices
Preceded by Gilbert Kymer	Chancellor of the University of Oxford; 1453–1457	Succeeded by Thomas Chaundeler
Preceded by Thomas Chaundeler	Chancellor of the University of Oxford; 1461–1472	Succeeded by Thomas Chaundeler
