= Kexby =

Kexby may refer to:

- Kexby, Lincolnshire, England
- Kexby, North Yorkshire, England

Kexby may be a person:

- William Kexby, English 14th-century college master and archdeacon
