= Francis Johnson (academic) =

Francis Johnson was an Oxford academic and administrator. He was Master of University College, Oxford.

Johnson was Master during the Commonwealth of England. On 5 May 1660, Charles II was declared King in the Restoration. On 1 August 1660, Johnson had to defend his position as Master of University College. He stated "hee was putt in Master there by Oliver Lord Protector and the Lords and Commons" [sic]. Johnson's protestations were to no avail and he was replaced by Thomas Walker, who had been Master previously before the Commonwealth. Shortly after, Thomas Radcliffe, Obadiah Walker, and Abraham Woodhead, who had been expelled from the College in 1648, were reinstated, and four of the current Fellows were expelled.

Academic offices
Preceded by Joshua Hoyle	Master of University College, Oxford; 1655–1660	Succeeded by Thomas Walker
