= Thomas Benwell =

Thomas Benwell (aka Thomas Benyngwell) was a Master of University College, Oxford, England.

Benwell was a mature commoner and Fellow at University College. He was also a tenant of a College property. He became Master in 1428, a post he held until 1441. He was said to be an eminent preacher according to Thomas Caius, a later Master of the College.

Academic offices
| Preceded by Richard Witton | Master of University College, Oxford; 1428–1441 | Succeeded by John Martyn |
