= Thomas Baily =

English Catholic clergyman

Thomas Baily (c. 1525, Yorkshire - 7 October 1591, Douai) was an English Catholic clergyman during the Elizabethan persecutions.

== Life ==
Baily was an undergraduate at Clare College, Cambridge, where he graduated Bachelor of Arts in 1546. Soon after he became a Fellow of that house and was promoted to the degree of Master of Arts in 1549. In 1554 he was appointed a Proctor and in the following year he subscribed to the Roman Catholic Articles. About November, 1557, he was appointed Master of Clare College and in 1558 received the further degree of Bachelor of Divinity. In the same year, Queen Elizabeth I ascended the throne of England, and efforts were made by the Church of England party at Cambridge to gain recruits to its ranks, but Baily refused to conform to Anglicanism. As a consequence, he was deprived of his Mastership. He next visited Louvain, where he remained until 30 January 1576, during the interval receiving the degree of Doctor of Divinity. From Louvain he went to the English College, Douai, at the invitation of William Allen (afterwards Cardinal), during whose absence he usually filled the position of president of the English College, both while it was at Douai and later while it was in Reims. He finally left Reims on 27 January 1589, returning to Douai, where he remained until his death. He was associated with Allen in the management of the college, the distribution of the labour being that Allen had charge of the great discipline, Baily of the temporal affairs, and Richard Bristow, another of Allen's collaborators, of the seminarians' studies.

Baily was entombed in the Chapel of St. Emma the great within the parish church of St. James at Douai.

Academic offices
Preceded by John Madew	Master of Clare College, Cambridge; 1557–1560	Succeeded by Edward Leeds
