= Joshua Hoyle =

Theologian and academic (died 1654)

Joshua Hoyle (died 6 December 1654) was a Professor of Divinity at Trinity College Dublin and Master of University College, Oxford during the Commonwealth of England.

== Life ==
He was born at Sowerby, Yorkshire, and educated at Magdalen Hall, Oxford and Trinity College Dublin, becoming a fellow of the latter. He received his doctor's degree, and was made professor of divinity at the college in 1621, after James Ussher resigned and the first choice John Preston and second choice Samuel Ward had turned down the position. A firm Calvinist, he clashed with Provost William Bedell. He was an assiduous teacher in Dublin, covering every book and verse of the bible and, when he had finished, starting again.

On the outbreak of the Irish Rebellion of 1641, he took refuge in London, where he was made vicar of Stepney, replacing the royalist William Stampe. His preaching was found 'too scholastical' for his London congregation. In 1643, he became a member of the Westminster Assembly, and regularly attended its meetings. He was presented to the living of Sturminster Marshall, Dorset, by the House of Commons in February 1643. He gave evidence against William Laud as to his policy when chancellor of the University of Dublin.

He was employed by the committee of parliament for the reformation of the University of Oxford. On 8 July 1648, Obadiah Walker (a future Master of University College) and others were expelled from the university for their Royalist leanings. On 10 July, the Master of University College, Thomas Walker, lost his position as well. Hoyle was then appointed Master of University College and Regius Professor of Divinity. Hoyle complained about money: a canonry of Christ Church, Oxford, which had been appropriated for the support of the professorship, was assigned to another before Hoyle's appointment, and the income of the Master of University College was small. He died on 6 December 1654, and was buried in the old chapel of his college.

== Works ==
In support of James Ussher against William Malone, he wrote A Rejoynder to Master Malone's Reply concerning Reall Presence, Dublin, 1641. A sermon preached by "J. H.", and printed in 1645 with the title Jehojades Justice against Mattan, Baal's Priest, &c., is also attributed to Hoyle.

Academic offices
Preceded by Robert Sanderson	Regius Professor of Divinity at Oxford; 1648–1654	Succeeded by John Conant
Preceded by Thomas Walker	Master of University College, Oxford; 1648–1654	Succeeded by Francis Johnson
