= Thomas Walker (academic) =

English academic (17th century)

Master of University College, Oxford
- In office 31 August 1632 – 10 July 1648
- In office 1660 – 5 December 1665

Personal details
- Died: 5 December 1665
- Occupation: Academic administrator

Thomas Walker (died 5 December 1665) was an Oxford academic and administrator. He was twice Master of University College, Oxford.

Walker was a Fellow at St John's College, Oxford. On 31 August 1632, he was elected as the Master of University College, with the support of the Vice-Chancellor of Oxford University.

Work on the dining hall on the south side of the main quad at University College started in 1640, but this was disrupted by the English Civil War that commenced in 1642.

On 8 July 1648, Obadiah Walker, Henry Watkins, and Thomas Silvester were expelled from Oxford University for their Royalist sympathies. On 10 July, the Master, Thomas Walker, was removed as well. Joshua Hoyle was installed in his place during the Commonwealth. However, with the Restoration, he returned as Master in 1660 until his death in 1665. He noted in the College Register, Mense Julii die x, 1648, amotus est Dorctor Walker hujus Collegii magister legitimus per visitatores illegitimos.

Walker was married to Jane Robinson, who was niece of the Archbishop of Canterbury. He was buried in the north aisle of St Peter's-in-the-East, Oxford.

Academic offices
Preceded by John Bancroft	Master of University College, Oxford; 1632–1648	Succeeded by Joshua Hoyle
Preceded by Francis Johnson	Master of University College, Oxford; 1660–1665	Succeeded by Richard Clayton
