= Foston =

Foston may refer to:

== Places ==
- Foston, Derbyshire, England
- Foston on the Wolds, East Riding of Yorkshire, England
- Foston, Leicestershire, England (deserted)
- Foston, Lincolnshire, England
- Foston, North Yorkshire, England

== People ==
- Thomas Foston, a Master of University College, Oxford, England (1393–6)
