= John Crayford =

English academic (died 1547)

John Crayford (died 1547) was a Master of both Clare College, Cambridge, and University College, Oxford, England. Martyn was unusual in being a Master of colleges at both the universities of Oxford and Cambridge. He was the only Master of University College to also have been a Master at a Cambridge college.

Crayford was a Fellow at University College in the early 1520s. He was Master of Clare College, Cambridge from 1530 to 1539 and Vice-Chancellor of the University of Cambridge during 1534–36. He helped in the university's support for Henry VIII's divorce from Catherine of Aragon in 1533. From 1545 to 1547 he was Archdeacon of Berkshire. Later he became Master of University College from 1546 until his unexpected death in August 1547, only a year later.

Academic offices
Preceded by Edmund Natures	Master of Clare College, Cambridge; 1530–1539	Succeeded by Roland Swynbourne
Preceded by Simon Heynes	Vice-Chancellor of Cambridge University; 1534–1536	Succeeded by Francis Mallet
Preceded by Leonard Hutchinson	Master of University College, Oxford; 1546–1547	Succeeded by Richard Salveyn
