= Salvin =

Salvin is a surname. Notable people with the surname include:

- Anthony Salvin (1799–1881), English architect
- Anthony Salvin (academic), Master of University College, Oxford (1557–58)
- Francis Henry Salvin (1817–1904), English hunter and writer
- Osbert Salvin FRS (1835–1898), English naturalist, best known for co-authoring Biologia Centrali-Americana (1879–1915)
- Richard Salvin, Master of University College, Oxford (1547–51)

== See also ==
- Carnosic acid, a natural chemical compound found in rosemary
- Thorpe Salvin, village and a civil parish in South Yorkshire, England
- Salvin's albatross
- Salvin's anetia
- Salvin's big-eyed bat
- Salvin's cichlid
- Salvin's curassow
- Salvin's spiny pocket mouse
