= Edmund Lacey =

15th-century Bishop of Exeter and Bishop of Hereford

- Bishop of Exeter
- Arms of Bishop Edmund Lacy: Azure, three shoveler's heads erased argent
- Appointed: 15 July 1420
- Term ended: 18 September 1455
- Predecessor: John Catterick
- Successor: John Hales
- Previous post: Bishop of Hereford

Orders
- Consecration: 18 July 1417

Personal details
- Died: 18 September 1455
- Denomination: Catholic

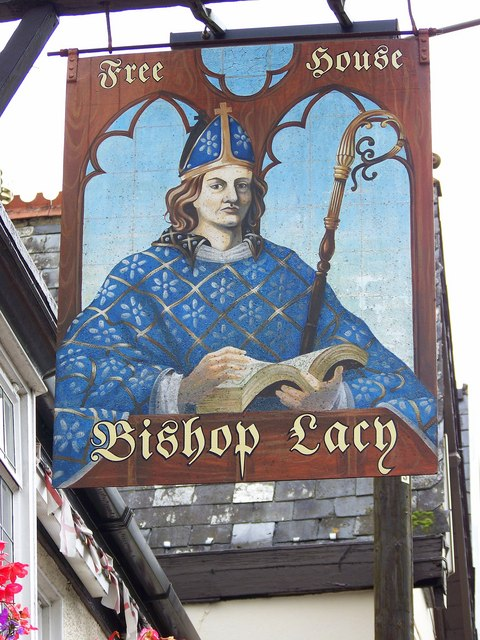
Sign of the Bishop Lacy public house in Chudleigh, Devon

Edmund Lacey (or Lacy; died 1455) was a medieval Bishop of Hereford and Bishop of Exeter in England.

Lacey was educated at University College, Oxford, where he was a mature commoner, then Fellow, and subsequently Master of the College from 1398 until around 1401. The College prospered and developed under him, as well as under John Appleton and John Castell who followed him.

In 1401, Lacey was appointed Canon of the ninth stall at St George's Chapel, Windsor Castle, a position he held until 1417.

Around 1414, Lacey was appointed Dean of the Chapel Royal, accompanying King Henry V to the Battle of Agincourt in 1415. He was elected to the see of Hereford between 21 January and 17 February 1417 and consecrated on 18 April 1417. He was then translated to the see of Exeter on 15 July 1420. While bishop at Exeter, Lacey promoted the cult of the Archangel Raphael, proclaiming the feast in his diocese in 1443, and working throughout England to institute the cult.

Lacey died on 18 September 1455. His executors appear as John Cobethorn, Henry Webber, John Germyn and John Burnebyry, all church officials, in 1460;

== Bibliography ==
- Fryde, E. B.; Greenway, D. E.; Porter, S.; Roy, I. (1996). Handbook of British Chronology (Third revised ed.). Cambridge, UK: Cambridge University Press. ISBN 0-521-56350-X.
- Swanson, R. N. (1995). Religion and Devotion in Europe, c.1215–c.1515. Cambridge Medieval Textbooks. Cambridge, UK: Cambridge University Press. ISBN 0-521-37950-4.

Academic offices
Preceded by Thomas Duffield	Master of University College, Oxford; 1398–c.1401	Succeeded by John Appleton
Catholic Church titles
Preceded by Robert Mascall	Bishop of Hereford; 1417–1420	Succeeded by Thomas Polton
Preceded by John Catterick	Bishop of Exeter; 1420–1455	Succeeded by John Hales
