= Leonard Hutchinson =

Leonard Hutchinson (died 1554) was a Fellow and Master of University College, Oxford, England.

Hutchinson was for a time a Fellow of Balliol College, Oxford. He was first recorded as being a Fellow of University College in 1514–15. Subsequently, he was Master of the college from 1518 to 1546, a long period (28 years), especially for the time. Hutchinson was also the rector at Bladon (1534–41) and the vicar of Yarnton (1535 – c.1540), both north of Oxford.

In 1518, the Master's Lodgings were still in the tower above the main entrance of the college. In 1531, he moved to larger accommodation at Little University Hall in the High Street, next to the college. He appointed a number of members of his family to be fellows of the college. The first commoner undergraduates started at University College during Hutchinson's time as Master. Thus University College moved from being largely a postgraduate institution without formal teaching to also being a graduate teaching institution, as most Oxford colleges are today. Hutchinson lived on until 1554, eight years after he ceased being Master of University College. It was unusual for the time to take such a retirement.

Academic offices
Preceded by Ralph Hamsterley	Master of University College, Oxford; 1518–1546	Succeeded by John Crayford
