= James Franck Bright =

British historian and Master of University College, Oxford

James Franck Bright D.D.
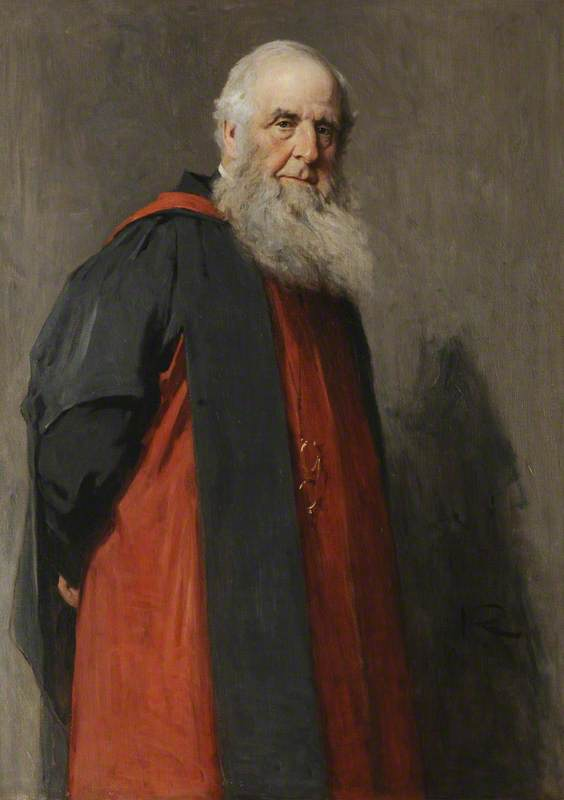
- James Franck Bright, by George Reid
- Born: 29 May 1832; London, England
- Died: 23 October 1920 (aged 88); Ditchingham, Norfolk, England
- Occupation: Historian
- Known for: Mastership of University College, Oxford
- Board member of: Radcliffe Infirmary (Treasurer); Oxford City Council
- Parent(s): Richard Bright; Eliza Follett
- Relatives: Sir William Webb Follett QC MP; Brent Follett QC MP; Henry Bright MP (uncles)

Academic background
- Education: Rugby School
- Alma mater: University College, Oxford

Academic work
- Discipline: History
- Sub-discipline: Victorian era; biographies
- Institutions: Marlborough College; University College, Oxford
- Notable works: History of Victorian England, "The Growth of Democracy", and biographies of the Holy Roman Empress Maria Theresa and Emperor Joseph II.

James Franck Bright (29 May 1832 – 23 October 1920) was a British historian and Master of University College, Oxford.

== Early life ==
He was born in London, the son of the physician Richard Bright, who described Bright's disease, and Eliza Follett, sister of lawyer-politicians William Webb Follett and Brent Follett. He was educated at Rugby School and at University College, Oxford (matriculated 1851 aged 18, graduated B.A. 1855, M.A. 1858, B.D. and D.D. 1884).

From 1856 to 1872, Bright was a schoolmaster at Marlborough College, where he was Head of the Modern Department, under George Granville Bradley as Master. He wrote the necessary textbooks himself, including "History of England".

== University College, Oxford ==
Bradley became Master of University College, Oxford in 1870; he recruited Bright as a history tutor there in 1872, tutoring at Balliol, New and University Colleges. Bright became Fellow and Dean of University College in 1874, and succeeded Bradley as Master of University College from 1881 to 1906.

Bright was a progressive leader at Oxford, helping to improve teaching standards and arguing that theological degrees could be awarded to non-members of the Church of England. In 1882, he was one of the first dons of Oxford University to allow women students to attend his lectures, in University College Hall.

In 1890 Bright was shot by Catherine Theresa Riordan in an incident at University College, but survived. Riordan claimed to have been engaged to John Thomas Augustus Haines, junior dean of the college and that the engagement had been broken off because of one of Bright's daughters. Haines resigned his fellowship. Riordan was sentenced to six years' penal servitude for attempted murder.

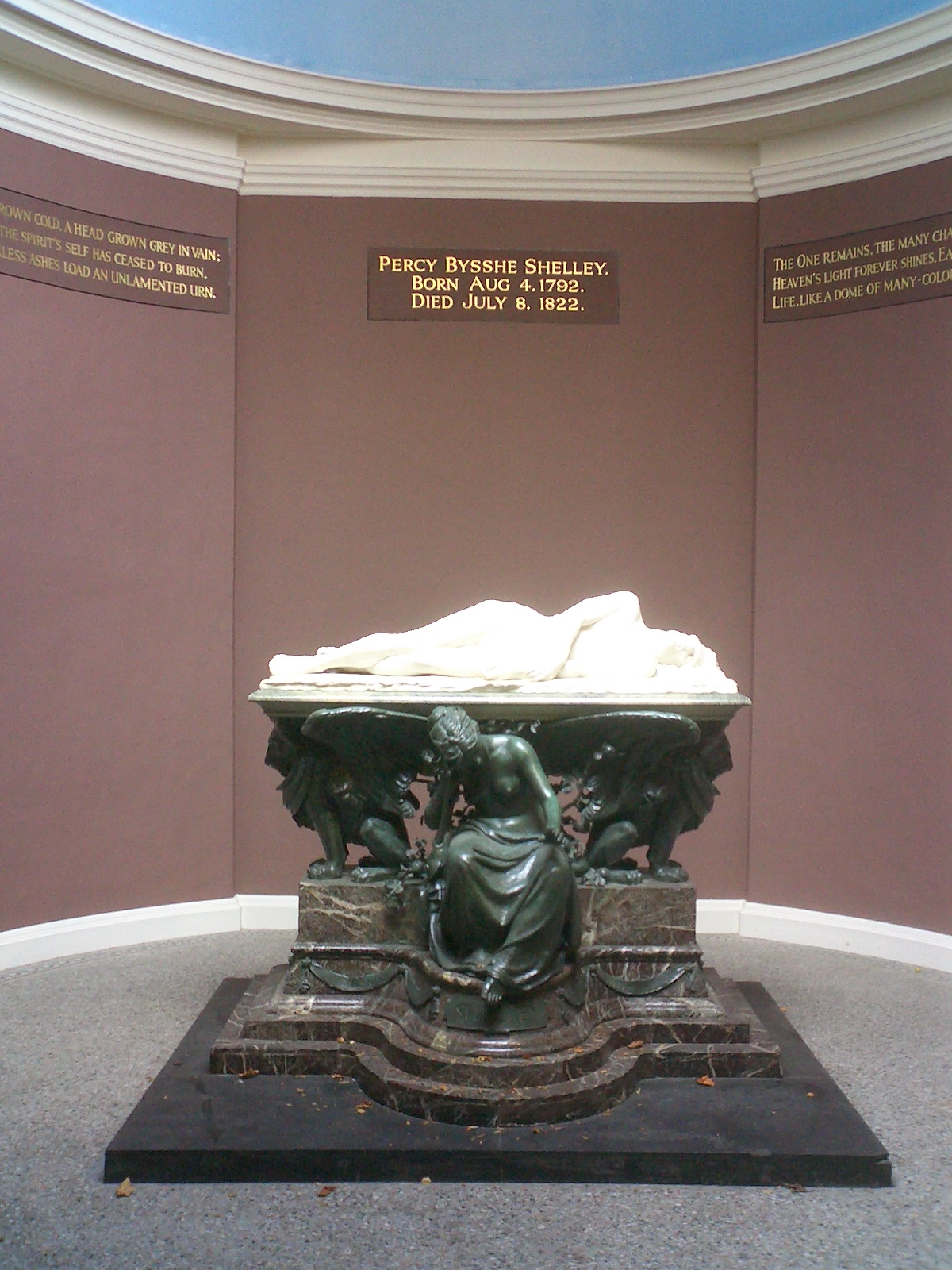
The Shelley Memorial at University College, opened on 14 June 1893 during the mastership of Franck Bright.

The Shelley Memorial was installed during Bright's mastership, celebrating the life of the poet Percy Bysshe Shelley (1792–1822), an alumnus of University College. At an opening ceremony on 14 June 1893, Lady Jane Shelley, the widow of the poet's son, Sir Percy Shelley, 3rd Baronet (1819–1889), presented the Master with a golden key, giving access to the chamber containing the memorial. Bright described Shelley as "the rebel of eighty years ago", "the hero of the present century", and "a prophet who prophesied good things, and not bad".

== Interests and death ==
In addition to academic activities, Bright was a member of the Oxford City Council, and Treasurer of the Radcliffe Infirmary. He died at Ditchingham Hall, Norfolk, on 22 October 1920. He was lord of the manor of Brockbury in Colwall, Herefordshire, having inherited the estate by the will of his uncle Henry Bright MP in 1869.

Some of Bright's sermon manuscripts are held in the University College archives.

== Family ==
In 1864 Bright married Emmeline Theresa Wickham, daughter of Edmund Dawe Wickham (1810–1894), vicar of Holmwood. They had four daughters:

- Margaret, the eldest, married in 1886 William Carr.
- Alice married in 1888 Francis Newbolt.
- Emily, the third daughter, married in 1902 John Arthur Gibbs, son of the Rev. John Lomax Gibbs.
- Evelyn, the youngest, married in 1898 Hubert Burge.

== Selected works ==
Bright published:

- English History for the Use of Public Schools
- Joseph II (1905)
- Maria Theresa
- The Growth of Democracy, a history of Victorian England

== Sources ==
- Hebron, Stephen; Denlinger, Elizabeth C. (2010). "Shelly and Oxford". Shelley's Ghost: Reshaping the image of a literary family. Bodleian Library, University of Oxford. ISBN 978-1-85124-339-6.

Academic offices
Preceded by George Granville Bradley	Master of University College, Oxford; 1881–1906	Succeeded by Reginald Walter Macan
