= Thomas Bennet (academic) =

British academic

Thomas Bennet, also spelt Benet, was an English academic at the University of Oxford, active during the late seventeenth century.

He was an undergraduate and Fellow of University College, Oxford and in 1691 was elected as Master of his college.

Bennet was a relative of Sir Simon Bennet, also a member of University College, whose settlement to the college in 1662 funded the Bennet Fellowship. Thomas Bennet held this Fellowship for a while. This was seen by the other fellows as a barrier to his becoming Master of the college, but after a dispensation he was elected on 3 March 1691. He died in 1692 and was succeeded by Arthur Charlett.

Academic offices
Preceded by Edward Farrer	Master of University College, Oxford; 1691–1692	Succeeded by Arthur Charlett
