= Baumber =

Village and civil parish in the East Lindsey district of Lincolnshire, England

Coordinates: 53.250324°N 0.169477°W

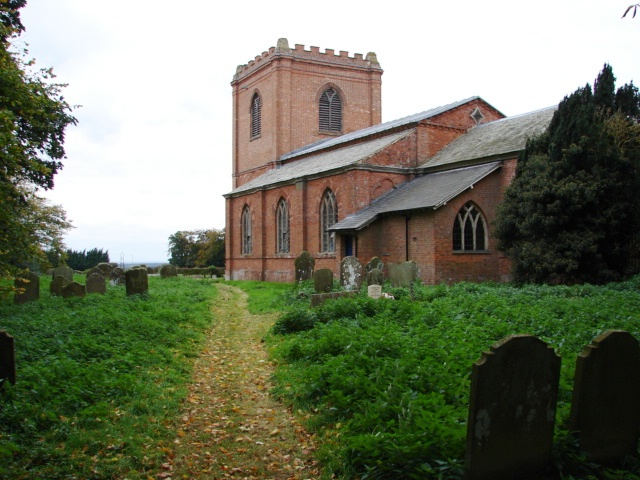
- St Swithin's Church, Baumber

- Location within Lincolnshire
- Population: 223 (including Great Sturton, 2011)
- OS grid reference: TF222741
  - London: 120 mi (190 km) S
- Civil parish: Baumber
- District: East Lindsey
- Shire county: Lincolnshire
- Region: East Midlands
- Country: England
- Sovereign state: United Kingdom
- Post town: HORNCASTLE
- Postcode district: LN9
- Dialling code: 01507
- Police: Lincolnshire
- Fire: Lincolnshire
- Ambulance: East Midlands
- UK Parliament: Louth and Horncastle

Baumber (/ˈbɔːmbər/ BAWM-bər) is a village and civil parish in the East Lindsey district of Lincolnshire, England. It is situated approximately 4 miles (6 km) north-west from Horncastle, and at the junction of the B1225 and the A158 roads.

== History ==
The Grade I listed parish church is dedicated to Saint Swithin. Built in stone, it was encased in brick in 1758, and restored in 1892. The lower part of the tower and two doorways are Norman. A lead coffin found in the churchyard is included in a list of Roman coffins found in or near Horncastle. Under the chancel of the church is the Newcastle family vault, which was their place of burial until 1820, prior to the disposal of their Baumber estates. There are church inscriptions to Francis, the grandson of Henry Clinton, Earl of Lincoln, who died in 1681, and Priscilla his wife who died in 1679. An incised stone slab to John Eland (or Ealand), who died in 1463 or 1473, and his two wives, formerly in the floor, lies against the west wall of the north aisle.

The manor of Baumber was held by Thomas Dighton, whose daughter and heiress married Edward Clinton, 2nd son of the first earl of Lincoln. On failure of an heir in the elder branch, the earldom devolved to the son of this Edward, whose successors obtained the Dukedom of Newcastle. The estate continued in the possession of the family until it was sold to Thomas Livesey of Blackburn, Lancashire in 1810.

The manor and estate was centred on Stourton Hall (53.2630, -0.1762), built in 1810 by Joseph Livesey It was later rebuilt and enlarged with Ancaster Stone, but was demolished in 1955. Livesey's descendants held the manor into the 20th century.

A Wesleyan chapel was built at Baumber in 1844 and converted in the 1980s into a family home.

In the 19th century the parish had repute for its racing stables, at which the 1875 Derby winner Galopin was bred.

=== World War II ===
A Ju 88 was shot down in early July 1942 at 8.25pm, with all four Germans killed. Another Ju 88 crashed at Aswardby. Four Spitfires of 303 Sqn had left RAF Kirton in Lindsey, to follow the two Ju 88s. These were extremely experienced Polish pilots. Popek shot down Ju 88 'M2-BK'. The two Ju 88 aircraft had bombed north-west Derbyshire, and machine-gunned Chatsworth House.

== Community ==
According to the 2001 Census Baumber had a population of 168.

The village public house, the Red Lion on Lincoln Road, has been demolished to make way for housing. Although Baumber Primary School has closed due to demographic decline. It has since been taken over by Springwell Lincolnshire, part of the Wellspring Academy Trust, as an alternative provision for students no longer accessing mainstream education.

Baumber has Lincolnshire's most intact brick kiln, a Grade II listed structure. The kiln, renovated in the 1990s, lies on private land on the western side of the village, with its former brick clay pits now used as fishing lakes. Both lie on land once part of Brickyard Farm, Lincoln Road. There is no public right of access to the kiln.

At Baumber is a farm which raises red deer for venison, sells wood and christmas trees, and hosts outdoor events.

Also, there is the Walled Garden Baumber, formerly the Kitchen Garden to Stourton Hall, now it is a free-entry garden for the public to look round, there is also a small tearoom.
