= Patrick Mollison =

British haematologist

Pat Mollison CBE FRCP FRS
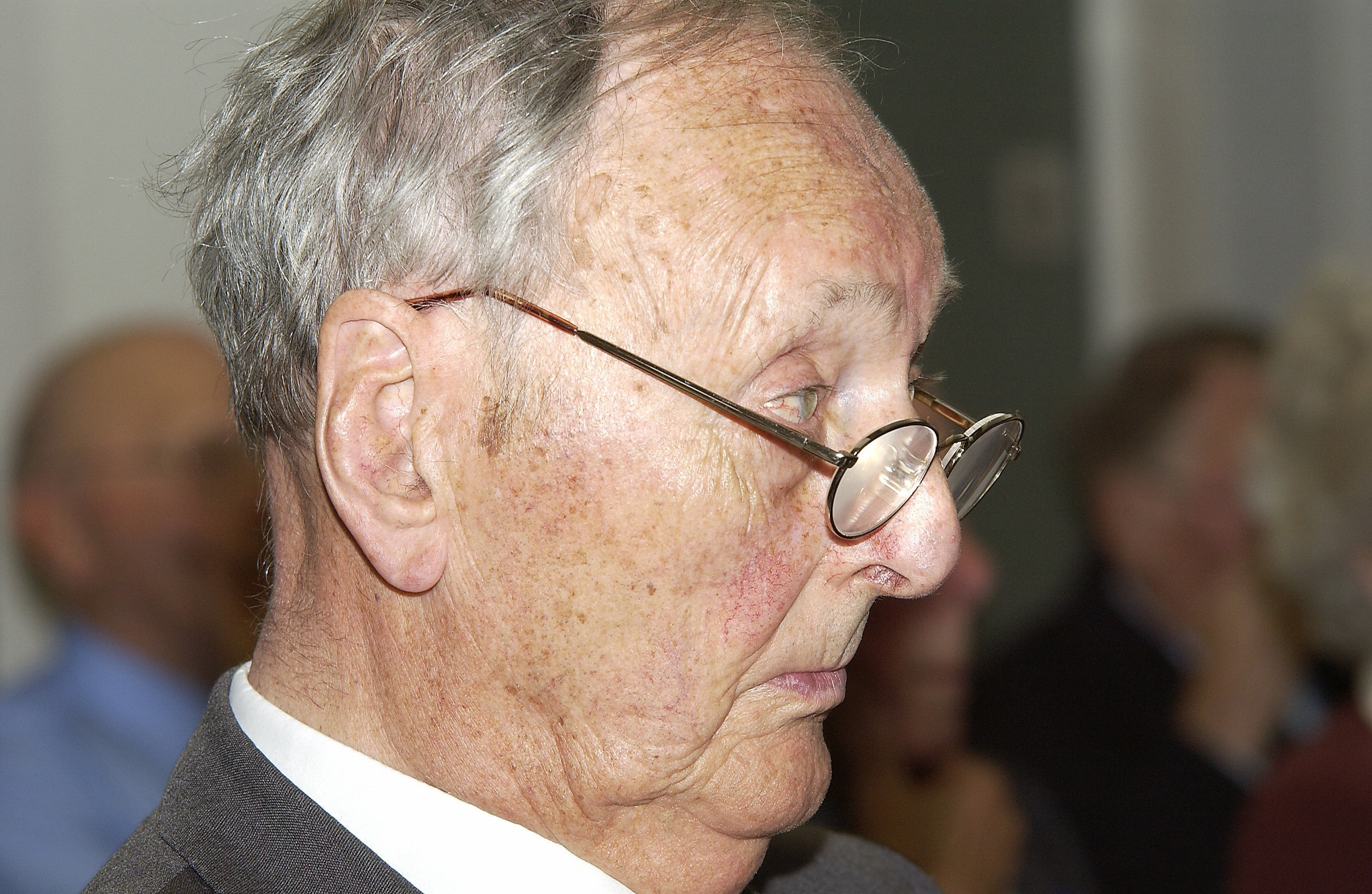
- Mollison in 2003
- Born: Patrick Loudon Mollison; 17 March 1914
- Died: 26 November 2011 (aged 97)

Patrick Loudon Mollison, CBE, FRCP, FRS (17 March 1914 – 26 November 2011), was a British haematologist, described as 'the father of transfusion medicine'.

== Life ==
Mollison was born on 17 March 1914, to Beatrice Marjorie, née Walker, and William Mayhew Mollison. His father was an ear, nose and throat surgeon at Guy's Hospital, and his paternal grandfather, William Loudon Mollison, was a Scottish mathematician and Master of Clare College, Cambridge.

He attended St Peter's School, Seaford, followed by Rugby School, then underwent medical training at Clare College and St Thomas' Hospital, qualifying in 1938.

He joined the Royal Army Medical Corps in 1943, during World War II, serving in Germany and visiting the newly liberated Bergen-Belsen concentration camp. He also visited Burma, by which time he was a lieutenant colonel.

He was Director of the Medical Research Council's Blood Transfusion Research Unit (later the Experimental Haematology Unit), from 1946 to 1979; and Professor of Haematology at St Mary's Hospital, London from 1962 to 1979.

Elizabeth II consulted him on each of her four pregnancies, and he was made a Commander of the Order of the British Empire (CBE) in the 1979 New Year Honours. He was also elected a Fellow of the Royal College of Physicians (FRCP) and a Fellow of the Royal Society (FRS).

He died on 26 November 2011.

== Significant works ==
- Mollison, P; Loutit, J (1943). "Disodium-citrate-glucose mixture as a blood preservative". British Medical Journal. 2 (4327): 744–745. doi:10.1136/bmj.2.4327.744. PMC 2285557. PMID 20785169.
- Mollison, P (1946). "Observations on cases of starvation at Belsen". British Medical Journal. 1 (4435): 4–8. doi:10.1136/bmj.1.4435.4. PMC 2057829. PMID 20786496.
- Mollison, P (1951). Blood transfusion in clinical medicine. Blackwell Scientific Publications.
