= Richard Clayton (academic) =

- Born: Unknown; Yorkshire, England
- Died: June 10, 1676; Salisbury, England
- Occupations: Academic, priest
- Known for: Master of University College, Oxford

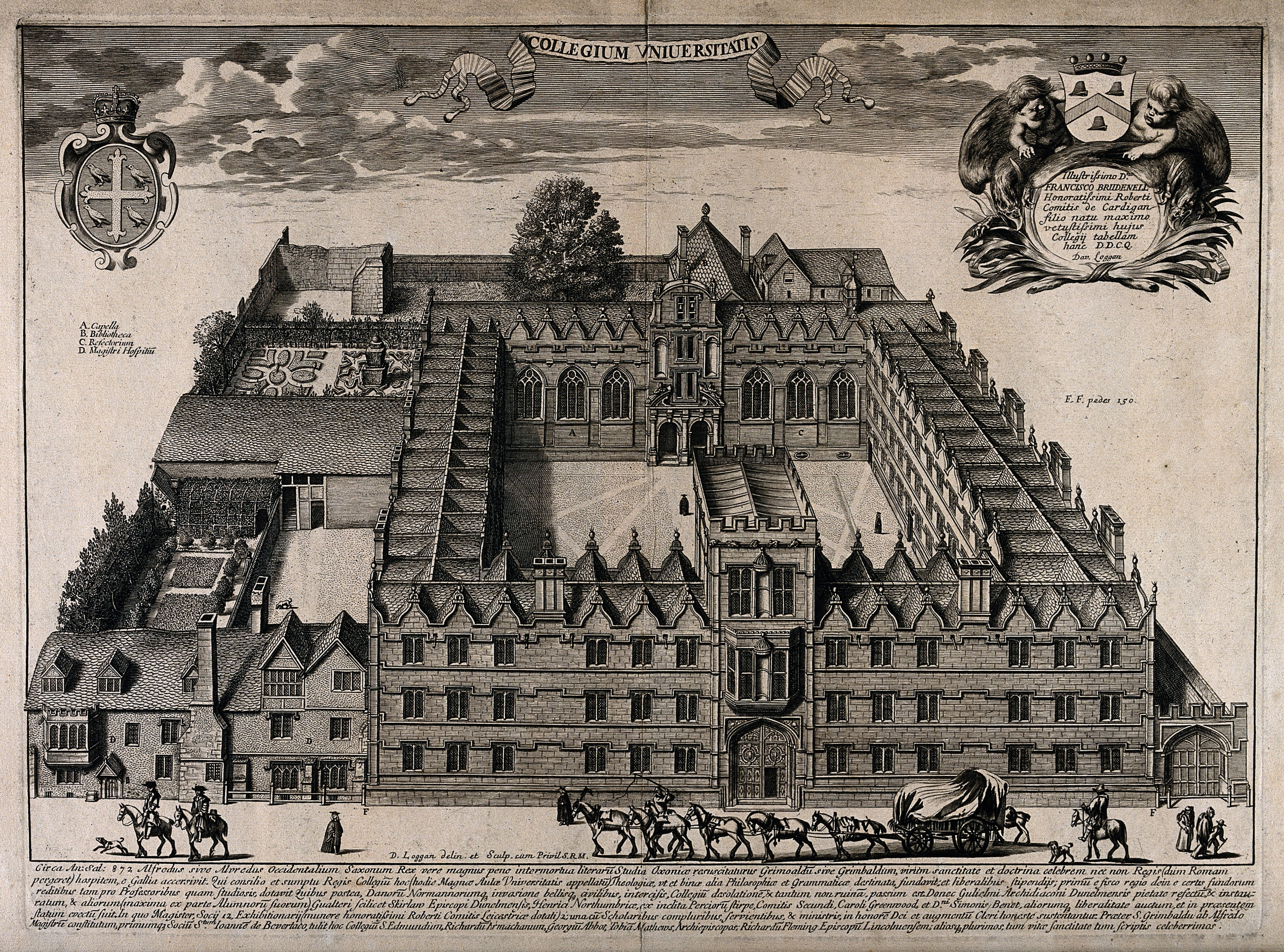
An engraved aerial view of University College by David Loggan in Oxonia Illustrata (1675), during the mastership of Richard Clayton.

Richard Clayton (died 10 June 1676) was a Canon, Oxford academic and administrator. He was Master of University College, Oxford, from 1665 until his death in 1676.

Clayton was originally from Yorkshire and matriculated at University College in 1618. In 1629, he was elected as a Percy Fellow at University College in Oxford. He was bursar of the college from 1631 to 1634 and 1636–37. He resigned from his Fellowship in 1639 to escape from the Civil War.

Richard Clayton's son, John, matriculated at University College in 1657.

Clayton became a Prebendary and then Canon of Salisbury Cathedral from 1661. He spent more time in Salisbury than in Oxford.

Clayton became Master of University College in 1665. From 1670 to the end of his Mastership, there was great concentration on rebuilding at the college. In 1670, funding for completion of the library was solicited. Between 1670 and 1674, funds were sought for completing the main quadrangle.

During Clayton's time as Master, from 1666, John Radcliffe (1650–1714) was the pupil of Obadiah Walker, the next Master of University College. John Radcliffe was subsequently physician to the King and a major benefactor of the college, including the Radcliffe Quad, immediately to the east of the main quad.

In 1674, the tradition of every new Fellow and student at University College signing an Admissions Register was started. This has continued to the present day.

Clayton died in Salisbury, Wiltshire, in 1676, while still Master of University College.

Academic offices
Preceded by Thomas Walker	Master of University College, Oxford; 1665–1676	Succeeded by Obadiah Walker
