= Thomas Francis Dale =

English cleric and sporting writer

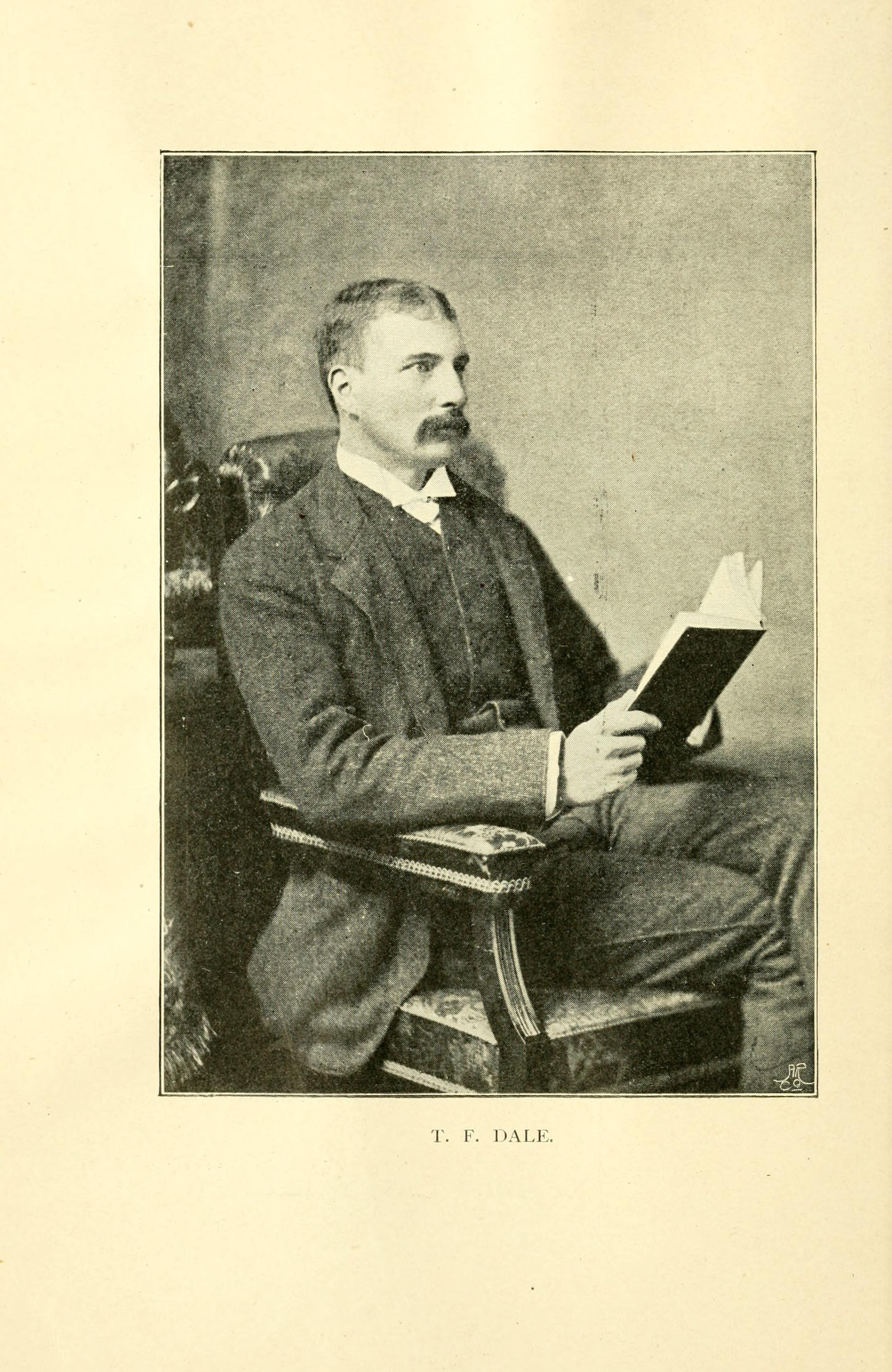
Thomas Francis Dale

Thomas Francis Dale (1848–1923) was an English army chaplain, known as an author on fox hunting and polo.

== Life ==
He was the son of the Rev. Pelham Dale and his wife Mary Francis, and was educated at Merchant Taylors' School. He matriculated at The Queen's College, Oxford in 1867, graduating B.A. in 1870, M.A. in 1874.

Dale was rector of Jarrow from 1875 to 1876, and then for two years was secretary of the Additional Curates' Society, Northern District, being a member of the Society of the Holy Cross. In 1878 he became a chaplain in Bombay. Over the period 1876 to 1880, his father, an Anglican ritualist who also joined the Society of the Holy Cross, defied liturgical restrictions imposed by the Court of Arches and ended up in prison.

From 1885 to 1896, Dale was on the ecclesiastical establishment of Amritsar.

Dale acted as manager for the Ranelagh Club polo team; this was after 1894, when Major F. Herbert, the founder, gave up the position. He wrote on polo ponies and was a member of the Polo Pony Society. He died at Burley, Hampshire on 13 October 1923.

== Works ==
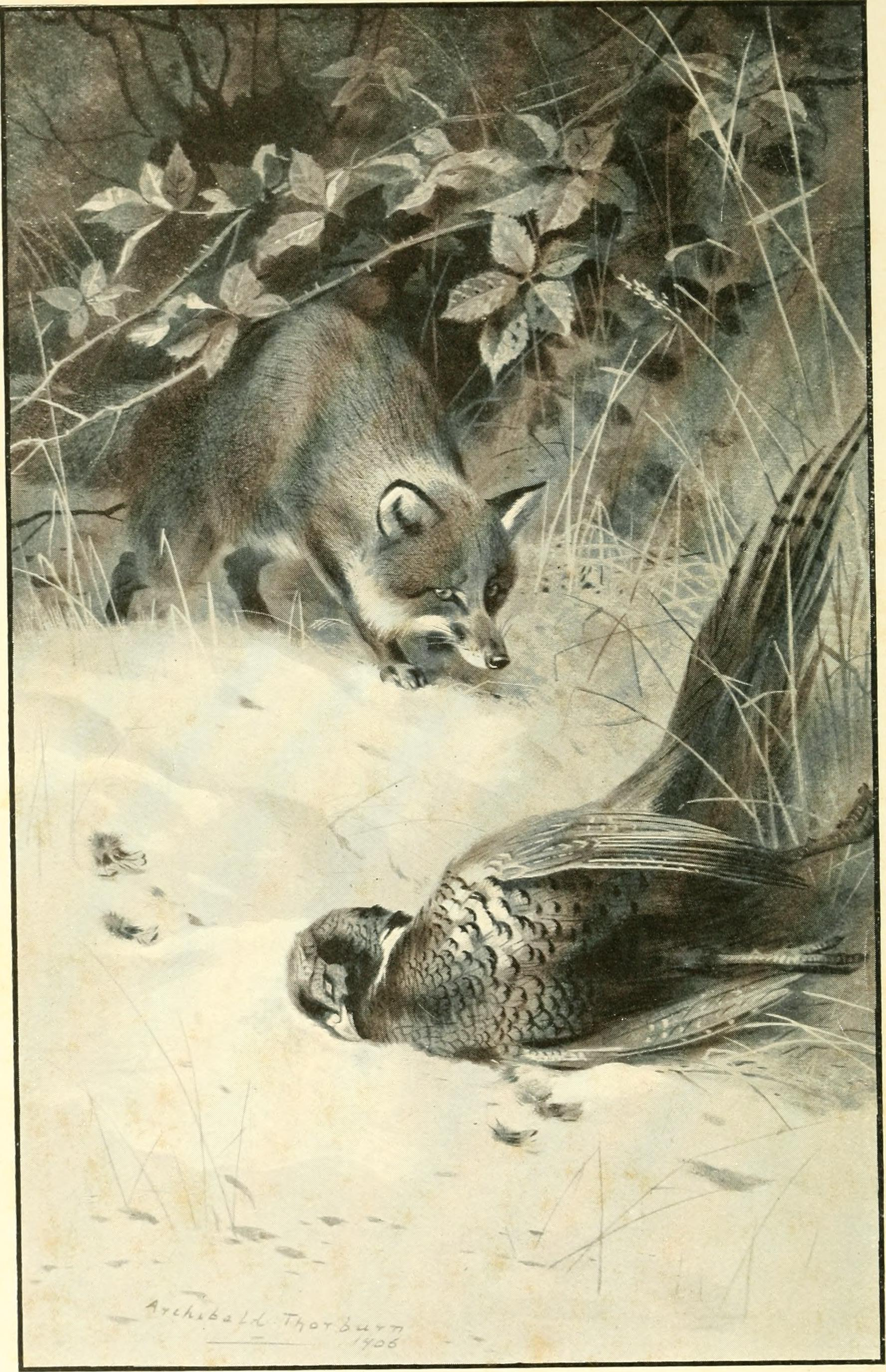
"Gleaning after the Hunters", illustration from The Fox (1906) by Thomas Francis Dale, Godfrey Douglas Giles, and Archibald Thorburn

- Riding (1891), with Robert Weir and James Moray Brown.
- Game of Polo (1897)
- Riding and Polo Ponies (1899)
- The History of the Belvoir Hunt (1899)
- Riding, Driving and Kindred Sports (1899), vol. 1 of The Sports Library
- The Eighth Duke of Beaufort and the Badminton Hunt: With a Sketch of the Rise of the Somerset Family (1901)
- Fox-hunting in the Shires (1903)
- Polo Past and Present (1905)
- The Fox (1906), illustrations by Archibald Thorburn and G. Giles.
- The Stable Handbook (1907)
- Polo at Home and Abroad (1915)

In The Field, Dale wrote under the pseudonym "Stoneclink". He wrote a novel about a fox, Two Fortunes and Old Patch (1898), with Frances Elizabeth Slaughter, another sporting writer. In her 1907 book on dogs, she included "Bruce", who belonged to Dale, and a spaniel belonging to his sister Helen Dale.

== Family ==
Dale married Frances Marianna Cockburn Witty (1849–1940), daughter of the solicitor Richard Henry Witty, in 1869. Their children included:

- Thomas Cyril Dale (1870–1937), cleric.
- Evelyn Mary Frances Dale (1873–1960)
- Francis Harold Dale (1876–1940)
