= List of masters of University College, Oxford =

The College's coat of arms

The head of University College, Oxford is known as the Master.

University College was founded in Oxford, England, through a legacy from William of Durham in 1249. The names of early Masters are not known. The earliest surviving College Register starts from 1509 and dates before that are uncertain.

Below is a list of masters of University College, Oxford.

- Roger de Aswardby (fl. 1353–62)
- William Kexby (fl. 1376–79)
- Thomas Foston (1393–96)
- Thomas Duffield (1396–98)
- Edmund Lacy (1398–c.1401)
- John Appleton (c.1401–08)
- John Castell (c.1408–20)
- Robert Burton (1420–23/4)
- Richard Witton (1423/4–28)
- Thomas Benwell (1428–41)
- John Martyn (1441–73)
- William Gregford (1473–87/8)
- John Roxborough (1487/8–1509)
- Ralph Hamsterley (1509–18)
- Leonard Hutchinson (1518–46)
- John Crayford (1546–47)
- Richard Salveyn (1547–51)
- George Ellison (1551–57)
- Anthony Salveyn (1557–58)
- James Dugdale (1558–61)
- Thomas Caius (1561–72)
- William James (1572–84)
- Anthony Gate (1584–97)
- George Abbot (1597–1610)
- John Bancroft (1610–32)
- Thomas Walker (1632–48)
- Joshua Hoyle (1648–54)
- Francis Johnson (1655–60)
- Thomas Walker (1660–65)
- Richard Clayton (1665–76)
- Obadiah Walker (1676–89)
- Edward Farrer (1689–91)
- Thomas Bennet (1691–92)
- Arthur Charlett (1692–1722)
- William Dennison, 1722–29)
- Thomas Cockman (1722/29–45)
- John Browne (1745–64)
- Nathan Wetherell (1764–1807)
- James Griffith (1808–21)
- George Rowley (1821–36)
- Frederick Charles Plumptre (1836–70)
- George Granville Bradley (1870–81)
- James Franck Bright (1881–1906)
- Reginald Walter Macan (1906–23)
- Michael Ernest Sadler (1923–34)
- Arthur Blackburne Poynton (1935–37)
- William Henry Beveridge (1937–45)
- John Herbert Severn Wild (1945–51)
- Arthur Lehman Goodhart (1951–63)
- John Redcliffe-Maud (1963–76)
- Arnold Goodman (1976–86)
- Kingman Brewster (1986–88)
- John Albery (1989–97)
- Robin Butler (1998–2008)
- Ivor Crewe (2008–2020)
- Valerie Amos (2020–)

A number of portraits of former Masters hang in University College Hall. The University College archives hold the papers of many Masters of the College.
