= Edward Farrer =

Edward Farrer (died 18 February 1691) was an Oxford academic and administrator. At the end of his life, he was Master of University College, Oxford for only two years, dying on his close-stool.

Farrer studied at the University of St Andrews, Trinity College, Cambridge, and Magdalen Hall, where he gained a Bachelor of Arts degree in January 1651. Farrer was elected a Fellow of University College in 1651.

He was a curate at Flamstead in Hertfordshire for twenty-five years.

Academic offices
Preceded by Obadiah Walker	Master of University College, Oxford; 1689–1691	Succeeded by Thomas Bennet
