= John Hales (bishop of Exeter) =

15th-century Bishop of Exeter-elect

- Bishop of Exeter-elect
- Appointed: 20 October 1455
- Term ended: about 4 February 1456
- Predecessor: Edmund Lacey
- Successor: George Neville

Personal details
- Denomination: Catholic

John Hales was a medieval Bishop of Exeter.

Hales was provided on 20 October 1455 but was never consecrated as he resigned about 4 February 1456.

== Citations ==
Catholic Church titles
Preceded by Edmund Lacey	Bishop of Exeter; 1455–1456 resigned see	Succeeded by George Neville
