= William Gregford =

William Gregford (a.k.a. William Gregforth, died 1487/88) was a Master of University College, Oxford, England.

Gregford was a Fellow at University College from 1453/4. He was vicar of Shipton-under-Wychwood in west Oxfordshire from 1465. He became Master in 1473 until his death in 1487 or 1488. The College Chapel was dedicated on 30 April 1476, during Gregford's time as Master.

Academic offices
Preceded by John Martyn	Master of University College, Oxford; 1473–1487/88	Succeeded by John Roxborough
