= George Ellison (academic) =

George Ellison (died June 1557) was a Master of University College, Oxford, England.

Ellison was a Fellow of University College and was elected Master of the college on 30 November 1551. He died in post in June 1557. Anthony Salveyn, who succeeded Ellison as Master of University College from 1557 to 1558, was probably Richard Salveyn's brother, who preceded Ellison.

Academic offices
Preceded by Richard Salveyn	Master of University College, Oxford; 1551–1557	Succeeded by Anthony Salveyn
