= John Roxborough (academic administrator) =

John Roxborough (a.k.a. John Rokysburgh, died 1509) was a Master of University College, Oxford, England.

Roxborough, from Durham, held parishes in Hampshire, Wiltshire, and Surrey. He was Senior Fellow at University College when he was appointed Master in 1487 or 1488.

Academic offices
Preceded by William Gregford	Master of University College, Oxford; 1487/88–1509	Succeeded by Ralph Hamsterley
