= Ralph Hamsterley =

English Master of University College, Oxford

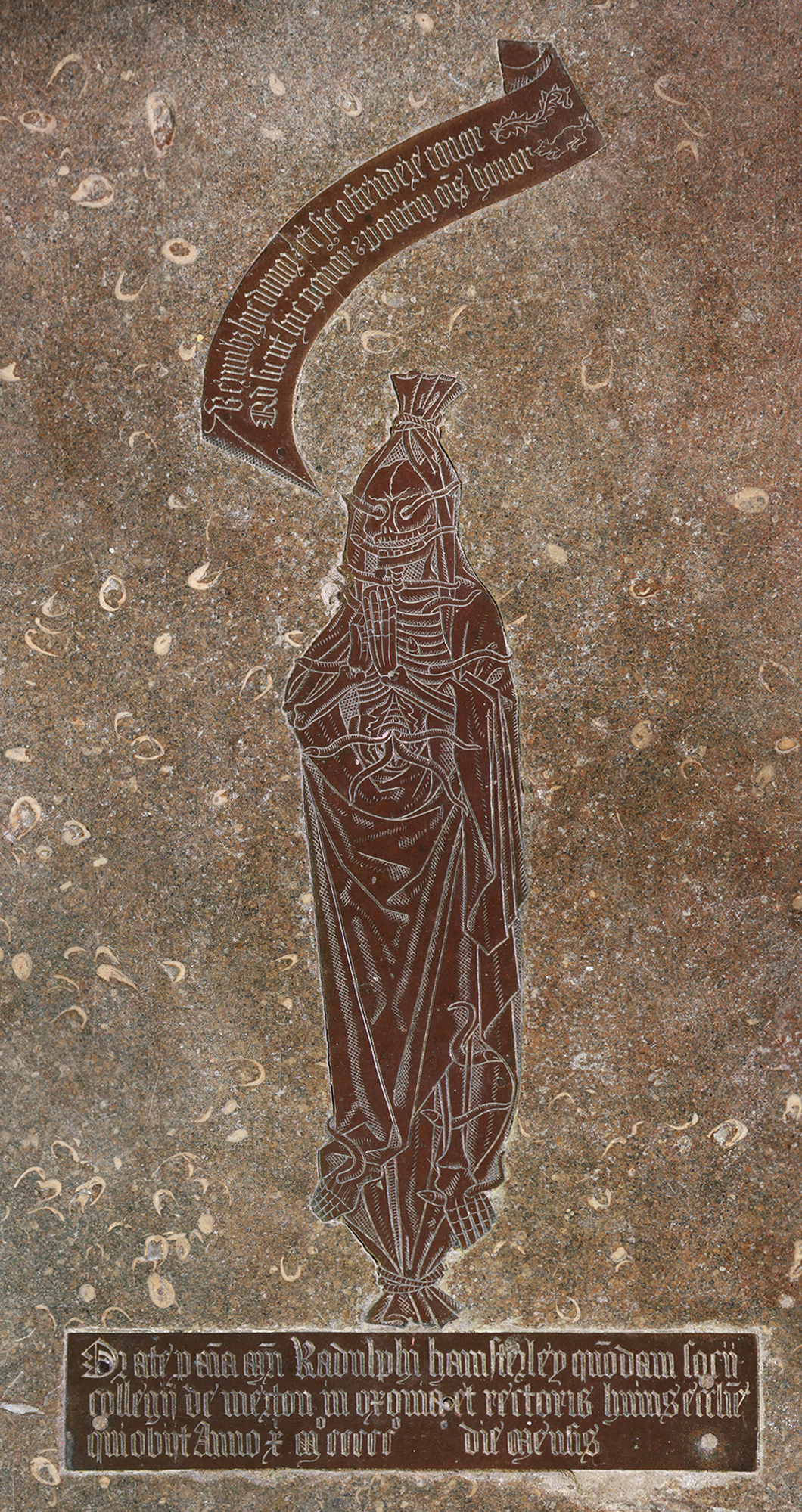
Monumental brass effigy of Hamsterley in Oddington, Oxfordshire

Ralph Hamsterley (died August 1518) was a Master of University College, Oxford, England.

Hamsterley was a Fellow of Merton College, Oxford, who became Principal of the adjoining St Alban Hall. He had livings and canonries in Durham, Essex, and Northamptonshire. He was rector at Oddington in Otmoor, west Oxfordshire. In 1507 and 1508, he failed to become Warden of Merton College. The following year, he was elected Master of University College by five fellows of the college on 23 September 1509. Hamsterley was an outsider with considerable means and the appointment was controversial. The Visitors of University College, including the Vice-Chancellor of Oxford University and others, were divided about the appointment. The matter was referred to the Chancellor of Oxford, William Warham, also Archbishop of Canterbury, whom he summoned to Lambeth Palace on 13 January 1510. Warham supported Hamsterley as Master.

Hamsterley had a memorial brass of himself placed in the College Chapel. He also gave brasses to Durham, Merton College, Queen's College, and the church at Oddington. A double-brass with an inscription was installed to his and Thomas Harpur's memory in Merton College Chapel. Thomas Harpur was a Fellow and later Warden of Merton College.

Academic offices
Preceded by John Roxborough	Master of University College, Oxford; 1509–1518	Succeeded by Leonard Hutchinson
