= Robert Burton (academic) =

Robert Burton was a Master of University College, Oxford, England.

Burton was a mature commoner and Fellow of University College. He was sentenced to excommunication for Lollardy leanings along with the then master John Castell, other Fellows, and indeed the entire College, in 1411 by the Archbishop of Canterbury, Thomas Arundel. He became Master of the College in 1420 and remained in the post until 1423 or 1424. A dispensation was granted to Burton in 1420 by Henry Chichele, the Archbishop of Canterbury at the time, to help the College due to its poor financial circumstances.

Burton continued with a successful career after his mastership.

Academic offices
Preceded by John Castell	Master of University College, Oxford; 1420–1423/24	Succeeded by Richard Witton
