= William James (bishop) =

English academic and Anglican bishop (1542–1617)

The Right Reverend William James
- Bishop of Durham
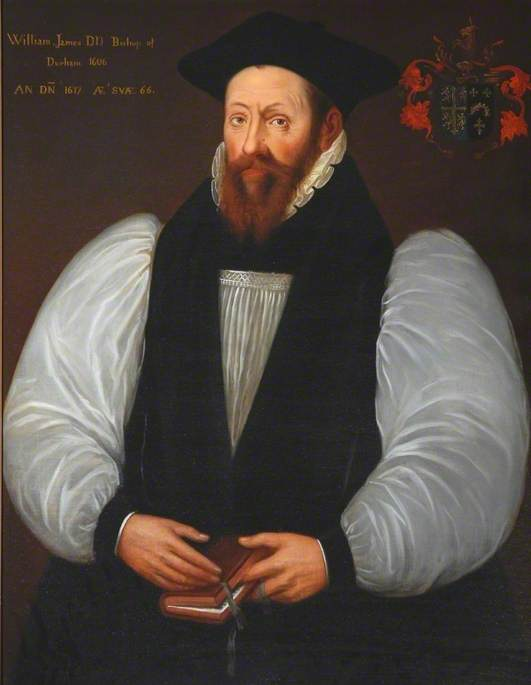
- Diocese: Diocese of Durham
- In office: September 1606 (conf.) – 1617 (died)
- Predecessor: Tobias Matthew
- Successor: Richard Neile
- Other posts: Master of University College, Oxford (1572–1584); Vice-Chancellor of Oxford University (1581–1582 & 1590–1592); Dean of Christ Church (2 September 1584 – 1596); Dean of Durham (5 June 1596 {installed

Personal details
- Born: 1542 Sandbach, Cheshire, England
- Died: 12 May 1617 (aged 74–75) Durham, County Durham, England
- Buried: Durham Cathedral
- Denomination: Anglican
- Parents: John James & Ellen Bolte
- Spouse: 1. Katherine (née Risby); 2. unknown person 3. Isabel (Atkinson née Rilley)
- Children: at least 2 (a son, Francis, and a daughter who married a Ferdinand Morecroft)
- Profession: academic
- Education: Christ Church, Oxford

Ordination history
History
Episcopal consecration
- Date: 7 September 1606

William James (1542 – 12 May 1617) was an English academic and bishop.

== Life ==
William James graduated with an MA degree at Christ Church, Oxford, in 1565. He was Master of University College, Oxford, in 1572, and Vice-Chancellor of the University of Oxford in 1581, and again in 1590. He became Dean of Christ Church in 1584.

James became Dean of Durham in 1596, where he was a witness to the decay of agriculture in northeast England. He was Bishop of Durham from 1606.

In early 1611, James had custody of Arbella Stuart, with the intention of the King to take her north to Durham. In the event, Arbella was moved from Lambeth to be confined at Barnet, while the bishop travelled north leaving Sir James Croft in charge, and for health reasons did not follow, being moved to East Barnet. When Arbella and her husband William Seymour, 2nd Duke of Somerset, (who was in the Tower of London) made simultaneous but badly coordinated escapes on 3 June 1611, she simply walked free.

Wolsingham School was founded on 19 June 1614 by James as the Bishop of Durham. The board of trustees included nine landowners who had all donated land to create the (then) boys' school. Each of the founding trustees was allowed to name two boys to be taught a basis education from the age of eight.

Academic offices
Preceded by Thomas Caius	Master of University College, Oxford; 1572–1584	Succeeded by Anthony Gate
Preceded by Tobias Matthew	Dean of Christ Church, Oxford; 1584–1596	Succeeded by Thomas Ravis
Preceded by Arthur Yeldard	Vice-Chancellor of Oxford University; 1581–1582	Succeeded by Robert Hovenden
Preceded by Nicholas Bond	Vice-Chancellor of Oxford University; 1590–1592	Succeeded by Nicholas Bond
Church of England titles
Preceded by Tobias Matthew	Dean of Durham; 1596–1606	Succeeded by Adam Newton
Preceded by Tobias Matthew	Bishop of Durham; 1606–1617	Succeeded by Richard Neile
