= Richard Witton =

Richard Witton (a.k.a. Richard Wytton) was a Master of University College, Oxford, England.

Witton was Fellow at University College and also a tenant of a College property. He became Master in 1423 or 1424, a post he held until 1428. He claimed that King Alfred had endowed the College with 78 Fellows, which was a complete fabrication. The College was poorer at the end of his time as Master.

Academic offices
Preceded by Robert Burton	Master of University College, Oxford; 1423/24–1428	Succeeded by Thomas Benwell
