= George Rowley (academic) =

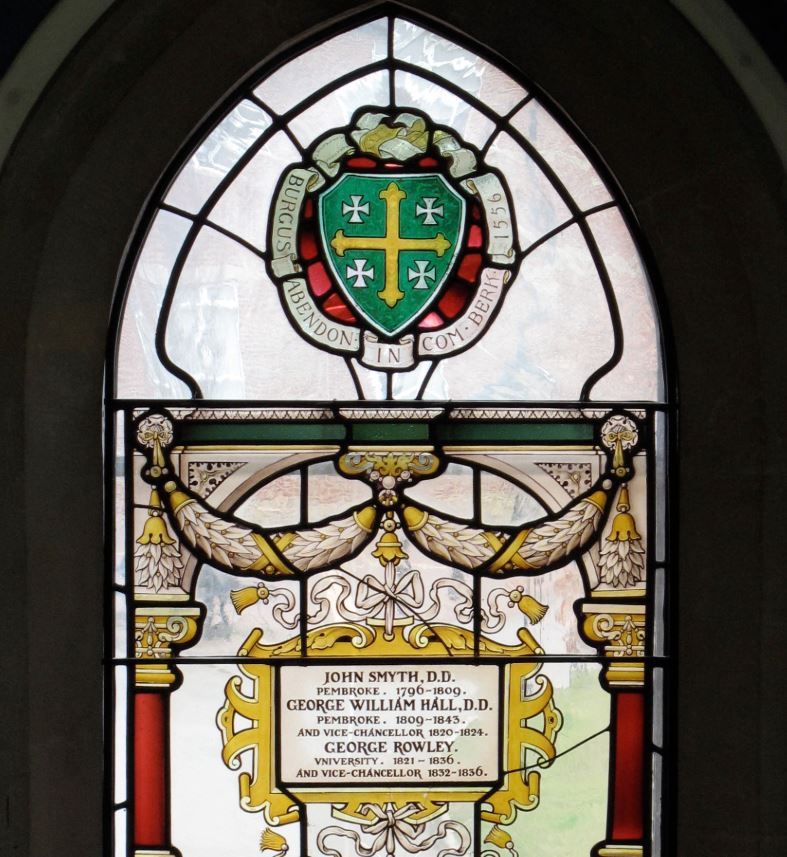
- Stained glass by Charles Eamer Kempe in the Grundy Library at Abingdon School, containing the name of George Rowley
- Born: 4 April 1782
- Died: 5 October 1836 (aged 54)

George Rowley (4 April 1782 – 5 October 1836) was Dean and Master of University College, Oxford and Vice-Chancellor of Oxford University.

== Education ==
Rowley was educated at John Roysse's Free School in Abingdon-on-Thames (now Abingdon School).

== Career ==
George Rowley was the Dean of University College in the early 19th century, at the time of Percy Bysshe Shelley's expulsion for writing the pamphlet The Necessity of Atheism in 1811. He became Master of University College from 1821 to 1836 and later Vice-Chancellor of Oxford University from 1832 to 1836. He was elected as a Fellow of the Royal Society on 14 November 1811.

== See also ==
- List of Old Abingdonians

Academic offices
Preceded by James Griffith	Master of University College, Oxford; 1821–1836	Succeeded by Frederick Charles Plumptre
Preceded by John Collier Jones	Vice-Chancellor of Oxford University; 1832–1836	Succeeded by Ashhurst Turner Gilbert
