= Thomas Wood (sculptor) =

British sculptor (1646–1695)

Thomas Wood (1646–1695) was a 17th century English sculptor based in Oxford. He is remembered as the main craftsman decorating the Ashmolean Museum and possibly also its designer.

== Life ==
Around 1658 he became apprenticed (with his brother Richard Wood) to the Oxford master mason William Bird who had several Oxford University contracts and worked closely with Christopher Wren. They both lived with the Bird family in their small tenement on the corner of Smith Street and worked in the Holywell yard, situated midway between Wadham College and New College.

He finished his apprenticeship around 1665 but still received work from Bird. He moved to the house next door.

Wood was paid £19,200 for his work on the Ashmolean, 40% of the total cost. This is the equivalent of £2.4 million in current (2020) terms. However, he did have to pay an army of masons and labourers from this sum.

He lived independently in the parish of St Peter-in-the-East, in Oxford and was logically buried there when he died in 1694/5.

== Family ==
In 1668 he married Alice Beach or Beche of Patchall at St Margaret's Church in Westminster. If this is in fact Alice Bache this would link to William Bird whose daughter married Richard Bache.

Alice and Thomas had no children and took in lodgers to supplement their income.

== Known works ==
- Memorial to John Myddelton at Brasenose College, Oxford (1671)
- Cutting and laying of the marble floor in St Mary's Church in Oxford (1675)
- Restoration and redecoration of Adam Brome's Chapel in St Mary's Church in Oxford (1676)
- Ornamentation of Cuddesdon Palace for the Bishop of Oxford (1679)
- Outer decoration of the Ashmolean Museum in Oxford (1779-1684)
- Memorial to Franciscus Junius in St George's Chapel, Windsor (1680)
- Fireplace for Lord Lovelace at Water Eaton (1693)
- Remodelling of St Mary's in Wootton (DNK)
