= James Dugdale =

Master of University College, Oxford
- In office 1558 – 17 November 1561

Archdeacon of St Albans
- In office 1557–1560

Personal details
- Occupation: Academic administrator

James Dugdale was an Oxford academic and administrator. He was Fellow and Master of University College, Oxford.

In 1547, Dugdale become a Fellow of University College. He was Master from 1558, but only for a short period, since he refused to support Queen Elizabeth I with the Oath of Supremacy. On 17 November 1561, he was summoned to appear in front of the Royal Visitors, failed to appear, and thus lost his Mastership of University College. Thomas Caius was elected Master later on the same day.

Dugdale had been collated Archdeacon of St Albans in 1557 but was deprived of the Archdeaconry in 1560 because of his Catholic sympathies and failure to sign the Oath of Supremacy.

Academic offices
| Preceded by Anthony Salveyn | Master of University College, Oxford; 1558–1561 | Succeeded by Thomas Caius |
