= Roger de Aswardby =

Master of University College, Oxford
- In office 1353-1362

Personal details
- Occupation: Academic

Roger de Aswardby MA (fl. 1353–1362) was a late 14th-century Master of University College, Oxford, England.

De Aswardby was a Fellow of University College, Oxford, and later became Master (head) of the college. He became a proctor of Oxford University in 1350 with Robert Frommund of Exeter College.

== See also ==
- Aswardby, Lincolnshire

Academic offices
Preceded by Robert de Patrington?	Master of University College, Oxford fl. 1353–1362	Succeeded by William Kexby
