= Sausthorpe =

Village in Lincolnshire

Coordinates: 53.203°N 0.070°E

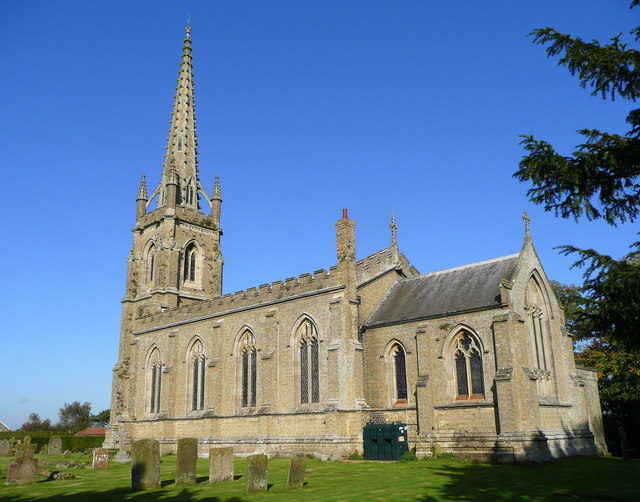
- Church of St Andrew, Sausthorpe

- Location within Lincolnshire
- Population: 305 (Including Aswardby, Dalby and Langton by Spilsby. 2011)
- OS grid reference: TF383694
  - London: 140 mi (230 km) S
- District: East Lindsey
- Shire county: Lincolnshire
- Region: East Midlands
- Country: England
- Sovereign state: United Kingdom
- Post town: Spilsby
- Postcode district: PE23
- Police: Lincolnshire
- Fire: Lincolnshire
- Ambulance: East Midlands
- UK Parliament: Louth and Horncastle

Sausthorpe is a small village and civil parish in the East Lindsey district of Lincolnshire, England, 8 miles (13 km) east of Horncastle and 3 miles (4.8 km) north-west of Spilsby. It lies on the southern edge of the Lincolnshire Wolds – a designated Area of Outstanding Natural Beauty – in the valley of the River Lymn. Farming remains the dominant economic activity in the area. The population was 305 in the 2011 census and estimated at 306 in 2019.

== Heritage ==
=== Derivation ===
The name is believed to derive from "Sauthr's thorpe", a farming settlement here in Viking times.

=== Church ===
The parish church, dedicated to St Andrew, is a Grade II listed building, designed by Charles Kirk and built in 1842 on the site of an earlier medieval church. Its construction was sponsored by Rev. Francis A. Swan, Lord of the Manor and parish rector from 1819 until his death in 1878. The spire is a prominent landmark resembling on a smaller scale that of St. James Church, Louth, 12 miles (19 km) to the north.

Pelham Dale SSC – prosecuted and imprisoned for ritualist practices in 1876 and 1880, and so regarded as a martyr by Anglo-Catholics – was the parish priest from 1881 to 1892. His grave lies under the trees on the eastern side of the churchyard. Inside the church, several Dymoke family gravestones date from the 18th century, having been transferred from the earlier church.

In 1885 Kelly's Directory recorded Rev. Charles Trollope Swan LLB as living at Sausthorpe Hall, a "modern mansion in a park of 30 acres". He had inherited the roles of Lord of the Manor and Rector from his father, Francis Swan, in 1878. He granted the rectorate, including the rectory living, residence (the Old Hall, see below) and 34 acres (0.14 km^{2}) of glebe land, to T. Pelham Dale in 1882.

=== Facilities ===
Rev. Francis A. Swan built a National School for 50 children in 1860. It survived until 1983.

The parish of Sausthorpe had a population of 206 in 30 inhabited houses in 1831.

Kelly's Directory recorded that in 1885 the area of the parish was 727 acres (2.9 km^{2}), in which were grown wheat, barley and turnips, that Sausthorpe's population at the time of the 1881 census was 141, and that within the parish were a grocer, wheelwright, carrier, two farmers, a farmer-cum-beer retailer, and a farmer-surveyor.

Sausthorpe Hall is a late 18th-century Grade II listed country house, extended and remodelled in 1822.

The Old Hall is a Grade II* listed 15th-century house, with 16th and 18th-century alterations. It has rendering over red brick and the remains of a timber frame.

Historically there were three principal farms in the village: East Farm (the farmhouse is set back from the main road about one mile east of the village); Grange Farm (the farmhouse is on the main road at the eastern entry to the village); and Church Farm (the farmhouse, now known as Linden House, is on the corner of the crossroads at the centre of the village).

=== Notable people ===
- Pelham Dale (1821–1892), an Anglo-Catholic priest prosecuted for ritualistic practices, was parish priest of Sausthorpe-cum-Aswardby from 1881 until his death. He was buried in the churchyard.
- Standish Vereker, 7th Viscount Gort (1888–1975), connoisseur and art collector, was born in Sausthorpe.

== Transport ==
Sausthorpe lies on the main A158 road between Horncastle and Skegness. It is served by the Spilsby CallConnect weekday bus service, which must be ordered by phone in advance. The nearest railway station is Skegness (13 miles; 21 km).
