= Pelham Dale =

English Anglo-Catholic Priest (1821–1892)

Thomas Pelham Dale (1821–1892) was an English Catholic ritualist priest and scientist, most notable for being prosecuted and imprisoned for ritualist practices.

In optics, the Gladstone–Dale relation is named after him and John Hall Gladstone.

== Biography ==
Thomas Pelham Dale was born at Greenwich on 3 April 1821 and grew up in Beckenham, Kent. He was the eldest son of Thomas Dale and his wife Emily Jane Richardson. After attending King's College London, in 1841 he went up to Sidney Sussex College, Cambridge and graduated in 1845. He was elected as a fellow of his college.

Dale was ordained deacon in 1845 and priest in 1846. He was appointed curate of the Camden Chapel, Camberwell, Surrey. In 1847 he became rector of St Vedast Foster Lane in the City of London.

With scholarly interests that were scientific as well as theological, Dale was librarian of Sion College in the City of London from 1851 to 1856. In science, Dale worked also with John Hall Gladstone on refraction. They published in 1863 a relation now known as the Gladstone–Dale relation.

In 1861, with Bishop Tait, Elizabeth Ferard (see 18 July in Church of England calendar) and two other women, Dale founded the North London Deaconess Institution based in King's Cross.

Originally an evangelical, Dale came to believe that ritualism was specifically appropriate to deal with the nature of secularism and forces hostile to Christianity of the time. He began to use eucharistic vestments at Christmas 1873.

Opposition to Dale crystallised around his ritualism, especially after he offered locum tenens ministry in 1875 to the congregation of St Alban the Martyr, Holborn, whilst the Revd Alexander Heriot Mackonochie was suspended for ritualist practices. In 1876 he was prosecuted under the Public Worship Regulation Act 1874. He was supported by the English Church Union in his prosecution by the Church Association. In the same year, he joined the Society of the Holy Cross. In December 1878 he recommenced all his former practices and another judgment against him from Lord Penzance in the Court of Arches was obtained in 1880. Two days later Dale was arrested and imprisoned in Holloway prison.

Dale's imprisonment drew great sympathy from all but his most die-hard opponents. Such imprisonments did more than anything else to turn public opinion against Disraeli's attempt to put down Ritualism by law.

Soon after his release Dale was presented to the living of Sausthorpe-cum-Aswardby, near Spilsby, in 1881. He died on 19 April 1892 (on the eleventh anniversary of the death of Disraeli (one of the architects of the Public Worship Regulation Act 1874) and was buried in Sausthorpe churchyard.

== Family ==
Dale married Mary Francis in 1847. Their children included:

- The Revd Thomas Francis Dale, born 1848.
- The Revd Arthur Murray Dale (1850–1927), Anglican cleric who became a Roman Catholic. He married Mary Boscawen, daughter of Evelyn Boscawen, 6th Viscount Falmouth.
- Charles Lawford Dale, born 1852, army officer
- Mary Caroline Dale, born 1854
- Helen Annette Dale, born 1856
- Emily Frances Dale, born 1859
- Clare Elizabeth Dale, born 1861
