= Thomas Chase =

Judge and cleric

Thomas Chase, or Chace (died 1449) was a 15th-century judge, scholar and cleric who was Chancellor of the University of Oxford, and subsequently held the office of Lord Chancellor of Ireland.

He was Master of Balliol College from 1412 to at least 1416, possibly until 1422, and did much to fund the new college library, donating books and money to it. He took his degree in theology from Balliol. He was Chancellor of St Paul's Cathedral from 1423 till his death.

Chase was Warden of the Hospital of St Bartholomew near Rye in 1420 and was subsequently attached to ee chapel at Jesmond near Newcastle. In politics, he was a supporter of Humphrey, the "Good Duke of Gloucester", and served as one of his chaplains; the Duke however was unable to secure a bishopric for him. He was Chancellor of the University of Oxford from 1426 until 1431, and Lord Chancellor of Ireland, at least nominally, from 1431 until 1446.

The Crown originally appointed him as Irish Chancellor in 1431. He travelled to Ireland to take up office, and presented his warrant of appointment to the Lord Deputy of Ireland, but Richard Talbot, Archbishop of Dublin, the outgoing Chancellor, refused to hand over the Great Seal of Ireland, claiming that the wording of Chase's warrant was insufficiently clear to satisfy him that he was to be dismissed. Chase, perhaps intimidated by the Archbishop's formidable personality (Talbot was not above physically assaulting his opponents), seems to have meekly returned to England, until such time as Archbishop Talbot was willing to surrender his office. In the interval he made vigorous but unsuccessful efforts to become Bishop of Meath. Talbot was eventually persuaded with great difficulty to surrender the seal, and Chase returned to Ireland with a fresh patent of appointment. Due to the more than usually turbulent political conditions in Ireland, which was wracked by the feud between the Butler and Talbot factions, Chase, who had been chosen as Chancellor explicitly because he was a neutral party in the feud, was urged on taking up office not to leave the country unless strictly necessary and, if he must travel abroad to hurry back as soon as possible. He did visit England from time to time, and it was on one such visit that he presented the petition referred to below.

Although he was described as a man of great learning, Chase, unlike most clerics who held high government office at the time, never became a bishop, despite his strenuous efforts to become Bishop of Meath in 1436. He held several benefices, including canonries at York and Cashel, and spent his last years as parson of High Ongar in Essex, where he died in 1449.

As Lord Chancellor, he is mainly remembered for his petition to the Privy Council that Irish law students seeking admission to the Inns of Court in London should receive equal treatment with their English colleagues, to which the Council returned "a full and effectual response under the Privy Seal of England".

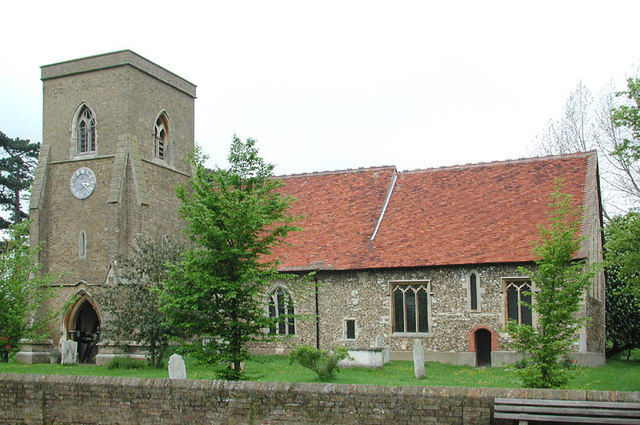
St Mary, High Ongar- Chace spent his last years as vicar here.

Academic offices
Preceded by John Castell	Chancellor of the University of Oxford; 1426–1431	Succeeded by Gilbert Kymer
Government offices
Preceded by Richard Talbot	Lord Chancellor of Ireland; 1441–1446	Succeeded by Richard Wogan
