= James Griffith (academic) =

British theologian

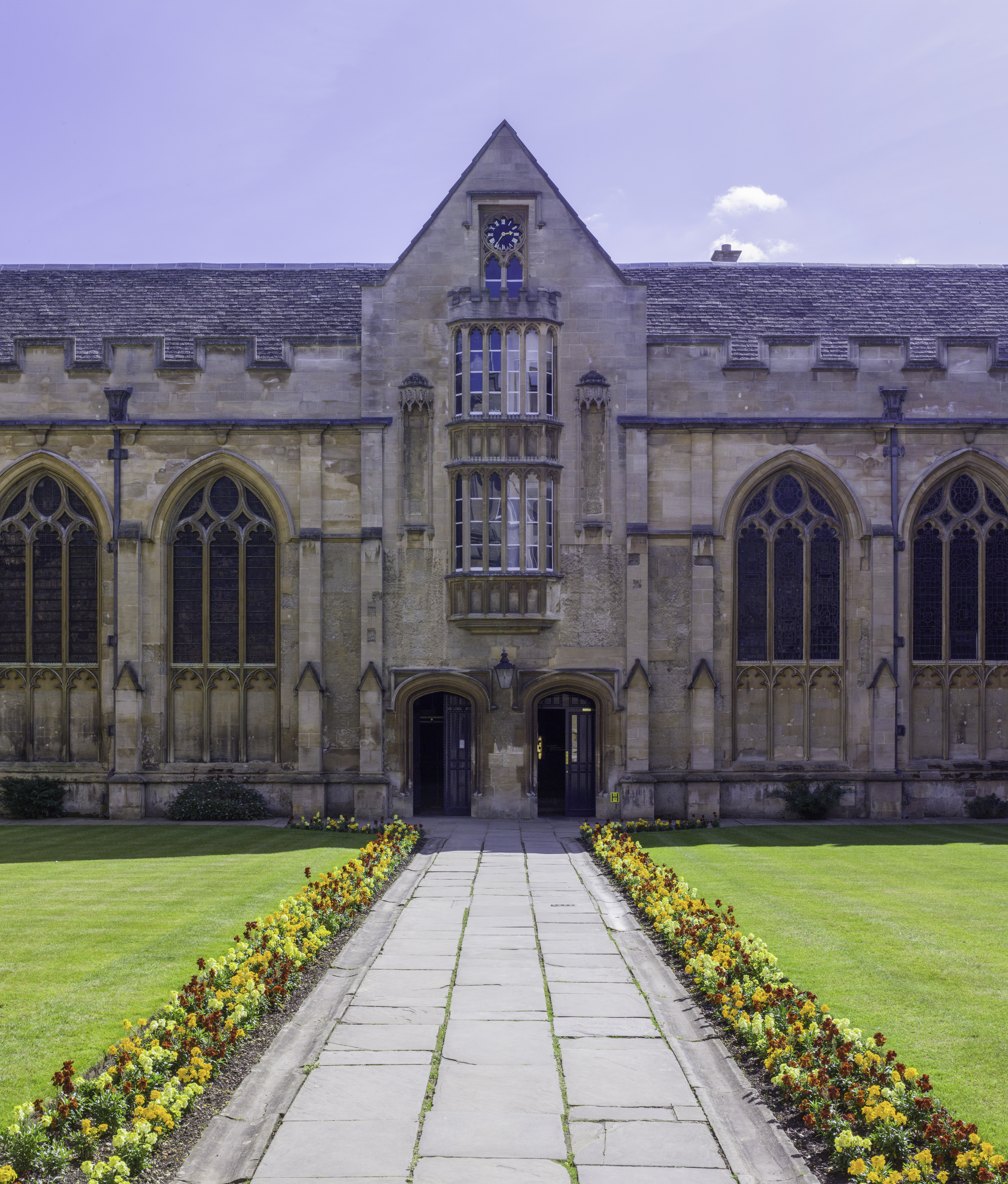
View of the south side of the main quadrangle at University College, Oxford, for which James Griffith was responsible when it was refaced in 1802.

James Griffith (1761–1821) was an Oxford academic and administrator. He was elected as a Fellow of University College, Oxford in 1784. From 22 January 1808, he was Master of the College until his death in 1821.

James Griffith was Master of Univ when Percy Bysshe Shelley was expelled as an undergraduate after writing a provocative pamphlet on The Necessity of Atheism in 1811. Shelley was called in to see Griffith and a number of college fellows on 25 March 1811. When Griffith asked Shelley if the pamphlet was his, Shelley remained silent. Shelley's friend, Thomas Jefferson Hogg, also appeared to support him, claiming equal culpability. Later that day, a notice appeared on the Hall door, signed by Griffith and the Dean, George Rowley (who succeeded Griffith as Master of the college), stating that Shelley and Hogg were expelled from the college.

Griffith was interested in art and architecture. He was responsible for the south side of the main quadrangle at University College when it was refaced in 1802, including the dining hall and chapel. In 1811, he designed the vestry for the church in Melsonby. In 1819, he was a member of a Delegacy advising on the development of the site Hertford College as a replacement for Magdalen Hall. There is a water colour painting by him of the Vale of Conway in the Victoria & Albert Museum, London.

He was a prebendary at Gloucester from 1816. At Gloucester Cathedral, he designed the Gothic choir screen, erected in 1820.

Griffith married his cousin, Mary Ironside, on his election to Master of University College. They lived together in the Master's Lodgings.

Academic offices
Preceded by Nathan Wetherell	Master of University College, Oxford; 1808–1821	Succeeded by George Rowley
