= John Martyn (academic) =

Master of University College, Oxford

John Martyn (died 1473), also known as John Marten, was a Master of University College, Oxford, England.

Martyn was a Fellow at University College from 1427. As the Senior Fellow of the College, he became Master in 1441, a post he held until his death in 1473. This was a long time (32 years), especially for the period. It is probably the longest period at any Oxford college before 1500. During his time as Master, University College attained its first quadrangle or "quad".

Academic offices
Preceded by Thomas Benwell	Master of University College, Oxford; 1441–1473	Succeeded by William Gregford
