= Francis Newbolt =

British barrister, judge, etcher and writer (1863–1940)

Sir Francis George Newbolt
- Born: 22 November 1863
- Died: 7 December 1940 (aged 77)
- Other names: Frank Newbolt, Bradnock Hall
- Occupations: Barrister; Judge
- Known for: Law, etching

Sir Francis George Newbolt KC FCS (21 November 1863 – 5 December 1940) was a British barrister, judge, etcher and writer. He was the Recorder of Doncaster between 1916 and 1920, and the Official Referee for the Supreme Court between 1920 and 1936, as well as being Chancellor of the Diocese of Exeter and Bradford and Chairman of the Devon Quarter Session. He was the first honorary Professor of Law at the Royal Academy of Arts.

== Early life ==
Newbolt was born in Bilston, Wolverhampton, son of the vicar of St Mary's Church, the Rev. Henry Francis Newbolt (1824–1866), and his second wife, Emily née Stubbs (1838–1921). He was the younger brother to poet Sir Henry Newbolt. He was educated at Clifton College, and later at Balliol College, Oxford where he read Natural Science (Chemistry) obtaining honours in 1887.

== Legal career ==
Newbolt went on to read law with Sir Thomas Chitty, 1st Baronet, his brother-in-law. He was invited to join the Bar at Inner Temple in 1890 before taking silk in 1914. One of his first cases was representing the plaintiff, John William Phillips, landlord of Hoy and Helmet, South Benfleet against the Marquis of Queensberry in the High Court. During the First World War he was an honorary legal advisor to the British government. In 1916 he was appointed the Recorder of Doncaster, a position he held until 1920. In 1919 he was elected Chairman of the Devon Quarter Session. In 1920 he was made the Official Referee for the Supreme Court by the Lord Chancellor F. E. Smith, 1st Earl of Birkenhead. In 1923, Newbolt recommended that medical evidence should be used in paternity cases due to the issue of perjury. He stated that a defendant

rarely shows any hesitation about committing perjury

and that

a doctor's report, if not in his favour, might deter him from swearing to the contrary

His recommendations were not taken forward at the time due to the limitations in medical science. However, Newbolt's innovation in micro caseflow management, now called Newbolt's Scheme, was at first rejected by the Lord Chancellor Birkenhead, before being seen more favourably by Lord Birkenhead's successor and continued by Newbolt's successors as Official Referee. Newbolt described the system,

The true fashion of the courts is ... not to conciliate or exhort the parties, much less to hurry them ... but to use the available machinery of litigation to enable them to settle their disputes according to law without grievous waste and unnecessary delay

Newbolt retired from the post in 1936. In 1939, Newbolt represented Jacob Epstein at a military tribune as part of T. E. Hulme's campaign to stop him being called up.

== The artist ==
Newbolt was a talented engraver. He was a regular exhibitor at the Royal Society of Painter-Etchers and Engravers, which he was an associate member and the society's historian, and various major art exhibitions. Newbolt regularly displayed his etchings at the Royal Academy of Art. His work exhibited included The Funeral in 1921, Barton Broad in 1923, Taormina in 1929 and Treworan Bridge in 1930. Newbolt was elected as a member of the Art Workers' Guild in 1907. The British Museum hold 36 of Newbolt's etchings.

== The writer ==
Newbolt was the first editor of the journal of the Land Agent's Society. Newbolt started writing under a pseudonym Bradnock Hall, with a novel Rough Mischance in 1896 and Fish Tales and Some True Ones in 1897.

Newbolt first book under his own name was released in 1897. The Sale of Goods Act 1893 was a review of the act and its use in law. He released the book Clifton College Twenty-Five Years Ago: The Diary of a Fag in 1904 and Clifton College Forty Years Ago in 1927 under the pseudonym Diary of a Praepostor. His next books were essays on the history of etchings, with Etchings of Van Dyck released in 1906, Etchings of William Strang, A.R.A. in 1907 and Catalogue Dressé in 1908, a catalogue of Frank Brangwyn's engraved work. He would go onto provide articles for publications on etchers, including The Etchings of E.M. Synge A.R.E. in 1914 and Etchings of Fred V.Burridge in 1908 for The Studio. Under Bradnock Hall he released the 1910 book Norwegian and Other Fish-Tales which included his own illustrations. His book Summary Procedure in the High Court was released in 1914. In 1915, he worked with his brother Sir Henry John Newbolt on the book The King's Highway.

In 1925 he wrote Out of Court where he attacked Anthony Trollope and his novel Orley Farm for his inaccuracies in the procedure of law. The book had come out of his lecture in 1923 at Grays Inn. His writings were challenged by American lawyer Henry Drinker, but he did not respond. Newbolt contributed articles to the Art Journal, to the Law Quarterly Review, and The Listener. In 1926 he released a book of his poetry along with a collection of his etchings called The Enchanted Wood. In 1930 he released The History of the Royal Society of Painter-Etchers & Engravers, 1880-1940, the official history at the time.

== Other career areas ==
In 1910 Newbolt stood for the Liberal Party in the parliamentary constituency of Chertsey. Newbolt continued his love of science, delivering over 1000 lectures to school children. Newbolt was Chancellor of the Diocese of Exeter and Bradford. In 1921, The Church Times criticised Newbolt's decision on a crucifix case.

== Honours ==
Newbolt was elected as a fellow of the Chemical Society in 1895. In 1919, Newbolt was made an honorary member of the Land Agent's Society, and was made a Knight of the Realm for his voluntary work as a legal advisor during the First World War. He was the president of the Norwegian Society from 1920 to 1926. Newbolt was elected as the Master of the Art Workers' Guild in 1927. The Royal Academy of Arts made Newbolt the first Honorary Professor of Law in 1928. In 1932 he was made the Master of the Worshipful Company of Clockmakers, where he had previously been deputy master.

== Personal life and death ==
Newbolt was a keen salmon and trout fisherman. He married Alice Clara Franck Bright, daughter of James Franck Bright, in 1889; and they had four daughters. They lived in Aylesbeare in Devon. Lady Newbolt died in 1934 at the age of 67 leaving Newbolt a widower. Newbolt himself died on 7 December 1940.
