= John Bancroft (bishop) =

Bishop of Oxford

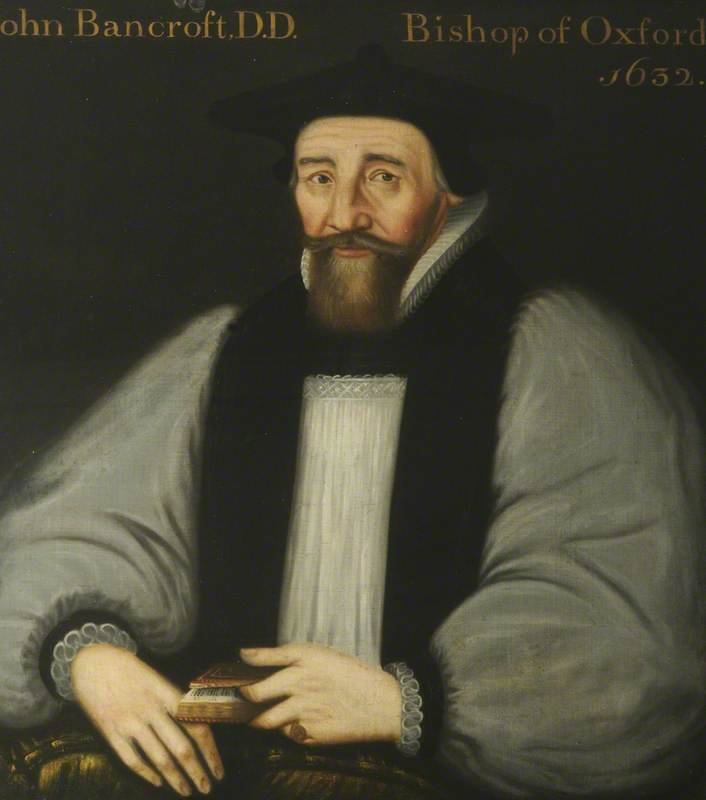
John Bancroft, Bishop of Oxford

John Bancroft (1574 – 12 February 1640/41) was an English clergyman and academic, who served as Bishop of Oxford and Master of University College, Oxford.

John Bancroft was the son of Christopher Bancroft and the nephew of Richard Bancroft, Archbishop of Canterbury. He was educated at Westminster School and Christ Church, Oxford, graduating B.A. 1596, M.A. 1599, B.D. 1607, D.D. 1609/10.

In the church, Bancroft held the following livings:

- Rector of Finchley, Middlesex (1601)
- Rector of Stourmouth and Orpington, Kent (1608)
- Rector of Woodchurch, Kent (1609)
- Rector of Biddenden, Kent (1610)
- Canon of St Paul's Cathedral (1609)
- Bishop of Oxford (1632–1641)
- Vicar of Cuddesdon, Oxfordshire (1633)
- Vicar of Bray, Berkshire (1633)

Bancroft's uncle appointed him to Finchley (as Bishop of London) and to his livings in Kent (as Archbishop of Canterbury from 1604). He was elected Master of University College in March 1610. The Front Quad of the college was rebuilt in stages from 1610, replacing the original medieval buildings, only to be completed much later in 1677. In 1632, he relinquished his position as Master of University College and became Bishop of Oxford.

Bancroft had high church views, and was a friend of Archbishop William Laud. The Puritan William Prynne (in an attack on Laud) wrote that Bancroft was a "corrupt, unpreaching, popish prelate".

Bancroft's administrative ingenuity is demonstrated by the manor in which he created Cuddesdon Palace as the bishop's palace. As the vicarage of All Saints, Cuddesdon was vacant, and the Bishop of Oxford made the appointment, Bancroft appointed himself to Cuddesdon soon after becoming bishop. He secured a royal warrant to annex the vicarage to the bishopric permanently, also secured a grant of timber from the royal forest of Shotover and an annual 100-shilling rent-charge against the royal forests, and was thus able to build Cuddesdon Palace.

Academic offices
Preceded by George Abbot	Master of University College, Oxford; 1610–1632	Succeeded by Thomas Walker
Church of England titles
Preceded by Richard Corbet	Bishop of Oxford; 1632–1641	Succeeded by Robert Skinner
