= Reginald Walter Macan =

Irish classical scholar (1848–1941)

- Portrait by Walter Stoneman, 1921
- Born: 1848; Ireland
- Died: 23 March 1941; Oxford, England
- Occupations: Classical scholar; Master of University College, Oxford
- Known for: Books on Herodotus
- Spouse: Mildred Healey (1881)
- Children: Three daughters, including Agatha Perrin

Academic background
- Education: University College, Oxford

Academic work
- Discipline: Classics
- Institutions: Christ Church, Oxford; University College, Oxford

Reginald Walter Macan (1848 – 23 March 1941) was an Irish classical scholar. He was educated at University College, Oxford, where he gained a First in Classical Moderations in 1869 and a First in Literae Humaniores ('Greats') in 1871. He held a Fellowship at the college (1884–1906) and was appointed Master in March 1906. He was only the second layman Master of the college after Anthony Gate, Master from 1584 to 1597.

Reginald Macan was originally from Dublin, Ireland, and retained his Irish accent until the 1890s. He was an undergraduate at University College, Oxford, and then a "Student" (the equivalent of a Fellow) of Christ Church after obtaining his degree. He returned to University College as a Fellow and Tutor in 1884 until becoming Master of the college in 1906. He retired in 1923.

Macan had a reputation as a heretic early in his career, but delivered addresses in the chapel at University College at least annually. Like his predecessor as Master, J. Frank Bright, he was nicknamed the "Mugger" by students.

Macan applied archaeological discoveries to the study of ancient history. He produced a major set of books on Herodotus.

In 1913, Reginald Macan visited New York and spoke at the Sphinx Club about Rhodes Scholars at Oxford University.

In 1881, Macan married Mildred Healey; they had three daughters, one of whom Agatha Perrin married Eric Forbes Adam. He retired to Boars Hill, south of Oxford, and lived there till the age of 93.

Maurice Greiffenhagen painted a formal portrait of Macan in academic dress, located at University College in Oxford.

Academic offices
Preceded by James Franck Bright	Master of University College, Oxford; 1906–1923	Succeeded by Michael Ernest Sadler
