= Cuddesdon Palace =

Former bishop's palace

Coordinates: 51.724°N 1.132°W

Cuddesdon Palace was the bishop's palace for the diocese of Oxford, located near the village of Cuddesdon, Oxfordshire, England.

== History ==
Cuddesdon Palace was completed by 1634 for John Bancroft, who was Bishop of Oxford from 1632 until 1641. In 1644 during the English Civil War Royalist forces burned the palace to render it unusable by the Parliamentarian forces besieging Oxford. In 1676 John Fell was made Bishop of Oxford and in 1679 he commissioned the complete rebuilding of the palace. This was under the control of a builder named Richard Frogley who subcontracted the sculptor Thomas Wood of Oxford for the ornamentation.

In 1846 Bishop Samuel Wilberforce had the chapel of Saints Peter and Paul added to the Palace. It was designed by the Gothic Revival architect Benjamin Ferrey. In 1854, Wilberforce opened Ripon College Cuddesdon opposite the palace.

Successive bishops of Oxford resided at the palace until Thomas Banks Strong retired in 1937. For the duration of the Second World War Queen Anne's Bounty was evacuated from London and occupied the palace. Thereafter, The Society of the Salutation of Mary the Virgin occupied the palace from 1946 until 1949. In the 1960s the palace was in private use for a few years, but it burnt down before the end of that decade. The bishop's chapel escaped the fire and survives in the grounds of the house that replaced the palace.

The Bishop of Oxford now resides in North Oxford.
