= Anthony Gate =

Anthony Gate was an Oxford academic and administrator. He was Fellow and Master of University College, Oxford.

At Oxford University, Gate took his MA degree in 1572 and his B.Med. (his highest degree, in medicine) in 1580. He was the first layman to be elected Master of University College. He took office on 15 September 1584, after William James resigned to become Dean of Christ Church. There would not be another layman as Master of the College until Reginald Walter Macan in 1906, so this was an unusual choice for the time.

Gate was married to Judith. They lived in the Lodgings and his four sons (Peter, Nathaniel, Timothy, and Thomas) all attended University College for their education.

Academic offices
Preceded by William James	Master of University College, Oxford; 1584–1597	Succeeded by George Abbot
