= Aswardby =

Village in Lincolnshire, England

Coordinates: 53.2126°N 0.06163°E

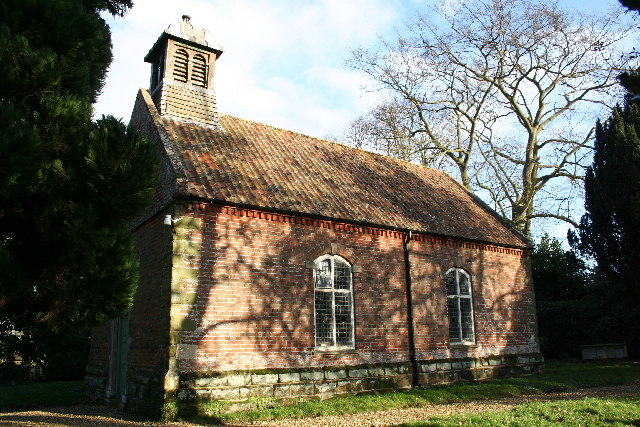
- Church of St Helen, Aswardby

- Location within Lincolnshire
- OS grid reference: TF377703
  - London: 115 mi (185 km) S
- District: East Lindsey
- Shire county: Lincolnshire
- Region: East Midlands
- Country: England
- Sovereign state: United Kingdom
- Post town: Spilsby
- Postcode district: PE23
- Police: Lincolnshire
- Fire: Lincolnshire
- Ambulance: East Midlands
- UK Parliament: Louth and Horncastle

Aswardby (pronounced "as-ard-bee") is a village situated 4 miles (6 km) north-west from Spilsby, in the East Lindsey district of Lincolnshire, England.

== Geography ==
It lies north of the A158 and west of the A16 roads. It is in the civil parish of Sausthorpe.

Aswardby should not be confused with Aswarby, which is also in Lincolnshire, but about 35 miles (56 km) south-west of Aswardby.

== History ==
Fr T. Pelham Dale, SSC, prosecuted and imprisoned for Ritualist practices in 1876 and 1880, and regarded a martyr by Anglo-Catholics, was the parish priest from 1881 to 1892.

Aswardby Hall was built approximately 1845, with further building works completed around 1910.

=== World War II ===
A Luftwaffe squadron 'Küstenfliegergruppe 106' at Dinard–Pleurtuit, now Dinard–Pleurtuit–Saint-Malo Airport planned to bomb a De Havilland Propellers plant at Lostock in Lancashire, but bombed north-west Derbyshire and machine-gunned Chatsworth House, instead. The Luftwaffe squadron had taken off from Lanvéoc-Poulmic, which is now the Lanvéoc-Poulmic Naval Air Base.

On the south-eastern return leg of the journey in early July 1942 at 8.20pm, the two Ju 88 aircraft were attacked by Spitfires of 303 Sqn of RAF Kirton in Lindsey. Ju 88 'M2-KK' was hit by Tadeusz Kolecki and Aleksandrr Rokitnicki, and crash landed at 8.30pm, towards Harrington, Lincolnshire. The Germans spoke excellent English, were smartly dressed, and said 'your Spitfires are too good for us'. The Germans liked the local scenery as well, and were taken to Skegness. The other Ju 88 crashed at Baumber, but all four Germans were killed.

== See also ==
- Roger de Aswardby, 14th-century Master of University College, Oxford
