= William Mollison (mathematician) =

Scottish mathematician and academic (1851–1929)

38th Master of Clare College, Cambridge
- In office March 1915 – March 1929
- Preceded by: Edward Atkinson
- Succeeded by: Godfrey Wilson

Personal details
- Born: 19 September 1851 Aberdeen, Scotland
- Died: 10 March 1929 (aged 77) London, England
- Resting place: Ascension Parish Burial Ground, Cambridge
- Spouse: Ellen Mayhew
- Children: Three
- Education: Aberdeen Grammar School
- Alma mater: University of Aberdeen; Clare College, Cambridge

William Loudon Mollison (19 September 1851 – 10 March 1929) was a Scottish mathematician and academic. From 1915 to 1929, he was Master of Clare College, Cambridge.

== Early life and education ==
Mollison was born on 19 September 1851 in Aberdeen, Scotland. He was educated at Aberdeen Grammar School, then an all-boys grammar school. He studied mathematics and natural philosophy at the University of Aberdeen, graduating in 1872 with a first class degree. That year, he was awarded the Ferguson Scholarship by Aberdeen and matriculated into Clare College, Cambridge to continue his mathematical studies. He became a Foundation Scholar in 1873. His private tutor while at Cambridge was Edward Routh. He graduated from the University of Cambridge in 1876 as the Second Wrangler.

== Career ==
On 29 April 1876, Mollison was elected a Fellow of Clare College, Cambridge. He was an examiner for the University of St Andrews between 1876 and 1880. He was a mathematics lecturer at Jesus College, Cambridge from 1877 to 1882, and at Clare College from 1882. In addition to his college teaching, he was a private tutor or "coach" in mathematics.

Due to ill health, he moved from teaching a large number of students, privately and through his college, into administration. He was appointed junior tutor of Clare College in 1880, and was made its senior tutor in May 1894. He was elected a member of the Council of the Senate of the University Of Cambridge in 1892, and appointed Secretary of the General Board of Studies of the University in 1904: he stepped down from both these posts in 1920. He served as locum tenens for the then Master (Edward Atkinson) from 1913 to 1915. Mollison was unanimously elected as Atkinson successor as the 38th Master of Clare College, Cambridge in March 1915.

== Personal life ==
Mollison was married to Ellen Mayhew. They had one son and two daughters, one of whom pre-deceased him. His wife died in 1917, and he provided the endowment for the Mayhew Prize, a mathematics prize awarded by the University of Cambridge, in her honour. His son, William Mayhew Mollison, was a distinguished ear, nose and throat surgeon, and his son Patrick Mollison, a noted haematologist.

Mollison died on 10 March 1929 in London, England; he was aged 77. His funeral was held at the chapel of Clare College, Cambridge, and he was buried in the Ascension Parish Burial Ground alongside his wife.
