= Robin Matthews (economist) =

British economist (1927-2010)

Robert Charles Oliver "Robin" Matthews (16 June 1927 – 19 June 2010) was an economist and chess problemist.

Matthews was born in Edinburgh. He was educated at Edinburgh Academy and Corpus Christi College, Oxford, and was a Fellow of All Souls College, Oxford. He was the Drummond Professor of Political Economy at Oxford from 1965 to 1975 and the Professor of Political Economy at Cambridge from 1980 to 1991. He was also the Master of Clare College, Cambridge from 1975 to 1993.

As a chess problemist he specialised in the composition of directmate three-movers, a field in which he was recognised as one of the world's leading exponents.

Matthews wrote many books on economics, among which:

- The Trade Cycle, Cambridge University Press, 1960
- A Study in Trade-Cycle History: Economic Fluctuations in Great Britain 1833-1842, 1954
- Economic Growth and Resources, Palgrave Macmillan, 1980
- Economic Growth and Resources: Volume 2, Trends and Factors, Palgrave Macmillan, 1980
- British Economic Growth 1856-1973 (with C. H. Feinstein and J. Odling-Smee), Clarendon Press, 1982

He also wrote two books on chess problems:

- Chess Problems: Introduction to an art (with M. Lipton and J. M. Rice), 1963
- Mostly Three-Movers: Collected Chess Problems 1939-1993, Feenschach-Phénix, Aachen, 1995

Academic offices
Preceded by Eric Ashby	Master of Clare College, Cambridge; 1975–1993	Succeeded by Bob Hepple
