= Thomas Duffield (academic) =

Thomas Duffield was a Master of University College, Oxford, England. Duffield became Master of the College in 1396 and remained in the post until 1398.

Academic offices
Preceded by Thomas Foston	Master of University College, Oxford; 1396–1398	Succeeded by Edmund Lacy
