= John Appleton (academic) =

Master of University College, Oxford

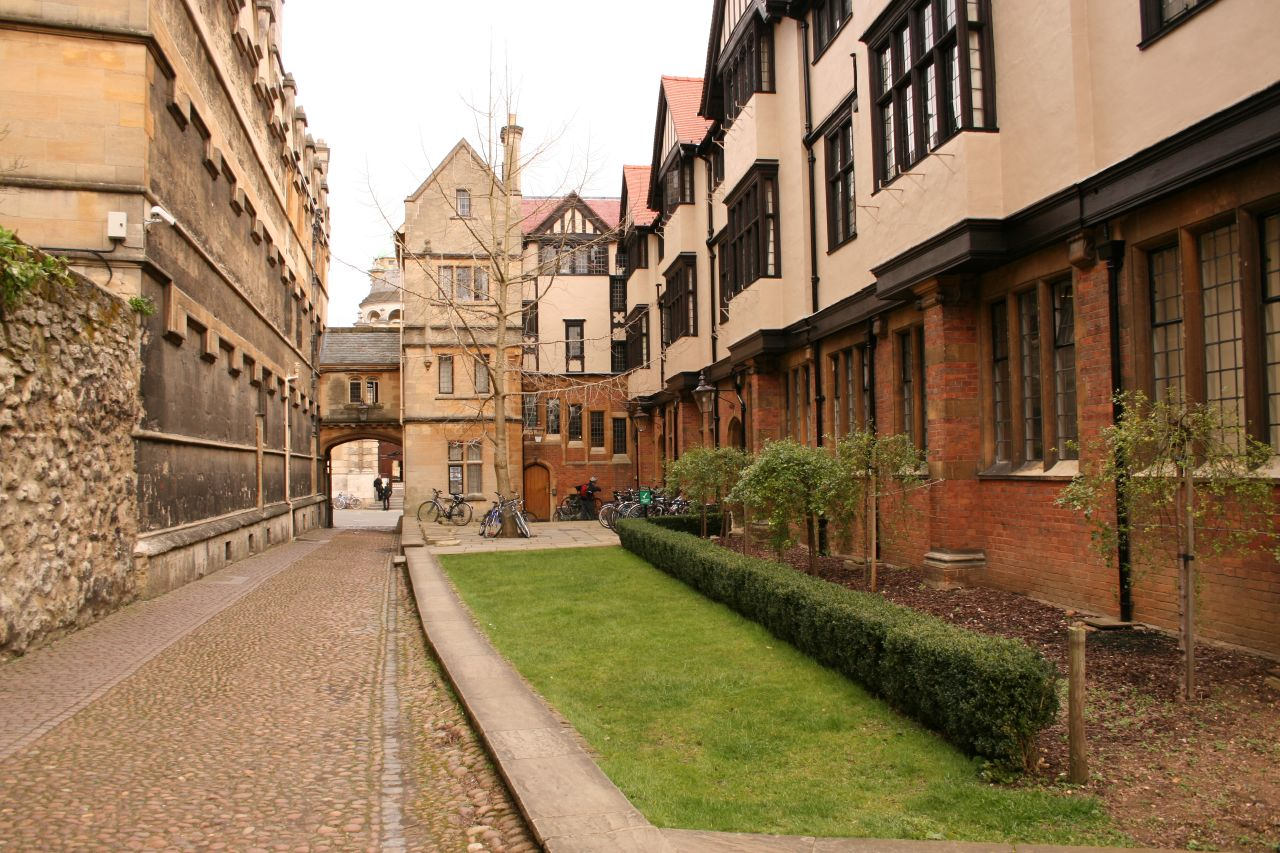
Logic Lane, developed under John Appleton's mastership at University College.

John Appleton (a.k.a. John de Appleton) was a Master of University College, Oxford, England.

Appleton was a mature commoner and Fellow of University College. He became Master of the College circa 1401 and remained in the post until about 1408. At the end of 1403, King Henry IV gave the College the manor of Marks Hall, located near Margaret Roding, one of The Rodings villages in Essex, through the efforts of Appleton's friend Walter Skirlaw, the Bishop of Durham. This supported three new Fellows at the College. The College prospered and developed under Appleton's mastership, especially in the area around Logic Lane (formerly Horseman Lane) off the High Street, to the east of the main part of the College.

Appleton later received a special Fellowship at the College in 1438.

Academic offices
Preceded by Edmund Lacy	Master of University College, Oxford c.1401–c.1408	Succeeded by John Castell
