= Kexby, Lincolnshire =

Village in Lincolnshire, England

Coordinates: 53.3621°N 0.6885°W

Kexby
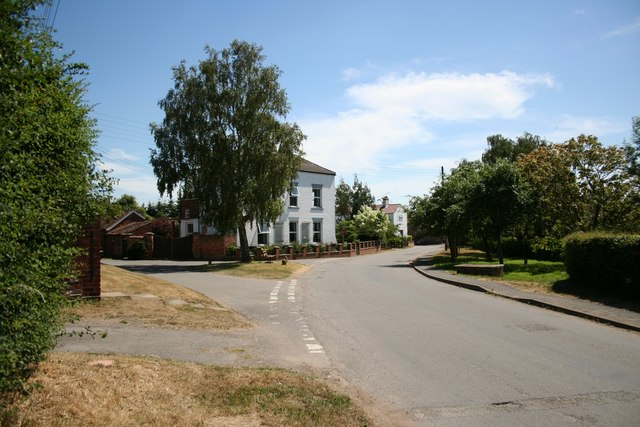
- Kexby

- Location within Lincolnshire
- Population: 340 (2001)
- OS grid reference: SK871857
  - London: 130 mi (210 km) S
- District: West Lindsey
- Shire county: Lincolnshire
- Region: East Midlands
- Country: England
- Sovereign state: United Kingdom
- Post town: Gainsborough
- Postcode district: DN21
- Police: Lincolnshire
- Fire: Lincolnshire
- Ambulance: East Midlands
- UK Parliament: Gainsborough

Kexby is a small village and civil parish in the West Lindsey district of Lincolnshire, England. The population of the civil parish at the 2011 census was 340. It lies at the side of the B1241 road, and is situated 4 miles (6 km) south-east of Gainsborough and 11 miles (18 km) north-west of the city and county town of Lincoln.

== History ==
The earliest records for the village of Kexby can be found in the Domesday Book, which dates back to 1086. According to these reports, the village went by the name of Cheftesbi/Chestesbi. These records also highlight that Kexby was home to 21 households which was considered to be a relatively large number at this time. This point is backed up by the fact that in 1086, Kexby was the third largest settlement in the hundred of Well. This was out of the 15 settlements in the area.

Although Kexby is a separate village and parish council, it is served by the church in the neighbouring village and parish council of Upton. The local ecclesiastical parish is Upton with Kexby in the Diocese of Lincoln. The church register in Upton, which include reports for Kexby, dates back to 1563. However, there is evidence that the Church of All Saints dates back much further, with parts of the chancel walls believed to date back to before the Norman Conquest of 1066.

In the 1870s, the village of Kexby was described as:

"a township in Upton parish, Lincoln; 3 miles N of Marton r. station, and 5 SE of Gainsborough. Acres, 1, 540. Real property, £2, 215. Pop., 272. Houses, 61. The manor belongs to W. Hutton, Esq. There are chapels for Primitive Methodists and U. Free Methodists."

The parish boundaries have not changed in Kexby since the 19th century. The parish forms a long horizontal shape, stretching from Heaton's Wood in the East to Kexby Grange in the West. However, in the earlier reference from the 1870s, Kexby was described as being "a township in Upton parish"; as of today, this is not correct. In 1894, the government passed an act concerning parishes, creating 14,000 of them. We can only presume that this was when Kexby became independent from Upton parish.

Occupational statistics are available for Kexby in 1881. For men, the dominant employer was agriculture, with 53 working in this sector, over 60% of the male population at the time. These statistics also show that 9 women were employed as indoor domestic servants, possibly at the manor house owned by W.Hutton, highlighting the unequal nature of the workplace in the Victorian period. For a small village, Kexby was well supplied, as the occupational statistics state that the village was home to a bakery, a butchers and a grocery store.

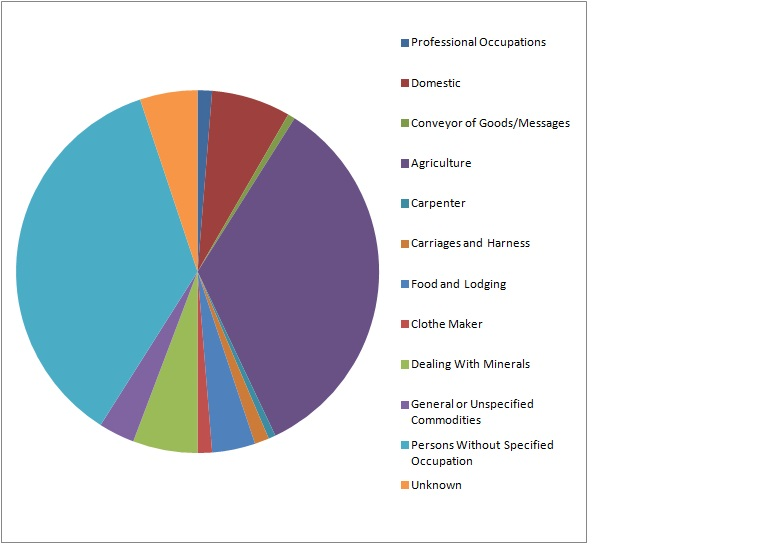
Occupational Statistics for Kexby Civil Parish, as reported in the 1881 Census.

== Present day ==
As of 2011, the occupational status of many of Kexby's population has changed. The census report of 2011 highlights this shift. The most popular form of employment for Kexby now is in the professional trade, with 31 people working in this sector, 17% of the villages population. 28 people also work as Managers, Directors and Senior Officials, with 29 involved in the Skilled Trade sector. These statistics go to show how much the workplace has changed over the past 130 years since the 1881 census. Now, only 15 residents of Kexby work in Elementary Occupations, such as farming.

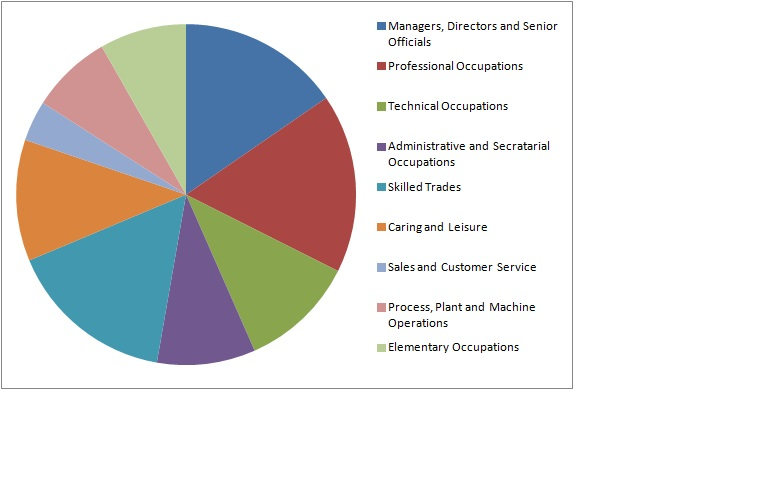
Occupational Statistics for Kexby Civil Parish, as reported in the 2011 Census

Kexby itself does not contain any schools. However, there are primary schools located in the nearby villages of Marton, Lea and Sturton-by-Stow. After primary education, the pupils of Kexby can attend schools such as the Queen Elizabeth's High School in Gainsborough, which also offers the chance for students to stay on at sixth form level.

In terms of transport, buses between Gainsborough and Lincoln stop at Kexby Corner bus stop roughly every hour. The nearest railway station is at Gainsborough Lea Road, which can be found 3 miles north west of the village, on the Gainsborough to Lincoln line.

== Population ==
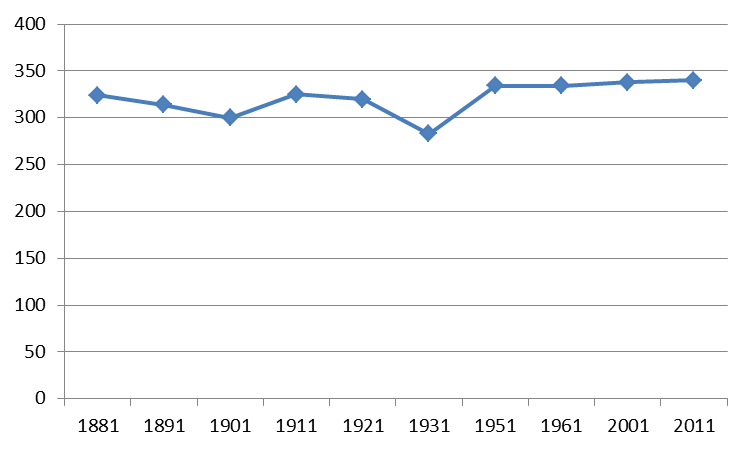
Total Population of Kexby Civil Parish, Lincolnshire, as reported by the Census of Population from 1881 to 2011.

Since 1881, the population of Kexby has remained relatively steady, never exceeding a total of 350. Unlike a majority of villages in the UK, Kexby seems to be unaffected by the events of World War 1. The population only decreased by 5 between 1911 and 1921, from 325 to 320. As of 2011, the total population of Kexby is 340. The age range in the population of Kexby is quite diverse; the census data for 2011 highlights this. The most populous age ranges seems to be from 40 to 49 and 60–69, but for a village like Kexby there also seems to be a healthy proportion of other younger and older generations.

== Amenities and landmarks ==
Kexby contains a 4-star Bed and Breakfast business and a picture framing business.

The course of the River Trent, one of England's longest rivers, passes approximately 2.5 miles (4 km) west of Kexby on its way to the Humber Estuary where it enters the North Sea.
