= Thomas Foston =

Thomas Foston was a Master of University College, Oxford, England.

Foston was a mature commoner and Fellow of University College. As senior Fellow of the College, he became Master in 1393, ratified by the Chancellor of Oxford University for two years, and remained in the post until 1396.

Academic offices
Preceded by William Kexby	Master of University College, Oxford; 1393–1396	Succeeded by Thomas Duffield
