= William Smith (Master of Clare College, Cambridge) =

English academic (1556–1615)

William Smith, D.D. (1556–1615) was an English academic.

Smith was born in Princes Risborough and educated at Eton College. He entered King's College, Cambridge in 1573, graduating B.A in 1578 and M.A in 1581. He was Fellow of Kings from 1576 to 1586. Smith was ordained a priest in the Church of England and was Chaplain to Queen Elizabeth then King James. He held incumbencies at Kingston, Halstead, Barfield and Willingham. He was Master of Clare Hall, Cambridge from 1598 until 1612; Vice-Chancellor of the University of Cambridge during 1602; and Provost of King's College, Cambridge from 1612 until his death on 26 March 1615.
