= Thomas Caius =

Master of University College, Oxford

Thomas Caius (aka Thomas Key, died in Oxford, May 1572) was an Oxford academic and administrator. He was Fellow and Master of University College, Oxford.

Caius was Registrar of the University of Oxford from 1535 to 1552. He was rejected as Master of University College in 1552, but was elected in 1561. In 1560, he was appointed a prebendary of Salisbury Cathedral. In 1563, he became Rector of Tredington in Worcestershire.

Thomas Caius was interested in the history of Oxford. He wrote a treatise entitled An Assertion of the Antiquity of Oxford University, strengthening the claim that King Alfred founded University College in particular and Oxford University in general. This was prompted by a visit of Queen Elizabeth I to Cambridge in 1564, when she heard speeches on the age of the University there. In 1568, John Caius (no relation of Thomas), the refounder and Master of Gonville and Caius College, Cambridge, wrote a long rebuttal entitled On the Antiquity of the University of Cambridge.

Academic offices
Preceded by James Dugdale	Master of University College, Oxford; 1561–1572	Succeeded by William James
