= John Castell =

15th-century English academic

Chancellor of the University of Oxford
- In office 1421–1426
- Preceded by: Walter Treugof
- Succeeded by: Thomas Chase

King's Clerk
- In office 1420
- Preceded by: John Stone
- Succeeded by: William Alnwick

Master of University College
- In office c. 1408 – 1420
- Preceded by: John Appleton
- Succeeded by: Robert Burton

Personal details
- Born: c. 1380
- Died: 1426 (age about 46)

John Castell, also spelled John Castle, (c. 1380 – 1426) was a Master of University College, Oxford, and later Chancellor of the University of Oxford.

Castell was a Fellow of University College. He became Master of the College circa 1408. He also held preferment in the Diocese of York with his mastership. In 1411, a sentence of excommunication was issued by the Archbishop of Canterbury, Thomas Arundel, against Castell, Fellows at the College — Robert Burton (later Master of the College), John Hamerton, and Adam Redyford — and the College as a whole, due to Lollardy leanings. An appeal to the Pope against the excommunication was made by the bursar of the College, John Ryvell. Castell survived the controversy and continued as Master until 1420.

John Castell was appointed a King's Clerk in 1420. In 1421, he became Chancellor of Oxford University, a position he held until 1426.

== See also ==
- Secretary of State (England)
- Master of University College, Oxford
- Chancellor of Oxford University

Academic offices
Preceded by John Appleton	Master of University College, Oxford c. 1408–1420	Succeeded by Robert Burton
Preceded by Walter Treugof	Chancellor of the University of Oxford; 1421–1426	Succeeded by Thomas Chase
Government offices
Preceded by John Stone	King's Clerk; 1420	Succeeded by William Alnwick
