= William Grigg (Master of Clare College, Cambridge) =

Master of Clare College from 1713–1726

William Grigg, (died 9 April 1726) D.D. was Master of Clare College from 1713 until his death.

Morgan was born in Middlesex and educated at St Paul's School, London and Jesus College, Cambridge. He became Fellow of Jesus in 1696. He was ordained a priest in the Church of England in 1707. He held livings at Whittlesford and Trowbridge. Wilcox was Vice-Chancellor of the University of Cambridge between 1716 and 1717.

He died on 9 April 1726.
