= William Kexby =

Master of University College, Oxford

William Kexby MA (aka William de Kexby; fl. 1376–1379) was a late 14th-century Master of University College, Oxford, England.

Kexby was a Fellow of University College and he subsequently became Master of the College. In 1379, he was Archdeacon of Cleveland.

== See also ==
- Kexby, North Yorkshire

Academic offices
Preceded by Roger de Aswardby	Master of University College, Oxford fl. 1376–1379	Succeeded by Thomas Foston
