= Rosamond Joscelyne Mitchell =

English historian, writer and archivist

Rosamond Joscelyne Mitchell (13 June 1902 – 19 November 1963), also known by her married name Rosamond Leys, was an English historian, writer and archivist.

== Biography ==
Mitchell was born in Harrow-on-the-Hill in 1902, the daughter of the architect Arnold Mitchell. She studied history as an exhibition scholar at St Hugh's College, Oxford in 1921–1924. She earned a BLitt for her thesis, John Tiptoft, Earl of Worcester : a study in English Humanism, in 1929.

Mitchell won the Royal Historical Society's Alexander Prize in 1936, and in 1938 won the British Archaeological Association's Reginald Taylor Prize. Roberto Weiss cited her in his book Humanism in England during the Fifteenth Century and she cited him in her book John Free, From Bristol to Rome in the Fifteenth Century.

In 1938 Mitchell married John Alan Leys, a market gardener and the youngest son of the barrister and novelist John Kirkwood Leys. Afterwards, she "chose not to seek an academic post". They had a son in 1941 and Mitchell helped in her husband's business until their retirement in 1951.

Mitchell died after a motor accident in 1963.

== Bibliography ==
- English People of the Past, with M. J. Whicher (Longmans Green, 1931)
- Life and Adventure in Medieval Europe (Longmans Green, 1934)
- Ye Goode Olde Dayes, with Ierne L. Plunket (Methuen, 1934)
- John Tiptoft, 1427–1470 (Longmans Green, 1938)
- A History of the English People, with M. D. R. Leys (Longmans Green, 1950)
- John Free, from Bristol to Rome in the fifteenth century (Longmans Green, 1955)
- A History of London Life, with M. D. R. Leys (Longmans Green, 1958)
- The Medieval Feast (Longmans Green, 1958)
- The Medieval Tournament (Longmans Green, 1958)
- A Country Doctor in the Days of Queen Anne (Longmans Green, 1959)
- The Laurels and the Tiara: Pope Pius II, 1458–1464 (Harvill Press, 1962)
- The Spring Voyage: The Jerusalem Pilgrimage in 1458 (John Murray, 1964)
