= M. D. R. Leys =

Mary Dorothy Rose Leys (8 October 1890 – 6 September 1967) was a British historian and academic, who was involved in the work of the Catholic Social Guild and the Catholic Record Society.

Leys was born in Tylers Green, Buckinghamshire. Her obituary in The Times states that she was educated at home because her family were too poor to afford school fees. Her Scottish father, John Kirkwood Leys, was a lawyer and novelist and died in 1909.

In 1911, she was awarded a scholarship to Somerville College, Oxford. She taught history at St Anne's College, Oxford, from 1919 until her retirement in 1955.

== Works ==
- An Introduction to Political Economy, Catholic Social Guild, 1934.
- Men, Money and Markets, Cobden-Sanderson, 1936; reissued with a new chapter, Longmans, 1940.
- European Catholics and the Social Question, Catholic Social Guild, 1943; completely revised ed., 1956.
- A History of the English People, with R. J. Mitchell, Longmans, 1950; reissued by Pan Books, 1967.
- Between Two Empires: a history of French politicians and people between 1814 and 1848, Longmans, 1955.
- A History of London Life with R. J. Mitchell, Longmans, 1958; reissued by Penguin, 1963.
- Catholics in England, 1559-1829: a social history, Longmans, 1961.
