= Anthony Salveyn =

Anthony Salveyn (a.k.a. Anthony Salvin) was a Master of University College, Oxford, England.

Anthony Salveyn was Master of Sherburn Hospital in County Durham and also held a stall as a canon at Durham Cathedral. He was a Fellow of University College and elected Master of the College in 1557. He resigned from the post the following year in December 1558. The previous month, Queen Elizabeth I had succeeded her sister Queen Mary. He was not a supporter of the Reformation. In the following year, he lost his post at Sherburn and was confined to Kirby Moorside.

Anthony Salveyn was probably the brother of Richard Salveyn, who preceded George Ellison as Master of University College.

Academic offices
Preceded by George Ellison	Master of University College, Oxford; 1557–1558	Succeeded by James Dugdale
