= Richard Salveyn =

Richard Salveyn (a.k.a. Richard Salvin) was a Master of University College, Oxford, England.

Salveyn was from a Durham family. He was a Fellow of University College and became Master of the college in June 1547. He resigned from the position in October 1551. He was not a supporter of the Reformation and was later deprived of his livings in the reign of Queen Elizabeth I.

Anthony Salveyn, Master of University College from 1557 to 1558, was probably Richard Salveyn's brother.

Academic offices
Preceded by John Crayford	Master of University College, Oxford; 1547–1551	Succeeded by George Ellison
