= Edward Leeds (priest) =

English clergyman

Edward Leeds (died 1589), was an English clergyman who became Master of Clare College, Cambridge.

Leeds, the second son of William Leeds, by Elizabeth Vinall, was born in Benenden, Kent. He was educated at Cambridge, graduated B.A. 1542-3, proceeded M.A. 1545, and in 1569 was created LL.D. The date of his first degree sufficiently disproves the statement that he was a monk of Ely. On 20 June 1548 Bishop Goodrich collated him to the rectory of Little Gransden in Cambridgeshire, and in the same year he became prebendary of Ely. In 1550 he was commissary and vicar-general to the bishop, and was engaged in destroying altars and other things deemed superstitious in the diocese. In 1551 he was made rector of Newton, Ely, and served the chapelry of St Mary-by-the-Sea; and on 12 February 1551-2 he obtained the rectory of Elm in the Isle of Ely-cum-Emneth, Norfolk. He was also chancellor to Bishop Goodrich.

In 1553 he resigned Little Gransden and Newton. When Bishop Goodrich died in 1554 Leeds was one of his executors. Probably he lost his prebend during Mary's reign. On 28 February 1558-9 he was appointed to the eighth stall in Ely Cathedral. About the same time he was requested by William Cecil to join with Pory and Matthew Parker in settling a dispute between the president and fellows of Queens' College, Cambridge. In 1559 he was one of Parker's chaplains, and at Parker's appointment to the archbishopric his name was appended to an opinion by certain civilians, added to what was known as the supplentes clause of the letters patent, affirming the validity of the confirmation and consecration.

At various times he visited the dioceses of Canterbury, Rochester, Peterborough, and Ely. In 1560 he became an advocate of Doctors' Commons, and afterwards was made a master in chancery. In 1560 also he became precentor of Canterbury and master of Clare Hall, Cambridge. On 20 June 1560 he was made precentor of Lichfield, but he resigned this appointment before 16 May in the following year. He also appears to have been rector of Cottenham, Snailwell, and Littleport in Cambridgeshire, and master of St John's Hospital, Ely. Parker employed him with Dr Perne in 1568 to compose the differences which had arisen in Corpus Christi College. In 1570, Leeds, who had probably acquired a fortune by his practice in Doctors' Commons, purchased from Sir Richard Sackville the manor of Croxton in Cambridgeshire. He rebuilt the manor-house, and in 1571 ceased to be master of Clare.

On 14 July 1573 he became rector of Croxton. In 1580 he resigned his prebend at Ely. He died 17 February 1589, and was buried at Croxton, where a little figure of him in brass was placed in the church with an epitaph. He founded ten scholarships at Clare, and gave one thousand marks towards the building of Emmanuel College.
