= Roland Swynbourne =

English priest & academic

Roland Swynbourne was an English priest and academic in the 16th century.

Swynbourne was born in Chopwell and educated at the University. He graduated B.A in 1517; M.A in 1520; and B.D. in 1545. He became Fellow of Clare Hall in 1530. He was ordained on 15 June 1527 and held incumbencies at Little Shelford and North Stoneham. He was twice Master of Clare Hall, Cambridge: from 1539 to 1549, and from 1553 until his death in 1557.
