= Obadiah Walker =

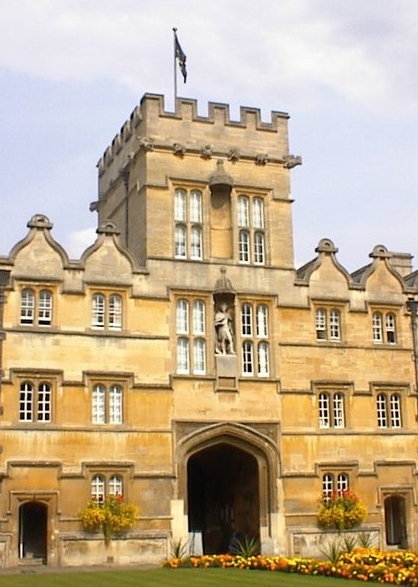
- The tower in the main quad of University College, Oxford with a statue of King James II installed by Obadiah Walker.
- Born: 1616; Darfield, Yorkshire
- Died: January 1699 (aged 82–83)
- Education: University College, Oxford
- Title: Master of University College, Oxford
- Term: 1676–1688
- Predecessor: Richard Clayton
- Successor: Edward Farrer

Obadiah Walker (1616 – 21 January 1699) was an English academic and Master of University College, Oxford, from 1676 to 1688.

== Life ==
Walker was born at Darfield, Yorkshire, and was educated at University College, Oxford, becoming a fellow and tutor of this College and a prominent figure in University circles. In July 1648, an act of parliament deprived him of his academic appointments, and he passed some years in teaching, studying and travelling. He returned to Oxford at the Restoration of 1660, and a few years began later to take a leading part in the work of University College. In June 1676, he became head or "Master" of the college, and in this capacity he collected money for some rebuilding, and arranged the publication by the college of a Latin edition of Sir John Spelman's Life of Alfred the Great.

This was the time of Titus Oates and the "Popish Plot", and some of Walker's writings made him a suspect; however, no serious steps were taken against him, although Oxford booksellers were forbidden to sell his book, The benefits of our Saviour Jesus Christ to mankind. He remained a Protestant, in name at least, until the accession of James II. Soon after this event he became a Roman Catholic, opening a Catholic chapel at University College, and he advised the new king with regard to affairs in Oxford, being partly responsible for the tactless conduct of James in forcing a quarrel with the fellows of Magdalen College. Mass was said in his residence, and later a chapel was opened in the college for Catholic worship; he and others received a royal licence to absent themselves from the services of the Church of England, and he obtained another to supervise the printing of Roman Catholic books.

In spite of growing unpopularity, he remained loyal to James, and when the king fled from England, Walker left Oxford, doubtless intending to join his master abroad. But in December 1688, he was arrested at Sittingbourne and was imprisoned; then, having lost his mastership, he was charged at the bar of the House of Commons with changing his religion and with other offences. Early in 1690, he was released from his confinement, and spent his last years subsisting largely on the charity of his friend and former pupil at University College, Dr John Radcliffe. Radcliffe gave Walker an east window for his chapel at the College and also a pension.

Walker was responsible for the statue of King James II on the tower in the main quad at University College, one of only two in England. The other statue is located in Trafalgar Square, London.

He died in 1699 and is buried in Old St Pancras Churchyard, London.

== Works ==
Walker's principal writings are: Of education, especially of young gentlemen (Oxford, 1673, and six other editions) Ars rationis ad mentem nominalium libri tres (Oxford, 1673) Greek and Roman History illustrated by Coins and Medals (London, 1692).

== Sources ==
- Carr, William (1899). "Walker, Obadiah" . In Lee, Sidney (ed.). Dictionary of National Biography. Vol. 59. London: Smith, Elder & Co.
- Beddard, R. A. P. J. "Walker, Obadiah (1616–1699)". Oxford Dictionary of National Biography (online ed.). Oxford University Press. doi:10.1093/ref:odnb/28505. (Subscription, Wikipedia Library access or UK public library membership required.)
- Hobhouse, Christopher (1948). Oxford: As it was and as it is today (4th ed.). London: B. T. Batsford.

Academic offices
Preceded by Richard Clayton	Master of University College, Oxford; 1676–1688	Succeeded by Edward Farrer
