= University College, Oxford =

College of the University of Oxford

University College
- University of Oxford
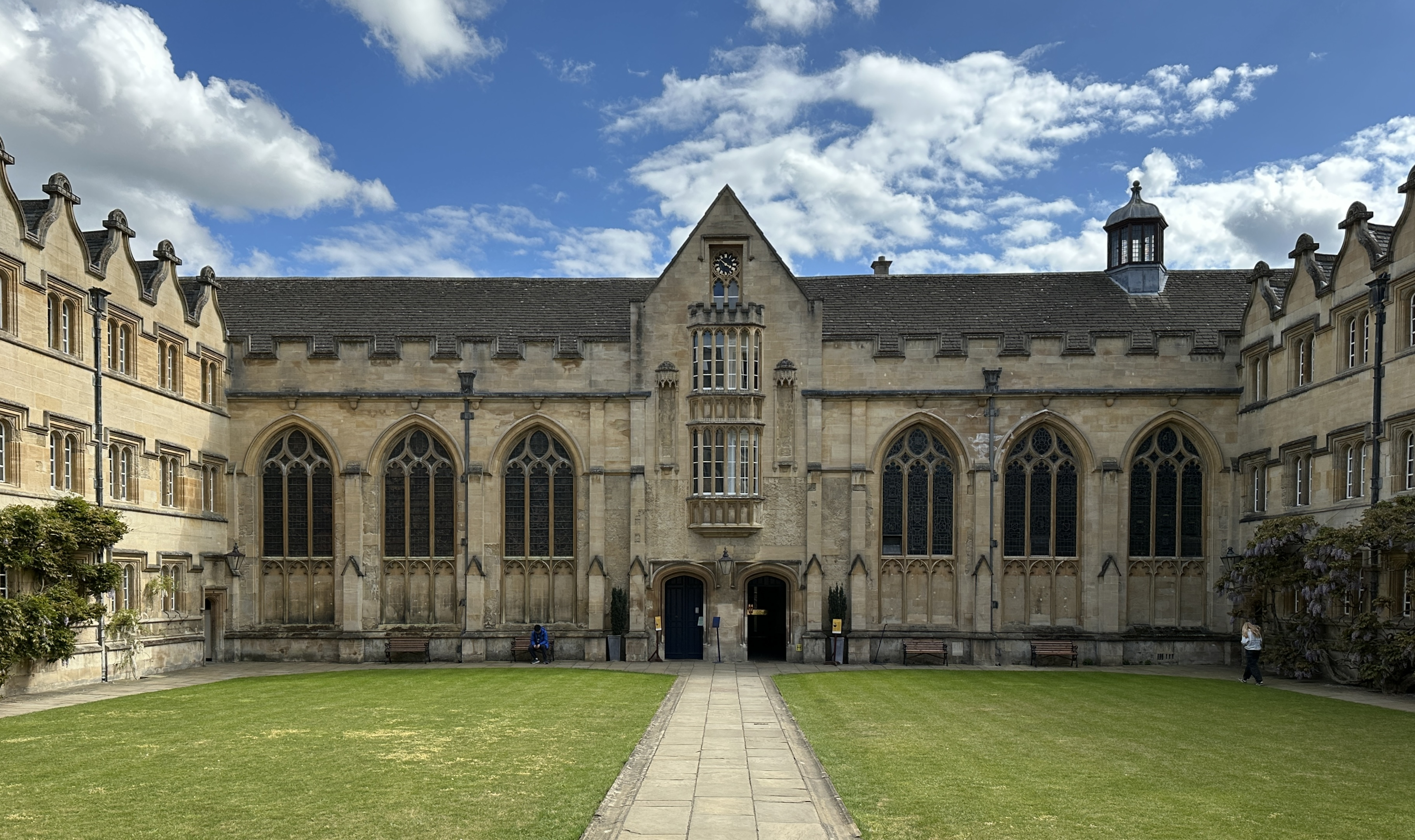
- Main Quadrangle of University College

- Arms: Azure, a cross patonce between four [sometimes five] martlets Or.
Scarf colours: navy, with two narrow yellow stripes a quarter of a scarf-width in from either edge
- Location: High Street, Oxford OX1 4BH
- Coordinates: 51.7525°N 1.2520°W
- Full name: The College of the Great Hall of the University of Oxford
- Latin name: Collegium Magnae Aulae Universitatis
- Established: 1249; 777 years ago
- Sister college: Trinity Hall, Cambridge
- Master: Valerie Amos, Baroness Amos
- Undergraduates: 425 (2023–24)
- Postgraduates: 219 (2023–24)
- Endowment: £156.7 million (2024)
- Visitor: Charles III, The Crown ex officio
- Website: www.univ.ox.ac.uk
- JCR: www.univjcr.com
- WCR: wcr.univ.ox.ac.uk
- Boat club: University College Boat Club

Map
- Location within Oxford city centre

University College, formally The Master and Fellows of the College of the Great Hall of the University commonly called University College in the University of Oxford and colloquially referred to as "Univ", is a constituent college of the University of Oxford in England. It has a claim to being the oldest college of the university, having been founded by William of Durham in 1249.

As of 2024, the college had an estimated financial endowment of £156.679 million, and their total net assets amounted to £255.431 million.

The college is associated with a number of influential people, including Clement Attlee, Harold Wilson, Bill Clinton, Peter Beinart, Festus Mogae, Stephen Hawking, C. S. Lewis, R. F. Kuang, William Beveridge, Bob Hawke, Robert Cecil, Tom Hooper, Percy Bysshe Shelley, Kingman Brewster Jr., and Christian Cole, the first Black student to graduate from the university.

== History ==
A legend arose in the 14th century that the college was founded by King Alfred in 872. This explains why the college arms are those attributed to King Alfred, why the Visitor is always the reigning monarch, and why the college celebrated its millennium in 1872. Most agree, however, that the college was founded in 1249 by William of Durham. He bequeathed money to support ten or twelve masters of arts studying divinity; a property that became known as Aula Universitatis (University Hall) was bought in 1253. This later date still allows the claim that Univ is the oldest of the Oxford colleges, although this is contested by Balliol College and Merton College.

The college acquired four properties on its current site south of the High Street in 1332 and 1336 and built a quadrangle in the 15th century. As it grew in size and wealth, its medieval buildings were replaced with the current Main Quadrangle in the 17th century. Although the foundation stone was placed on 17 April 1634, the disruption of the English Civil War meant it was not completed until sometime in 1676. Radcliffe Quad followed more rapidly by 1719, and the library was built in 1861.

Like many of Oxford's colleges, University College accepted its first mixed-sex cohort in 1979, having previously been an institution for men only.

== Buildings ==
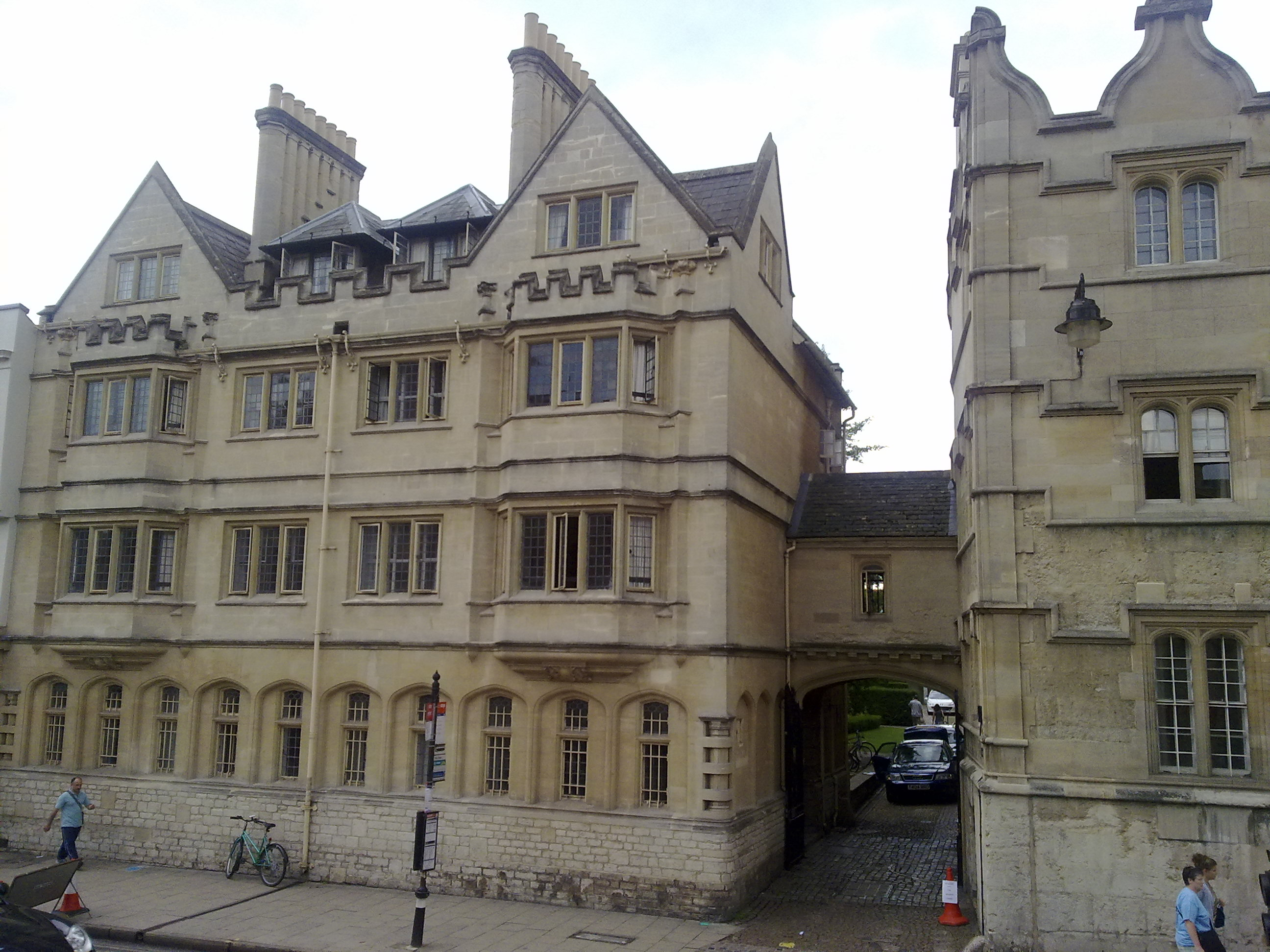
The Logic Lane covered bridge above Logic Lane running through University College, as viewed from the High Street.

The main entrance to the college is on the High Street and its grounds are bounded by Merton Street and Magpie Lane. The college is divided by Logic Lane, which is owned by the college and runs through the centre. The western side of the college is occupied by the library, the hall, the chapel and the two quadrangles which house both student accommodation and college offices. The eastern side of the college is mainly devoted to student accommodation in rooms above the High Street shops, on Merton Street or in the separate Goodhart Building. This building is named after former master of the college, Arthur Lehman Goodhart.

A specially constructed building in the college, the Shelley Memorial, houses a statue by Edward Onslow Ford of the poet Percy Bysshe Shelley – a former member of the college, who was sent down for writing The Necessity of Atheism (1811), along with his friend T. J. Hogg. Shelley is depicted lying dead on the Italian seashore.

The college annexe on Staverton Road in North Oxford houses undergraduate students during their second year and some graduate students.

The college owns the University College Boathouse (completed in 2007 and designed by Belsize architects) and a sports ground, which is located nearby on Abingdon Road.

The college is known for hosting one of the only two remaining statues in the United Kingdom of King James II and VII of Scotland, on the south side of the western gateway of the college.

== Student life ==
There are around 425 undergraduates and 219 postgraduates at the college. Between 2022 and 2024, around 68% of undergraduates admitted studied at state schools.

The college awards organ and choral scholarships. There are also music groups such as the Martlett Ensemble, music society and a chapel choir.

There are two common rooms, the Junior Common Room (JCR) and Middle Common Room (called the Weir Common Room).

=== Univ Alternative Prospectus ===
The Alternative Prospectus is written and produced by current students for prospective applicants. The publication was awarded a HELOA Innovation and Best Practice Award in 2011. The Univ Alternative Prospectus offers student written advice and guidance to potential Oxford applicants. The award recognises the engagement of the college community, unique newspaper format, forward-thinking use of social media and the collaborative working between staff and students.

=== Grace ===
University has the longest grace of any Oxford (and perhaps Cambridge) college. It is read before every Formal Hall, which is held on Wednesdays, Fridays, and some Sundays. The reading is performed by a Scholar of the college and whoever is sitting at the head of High Table (typically the Master, or the most senior Fellow at the table if the Master is not dining).

Latin	English
SCHOLAR – Benedictus sit Deus in donis suis. RESPONSE – Et sanctus in omnibus operibus suis. SCHOLAR – Adiutorium nostrum in Nomine Domini. RESPONSE – Qui fecit coelum et terram. SCHOLAR – Sit Nomen Domini benedictum. RESPONSE – Ab hoc tempore usque in saecula. SCHOLAR – Domine Deus, Resurrectio et Vita credentium, Qui semper es laudandus tam in viventibus quam in defunctis, gratias Tibi agimus pro omnibus Fundatoribus caeterisque Benefactoribus nostris, quorum beneficiis hic ad pietatem et ad studia literarum alimur: Te rogantes ut nos, hisce Tuis donis ad Tuam gloriam recte utentes, una cum iis ad vitam immortalem perducamur. Per Jesum Christum Dominum nostrum. RESPONSE - Amen. SCHOLAR — Deus det vivis gratiam, defunctis requiem: Ecclesiae, Regi, Regnoque nostro, pacem et concordiam: et nobis peccatoribus vitam aeternam. RESPONSE - Amen.	SCHOLAR — Let God be blessed in his gifts. RESPONSE — And holy in all his works. SCHOLAR — Our help is in the Name of the Lord. RESPONSE — Who has made heaven and earth. SCHOLAR — May the Name of the Lord be blessed. RESPONSE — From this time for evermore. SCHOLAR — Lord God, the resurrection and the life of them that believe, who are always to be praised both among the living and among the dead, we give You thanks for all our founders and other benefactors, by whose gifts we are nourished here for piety and the study of letters; asking You that we, using these Your gifts rightly to Your glory, may be led together with them into eternal life. Through Jesus Christ our Lord. RESPONSE — Amen. SCHOLAR — May God grant to the living grace, and to the dead rest; to the Church, the King, and our realm, peace and concord; and to us sinners everlasting life. RESPONSE — Amen.

=== Sports ===
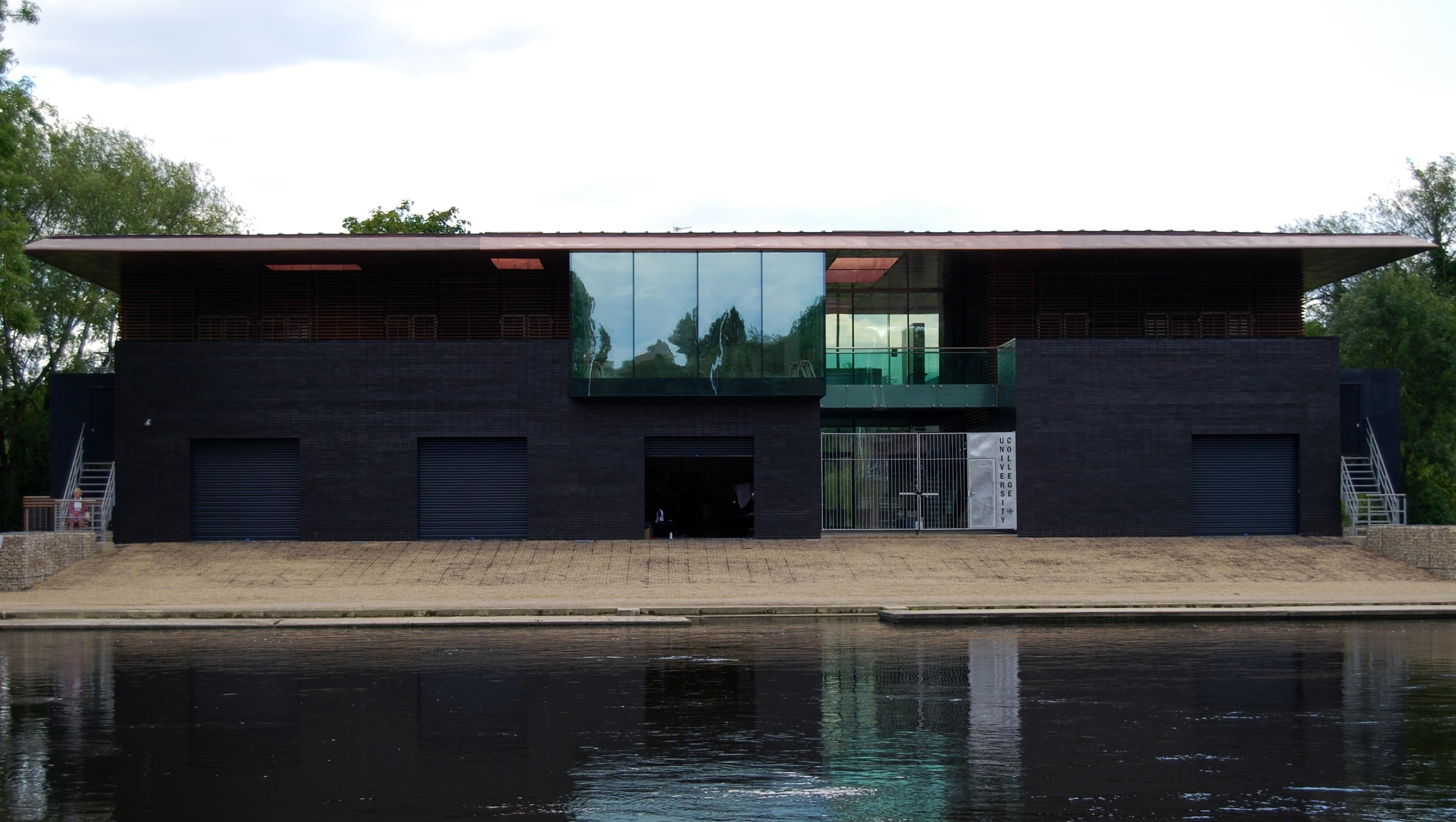
University College Boathouse, the boathouse of the college boat club

In common with other Oxford colleges, Univ provides sporting facilities for students, including a sports field on Abingdon Road where football, rugby, cricket, tennis and bowls are played. Students also have access to an onsite gym.

University College Boat Club (UCBC) is the rowing club for members of the college. Founded in 1827, the club is based at the University College Boathouse which was opened in 2007 and is shared with Wolfson, St Peter's and Somerville College boat clubs. The club has won multiple headships with both their Men's and Women's crews during Eights Week, most recently the women's 1st VIII was Head of the River in 2022.

== People associated with the college ==
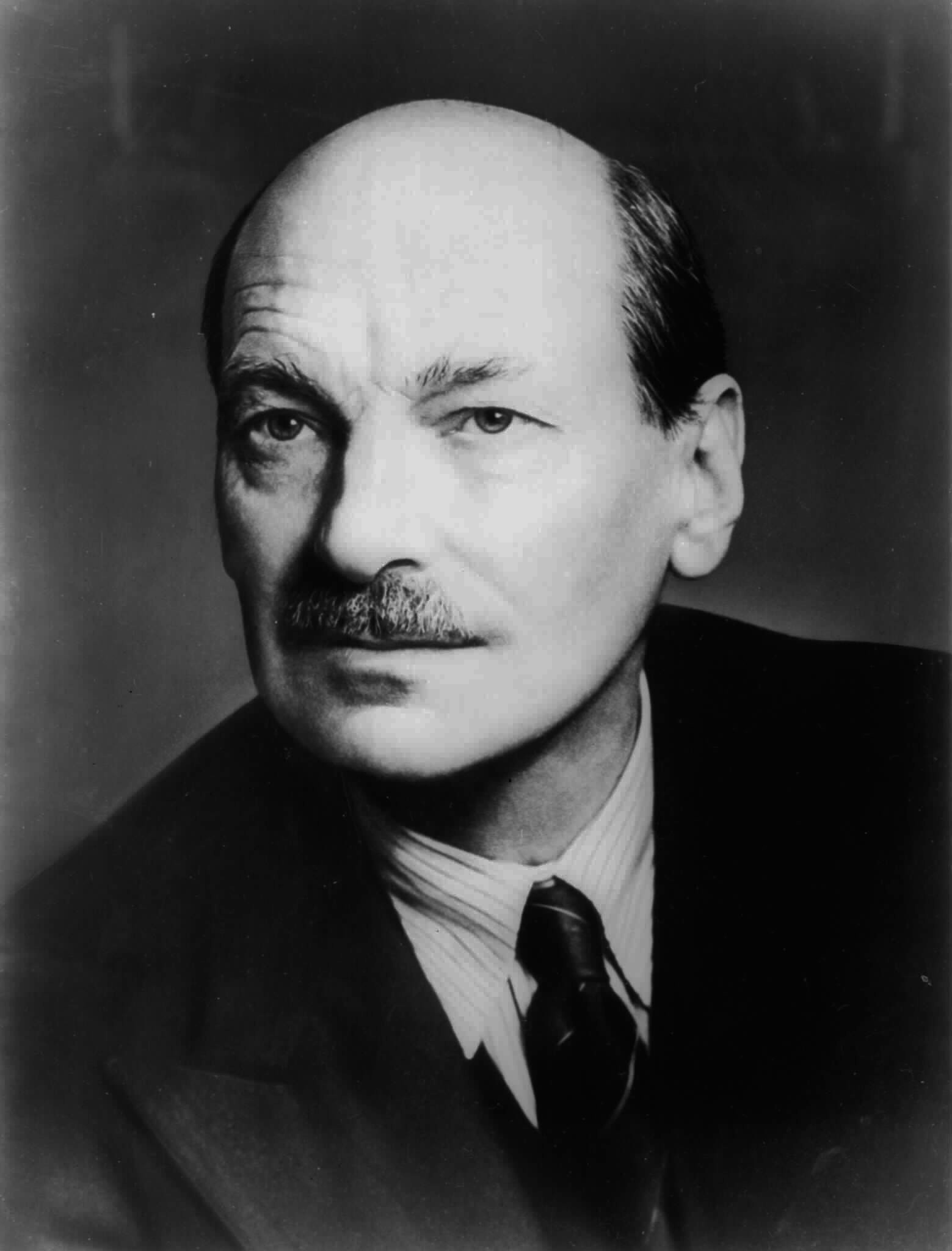
Clement Attlee, former prime minister of the United Kingdom

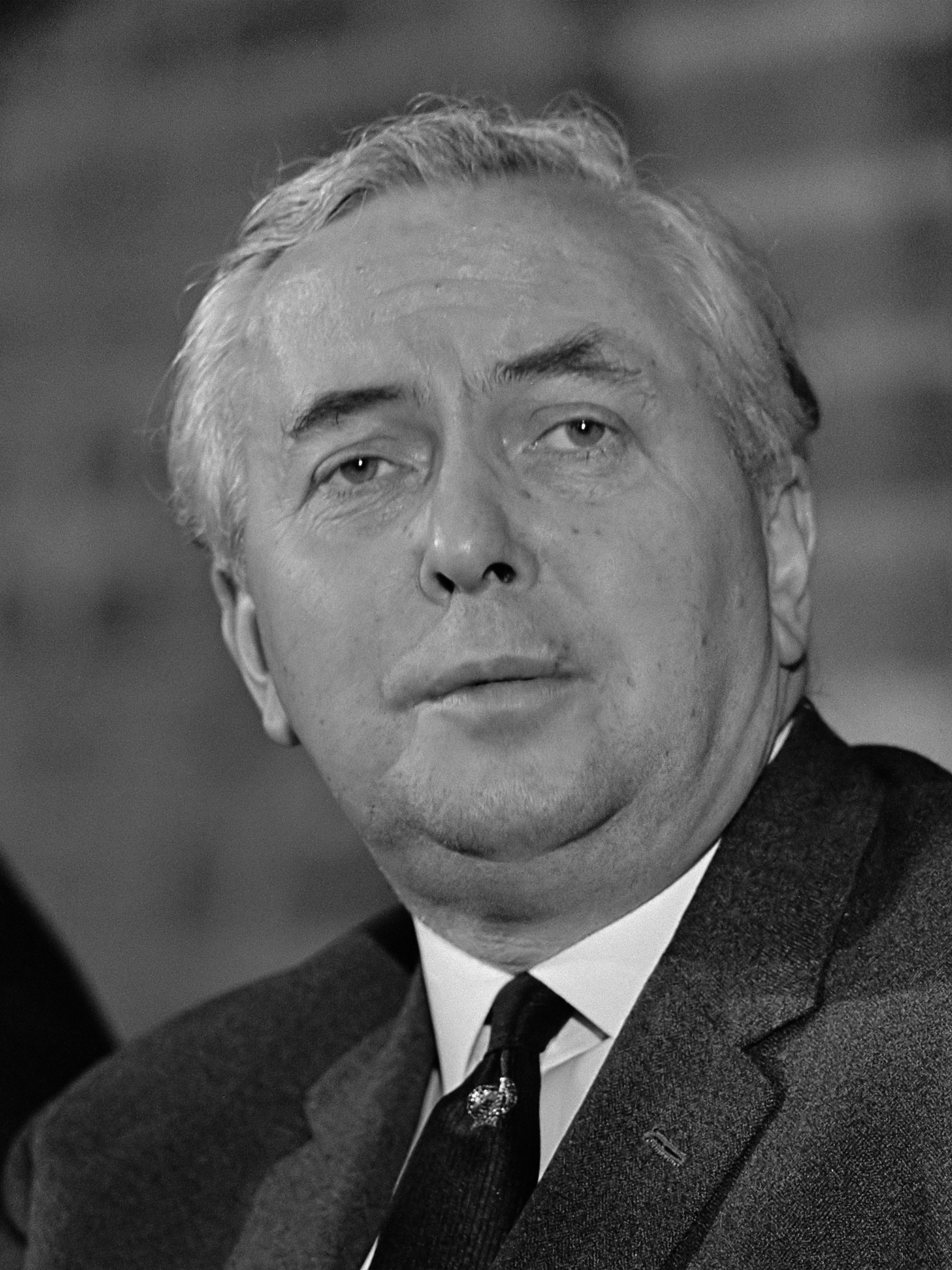
Harold Wilson, former prime minister of the United Kingdom

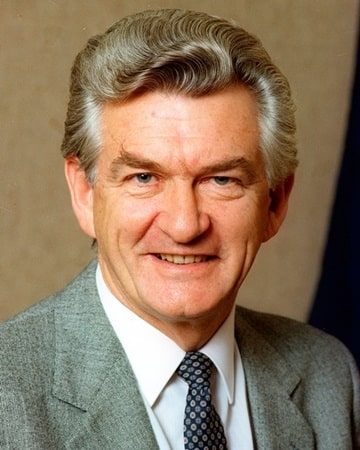
Bob Hawke, former prime minister of Australia

Bill Clinton, former president of the United States of America (did not graduate)

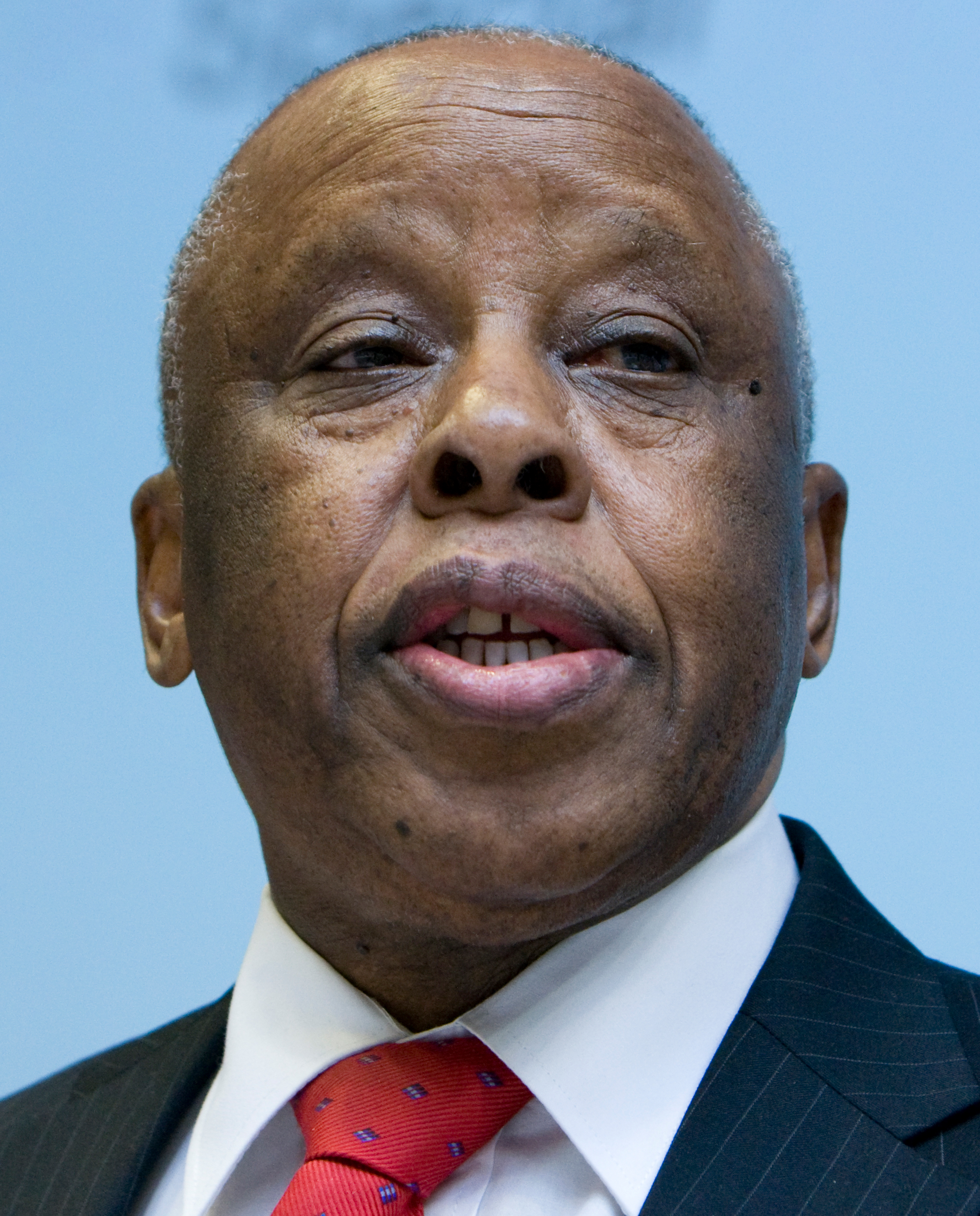
Festus Mogae, former president of Botswana

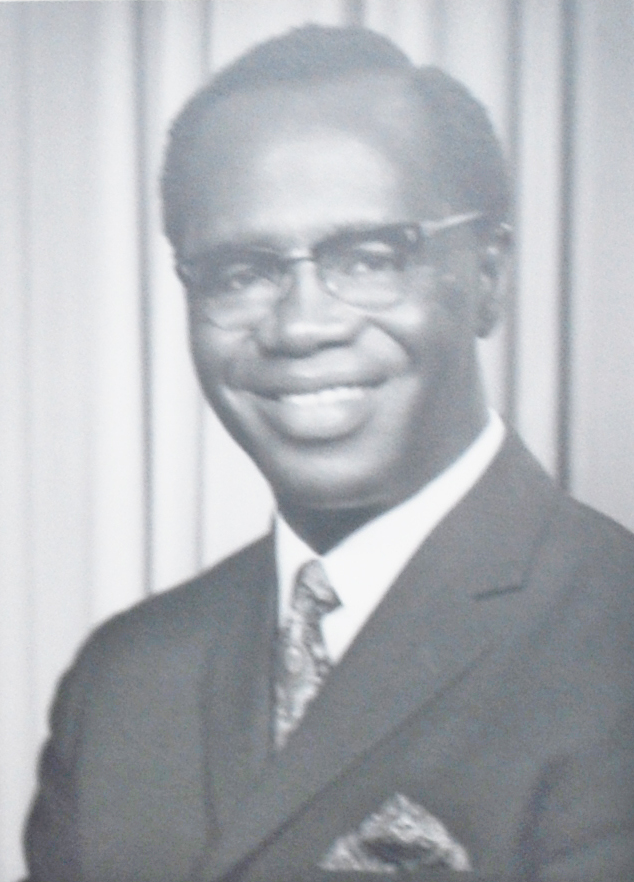
Kofi Abrefa Busia, former prime minister of Ghana

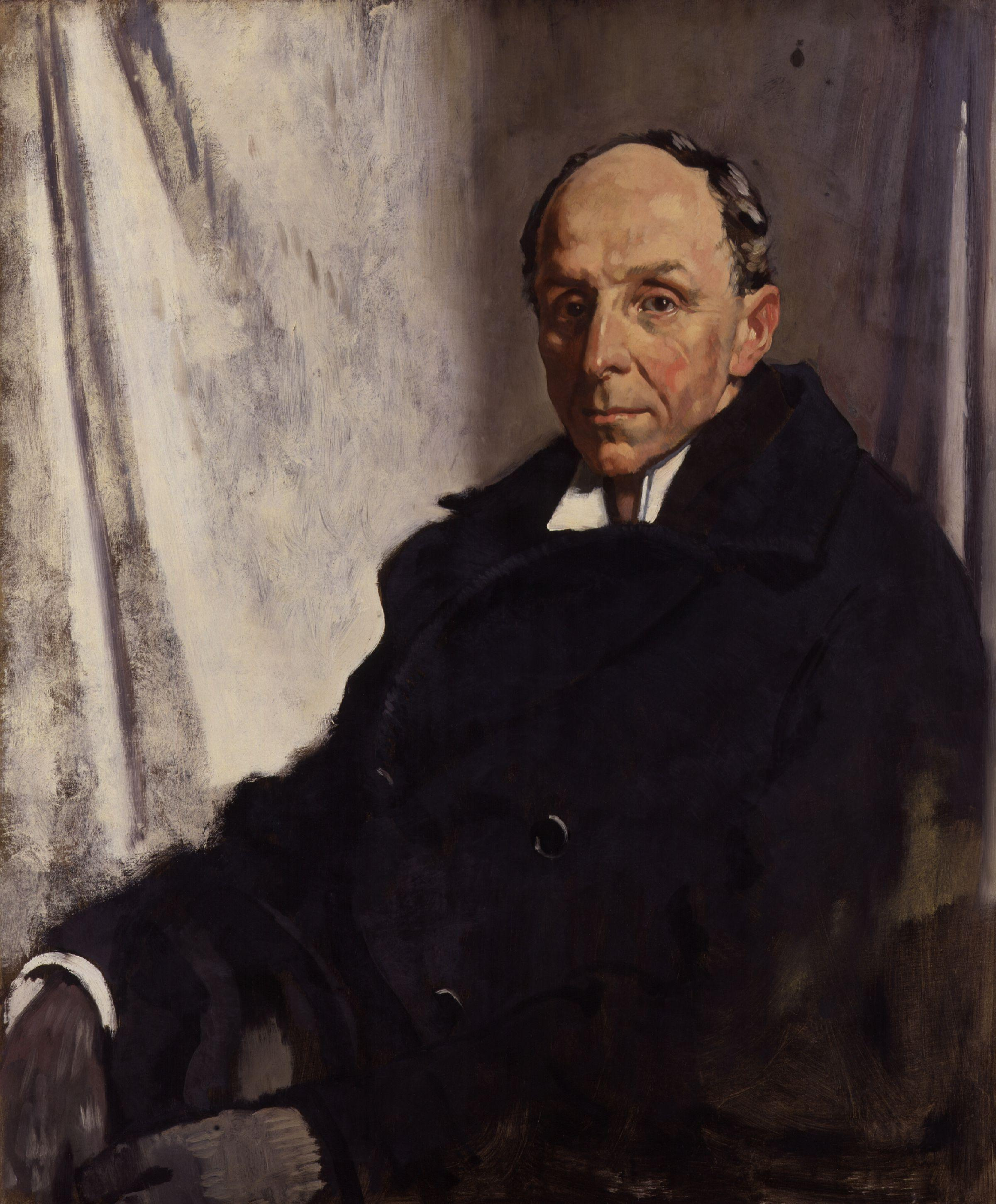
Robert Cecil, 1st Viscount Cecil of Chelwood, politician and recipient of the Nobel Peace Prize

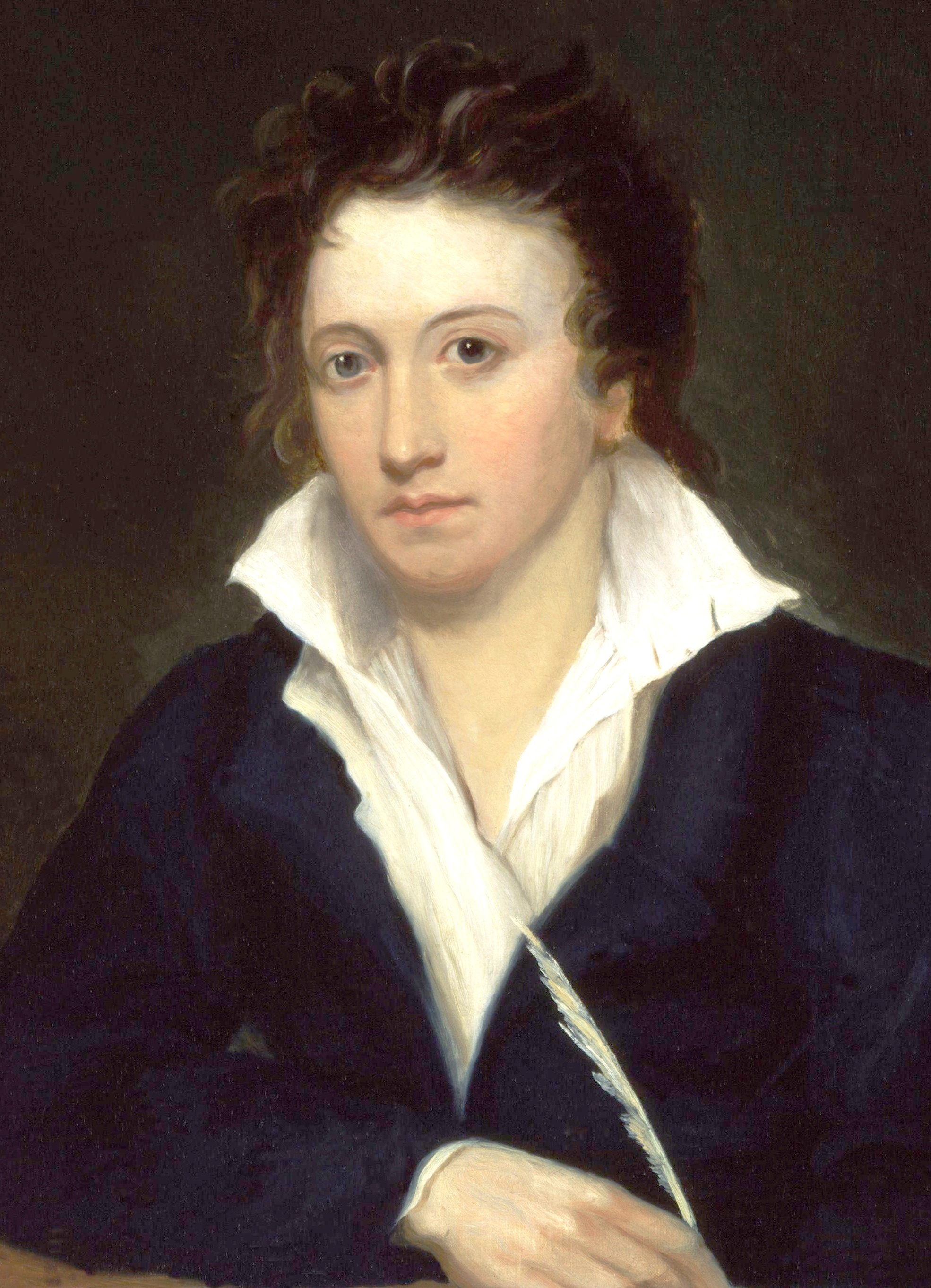
Percy Bysshe Shelley, Romantic poet

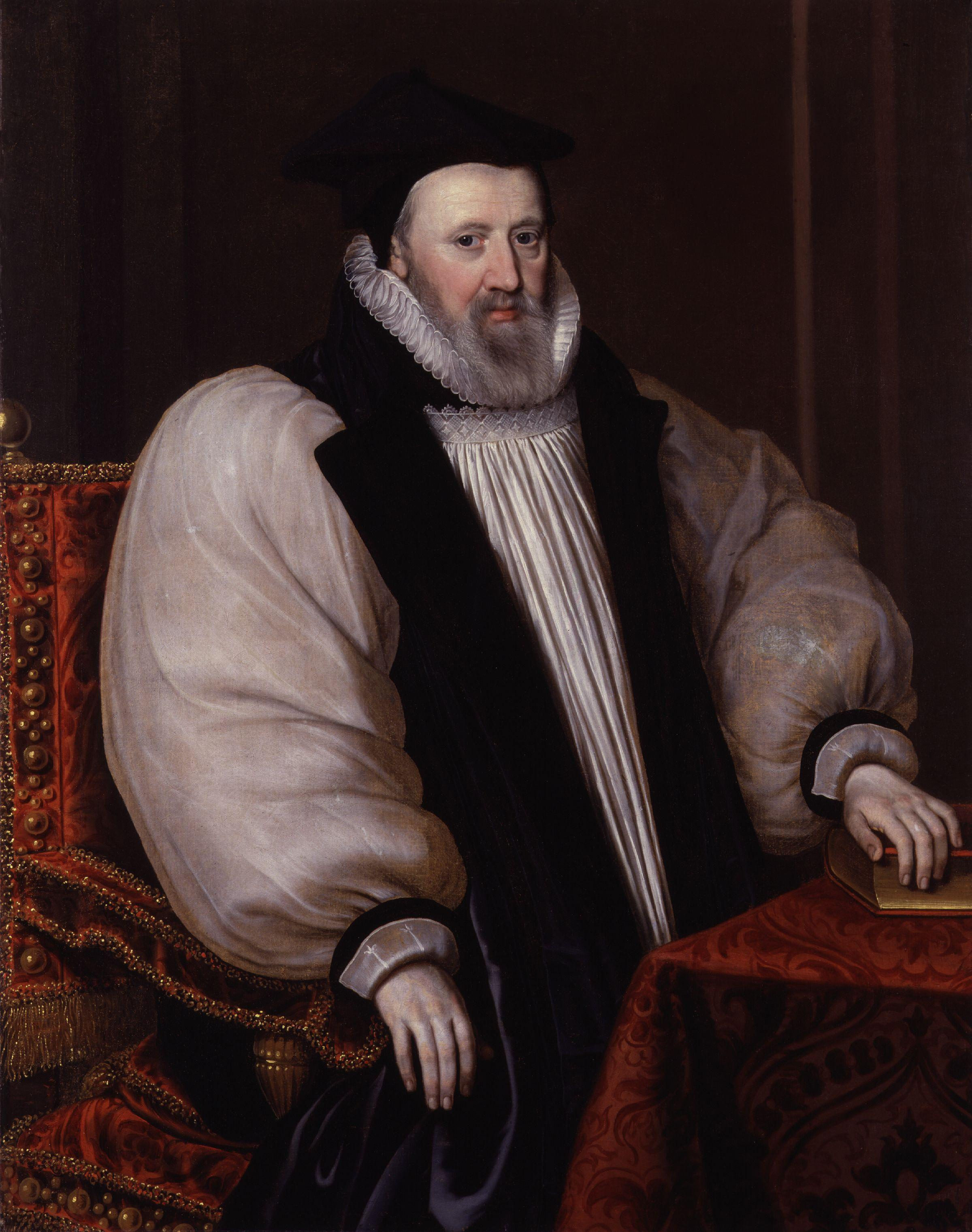
George Abbot, former archbishop of Canterbury

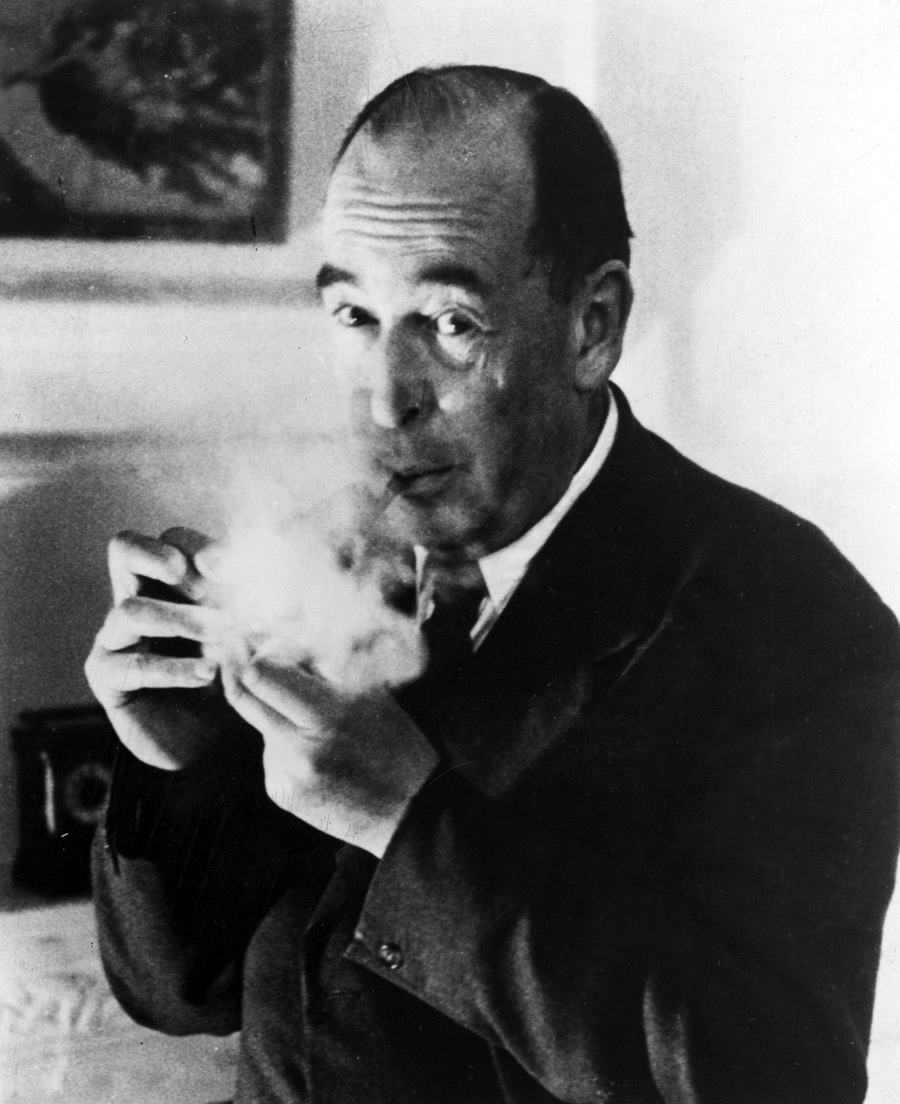
C. S. Lewis, author of the Chronicles of Narnia

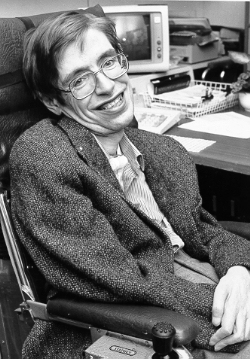
Stephen Hawking, theoretical physicist and cosmologist

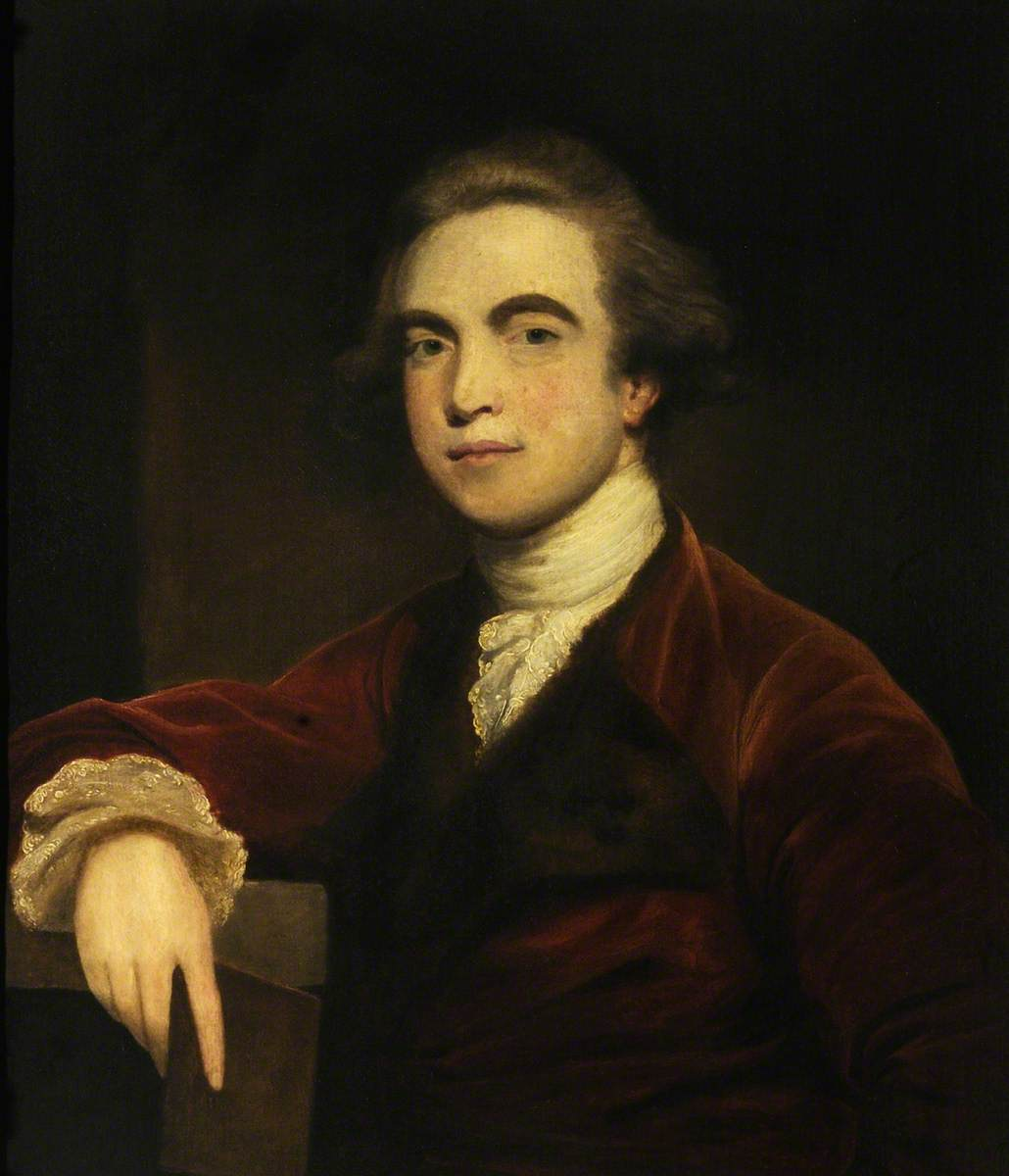
William Jones, philologist

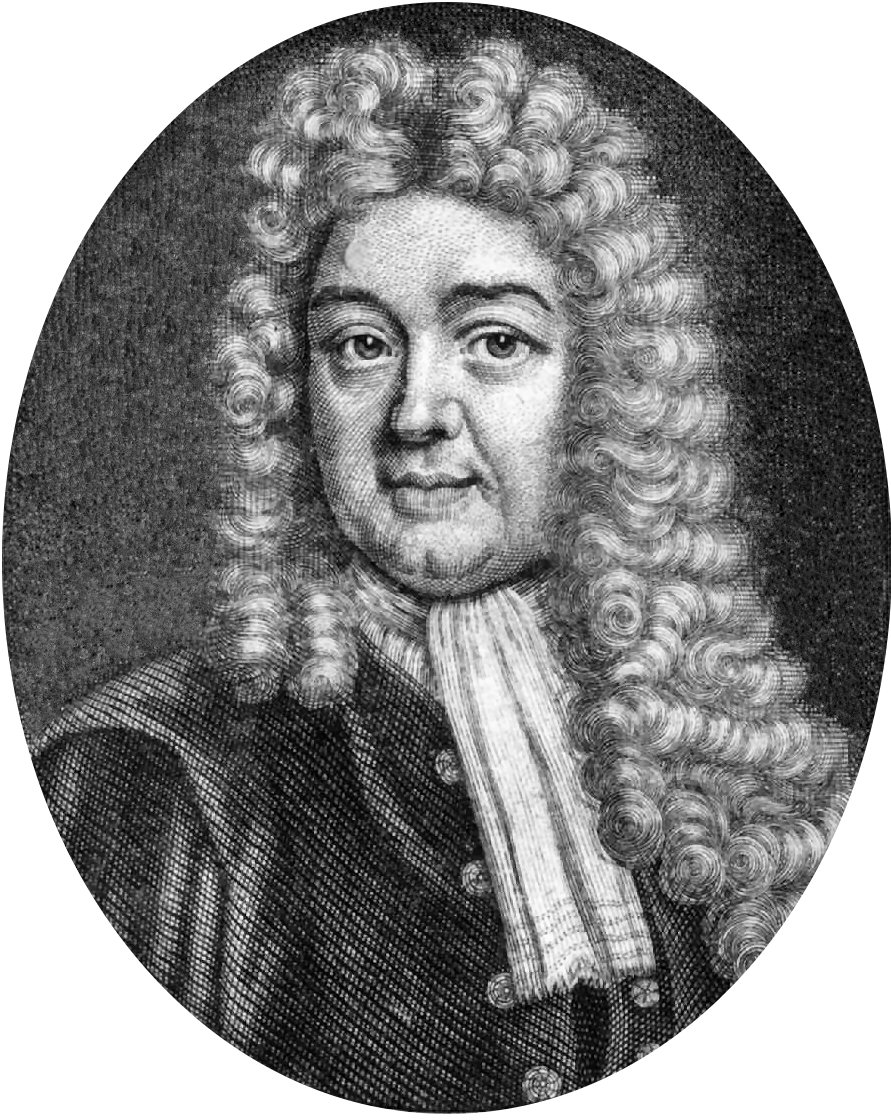
John Radcliffe, physician and academic

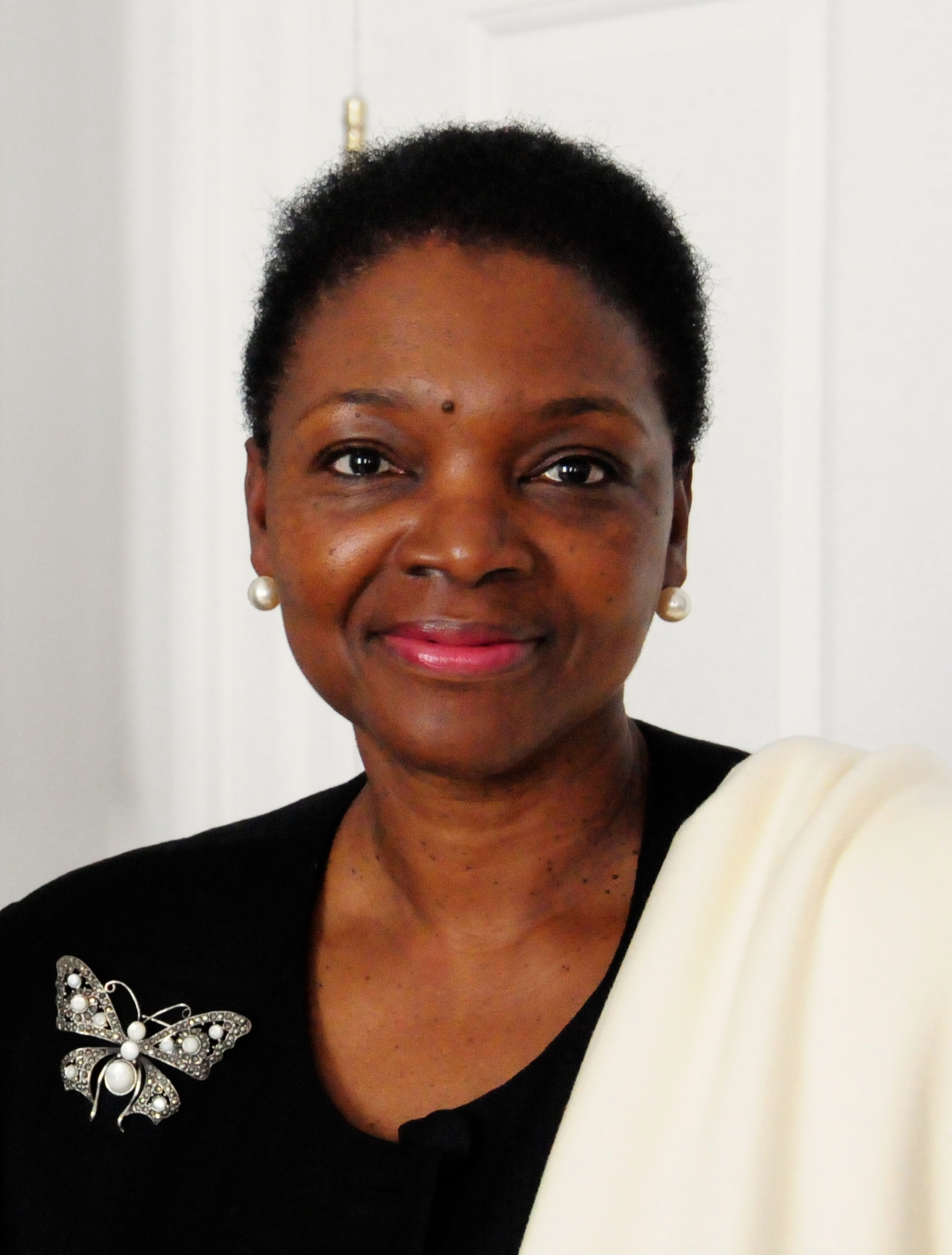
Valerie Amos, Baroness Amos, politician and diplomat

=== Other connections ===
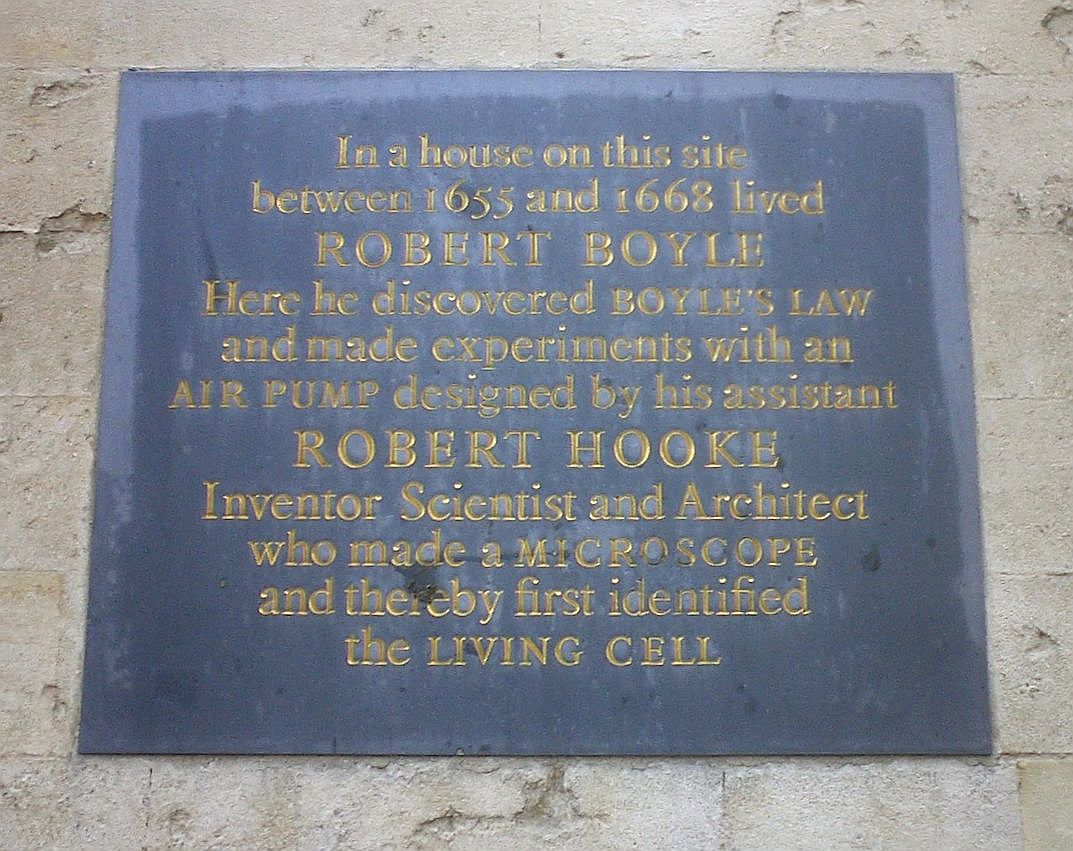
A plaque dedicated to Boyle and Hooke, telling of their achievements

Although not members of University College, the scientists Robert Boyle (sometimes described as the "first modern chemist") and his assistant (Robert Hooke, architect, biologist, discoverer of cells) lived in Deep Hall (then owned by Christ Church and now the site of the Shelley Memorial). The former made a contribution to the completion of University College's current Hall in the mid-17th century.

Samuel Johnson (author of A Dictionary of the English Language and a member of Pembroke College) was a frequent visitor to the Senior Common Room at University College during the 18th century.

William Beveridge (social reformer and author of the Beveridge Report) was Master of the college from 1937 to 1945.

One of Dame Maggie Smith's earliest performances was a 1953 production of He Who Gets Slapped produced by the college's dramatic society, the University College Players.

== Publications ==
The college produces a number of regular publications for college members.

=== University College Record ===
The University College Record is the annual magazine sent to alumni of the college each autumn. The magazine provides college news on clubs and societies such as the University College Players and the Devas Club, as well as academic performance and prizes. News about and obituaries of former students are included at the end of each issue.

Editors have included Peter Bayley and Leslie Mitchell.

=== The Martlet ===
The Martlet is a magazine for members and friends of the college, available in print and online.

== Gallery ==
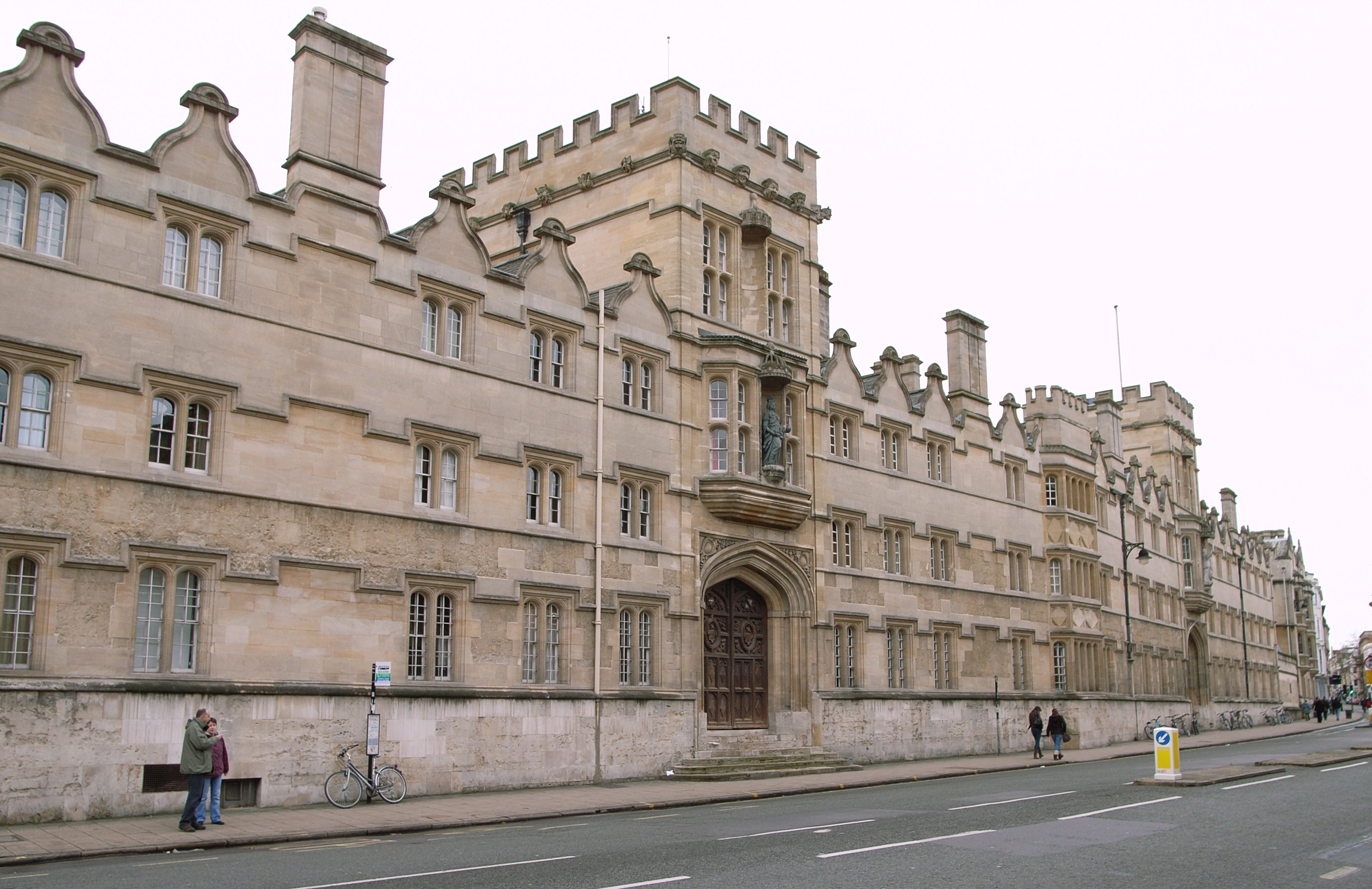
University College, on the south side of the High Street.

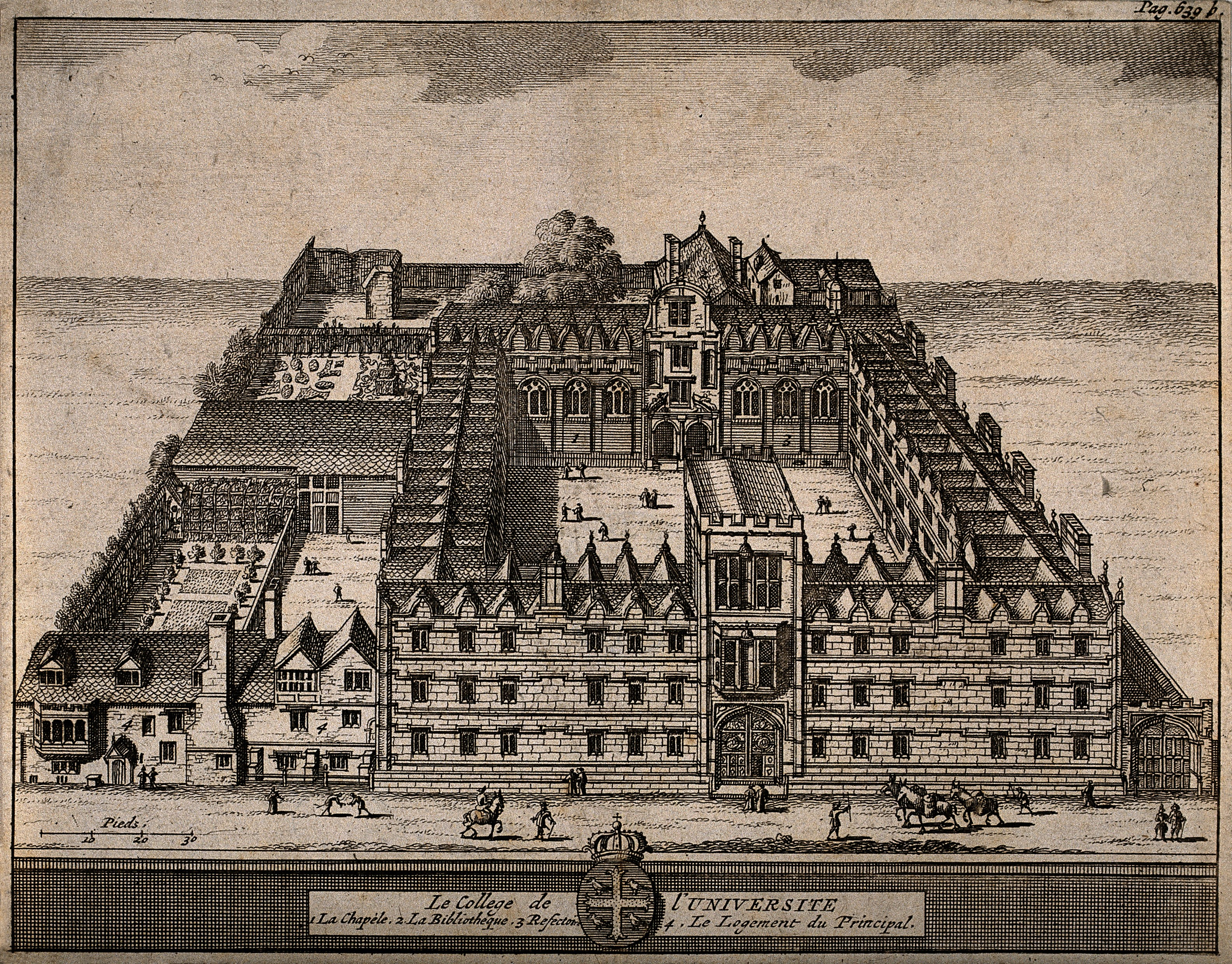
University College, Oxford: aerial view with key and scale.

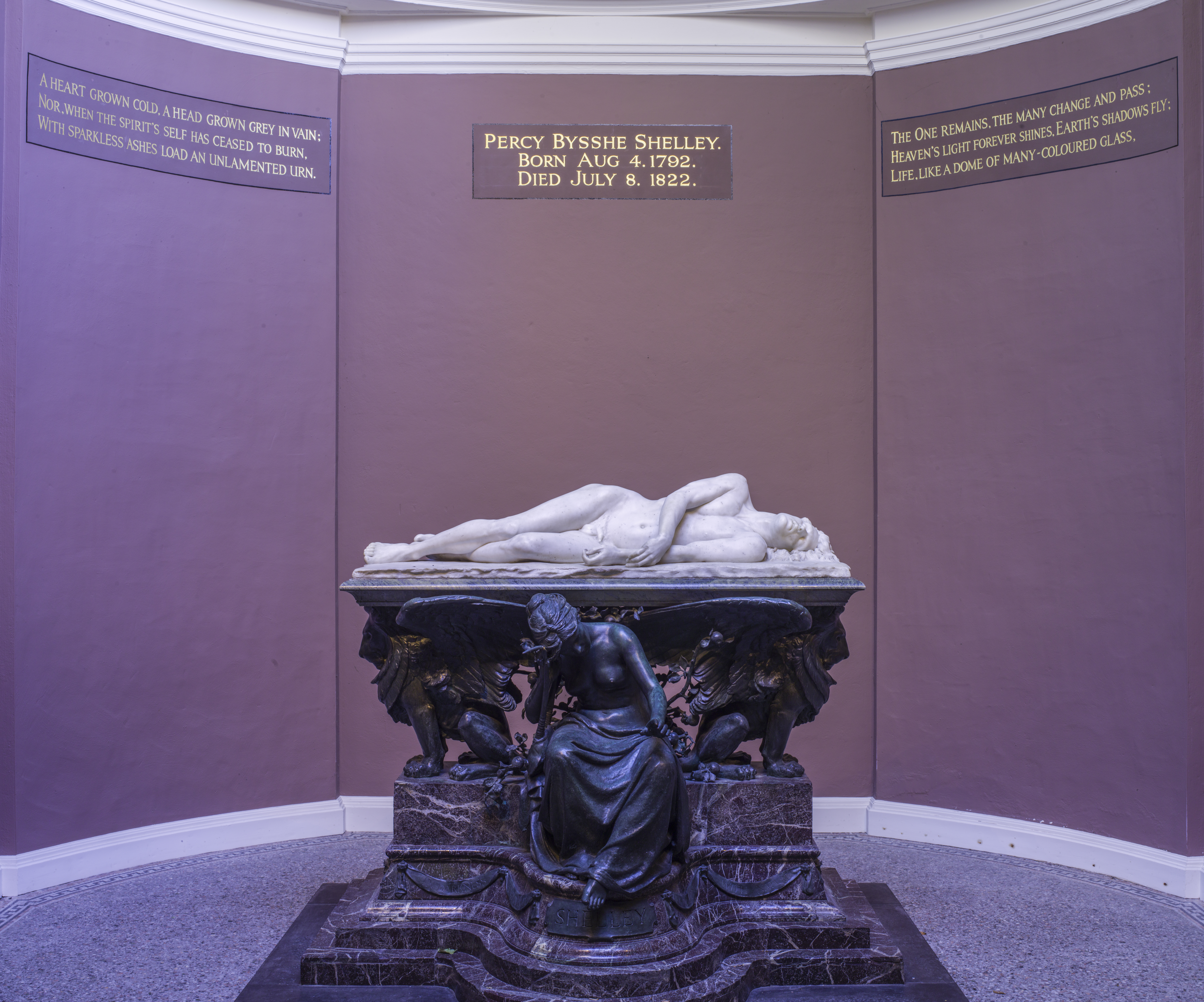
The Shelley Memorial at University College, Oxford.

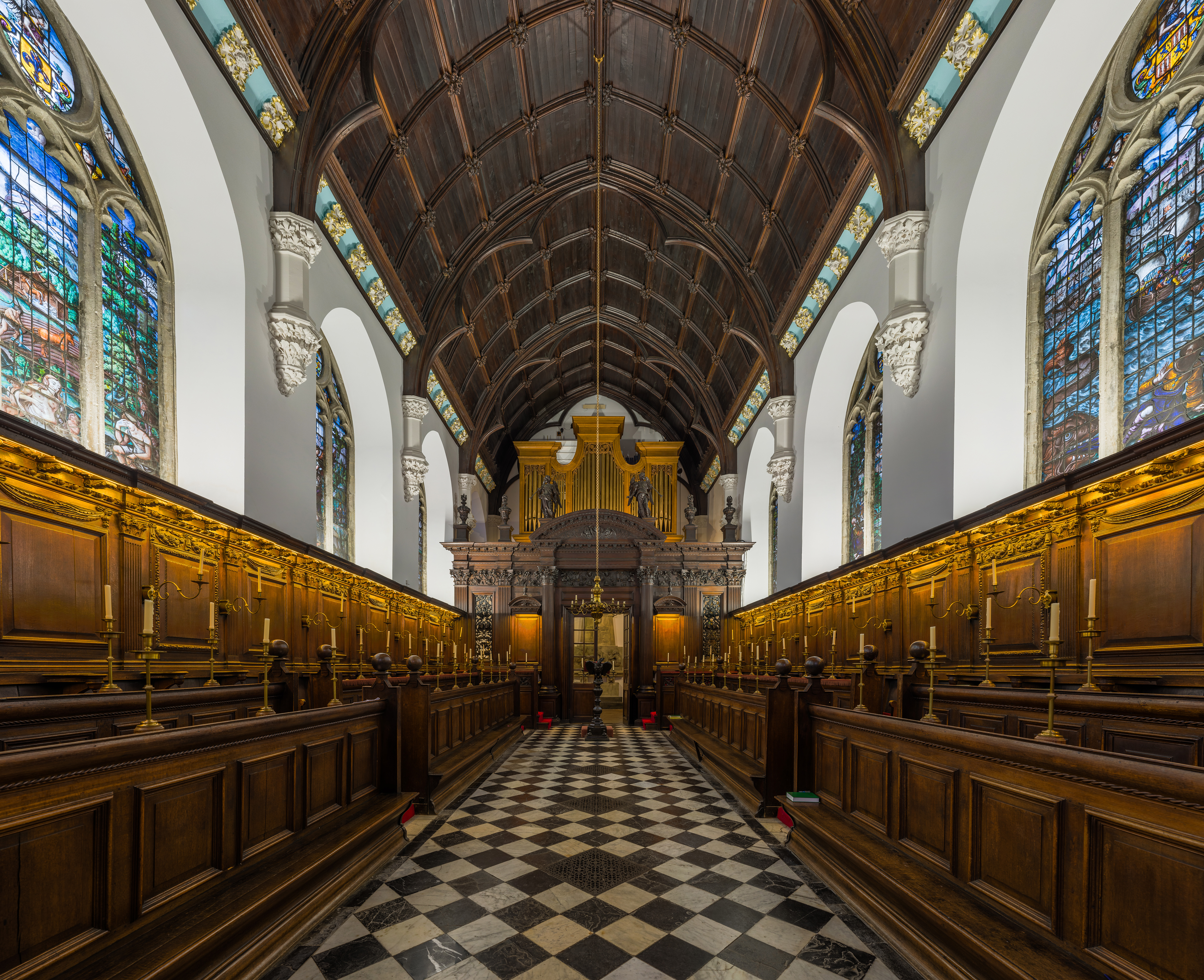
The interior of the chapel of University College, Oxford.

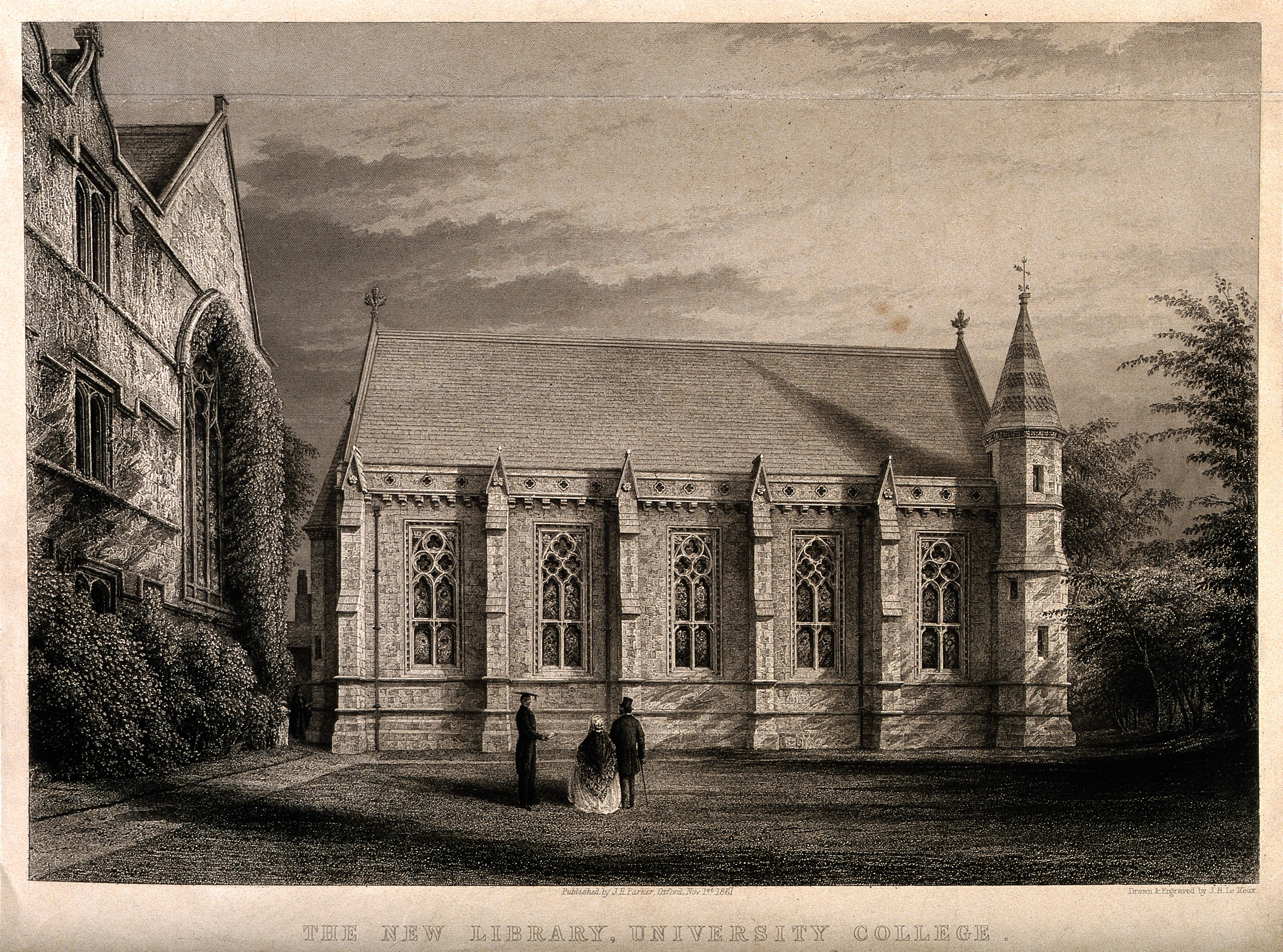
University College, Oxford: the library. Line engraving by J.H. Le Keux, 1861, after himself.

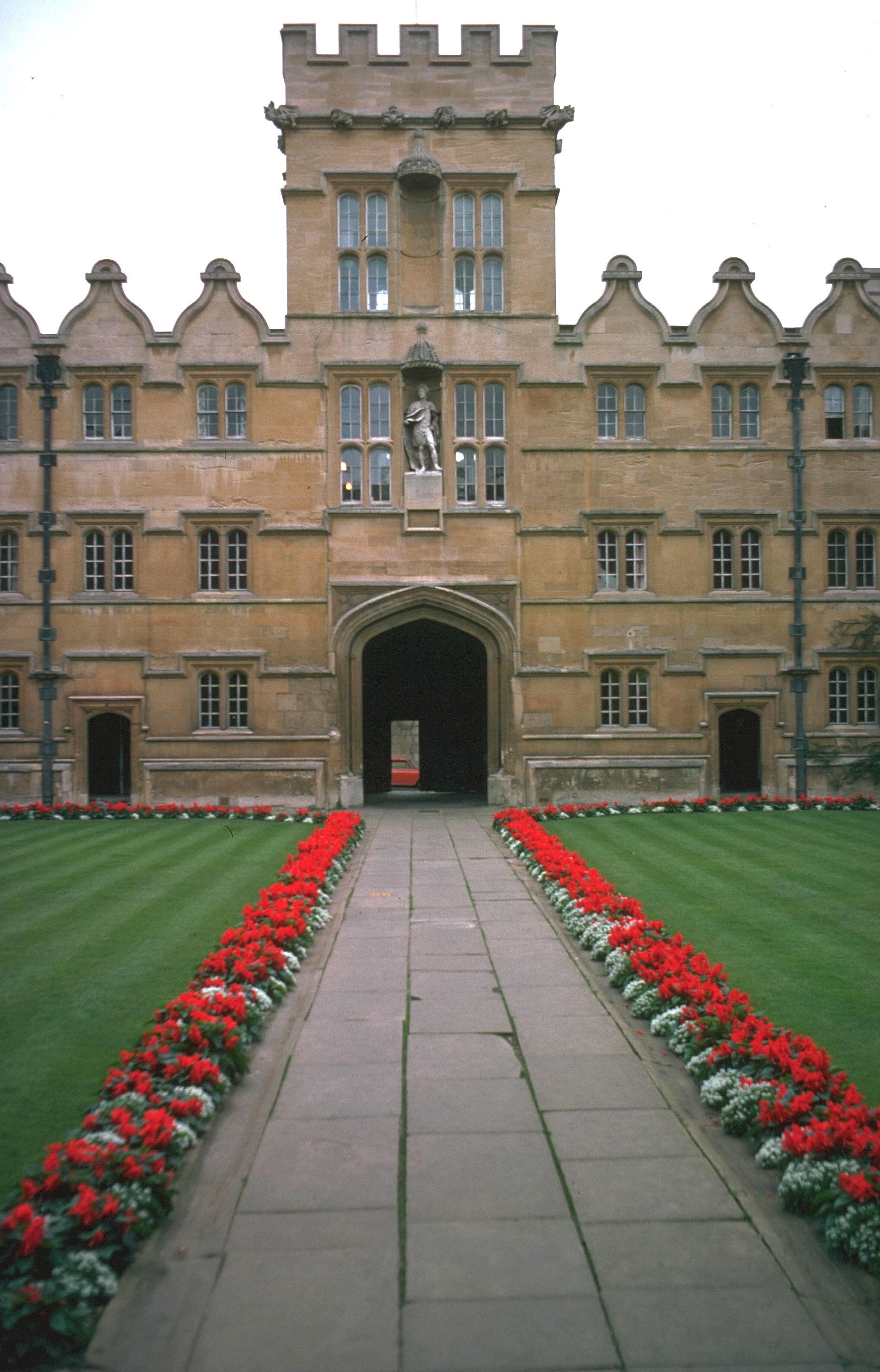
The Main Quad of University College Oxford.

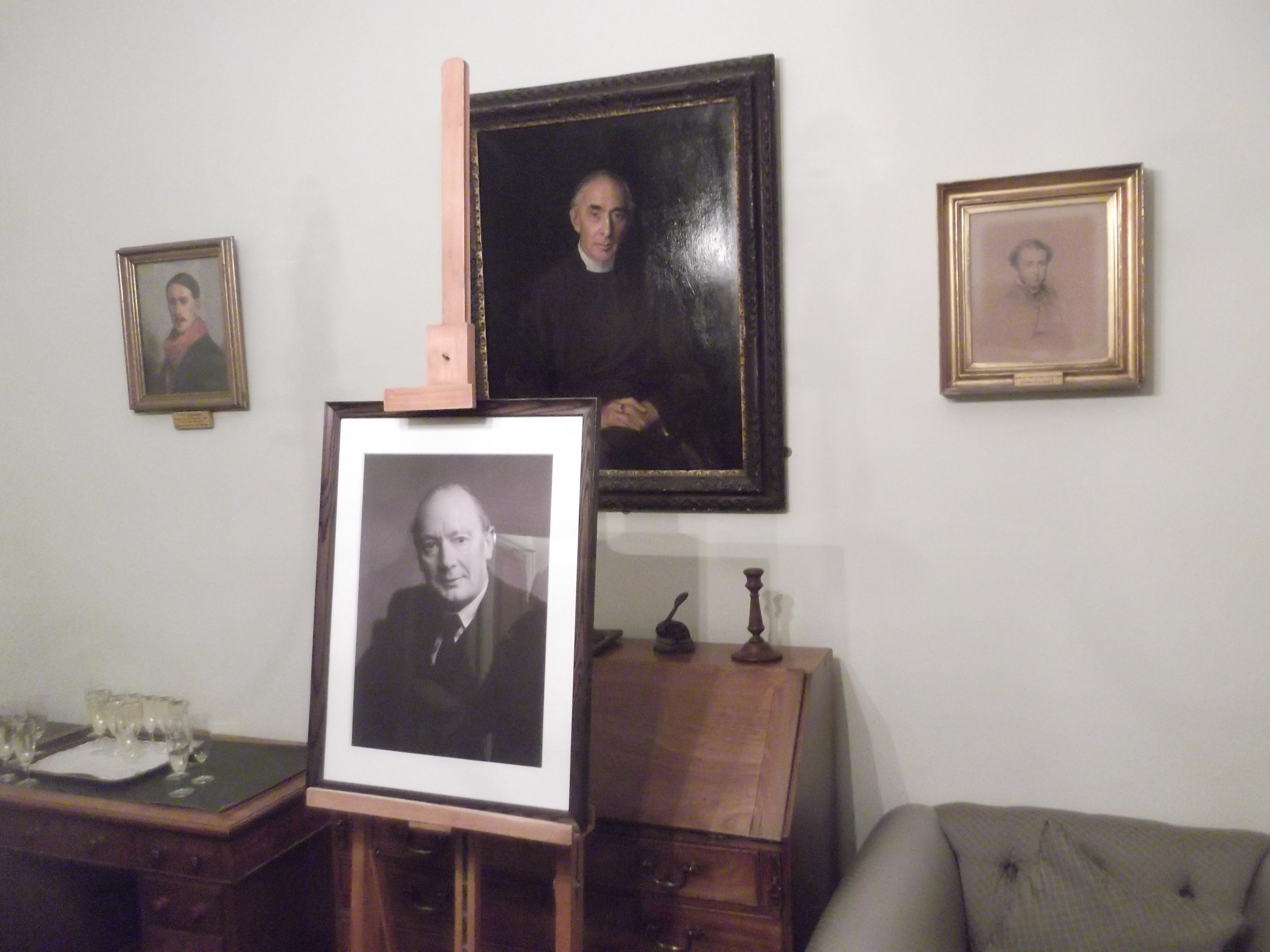
Dr Bowen's Room, University College, Oxford.

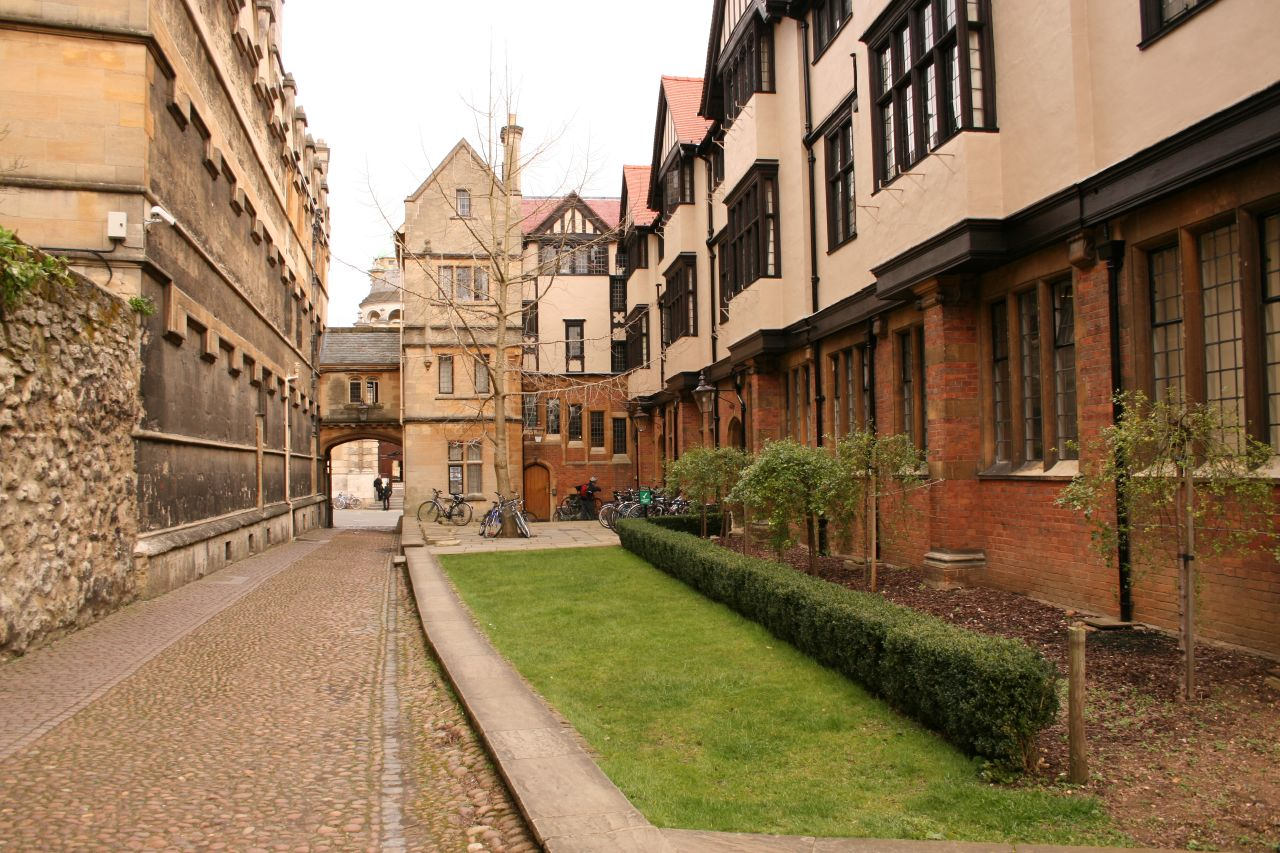
A view of Logic Lane toward the High Street from within University College, Oxford.

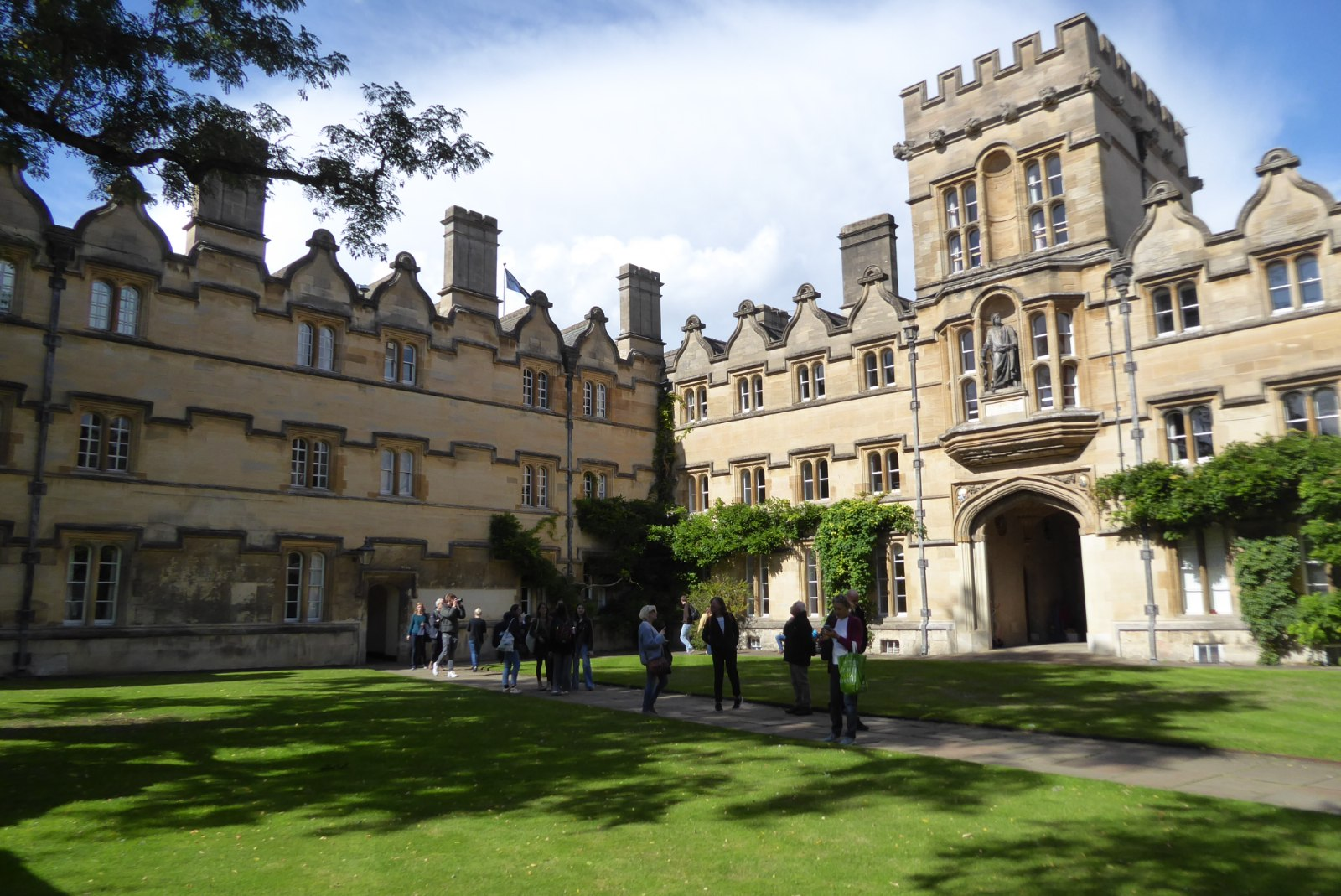
Radcliffe Quadrangle, University College Oxford

== See also ==
- University College Players (college dramatic society)
