= University College Boathouse =

Boathouse in Oxford, England

Coordinates: 51.7421°N 1.2497°W

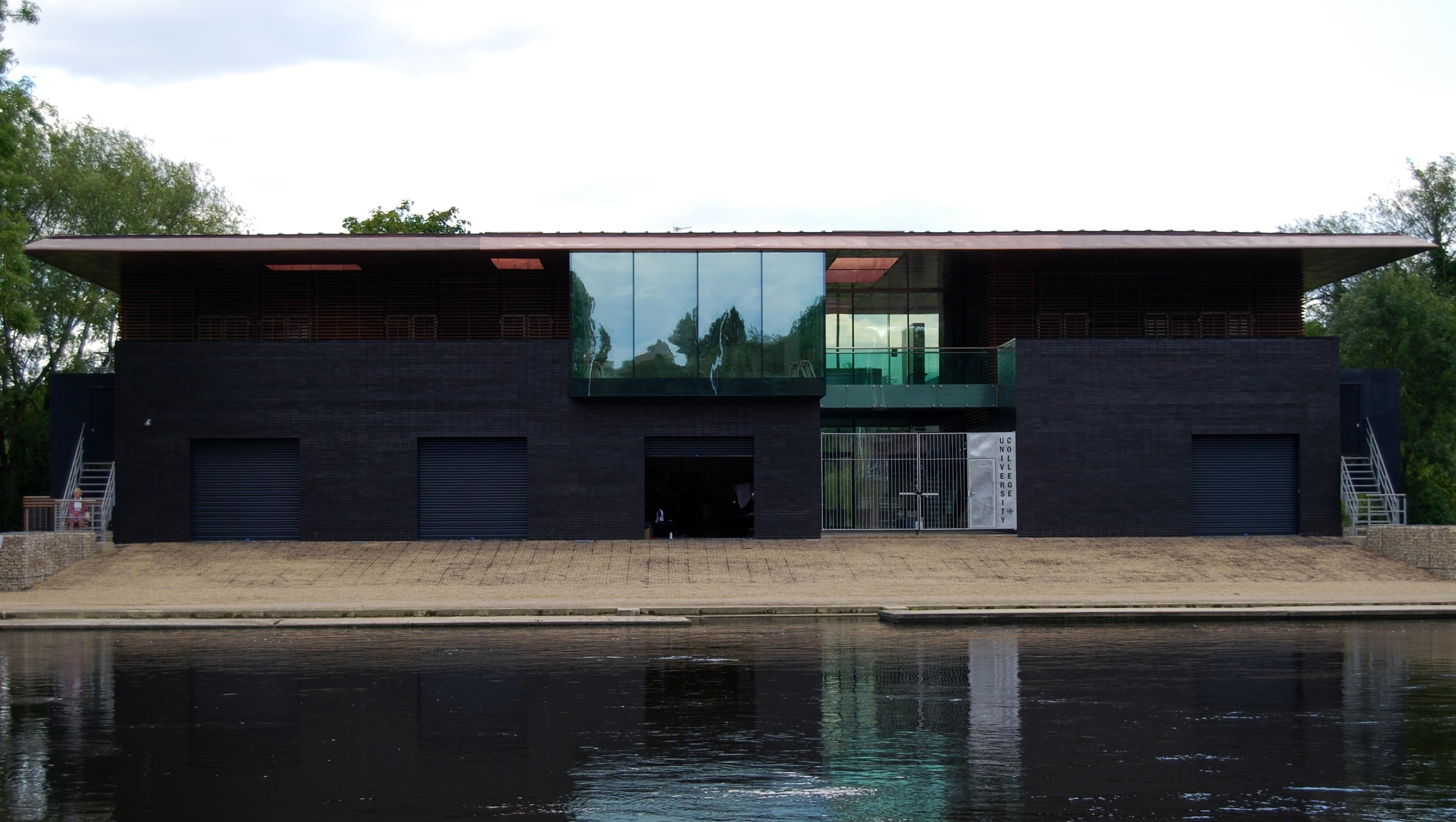
- View from the Isis
- Interactive map of the University College Boathouse area

General information
- Type: Boathouse
- Location: Oxford
- Opened: 2007
- Cost: £2.7 million
- Owner: University College

Design and construction
- Architecture firm: Belsize Architects

University College Boathouse is the boathouse of University College Boat Club (UCBC) on the southern bank of the River Thames (locally known as "The Isis") in Oxford, England. It is owned by University College, Oxford. UCBC's Boathouse has become a recognisable architectural statement in and around Oxford. The boathouse is shared with Wolfson, St Peter's and Somerville College boat clubs.

The original 19th-century boathouse, designed by John Oldrid Scott, was destroyed through arson in 1999. After eight years, a new boathouse designed by Belsize Architects was completed in 2007 at a cost of £2.7 million. The Boathouse was awarded a Royal Institute of British Architects (RIBA) prize, and has enjoyed a very favourable reception in the architectural world. An article describes the structure as not just a boathouse, but "a grandstand of the first order" arguing that it represents a new age in rowing.

The Saturday of Eights Week, the main summer rowing event of Oxford University, in 2007 saw the opening of the new boathouse by then-Chairman of the British Olympic Association Colin Moynihan, who had coxed for University College and Oxford University, and won a silver medal at the 1980 Moscow Olympics. At the same ceremony, the Coleman Viewing Terrace was named to remember the benefactors Jimmy and Jamie Coleman.
