= Edward Strother =

English medical writer and physician

- Born: Northumberland
- Occupations: Medical writer and physician

Edward Strother (died 14 April 1737) was an English medical writer and physician.

== Biography ==
Strother born in Northumberland. He was perhaps son of Edward Strother, who was admitted an extra-licentiate of the Royal College of Physicians on 1 October 1700 and afterwards practised at Alnwick. On 8 May 1720, he graduated M.D. at the university of Utrecht, and on 3 April 1721 he was admitted a licentiate of the College of Physicians. He died on 14 April 1737, at his house near Soho Square.

He was the author of:

- ‘A Critical Essay on Fevers,’ London, 1716, 8vo.
- ‘Evodia, or a Discourse of Causes and Cures,’ London, 1718, 8vo.
- ‘Pharmacopœia Practica,’ London, 1719, 12mo.
- ‘D. M. I. de Vi Cordis Motrice,’ Utrecht, 1720, 4to.
- ‘Experienced Measures how to manage the Small-pox,’ London, 1721, 8vo.
- ‘Syllabus Prælectionum Pharmaco-logicarum et Medico-practicarum,’ London, 1724, 4to.
- ‘An Essay on Sickness and Health,’ London, 1725, 8vo.
- ‘Practical Observations on the Epidemical Fever,’ London, 1729, 8vo.

Some observations by Strother are also prefixed to John Radcliffe ‘Pharmacopœia,’ London, 1716, 12mo; and he translated Harman's ‘Materia Medica,’ London, 1727, 8vo.
