= Christian Cole (barrister) =

Sierra Leonean barrister; first black graduate of Oxford University

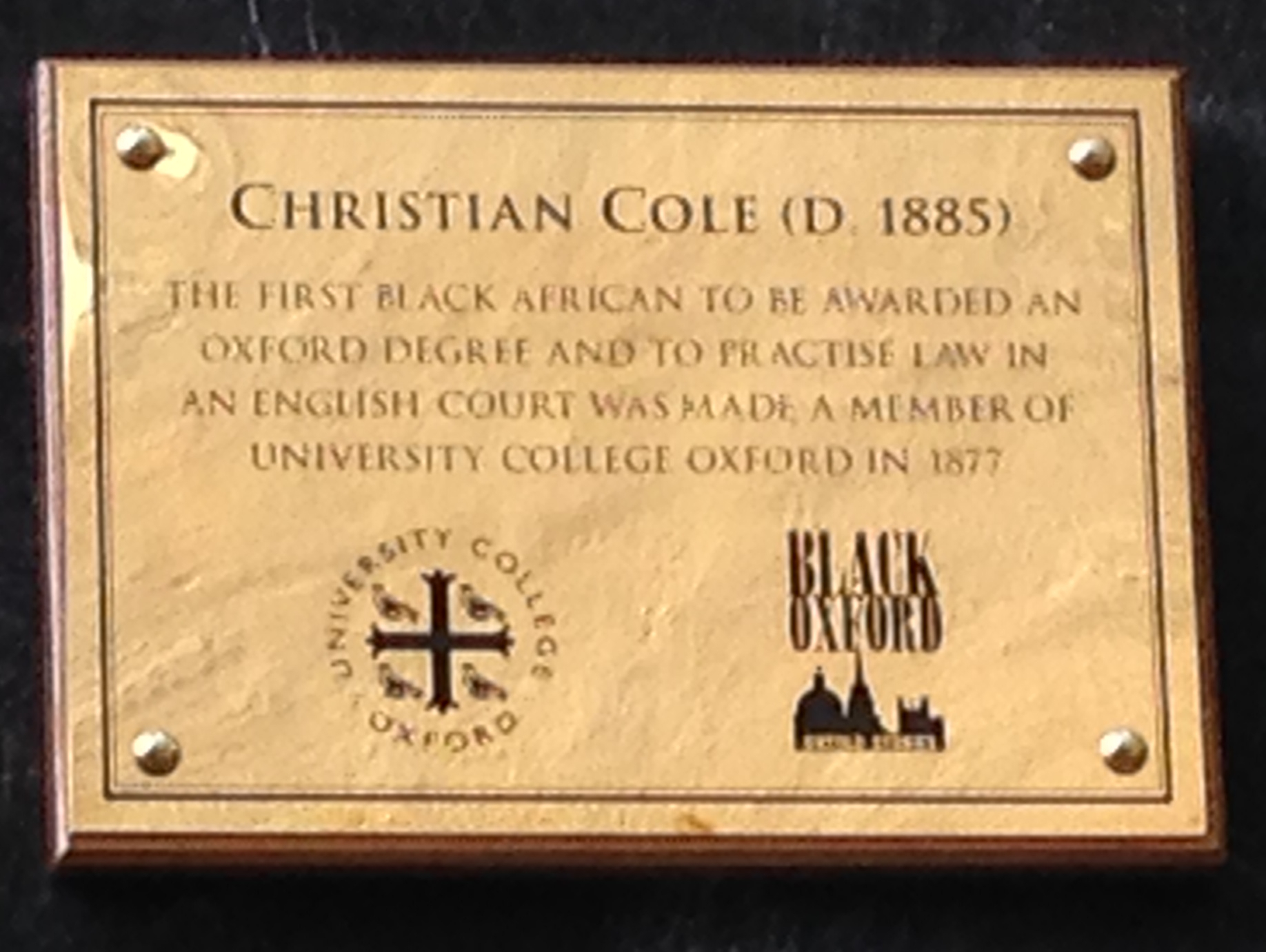
The plaque commemorating Christian Cole in Logic Lane

Christian Frederick Cole (1852 – 1885) was a Sierra Leone Creole lawyer and the first black African barrister to practise in the English courts. Originally from the Sierra Leone Colony and Protectorate, he was the first black graduate of the University of Oxford, where he studied as a non-collegiate student and then at University College.

== Life ==
Cole was the grandson of a slave, and the adopted son of Reverend James Cole of Waterloo. Prior to his studies at Oxford he was educated at Fourah Bay College in Freetown, Sierra Leone.

He enrolled at Oxford as a non-collegiate student with the Delegacy of Unattached Students (now St Catherine's College) in 1873, studying classics. His student contemporaries included the imperialist Cecil Rhodes and the author Oscar Wilde.

Short of money, Cole paid his way by teaching Responsions, one of the qualifying exams for Oxford degrees, and his classes were reportedly popular. He also taught music lessons: a racist cartoon of the time depicts him playing a banjo; however, he actually played and taught the piano. Cole's popularity at the college is indicated by the fact that when his uncle died and his financial situation worsened, fellow students and the then Master of University College, George Bradley, raised money to help him.

Despite his financial problems and the disadvantages of being unattached to a college, he graduated in 1876 with a fourth-class honours degree and in November of that year was accepted as a member of University College, a position he held until April 1880. His presence drew a lot of attention, including press cartoons depicting him with racial stereotypes. His feelings about these reactions are suggested by his anti-racist writings. He still took a very visible role in the life of the college, including speaking at the Oxford Union. According to biographer Michèle Mendelssohn, the American abolitionist Col. Thomas Wentworth Higginson saw Cole at Oxford and described him as “a very black youth from Africa” in a B.A. gown. "King Cole" was the name that Higginson heard the undergraduates call him.

On leaving Oxford in 1880, he returned to Sierra Leone, but did not find employment, so returned to England to train as a barrister. He was accepted by the Inner Temple in 1883, thus becoming the first black African practising in English courts. He later went to Zanzibar to continue his career in law.

He died of smallpox in 1885, at the age of 33. Pamela Roberts, founder and director of Black Oxford Untold Stories, brought Christian Cole to the attention the Master of University College, Ivor Crewe, and of the College's governing body with the aim of putting up a plaque to honour Cole's achievements. On 14 October 2017, Roberts and Crewe unveiled a plaque to Cole on University College's exterior wall, in Logic Lane, opposite the college’s law library.

== Written works ==
Cole delivered lectures on education in Freetown, which were published in 1880.

In 1879, Cole published two pamphlets. One was "What Do Men Say about Negroes?", a response to F. E. Weatherly's book Oxford Days, priced 3d and dedicated to Edward Blyden. The other contained his thoughts on the Anglo-Zulu war and was titled Reflections on the Zulu War, By a Negro, BA., of University College, Oxford, and the Inner Temple. In the latter, he wrote:

Ye white men of England
Oh tell, tell, I pray,
If the curse of your land,
Is not, day after day,
To increase your possessions
With reckless delight,
To subdue many nations,
And show them your might.

In 2006, a copy of this pamphlet, which includes two poems, was put up for sale. Former students and staff of University College donated more than a thousand pounds to buy it for the college's library.
