= Belsize Architects =

British architectural firm

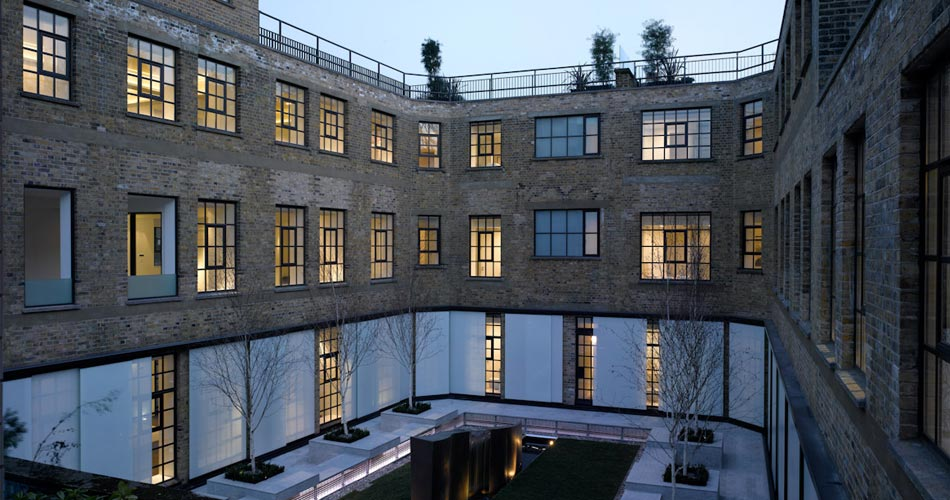
- The Brassworks
- Founder: Shahriar Nasser
- Website: belsizearchitects.com

Belsize Architects are a British architectural practice based in North London, UK.

== Works ==
Belsize Architects have completed buildings in a number of different sectors, ranging from commercial to residential. Notably, the practice has been commissioned to design new student accommodation for the University College, Oxford, after having previously completed the University College Boathouse for the institution, a project which won a Royal Institute of British Architects (RIBA) Award in 2008.

Previous projects include: Klippan House in Hampstead, London (originally known as 'Thwaitehead') – a large Victorian Grade II listed building originally designed and lived in by Ewan Christian. The practice's conversion of The Brassworks, a former Boosey and Hawkes musical instrument factory, into apartments for the Church Commissioners, was shortlisted for a RIBA Award in 2013.

Belsize Architects have also worked for the London School of Economics and completed a contemporary extension to a John Nash designed house in Regent's Park, London.
