= Logic Lane =

Cobbled lane in Oxford, England

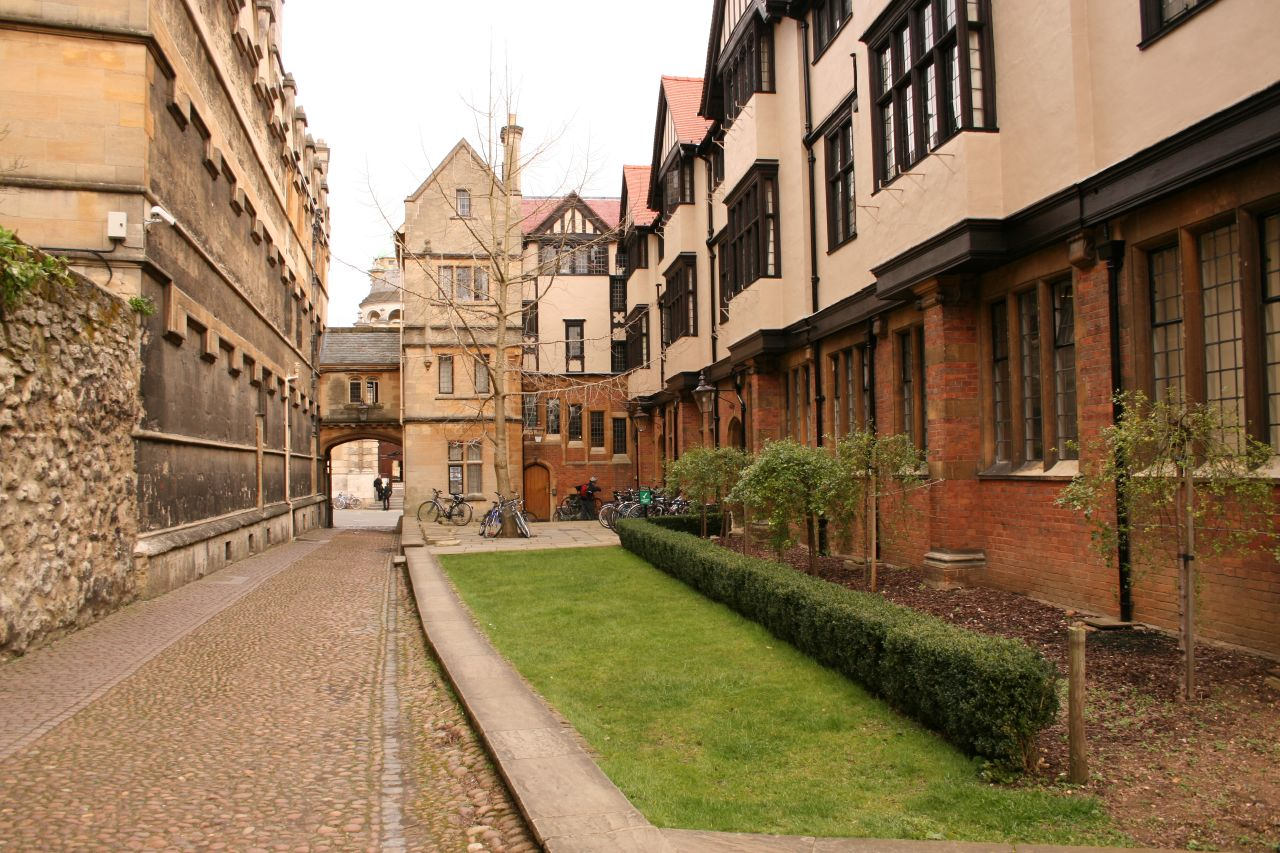
- Logic Lane looking towards the High Street, with the Durham Buildings on the right

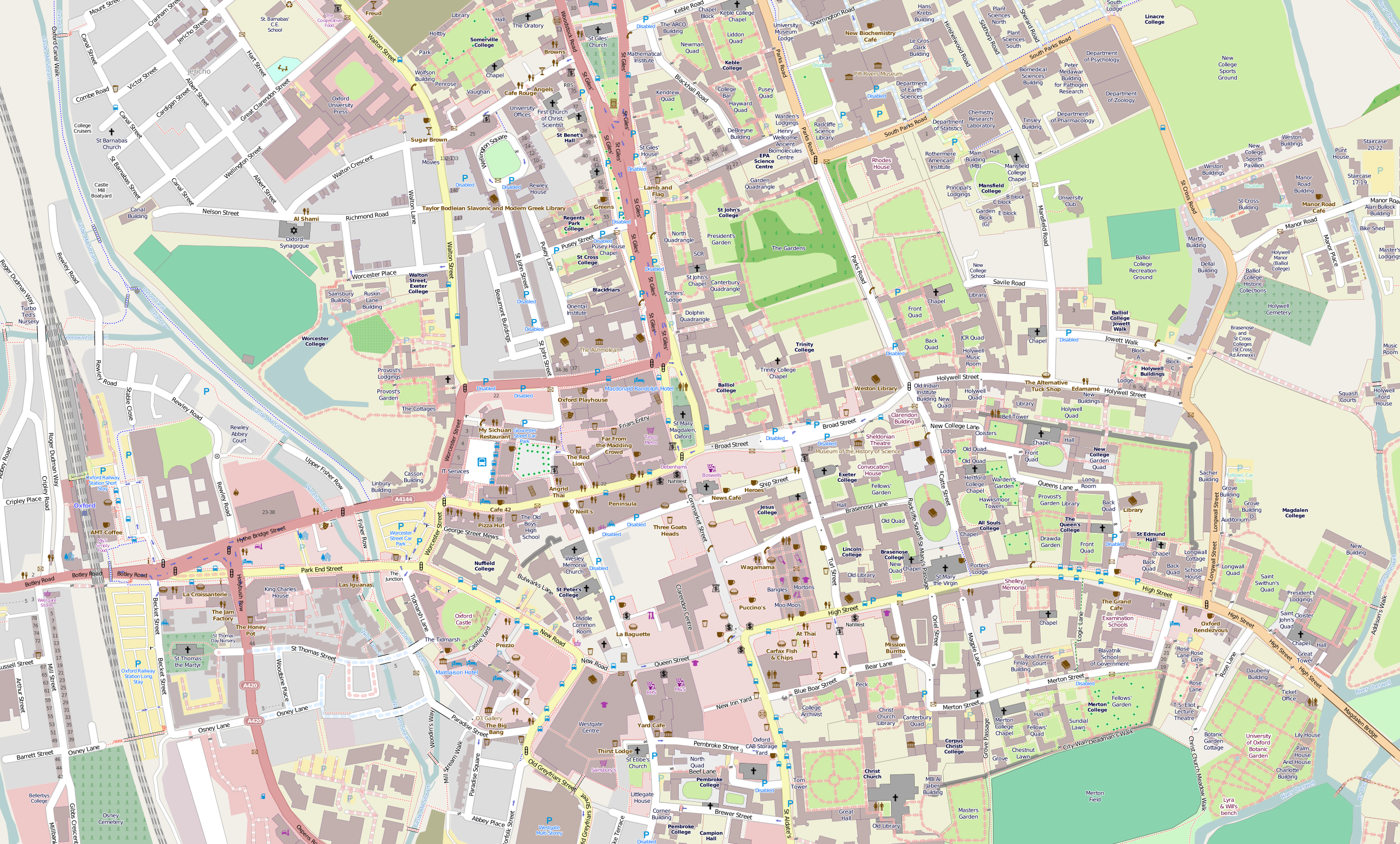
- Location within Oxford
- Former names: Horseman Lane, Horsemull Lane
- Location: Oxford, United Kingdom
- Postal code: OX1
- Coordinates: 51.7521°N 1.25115°W
- North end: High Street, Oxford
- South end: Merton Street

Logic Lane is a small historic cobbled lane that runs through University College in Oxford, England, so called because it was the location of a school of logicians.

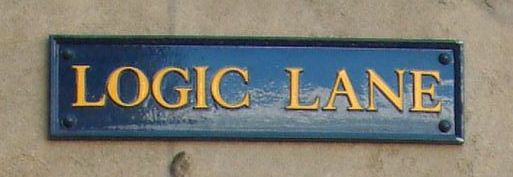
Logic Lane sign, off the High Street

The lane links the High Street at the front of the college with Merton Street to the rear, which is also cobbled. Logic Lane covered bridge is a short covered bridge over the lane at the High Street end. To the west of the lane are the Radcliffe Quad and the Master's Lodgings. To the east are the 1903 Durham Buildings (on the High Street) and the Goodhart Quad. The lane is locked at night (usually at a time earlier than that advertised on the signs at either end of the lane), with gates at each end. It is mainly used by pedestrians, but vehicular access is possible.

== History ==
Logic Lane was formerly known as Lawdenyslanesine and then Horseman Lane in the 13th and 14th centuries. During the medieval period, a horse mill was located here. It was also known as Horsemull Lane. The name of Logic Lane was adopted by the 17th century, owing to the presence of a school of logicians at the northern end of the lane. A medieval street used to run across Logic Lane as an extension of the current Kybald Street to the west, but was closed in 1448.

During July and August 1960, an archaeological excavation was undertaken to the east of Logic Lane before the construction of the Goodhart Building. Evidence of Bronze Age ditches were found, as well as Saxon remains.

== Covered bridge ==
In 1904, a covered bridge at the High Street end of the lane was built to link the older part of the college with the then new Durham Buildings. The lane was officially a public bridleway, and the city council opposed the scheme, but the court judgement was in favour of the college.

== Plaque ==
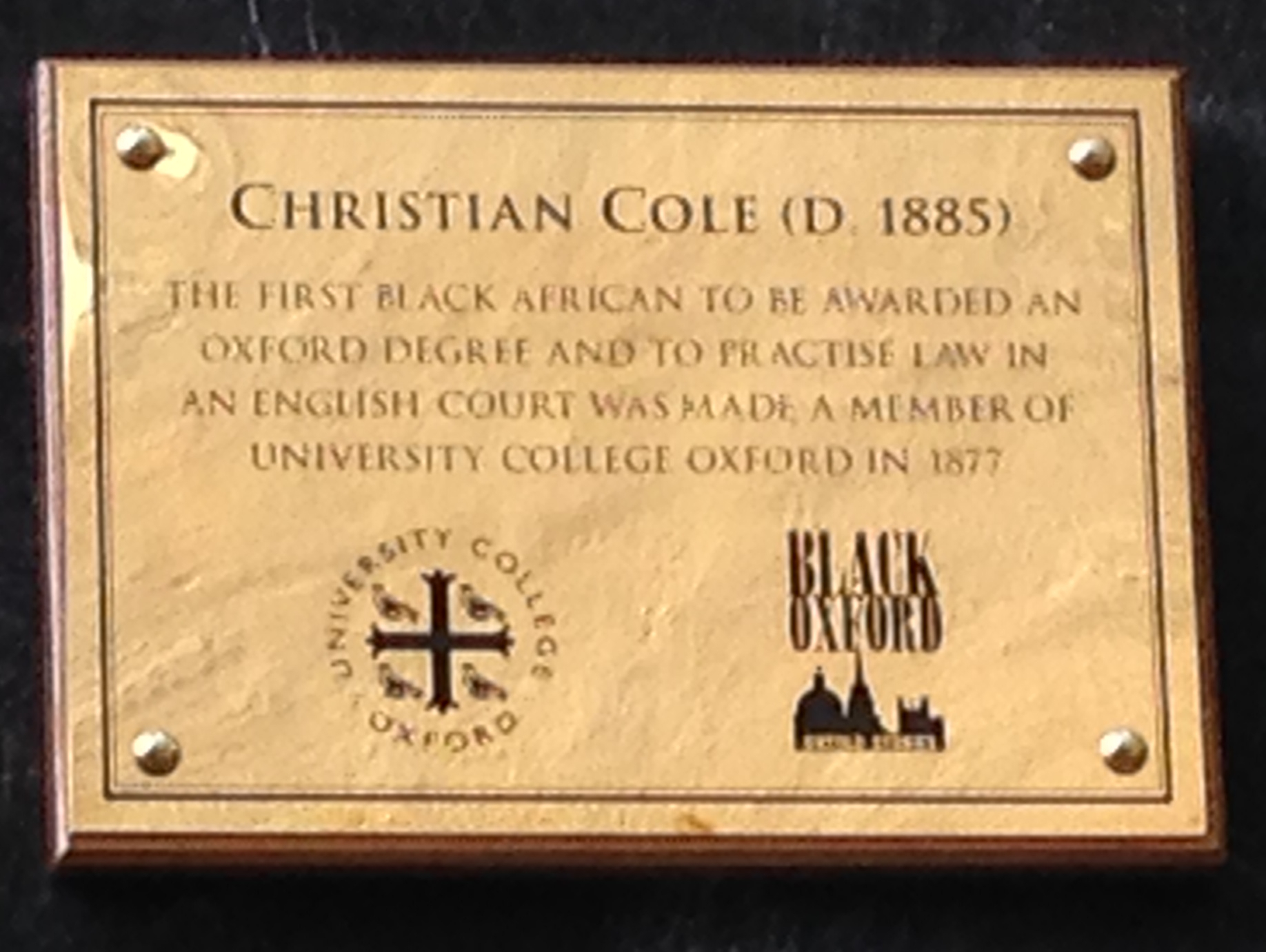
The plaque commemorating Christian Cole in Logic Lane

There is a plaque commemorating Christian Cole (1852–1885) in Logic Lane. Cole was made a member of University College in 1877, supported by the then Master of the college, George Granville Bradley. Cole was originally from the Sierra Leone Colony and Protectorate. He was the first black African to be awarded a degree at Oxford University, and went on to be the first black African barrister to practise in the English law courts.
