= Radcliffe Quadrangle =

Quadrangle of University College, Oxford

Coordinates: 51°45′09″N 1°15′05″W

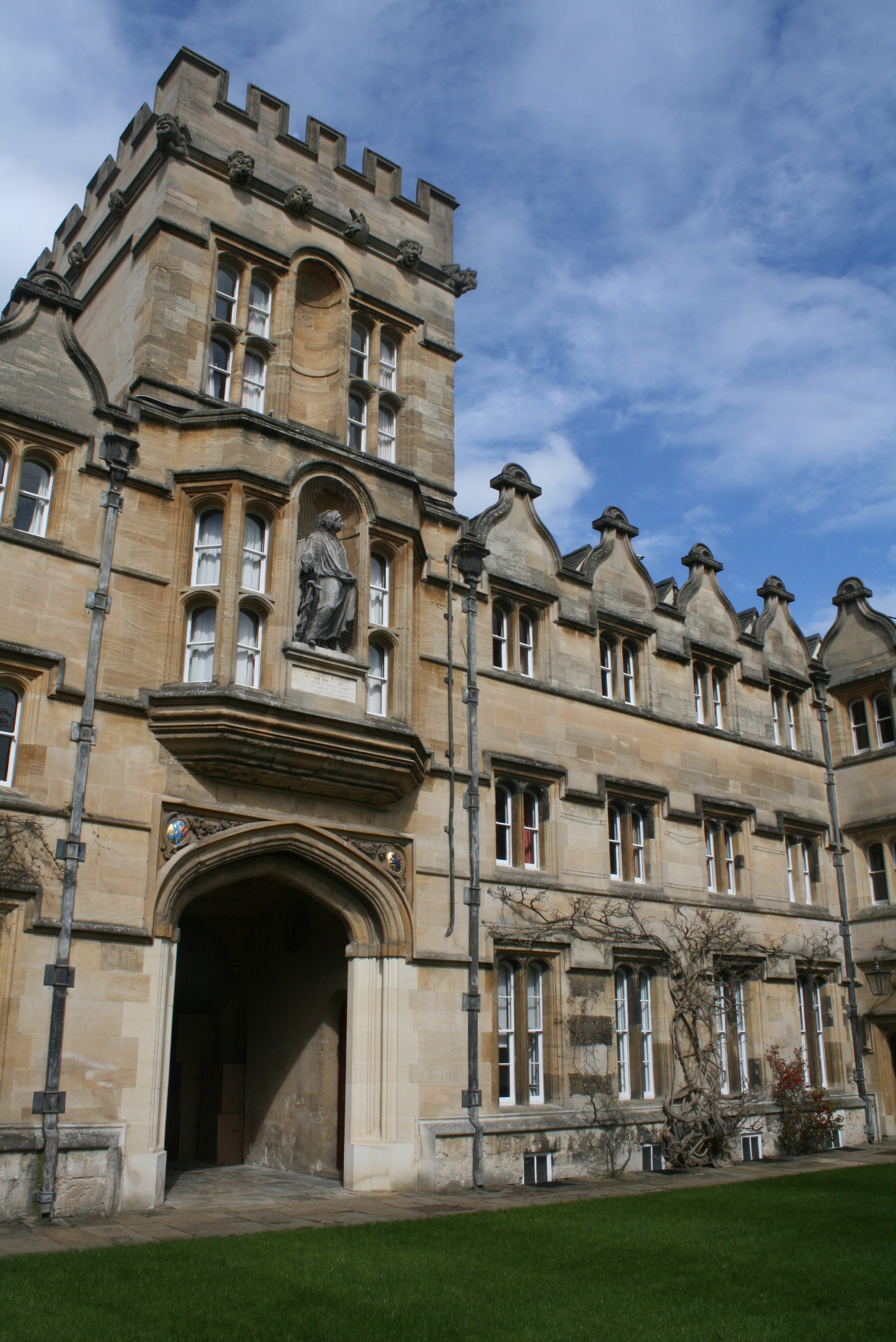
The tower in the Radcliffe Quadrangle at University College, including a statue of John Radcliffe, who left a legacy for the construction of the quadgrangle buildings.

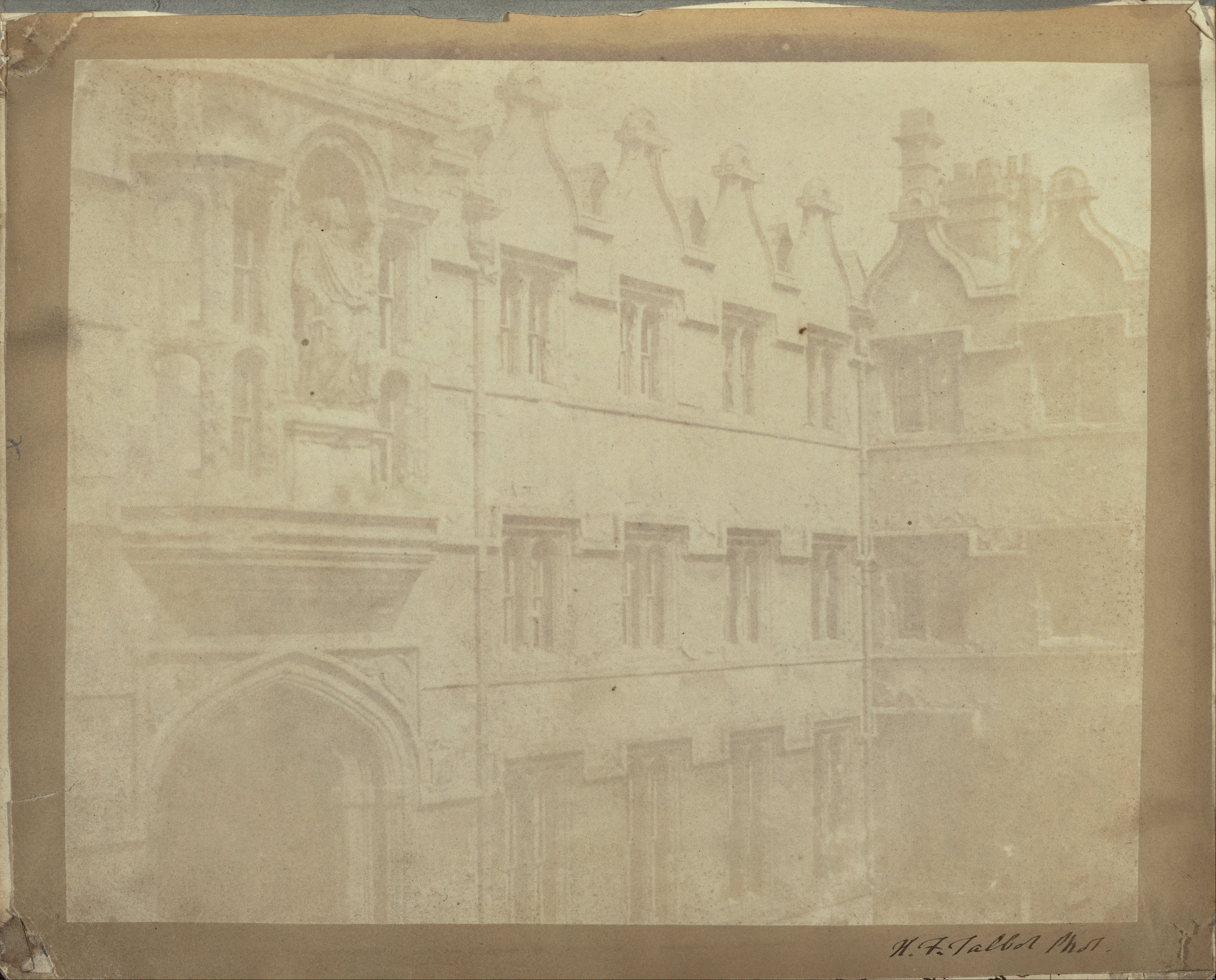
Photograph (1842–4) of the Radcliffe Quadrangle by Henry Fox Talbot.

The Radcliffe Quadrangle (Rad Quad) is the second quadrangle of University College, Oxford, England. The buildings have been Grade I listed since 1954.

The quadrangle was started in 1716 and finished in 1719 with money bequeathed to the college by John Radcliffe, a former student of the college tutored by Obadiah Walker and doctor to the King. Oxford's main hospital and other University buildings are also named after him.

There is a statue of John Radcliffe by Francis Bird on the gate tower of the quad. His coat of arms is also displayed.

The architectural style of the quad matches that of the earlier main quadrangle immediately to the west, although this was by then incredibly old-fashioned for almost a century. It is not a "quadrangle" in the same way as the main quadrangle, because it only has buildings on three sides; the fourth side is bounded by a high stone wall separating the garden of the Master's Lodgings to the south.

To the east is Logic Lane, a small cobbled lane through the college, connecting the High Street at the front of the college and Merton Street at the rear. A covered bridge built in 1903 connects the Radcliffe Quad buildings internally with other buildings on the High Street owned by the college to the east.

The Radcliffe Quad is where University College's matriculation photograph is taken at the start of each academic year. The quad has also been used for celebrations after undergraduate examinations.

== See also ==
- Radcliffe Camera
- Radcliffe Infirmary
- Radcliffe Observatory
- Radcliffe Observatory Quarter
- Radcliffe Science Library
- Radcliffe Square
- John Radcliffe Hospital
