= John Radcliffe (physician, born 1650) =

English physician, academic and politician (1650–1714)

The Right Honourable John Radcliffe
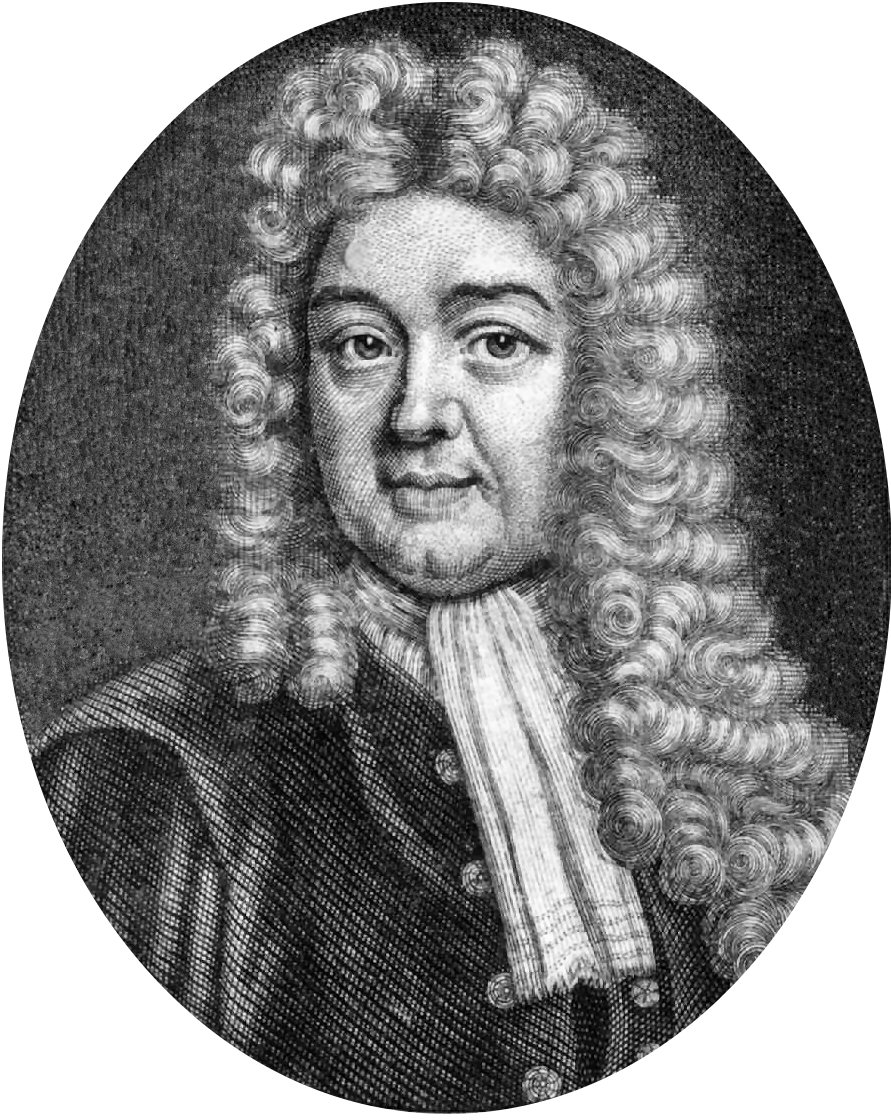

Member of Parliament for Bramber
- In office 20 March 1690 – 11 October 1695
- Monarch: William III
- Preceded by: John Alford
- Succeeded by: Nicholas Barbon with William Stringer

Member of Parliament for Buckingham
- In office 12 November 1713 – 1 November 1714
- Monarch: Anne I
- Preceded by: Thomas Chapman
- Succeeded by: Alexander Denton and Abraham Stanyan

Personal details
- Born: John Radcliffe; 1650 Wakefield, Yorkshire, England
- Died: 1 November 1714 (aged 63–64)
- Party: Tory
- Education: University of Oxford

John Radcliffe (1650 – 1 November 1714) was an English physician, academic and politician. A number of landmark buildings in Oxford, including the Radcliffe Camera (in Radcliffe Square), the Radcliffe Infirmary, the Radcliffe Science Library, Radcliffe Primary Care and the Radcliffe Observatory were named after him. The John Radcliffe Hospital, a large tertiary hospital in Headington, is also named after him.

== Life ==
Radcliffe was born the son of George Radcliffe and Anne Loader, in Wakefield, Yorkshire, where he was baptised on 1 May 1650. He was educated at Queen Elizabeth Grammar School, Wakefield and Northallerton Grammar School and graduated from the University of Oxford, where he was an exhibitioner at University College tutored by Obadiah Walker, to become a Fellow of Lincoln College. He obtained his MD in 1682 and moved to London shortly afterwards. There he enjoyed great popularity and became royal physician to William III and Mary II.

In 1690 he was elected Member of Parliament for Bramber, Sussex and in 1713 member for Buckingham.

On his death in the following year, his property was bequeathed to various charitable causes, including St Bartholomew's Hospital, London and University College, Oxford, where the Radcliffe Quad is named after him. The charitable trust founded by his will of 13 September 1714 still operates as a registered charity.

== Anecdotes of Radcliffe ==
1. Among the many singularities related of Radcliffe, it has been noticed that, when he was in a convivial party, he was unwilling to leave it, even though sent for by persons of the highest distinction. Whilst he was thus deeply engaged at a tavern, he was called on by a grenadier, who desired his immediate attendance on his colonel; but no entreaties could prevail on the physician to postpone his revelry.

"Sir," the soldier was quoted as saying, "my orders are to bring you to the boss." And being a very powerful man, he took him up in his arms, and carried him off per force. He had betrayed his loyal friend. After traversing some dirty lanes, the doctor and his escort arrived at a narrow alley.
"What the Devil is all this," said Radcliffe, "your colonel doesn't live here?"
"No," said his military friend, "my colonel does not live here – but my comrade does, and he's worth two of the colonel, so by God, doctor, if you don't do your best for him, it will be the worst for you!"

2. To confer medical authority upon themselves, doctors of the day often published their theories, clinical findings, and pharmacopoeia (collections of "receipts" or prescriptions). Radcliffe, however, not only wrote little but also took a certain iconoclastic pride in having read little, remarking once of some vials of herbs and a skeleton in his study: “This is Radcliffe’s library.” However, he bequeathed a substantial sum of money to Oxford for the founding of the Radcliffe Library, an endowment which, Samuel Garth quipped, was "about as logical as if a eunuch should found a seraglio."

3. Physician to King William III until 1699, when Radcliffe offended the King by remarking "Why truly, I would not have your Majesty's two legs for your three kingdoms."

== Legacy ==
There are a number of buildings and places named after John Radcliffe.

- Radcliffe Camera, a building of the Bodleian Libraries of the University of Oxford.
- Radcliffe Science Library, a major science library at the University of Oxford
- John Radcliffe Hospital, a major teaching hospital of the Oxford University Hospitals NHS Foundation Trust.
- Radcliffe Infirmary, a former hospital building, currently housing the Faculty of Philosophy and both the Philosophy and Theology libraries of the University of Oxford.
- Radcliffe Observatory, the astronomical observatory of the University of Oxford from 1773 to 1934.
  - Radcliffe Telescope, a replacement observatory built in South Africa, which became operational in 1948.
  - Radcliffe Observatory Quarter, a major University of Oxford, centred on the Observatory.
- Radcliffe Quadrangle, the second quadrangle of University College, Oxford.
- Radcliffe Square, a major public square in Oxford, centred on the Radcliffe Camera.

== Works ==
- Pharmacopoeia Radcliffeana: or, Dr. Radcliff's Prescriptions, Faithfully gather'd from his Original Recipie's To which are annex'd, Useful Observations upon each Prescription. The Second Edition Corrected. . Rivington, London 2nd Ed. by Edward Strother 1716 Free EBook digitized by Google
- Pharmacopoeiae Radcliffeanae Pars Altera: Or, The Second and Last Part of Dr. Radcliff's Prescriptions, with useful Observations, &c. To which is annex'd, An Appendix, Containing a Body of Prescriptions, answering the Intentions requir'd in all Diseases Internal and External, with useful Cautions subjoin'd to each Head, and a complete Index to the Whole. Being a Work of General Use to all Physicians, Apothecaries, and Surgeons. . Rivington, London. by Edward Strother 1716 Free EBook digitized by Google
- Dr. Radcliffe's practical dispensatory : containing a complete body of prescriptions, fitted for all diseases, internal and external, digested under proper heads . Rivington, London 4th Ed. by Edward Strother 1721 Digital edition by the University and State Library Düsseldorf

Parliament of England
Preceded by John Alford	Member of Parliament for Bramber; With: Nicholas Barbon 1690–1695	Succeeded by Nicholas Barbon with William Stringer 1695–1698

Parliament of Great Britain
Preceded by Sir Richard Temple, 4th Bt; Thomas Chapman	Member of Parliament for Buckingham; 1713–1714; With: Thomas Chapman	Succeeded by Alexander Denton; Abraham Stanyan
