= Logic Lane covered bridge =

Coordinates: 51.75253°N 1.25111°W

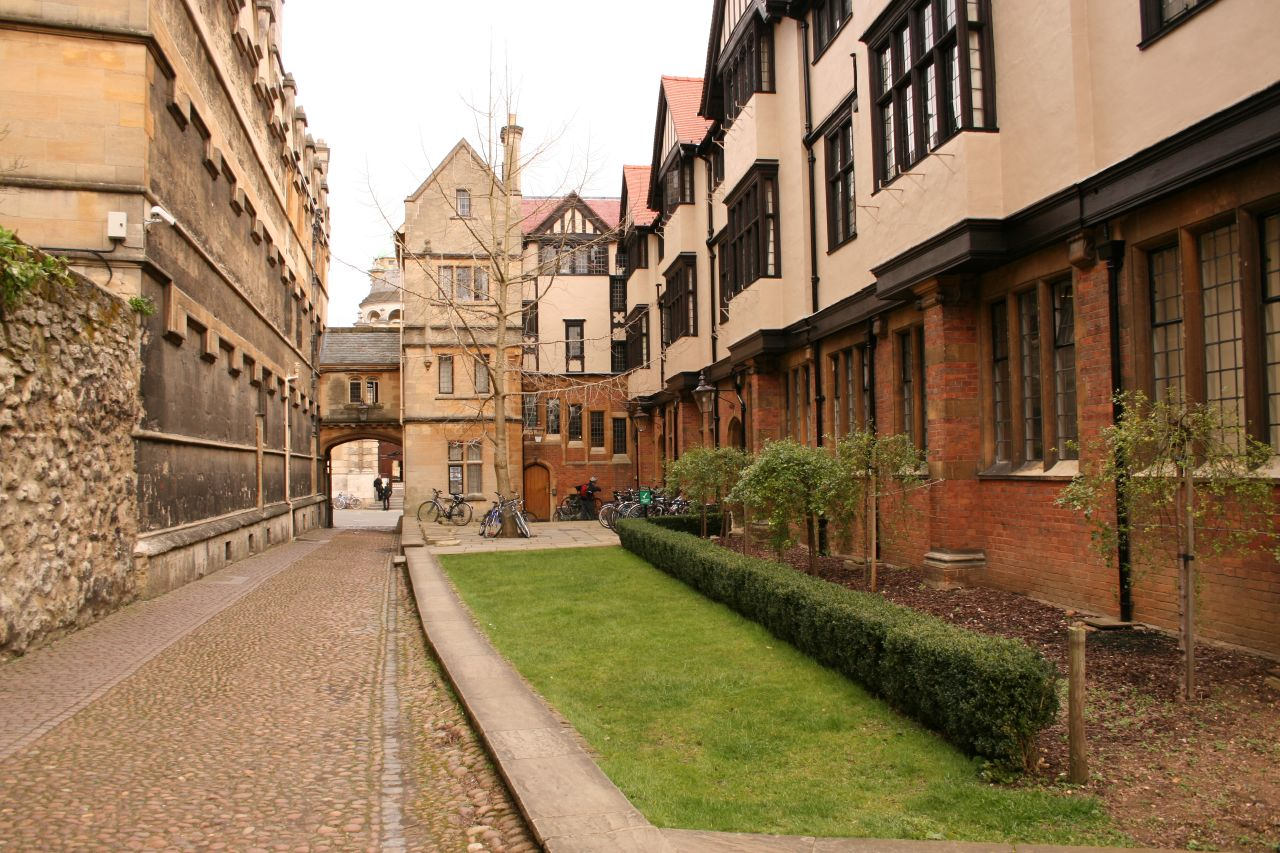
The covered bridge can be seen at the end of Logic Lane

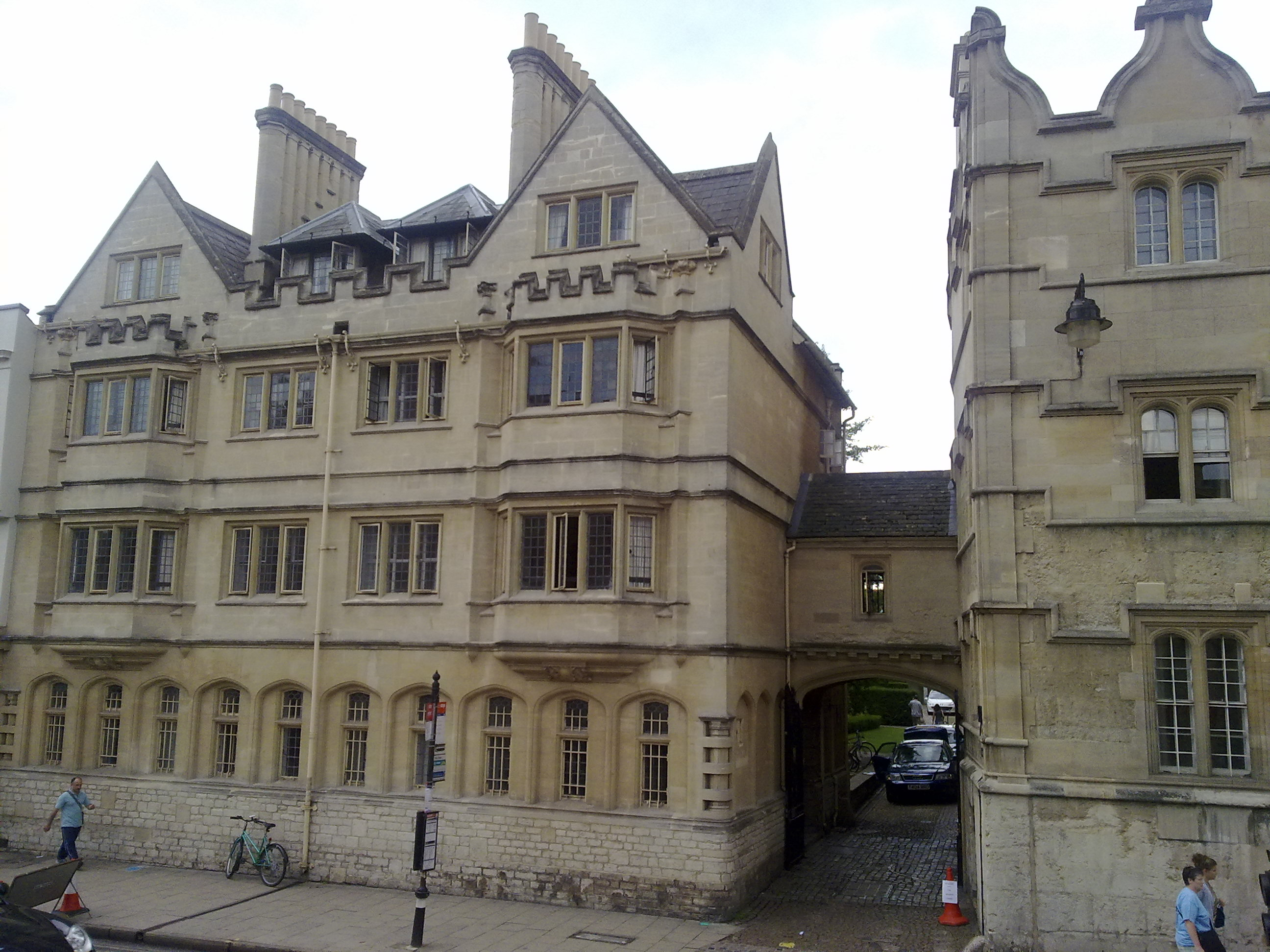
The Logic Lane covered bridge from the High Street

Location of Logic Lane covered bridge within central Oxford

The Logic Lane covered bridge is a small covered bridge at the High Street end of Logic Lane, within University College, Oxford, England.

The bridge was designed by the Oxford architect Harry Wilkinson Moore (1850–1915) and was completed in 1904. It links the older Radcliffe Quad buildings with the newer Durham Buildings, built in 1903. Oxford City Council was against the scheme, since Logic Lane was officially a bridleway, but the court judged in favour of the college—so the bridge was built.

== See also ==
- Bridge of Sighs, another better-known covered bridge in Oxford at Hertford College.
- Bridge of Sighs, Cambridge
