= Anglesey Abbey =

Country house in Cambridgeshire, England

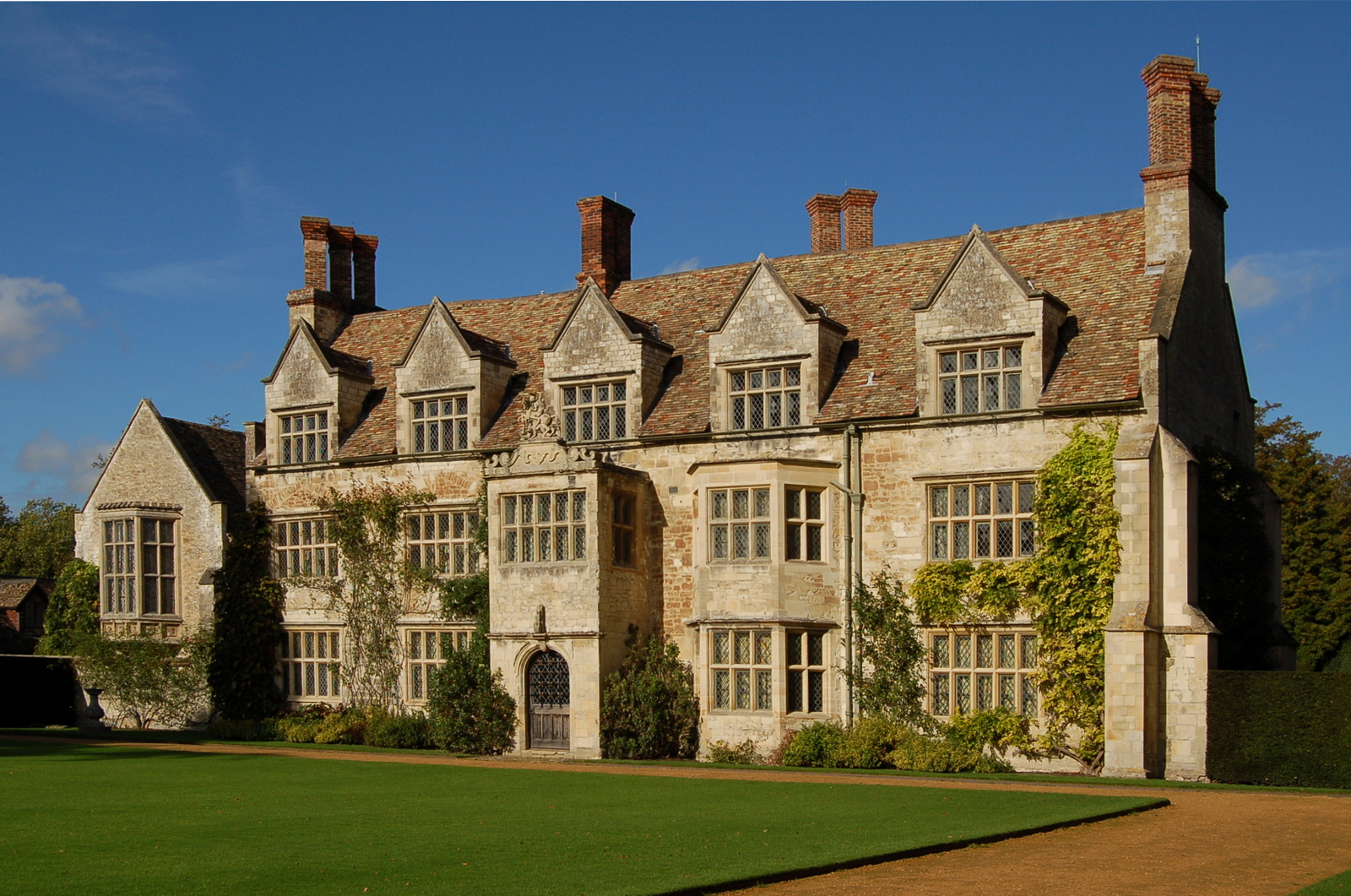
- South facing front of the house.

- Location within Cambridgeshire

General information
- Location: Lode, Lode, England
- Coordinates: 52.237°N 0.24°E
- Elevation: 5m

Website
- https://www.nationaltrust.org.uk/visit/cambridgeshire/anglesey-abbey-gardens-and-lode-mill

Anglesey Abbey is a National Trust property in the village of Lode, 5 1/2 miles (8.9 km) northeast of Cambridge, England. The property includes a country house, built on the remains of a priory, 98 acres (400,000 m^{2}) of gardens and landscaped grounds, and a working mill.

The priory was closed in 1536 during the dissolution of the monasteries and a Jacobean-style house was built on the site of the ruins in about 1600. Owners down the centuries included Thomas Hobson and his Parker descendants, and three local clergymen. The last private owner was Lord Fairhaven who lived in the house from 1926 until he died in 1966. He made extensive additions to the house to accommodate his collection of furniture, art, books and objets d'art and landscaped the grounds. On his death, he left the house and its contents to the National Trust.

== History ==
Anglesey Abbey was built on the remains of a priory of Augustinian Canons regular, which was founded as a hospital of St Mary during the reign of Henry I (i.e., between 1100 and 1135) and endowed as a priory by Richard de Clare in 1212. The priory was closed in 1536 during the dissolution of the monasteries. Three years later it was granted to a lawyer, John Hynde. The priory was largely demolished and materials used in the construction of Madingley Hall.

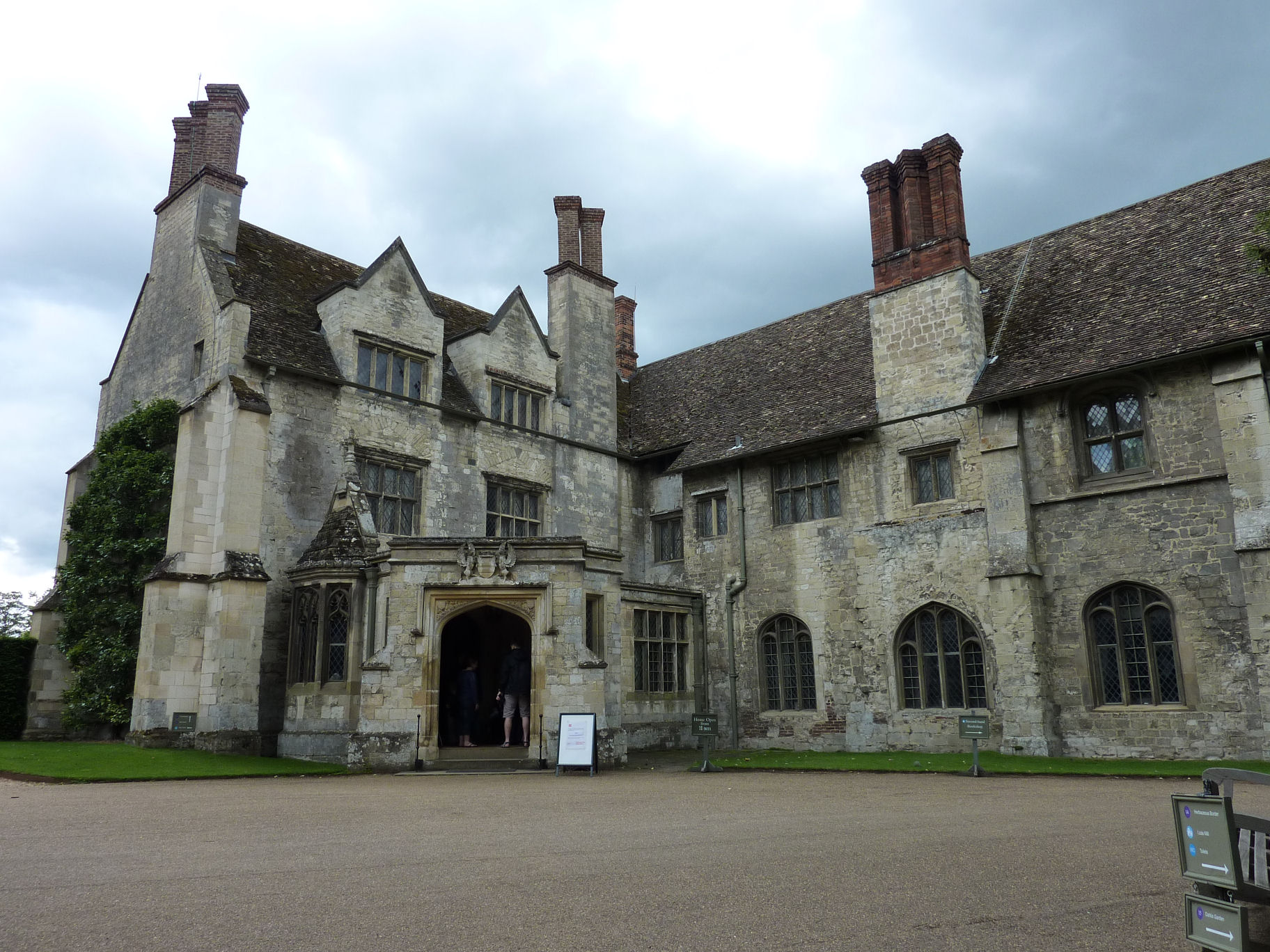
Visitor entrance at rear of house, with dining room on the right showing old masonry

The Fowkes family acquired the property in 1595 and converted what remained of the demolished priory into a Jacobean-style house. The walls of the chapter house were incorporated into the main part of the domestic dwelling, with the calefactory or monks' day room to the north left as an outbuilding. Subsequent owners included the Cambridge carrier Thomas Hobson (of "Hobson's Choice"), his son-in-law barrister Thomas Parker and descendants, Cambridgeshire MP Samuel Shepheard and his daughter Lady Irvine, and George Leonard Jenyns. Owners did not always occupy the house themselves; it was leased out as a farmhouse at times. By the time Thomas Parker died in 1643 the property was known as Anglesey Abbey, rather than Priory.

In 1848 Reverend John Hailstone, vicar of the neighbouring parish of Bottisham, son of botanist Samuel Hailstone and nephew of a geologist John Hailstone, purchased Anglesey Abbey and carried out restorations, converting the monks' day room into an entrance hall, adding a service wing and building a stable block from remaining medieval masonry. Several sketches he made of the house survive. He was also responsible for planting trees, including cedars, wellingtonia, weeping elm and silver lime, along the drive to the house. Reverend Hailstone lived in the house after his resignation as vicar of Bottisham in 1861 until he died in 1877. His widow sold it in 1888 to the Reverend James George Clark, who lived there with his family until 1912, when he was given a living in Hertfordshire and tenants were found for Anglesey Abbey.

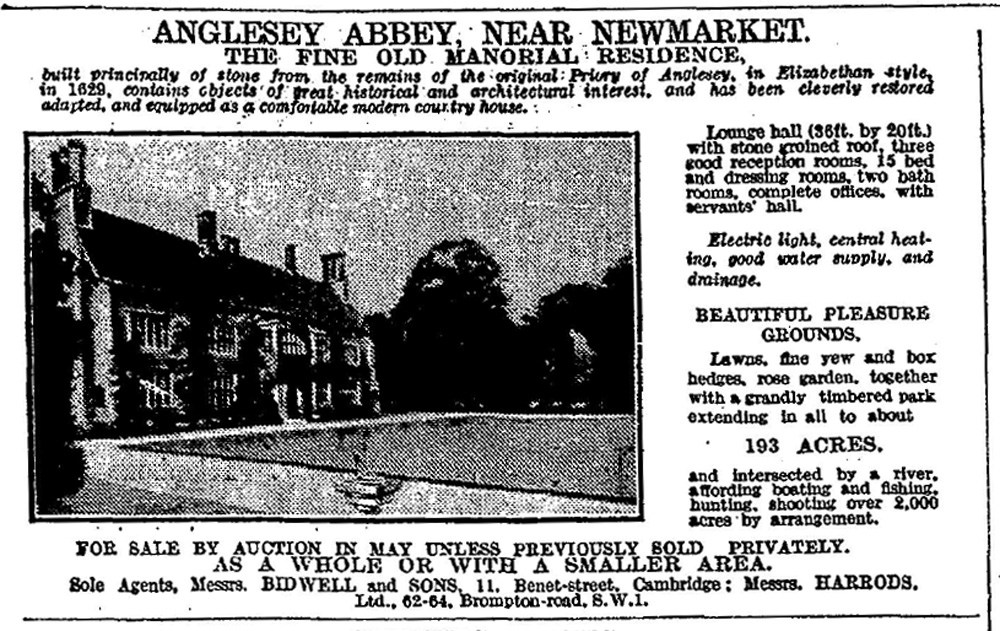
Advertisement for sale of Anglesey Abbey in 1926.

Anglesey Abbey was sold in 1926 to two brothers, Urban Huttleston Broughton (later 1st Baron Fairhaven) and Henry Rogers Broughton, who purchased it for its proximity to the horse-racing town of Newmarket and their stud at Great Barton near Bury St Edmunds. The brothers had inherited a fortune from their maternal grandfather, an American oil baron Henry Huttleston Rogers, and could live a life of leisure devoting themselves to owning and breeding racehorses, collecting art and creating gardens. The brothers made several alterations to the house soon after they bought it, converting the monks' day room from an entrance hall into a dining room, moving the front porch, adding a stone newell staircase and putting in fireplaces and panelling. The work was done by architect Sidney Parvin from the London firm of interior designers Turner Lord, and featured in a 1930 edition of Country Life.

Henry moved out when he married in 1932, leaving his older brother, by then Lord Fairhaven (having been given the barony that was about to be bestowed on his father, Urban H. Broughton, when he died) as the last private owner of Anglesey Abbey. Lord Fairhaven made extensive additions to the house to provide room for his rapidly expanding collection of books, paintings, tapestries, clocks, furniture and objets d'art. The library wing, designed by Sidney Parvin, was added in 1937 and was followed by the Tapestry Hall, a staircase hall off the dining room, in 1939. In 1934 Lord Fairhaven bought and restored Lode Mill on the boundary of his property. The mill had been built in the 18th century but had been converted to grind cement rather than corn in 1900.

Lord Fairhaven converted the grounds of Anglesey Abbey, which had been largely meadow and grazing land when the brothers bought the property, into an 18th-century style park with avenues of trees, flower gardens, statuary and ornaments. The final addition to the house, a two-storey picture gallery designed by Sir Albert Richardson, was completed in 1956.

When Lord Fairhaven died in 1966, Anglesey Abbey was left to the National Trust together with an endowment of £300,000. Lord Fairhaven had stated in his will that the house should be preserved as "a complete and furnished entity so that it retains as far as possible the character of an English Home".

== Interior ==
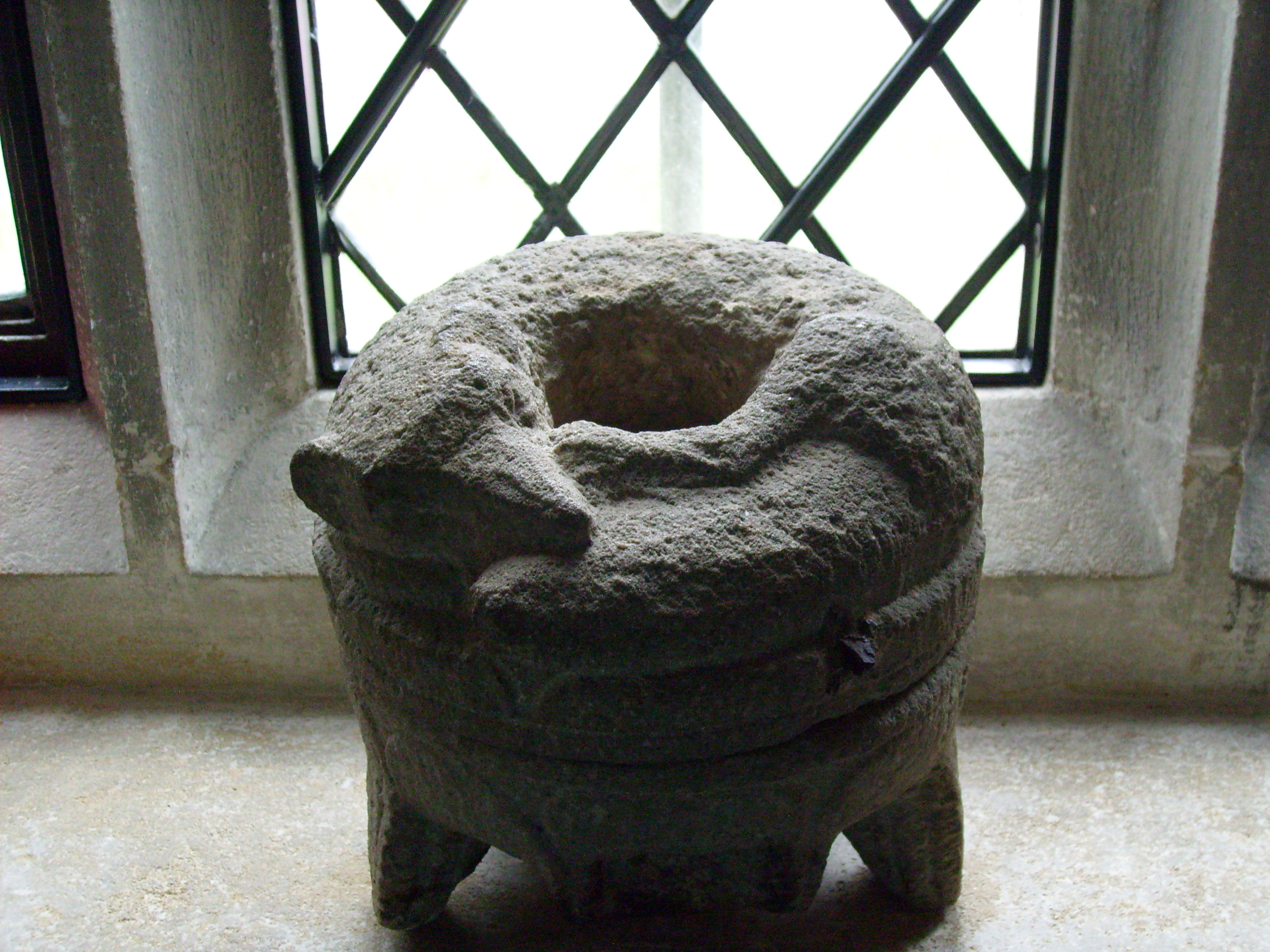
A thirteenth century quern in the shape of a sleeping fox in the dining room

In addition to its Grade I listing, the house is also notable for its contents. Lord Fairhaven's collection includes furniture, paintings and sculptures, clocks, tapestries, books, and objets d'art and, according to the author of a guide to Anglesey Abbey, expresses "an eclectic taste and refreshing disregard for fashion".

Rooms open to the public include the living room that initially formed the chapter house of the monastery and dates from the 13th century; the "oak room" with its oak panelling and plaster ceiling copied from that of the Reindeer Inn at Banbury; the dining room formed from the monks' day room; the tapestry hall; the service wing; the library, where various royal visitors have engraved their names on a window; several first floor bedrooms; and the two-storey picture gallery.

Furniture includes an Italian Renaissance refectory table in the dining room, chairs embroidered by Lord Fairhaven's mother in the living room, a white japanned Chippendale dressing table that once belonged to actor David Garrick in one of the bedrooms, and bookshelves made from the piles of John Rennie's Waterloo Bridge in the library. The tapestry collection includes, as well as seventeenth-century works, one commissioned by Lord Fairhaven from the Cambridge Tapestry Company depicting Anglesey Abbey and the Fairhaven coat-of-arms. There are a large number of clocks in the house with pride of place going to a four-tier pagoda-shaped clock in the living room.

The art collection at Anglesey Abbey reflects Lord Fairhaven's taste for British painting of the nineteenth century and earlier, with a particular fondness for views of Windsor Castle, landscapes, animal and bird paintings, and nudes by William Etty. The twentieth century is represented by paintings by Alfred Munnings, including a picture of a drum horse of the 1st Life Guards (Lord Fairhaven's old regiment), and a portrait by Oswald Birley of Lord Fairhaven in the ceremonial uniform of his regiment. There are paintings by John Constable, Thomas Gainsborough (a rare seascape), Richard Parkes Bonington, Edwin Landseer and the Pether family as well as a series of Tudor portrait panels. Lord Fairhaven collected over 750 paintings, prints and drawings of Windsor Castle. His interest in the castle dates from his youth when his parents had a country house near Windsor, and from when he was later stationed at the castle with his regiment. The Windsor collection was catalogued by art historian Cyril Bunt in 1949. Although most of the paintings in Anglesey Abbey are by British artists, foreign artists are represented in the Windsor collection and there are also flower pieces by Ambrosius Bosschaert and Jean-Baptiste de Fontenay, as well as three paintings by Claude Lorrain. Sculpture in the collection includes 18th-century marble horses, a 15th-century continental wooden figure of St Jerome, a bronze bull by Antoine-Louis Barye, and a collection of bronzes by R. Tait McKenzie, Frederic Leighton, Alfred Gilbert and others, and a silver Shield of Achilles by John Flaxman.

The library at Anglesey Abbey contains over 6,000 books, mostly ordinary reading books in fine bindings with about a thousand collector's books.

== Grounds ==
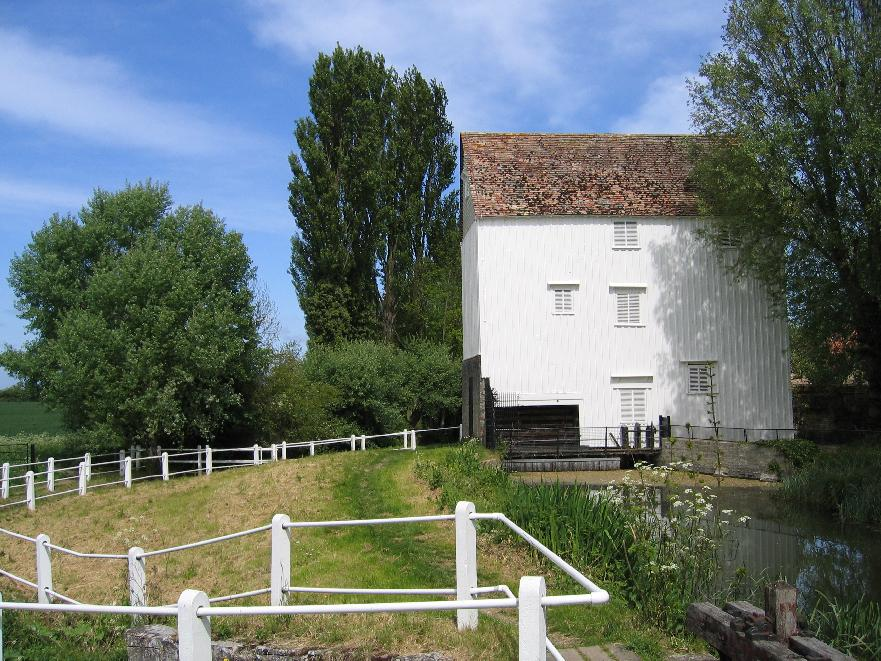
Lode Mill, situated on the edge of the gardens (pictured in May 2005)

The 98 acres (400,000 m^{2}) of Grade II* listed landscaped grounds at Anglesey Abbey are divided into several avenues, walks, vistas, and gardens, with classical statuary and flowerbeds. It was Lord Fairhaven who laid out the grounds in the style of an eighteenth-century park. He was responsible for replanting the rose garden and creating the dahlia garden, the herbaceous garden, the hyacinth garden and the Narcissus garden (so called because it has a statue of Narcissus in it) for seasonal bedding. To commemorate the coronation of King George VI and Queen Elizabeth in 1937, Lord Fairhaven planted an extensive avenue of trees with a crossing avenue at the far end. The trees used were London plane alternating with horse chestnut in four rows, copying those planted in Windsor Great Park. Storm damage in 1968 removed most of the plane trees leaving only the horse chestnut trees. The Temple Lawn was created in 1953 to commemorate the coronation of Queen Elizabeth II. In front of the house to the south there is a formal lawn and beyond it is a meadow where earthworks mark the position of fishponds from the original priory.

In 1964 American landscape gardener Lanning Roper wrote a book, The Gardens of Anglesey Abbey, in which he described the careful planning of the garden with its many vistas, avenues, rare and common trees, pools, statues and river temples. He describes how huge areas of sky and mown grass were used to balance symmetrical planting and how Lord Fairhaven used the trees and shrubs to make groups of contrasting colour and foliage. Three generations of the local Ayres family have worked in the gardens since 1921, with Noel and Richard becoming head gardeners. A Winter Garden was opened in 1998 in Lord Fairhaven's memory. In 2013 Richard Todd, head gardener at Anglesey Abbey since 1974, received the British Empire Medal for his years of service to the trust and national heritage. In 1999 he had been responsible for establishing a composting system to improve drainage and help retain water in a drought. Ten years later 95% of garden waste was composted.

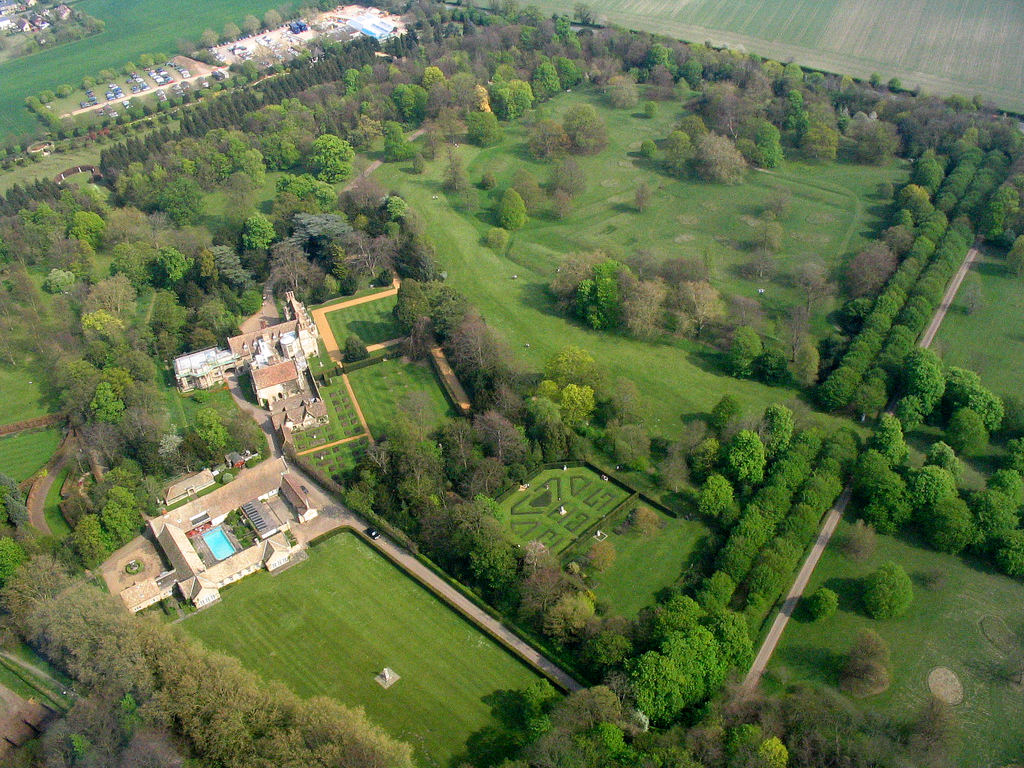
Aerial view of the house and gardens, showing the Summer House at left (June 2013)

To the north-west of the house, a block of farm buildings was converted into a large bungalow, complete with a swimming pool, to serve as the Summer House for the Fairhaven family in the days when they used to occupy Anglesey Abbey house in the winter before they moved to Kirtling Tower in 2004.

The grounds are bounded on the northwest by Bottisham Lode, with Lode Mill, bought and restored by Lord Fairhaven in 1934, at its head. To the south of the mill is the quarry pool, a large pool believed to be the site of a 19th-century coprolite mine.

== National Trust property ==
Anglesey Abbey, officially known as Anglesey Abbey, Gardens and Lode Mill, was until 2020 open to the public all year round. There is an admission charge, with National Trust members having a free entry. In 2025 there were 462,320 visitors to Anglesey Abbey, In 1978 the mill was restored to working order by the Cambridgeshire Wind and Watermill Society and flour can be bought in the mill or the shop. A new visitor centre with a restaurant and shop was opened in 2008. Seasonal attractions include the winter lights festival, snowdrop and daffodil tours in spring, and summer outdoor cinema.

In March 2020 the property was closed to visitors due to the COVID-19 pandemic, with the gardens and park re-opening in June 2020.

Anglesey Abbey was featured in the National Trust's 2020 Interim Report on the Connections between Colonialism and Properties now in the Care of the National Trust, Including Links with Historic Slavery since Samuel Shepheard, who bought the property in 1739 but did not live there or make any additions to it, had been one of the 24 directors of the East India Company from 1717 to 1721.

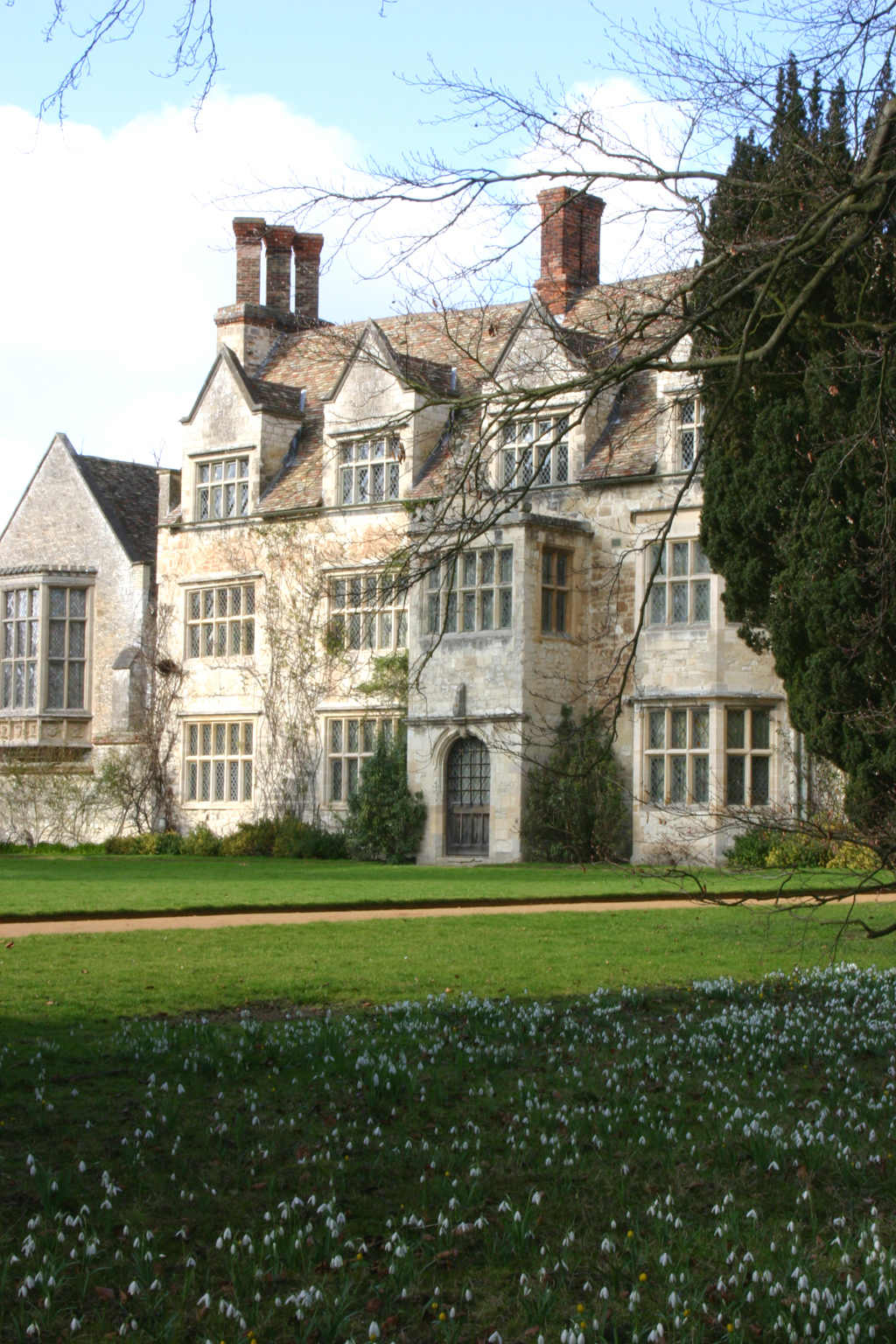
Snowdrops in front of the house

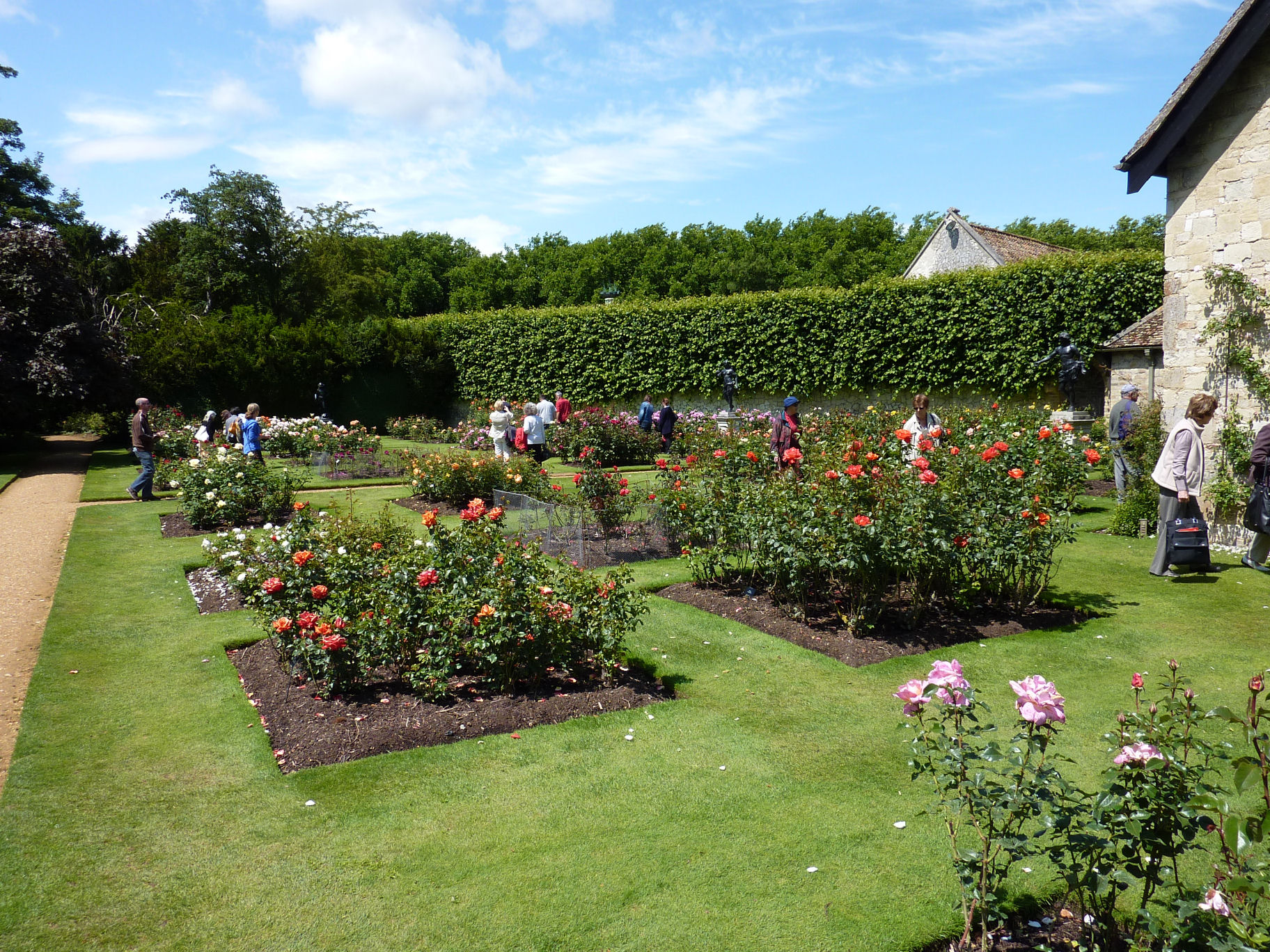
Rose Garden

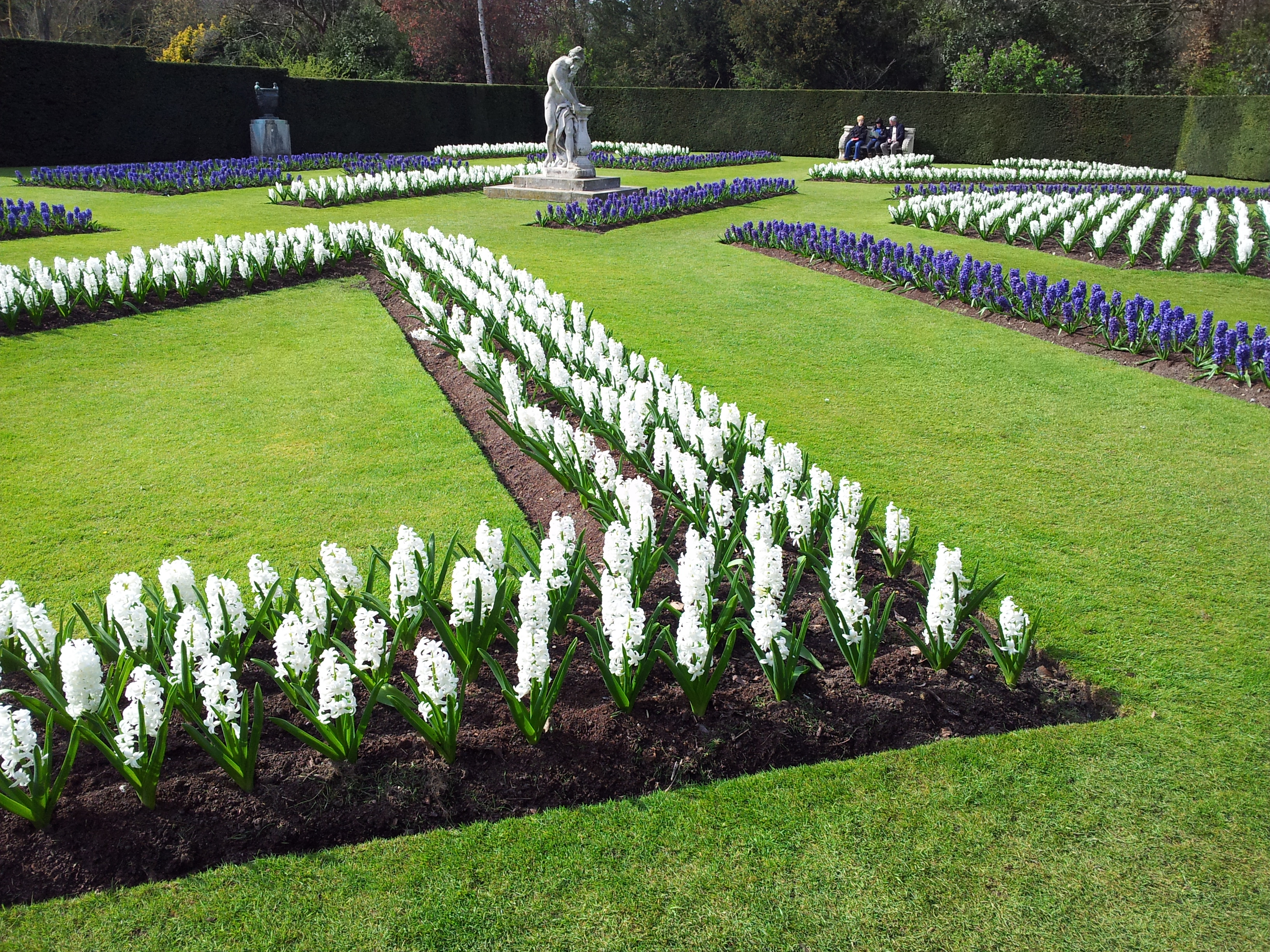
Formal Garden with hyacinths in spring

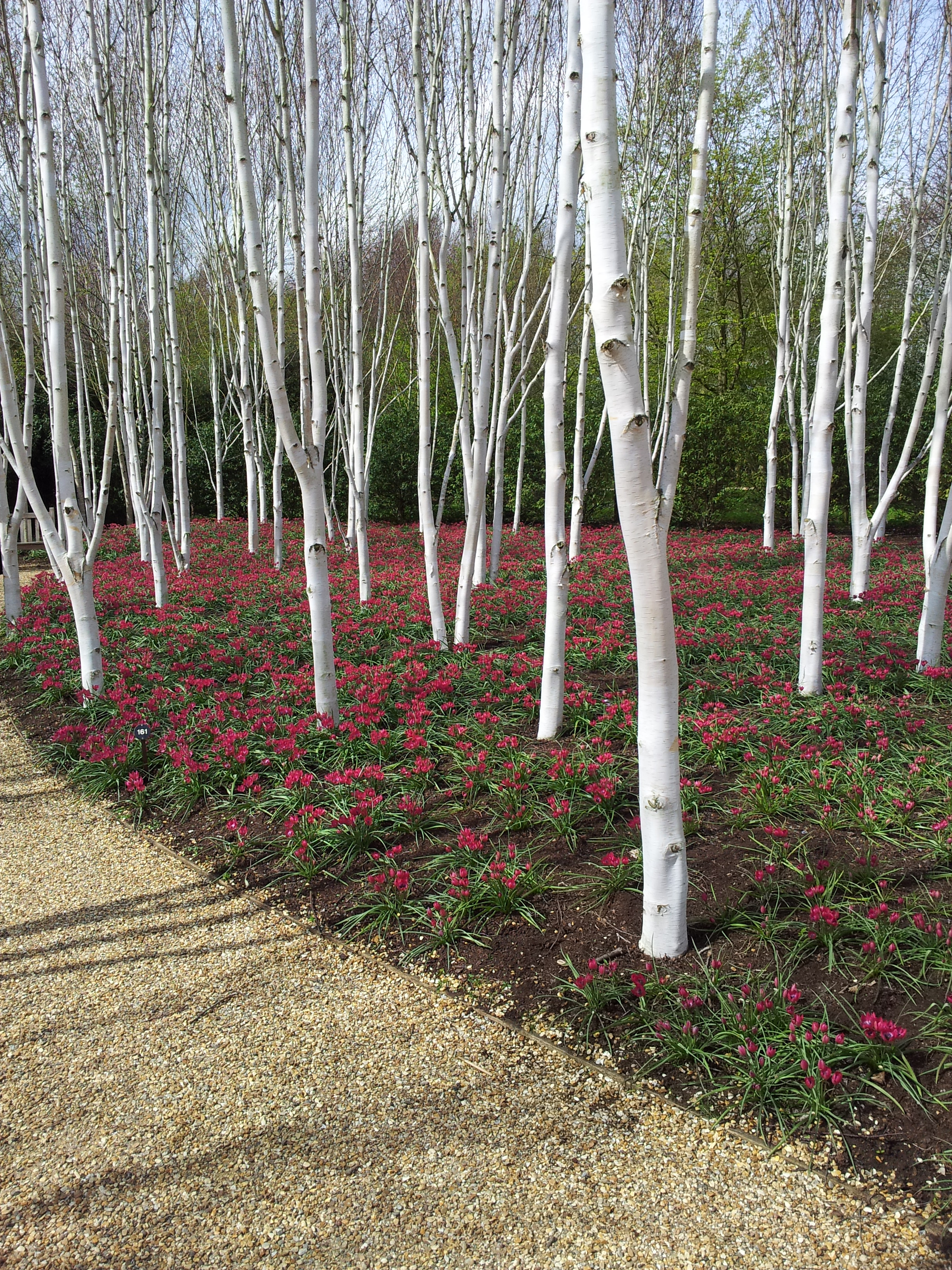
Winter Walk in spring

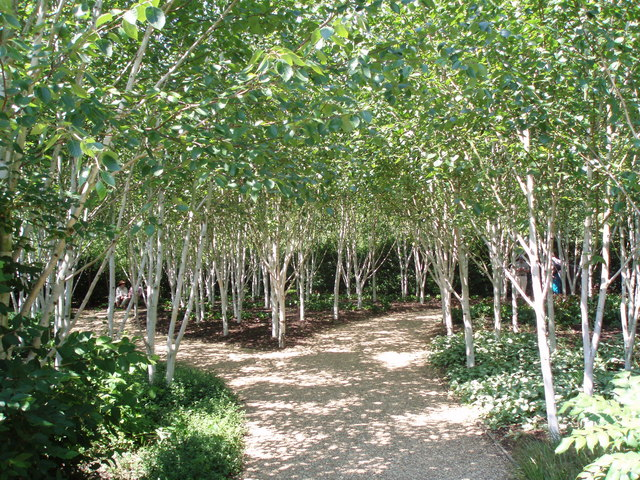
Winter Walk in summer

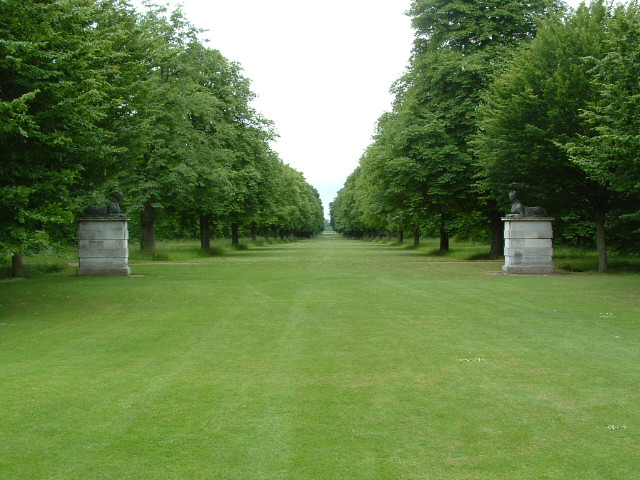
Coronation Avenue

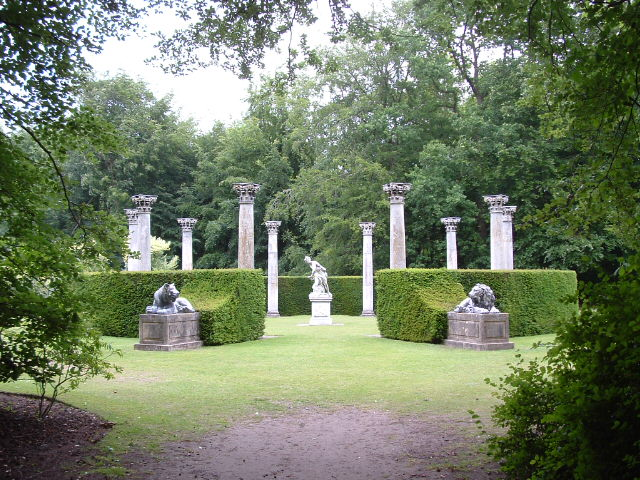
The Circular Temple

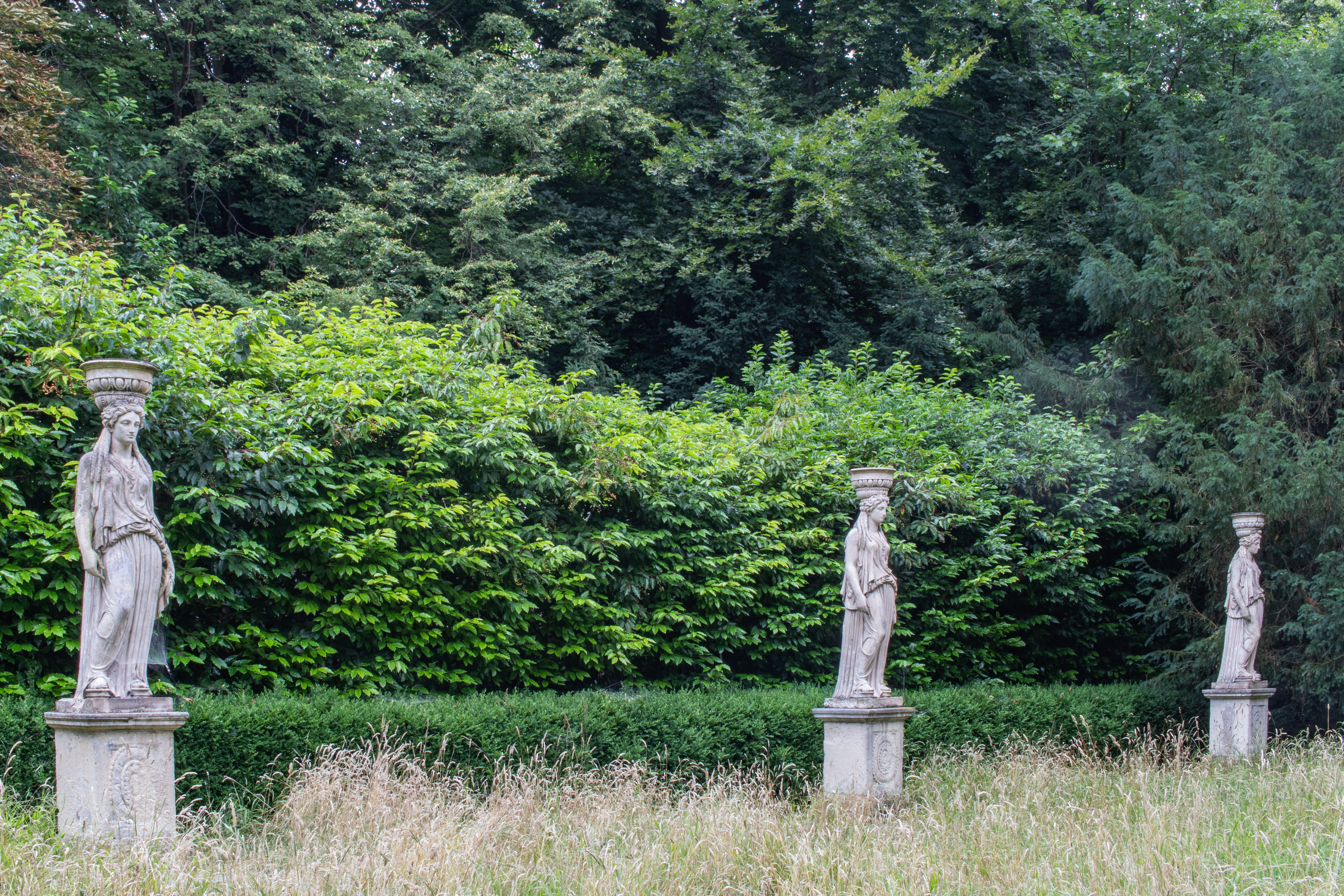
Three of six Caryatids at Coronation Avenue
