= Winlaw (surname) =

Winlaw is a surname. Notable people with the surname include:

- Ashley Winlaw (1914–1988), English cricketer and schoolteacher
- Roger Winlaw (1912–1942), English cricketer
- William Winlaw (died 1796), English engineer
