= Urban Huttleston Broughton, 1st Baron Fairhaven =

British peer, racehorse breeder and art collector

The Right Honourable The Lord Fairhaven
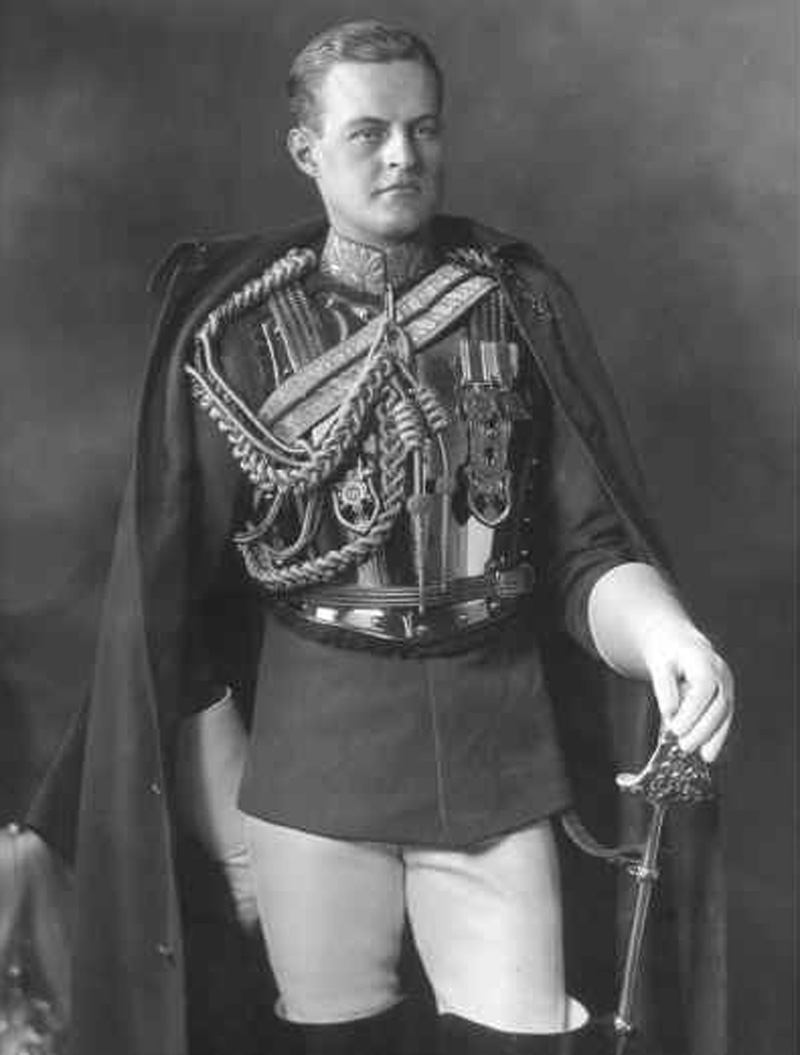
- Lieutenant Broughton in full dress uniform of the First Life Guards in 1921

Personal details
- Born: 31 August 1896 Fairhaven, Massachusetts, U.S.
- Died: 20 August 1966 (aged 69) Cambridge, U.K.
- Relations: Henry H. Rogers (grandfather); Henry Broughton, 2nd Baron Fairhaven (brother); Millicent Rogers (cousin)
- Parent(s): Urban H. Broughton; Cara Leland Rogers Broughton
- Education: St Paul's School; Harrow School
- Alma mater: Royal Military College, Sandhurst

Urban Huttleston Rogers Broughton, 1st Baron Fairhaven (31 August 1896 – 20 August 1966), usually known as Huttleston Broughton was an Anglo-American peer, racehorse breeder and art collector.

== Early life ==
Broughton was born on 31 August 1896 in Fairhaven, Massachusetts, in the United States. He was the eldest son of Urban Hanlon Broughton and Cara Leland (née Rogers) Broughton. His father was a British civil engineer who had gone to the United States to represent the hydro-pneumatic sewerage system of Isaac Shone. While he was installing the sewerage system in Fairhaven for Henry Huttleston Rogers, oil tycoon and one of the world's wealthiest men, he met and married Rogers' widowed daughter.

Broughton was named after his father, Urban, and his mother's paternal grandmother Mary Eldridge Huttleston. He attended St Paul's School, Concord, New Hampshire. In 1909, his maternal grandfather died, and Broughton's mother inherited an estimated $12.5 million from his estate. Three years later the family moved to England, buying a large property at 37 Park Street, Mayfair, London, and a country house, Park Close, at Englefield Green near Windsor, Berkshire. Broughton and his younger brother Henry Rogers Broughton attended Harrow School. In 1915, his father became a Conservative Member of Parliament for Preston. He did not stand for re-election in December 1918.

== Army career and peerage ==
In 1916, Broughton was commissioned into the 1st Regiment of Life Guards. He resigned his commission in the 1st Life Guards in 1924 and decided to go into business with his brother running a stud. There were cruises aboard the family's steam yacht Sapphire. Broughton had a collection of paintings and prints of the 1st Life Guards and in 1925 published a book, The Dress of the First Regiment of Life Guards in Three Hundred Years.

The brothers bought a stud at Great Barton near Bury St Edmunds and in 1926 they bought Anglesey Abbey in the village of Lode, Cambridgeshire. The property was conveniently close to the horse-racing town of Newmarket and to their stud. The estate also provided the brothers with good partridge shooting.

Broughton's father died in January 1929, shortly before he was due to receive a peerage in the 1929 New Year Honours, the announcement of the list having been delayed by two months due to the health of George V. The barony was instead awarded to Broughton, as the eldest son, who became the first Baron Fairhaven, of Lode in the County of Cambridge and his mother was allowed to use the title of Lady Fairhaven.

== Life at Anglesey Abbey ==
When the brothers bought Anglesey Abbey, it was a country house set in parkland and built around the remains of a medieval priory. They soon set about renovating the property, employing the architect Sidney Parvin to convert the medieval calefactory into a dining room, move the front porch, create a newel staircase, restore dormer windows and install fireplaces and oak panelling. Henry married in 1932 and moved out, as the brothers had arranged when they bought the house. Broughton continued to enlarge the house to accommodate his collection of books, pictures, furniture, tapestries, clocks and objets d'art, adding a library wing, also designed by Sidney Parvin, in 1937, a hall and staircase in 1939, and then in 1956 a picture gallery designed by Sir Albert Richardson.

As well as the alterations to the house, Broughton laid out gardens and planted avenues of trees in the parkland surrounding the house. He acquired statues and ornaments for the gardens.

The wealth that Broughton had inherited from his American grandfather allowed him to indulge his passion for collecting, an interest he shared with his mother, Lady Fairhaven. His collection included paintings by Claude Lorrain, John Constable, William Etty, Richard Parkes Bonington, Sir Alfred Munnings, as well as Tudor panel portraits and a number of paintings of Windsor Castle. The library at Anglesey Abbey contains nearly 5200 books, mostly ordinary reading books in fine bindings with about a thousand collector's books. There are also another approximately 3,000 books stored in various rooms around the property. When Broughton's mother, Lady Fairhaven, died in 1939 he inherited items from her collection, including a case of bejewelled crucifixes that she had collected on her travels and a painting by John Constable.

The brothers' most notable success on the racecourse was with a horse bred by Henry, Star Moss, who won the Ripon St Leger Trial before coming second in the 1963 St Leger. Broughton's horses included Constantia, who won the 1951 Lowther Stakes.

Broughton carried out public duties as a Liaison Commissioner of the Joint War Organisation during World War II, as deputy lieutenant of Cambridgeshire (appointed in 1937) and as a Justice of the Peace (appointed in 1939). His philanthropy included a gift of £30,000 to the Fitzwilliam Museum for the purchase of British School landscapes. The villagers of Lode were given a village hall in 1930 in memory of Broughton's father.

Broughton did not marry, and, in 1961, a second barony was conferred on him, with the remainder to his brother, Henry Rogers Broughton, 2nd Baron Fairhaven.

When Broughton died on 20 August 1966, 11 days before his 70th birthday, obituaries in The Times and The New York Times said he was known as "the shy peer" because he disliked publicity.

Anglesey Abbey was left to the National Trust, with the stipulation that the house and collection should remain exactly as it was at his death.

Peerage of the United Kingdom
New creation	Baron Fairhaven (of Lode in the County of Cambridge); 1929–1966	Extinct
New creation	Baron Fairhaven (of Anglesey Abbey in the County of Cambridge); 1961–1966	Succeeded by Henry Broughton
