= St Peter's School, Seaford =

St Peter's School
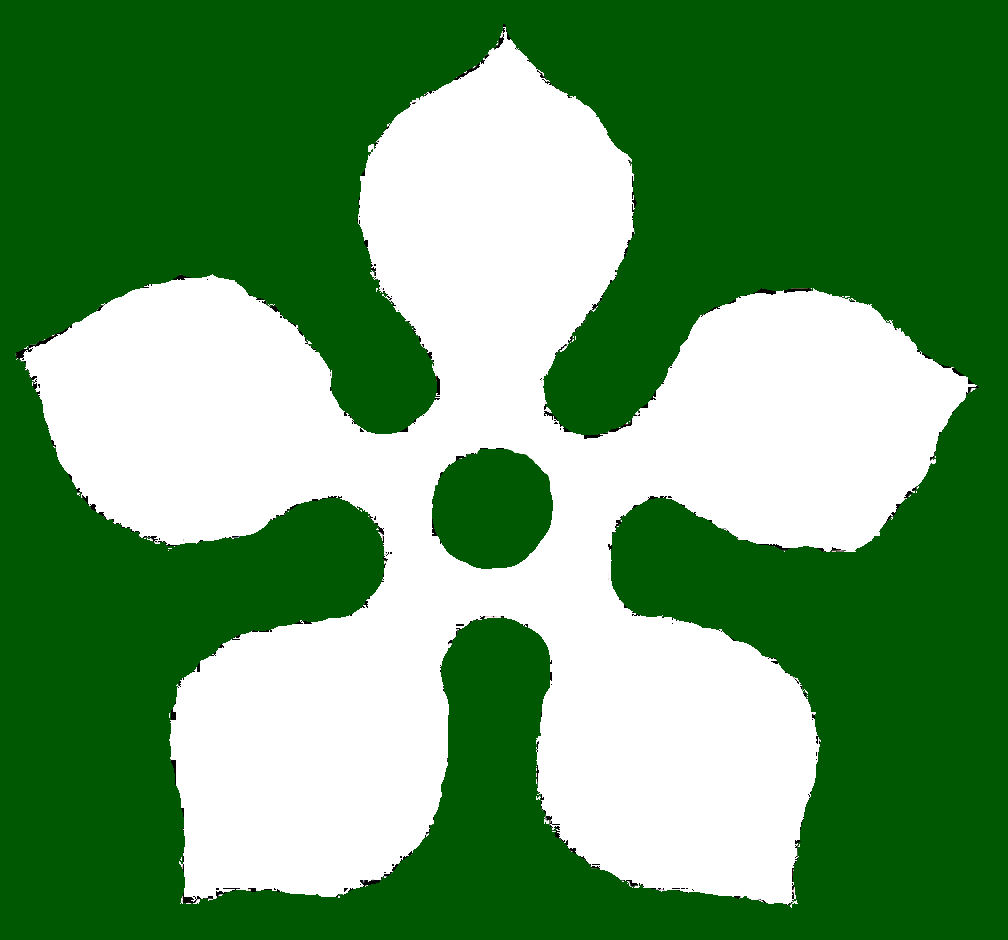

Location
- Sussex, BN25; England; 50.773456°N 0.101104°E

Information
- Established: 1903
- Closed: 1982
- Website: http://www.stpetersseaford.org.uk/

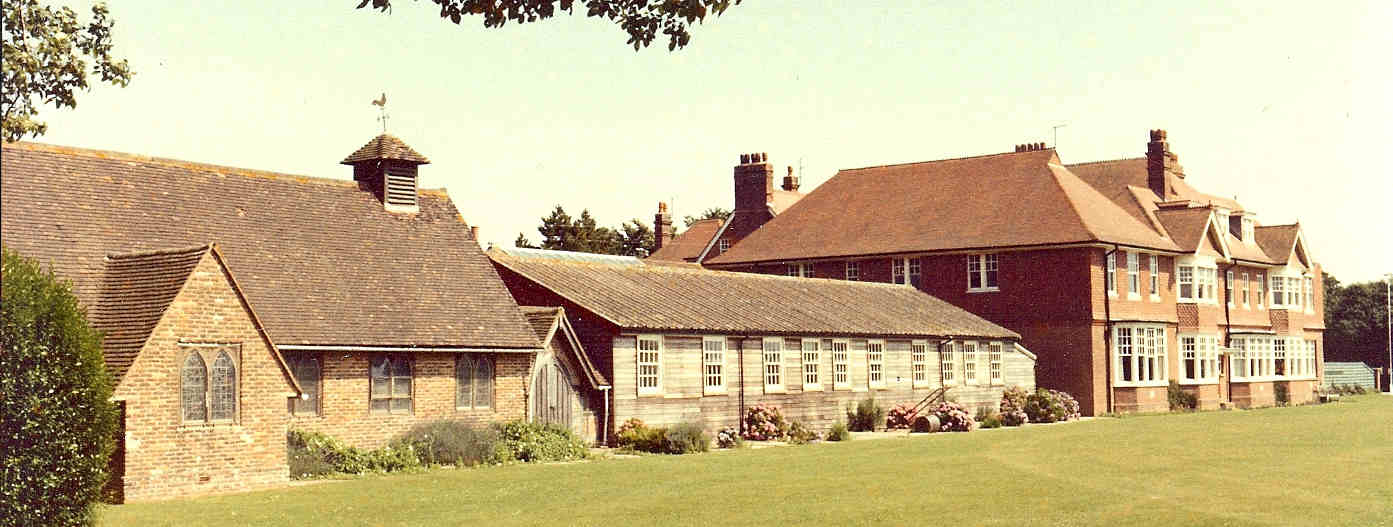
St Peter's School, Seaford frontage

St Peter's School, Seaford was an independent boys' preparatory school in Seaford, East Sussex, England, in operation from 1903 until 1982.

== History ==
=== Before and during World War One ===
Seaford House played host to St Peter's School in 1903, as an Edwardian prep school when it was founded by Maude Taylor in Crouch Lane. Taylor, who brought a small number of boys with her from an earlier school in Broadstairs, is recorded in the school history as having been a granddaughter of Thomas Arnold of Rugby School.

In 1907 it moved to a purpose-built house, and remained there until 1982 when the school closed. On moving into the purpose-built school, Taylor brought in two masters from St Peter's Broadstairs, Geoffrey Hellard and Oswald Wright, and became matron instead. Taylor left in 1912 when Hellard married.

In 1914 Rolf Henderson became the headmaster and his portrait painted by his brother, Keith, a Scottish artist, hung in the school dining room.

On 20 July 1915 the school playing fields were used to host a review of troops by Lord Kitchener. Kitchener mounted his horse in front of the school, and the boys gave such a loud cheer that the horse reared up, and almost dismounted its rider.

=== Before and during World War Two ===
In 1934 Pat Knox-Shaw, who had joined the school in 1919 as second master, became headmaster on Rolf Henderson's retirement.

In 1940, during the Second World War, St Peter's evacuated to The Nare Hotel in Veryan near Falmouth, Cornwall. It soon moved to Castle Hill, home of Lord and Lady Fortescue at Filleigh in North Devon until the end of the war, when in 1945 St Peter's moved back to its old home in Seaford, now vacated by the Army, and resumed normal service.

=== After World War Two ===
In 1955 Pat and Marjorie Knox-Shaw retired and Basil Talbot, an assistant headmaster, a member of the team from the 1930s briefly took over but he retired through ill health.

Michael Farebrother, another assistant headmaster, took the helm and shortly after was joined by an old boy, Harry Browell who together with Serena his wife, ran St Peters until 1967 when they retired to Australia. The gap was filled by Farebrother's brother and sister-in-law, John and Margaret Farebrother who moved down from Malvern College where John was a senior housemaster. As times changed, and boarders began to be fewer, the age of the traditional prep school's days were numbered and that coupled with the age of the Farebrothers left no alternative but to close St Peters in the summer of 1982.

The school was well-equipped, with facilities for rugby (called rugger), football (called soccer until the late 1970s), tennis, cricket, hockey, squash, shooting, Eton fives, archery, climbing and swimming. A chapel, with windows by Goddard & Gibbs, was built from 1938 to 1940, and opened just before the school was requisitioned for the War. It has all been swept away.

There was an auction and many of the contents were purchased by friends of the school. The war memorial in the Chapel is now in Seaford Museum, located in the Martello tower in the town. The buildings and grounds disappeared under a housing estate.

Mike Farebrother died in 1987, John Farebrother died in 1996 and his widow, Margaret Farebrother, died in 2006.

In 2013 a retired teacher at the school, Christopher Jarvis, was convicted of sexually assaulting boys at St Peter's in the 1970s. He was sentenced to eight years in prison. Jarvis taught at St Peters from 1962 to 1980, and at Bede's prep school in Eastbourne from 1982 to 2012. In 2015 he was convicted of further cases of sexually assaulting boys at St Peter's from 1962 onwards.

== Former pupils ==
- Sir Valentine Abdy Bt (1937-2012), European Representative at the Smithsonian Institution.
- Peter Blake (1927-2011), cricketer.
- Anthony Blunt (1907-1983), art historian and Soviet spy.
- Ronald Bowlby (1926-2019), bishop.
- Ailwyn Broughton, 3rd Baron Fairhaven (born 1936), army officer & Conservative peer.
- Sir Nicholas Browne (1947-2014), diplomat.
- Sir Donald Campbell (1921–1967), land and water speed record breaker When Campbell created a new water speed record in 1955, he cabled the school and asked for it to hold a half-day holiday.
- Sir Leycester Coltman (1938-2003), diplomat.
- Brian Cook (1910-1991), illustrator of Batsford Books, later Sir Brian Batsford, MP.
- Piers Courage (1942-1970), motor racing driver.
- Janric Craig, 3rd Viscount Craigavon (born 1944), crossbench peer.
- Sir Mordaunt Currie Bt (1894-1978), poet.
- Nigel Davenport (1928-2013), actor.
- Sir Trevor Dawson, Bt (1931-1983), the 3rd Baronet Dawson, who was a merchant banker and committed suicide following an insider trading scandal.
- Roger Ellis (born 1929), headmaster
- Nic Fiddian-Green (born 1963), sculptor.
- Sir Charles Fletcher-Cooke (1914-2001), MP.
- Sir John Fletcher-Cooke (1911-1989), MP.
- Sir Robert Fulton (born 1948), naval officer and Governor.
- Michael Gilbert (1912-2006), crime fiction writer.
- Herbert Jones (1940-1982).
- Rupert Jones (born 1969), army officer.
- David Marsden (1938-1998), neurologist.
- Bill McCowen (born 1937), bobsledder.
- Patrick Mollison (1914-2011), haematologist.
- J. H. C. Morris (1910-1984), legal academic.
- Christopher Nevill, 6th Marquess of Abergavenny (born 1955).
- John Pollock (1924-2012), biographer of the Rev Billy Graham.
- Tony Priday (1922-2014), bridge player.
- Mike Randall (1919–1999), journalist and newspaper editor
- Anthony Russell-Roberts (born 1944), opera manager.
- Gerry Spring Rice, Lord Monteagle (1926-2013), army officer & Conservative peer.
- Nick St Aubyn (born 1955), MP.
- George Steer (1909-1944), journalist and war correspondent.
- Justin Welby (born 1956), 105th Archbishop of Canterbury
- Chris West (born 1954), historian.
- Billy Winlaw (1914-1988), cricketer and headmaster.
- Roger Winlaw (1912-1942), cricketer and Air Force officer.
