= Hailstone (surname) =

Hailstone is a surname. Notable people with the surname include:

- Bernard Hailstone (1910–1987), English artist
- Dominic Hailstone (born 1973), English film director
- Herbert Hailstone (1850–1896), English author and scholar
- John Hailstone (1759–1847), English geologist
- Reg Hailstone (1901–1963), Australian farmer and civic leader
- Samuel Hailstone (1768–1851), English botanist
- Vivien Hailstone (1913–2000), Native American designer and educator
