= Fairhaven Woodland and Water Garden =

Garden in Norfolk, England

Coordinates: 52.670°N 1.497°E

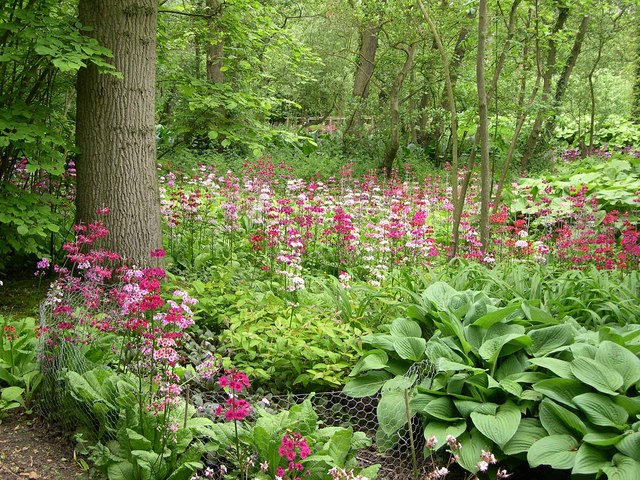
Fairhaven Woodland and Water Garden

Fairhaven Woodland and Water Garden, Norfolk, England, is a registered charity, comprising 131 acres (0.53 km^{2}) of ancient woodland, woodland garden and water garden and including South Walsham inner Broad. Within the garden is an ancient fishpond (King Stephens fishpond - listed in the Domesday book), a 950-year-old oak, over 95 recorded species of birds, a private broad, many species of wild and cultivated plants the most spectacular being the Candelabra primulas – around 50,000 flower during the last two weeks in May and the first two weeks in June.

A network of dykes criss-cross the garden and are all cleared by hand each winter using a traditional tool called a chrome. Other traditional practices used within the garden are coppicing and leaf harvesting to create a natural fertiliser. The garden is one hundred per cent organically managed. The late 1990s saw the return of Otters to the garden and broad.

Until the 1980s, the garden was mainly dense wooded areas, but Dutch Elm disease and the 1987 gale saw one thousand fall. The areas that lost a large number of trees (several of them large Oaks) became open glade areas suitable for more cultivated plants that required more sun than the woodland plants. Plants such as Gunnera manicata, hydrangeas, philadelphus, cornus and daffodils were planted to give the garden year round interest.

== The History of the Garden ==
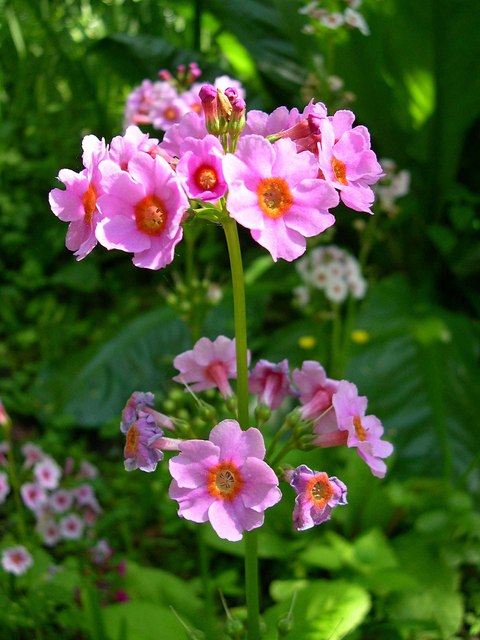
A Candelabra Primula within the Water Garden

Fairhaven Woodland and Water Garden was created by the 2nd Baron Fairhaven, Henry Rogers Broughton, and left in trust upon his death in 1973. Henry Broughton purchased the 350 acre (141.6 hectare) South Walsham Estate in 1946 which had been used by the military during the 2nd World War. Restoration of the house and the formal gardens required immediate attention so work upon the woodland and water garden did not begin until the following year when he moved to South Walsham Hall from Surrey where he had already developed a garden at Bakenham House, Englefield Green. Inspiration for the woodland and water garden came from his friend Sir Eric Savill, the creator of the Valley and Savill Gardens in Windsor Great Park.

The 2nd Lord Fairhaven was an enthusiastic gardener, who designed the Woodland and Water Garden. He had a team of seven gardeners and two woodmen to assist him, who worked in the greenhouses, formal garden, vegetable garden and the woodland garden. The woods, untended in the 2nd World War, had become a jungle.

Lord Fairhaven cleared what is now the main garden, introducing shade and water loving plants including candelabra primulae by the thousand, yellow flowering Lysichiton americanus (skunk cabbage), camellias and rhododendrons specially imported from the Himalayas. Over ninety per cent of the new plants for the garden were grown from seed in the greenhouses and brought on in the formal garden before being planted out in the woodland. Trees were grown in the nursery to 6 ft (1.8 m), and were transferred to the woodland garden. It took fifteen years to complete the development of the garden.

== Facilities ==
Fairhaven Woodland and Water Garden has a cafe area.
