= Warming House =

Warming House may refer to:

- A calefactory, a common part of a medieval monastery
- Warming House (Denver, Colorado), a Denver landmark
