= Hailstone (disambiguation) =

Hailstone typically refers to a piece of hail.

Hailstone may also refer to:

- Hailstone (surname), list of people with the surname
- Hailstone, Utah, a former town, now submerged
- Operation Hailstone, a 1944 American military operation against Japan

== See also ==
- Collatz conjecture, also known as the hailstone sequence
- Hail (disambiguation)
