= South Walsham =

Village and civil parish in Norfolk, England

Coordinates: 52.664°N 1.495°E

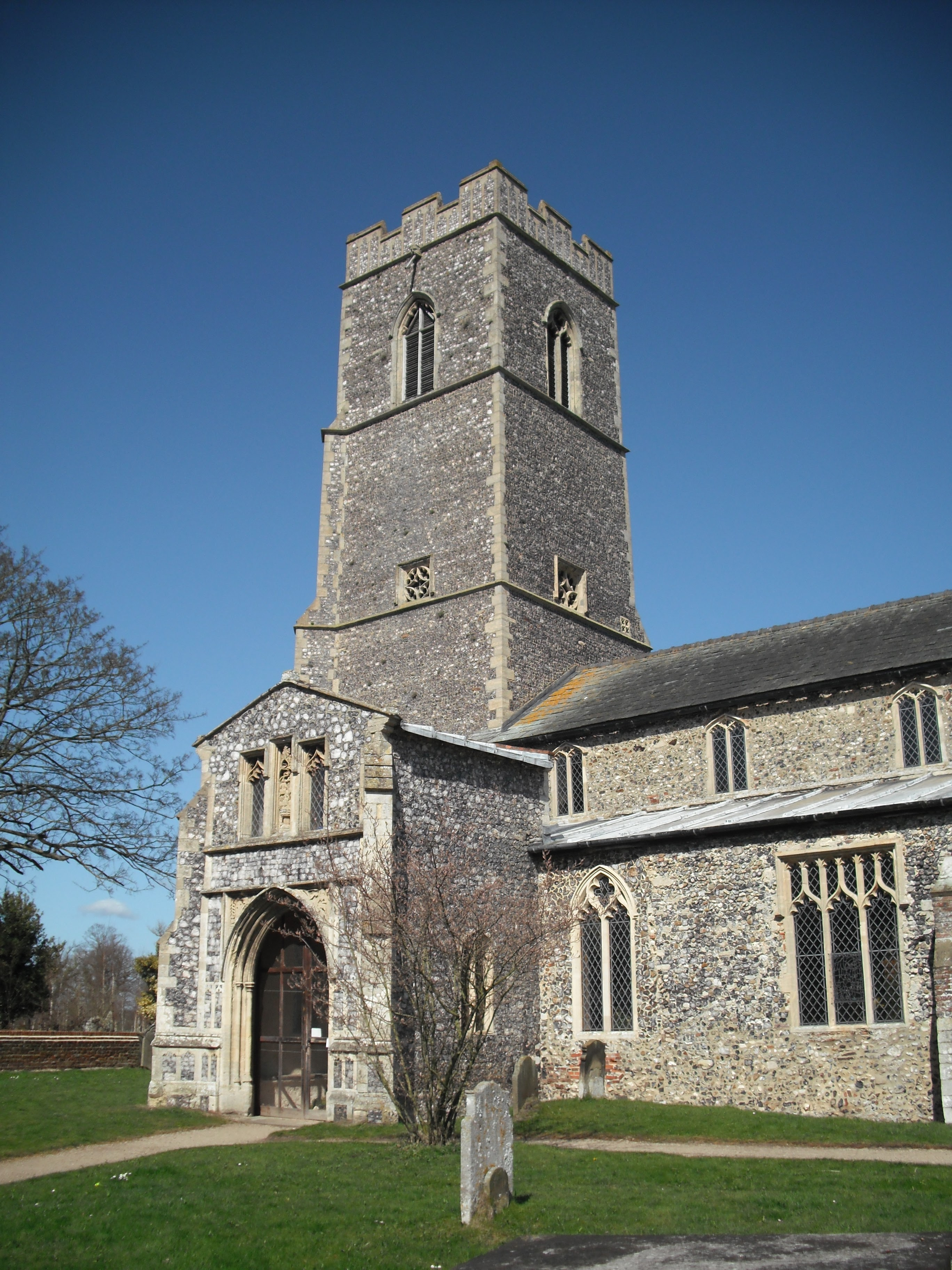
- St Mary's Church, South Walsham

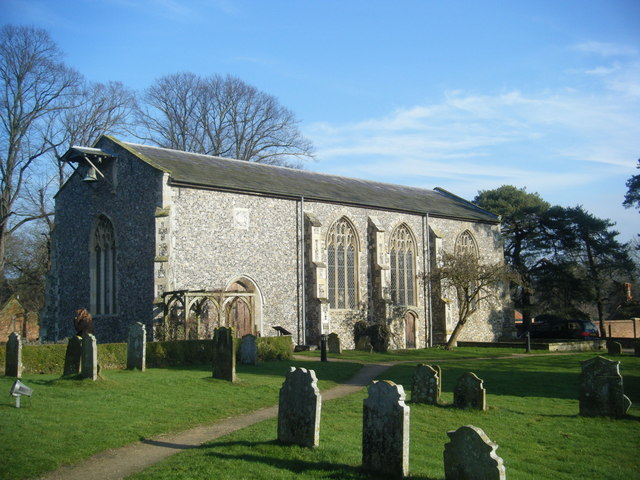
- St Lawrence Church, South Walsham

- Location within Norfolk
- Area: 11.43 km^{2} (4.41 sq mi)
- Population: 845 (2011)
  - Density: 74/km^{2} (190/sq mi)
- OS grid reference: TG364130
- Civil parish: South Walsham
- District: Broadland
- Shire county: Norfolk
- Region: East
- Country: England
- Sovereign state: United Kingdom
- Post town: NORWICH
- Postcode district: NR13
- Dialling code: 01603
- Police: Norfolk
- Fire: Norfolk
- Ambulance: East of England

South Walsham is a village and civil parish in the English county of Norfolk. It covers an area of 11.43 km^{2} (4.41 sq mi) and had a population of 738 in 303 households at the 2001 census. increasing to 845 living in 345 households at the 2011 Census. For the purposes of local government, it falls within the district of Broadland. Historically, the village comprised two separate parishes, that of St Mary and of St Lawrence. After fire damage in 1827, the church of St Lawrence slowly fell into disuse and the two parishes were combined in 1889.

The village has a primary school, a pub and the disused St Lawrence's church, the tower of which collapsed in 1971, has been repurposed as the St Lawrence Centre for Training and the Arts, hosting various music concerts, art exhibitions, craft fairs and charity events. The parish is also home to the South Walsham estate, purchased in 1946 by Major Henry Broughton, 2nd Lord Fairhaven, which remains in the ownership of the family. Large parts of the estate are opened to the public as the Fairhaven Woodland and Water Garden. Throughout its history, South Walsham has been linked with the wealthy St Benet's Abbey located just outside the parish.

The parish of South Walsham includes the hamlets of Town Green and Pilson Green, and South Walsham Broad lies adjacent to the village.

== Correct pronunciation ==
"Sowolsam", "Wals'm"

== History ==
The villages name means 'W(e)alh's homestead/village' or 'Britons' homestead/village'.

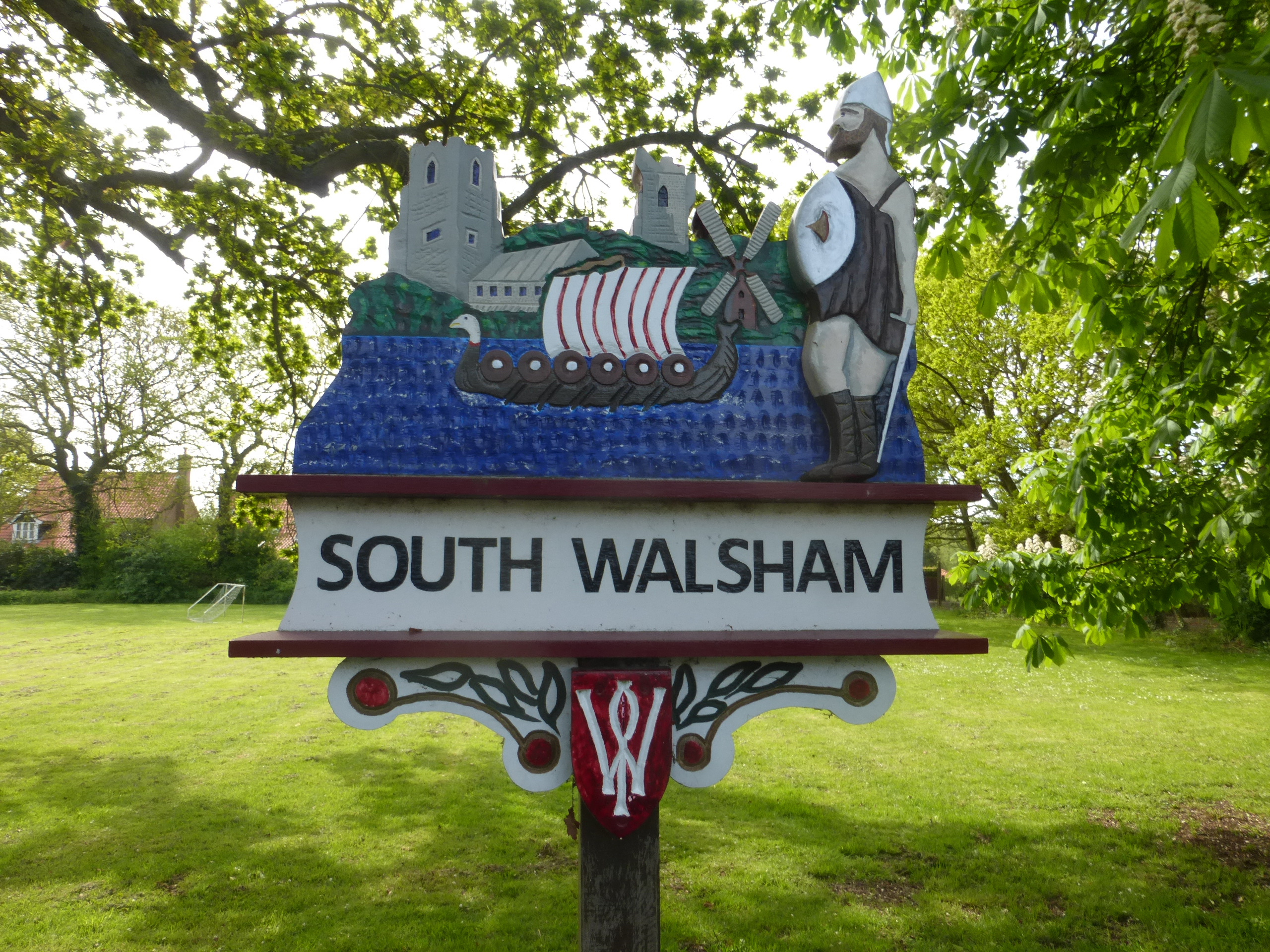
South Walsham village sign

South Walsham is recorded in the Codex Diplomaticus Aevi Saxonici as Súðwalshám in a document produced during the reign of Edward the Confessor. Early documents suggest that land in the present parish was owned by a freeman named under Guert, the brother of Harold Godwinson at the time of the Norman conquest of England, before passing under the stewardship of Godric the Steward. Its entry in the Domesday Book shows land ownership divided between William the Conqueror, William, Bishop of Thetford, Godric the Steward and St Benet's Abbey - in total, there were around 124 villagers excluding women and children. During the Middle Ages, much of the land in the parish was used to produce peat for fuel, and records of turbary show that around two hundred thousand turves were sold per annum, yielding an average income of around seven pounds per annum. These revenues dropped rapidly, from over eight pounds (and 250 000 units) in 1268–69 to around two pounds (and 56 700 units) in 1290–91, as the former peat cuttings began to flood and The Broads were formed. There are references to flooded land (or Broddinge) as early as 1315.

After the English Reformation, the abbey at St Benet's remained in use for some time, but had fallen into decay by the early stages of the reign of Elizabeth I.

In the twentieth century, war memorials list 14 deaths from within the parish during World War I. The tower of St Lawrence's church, damaged by a fire on 30 May 1827, collapsed on 18 March 1971, with little damage to the church itself.

== Notes ==
http://kepn.nottingham.ac.uk/map/place/Norfolk/South%20Walsham%20St.%20Mary
