= Baron Fairhaven =

Extinct barony in the Peerage of the United Kingdom

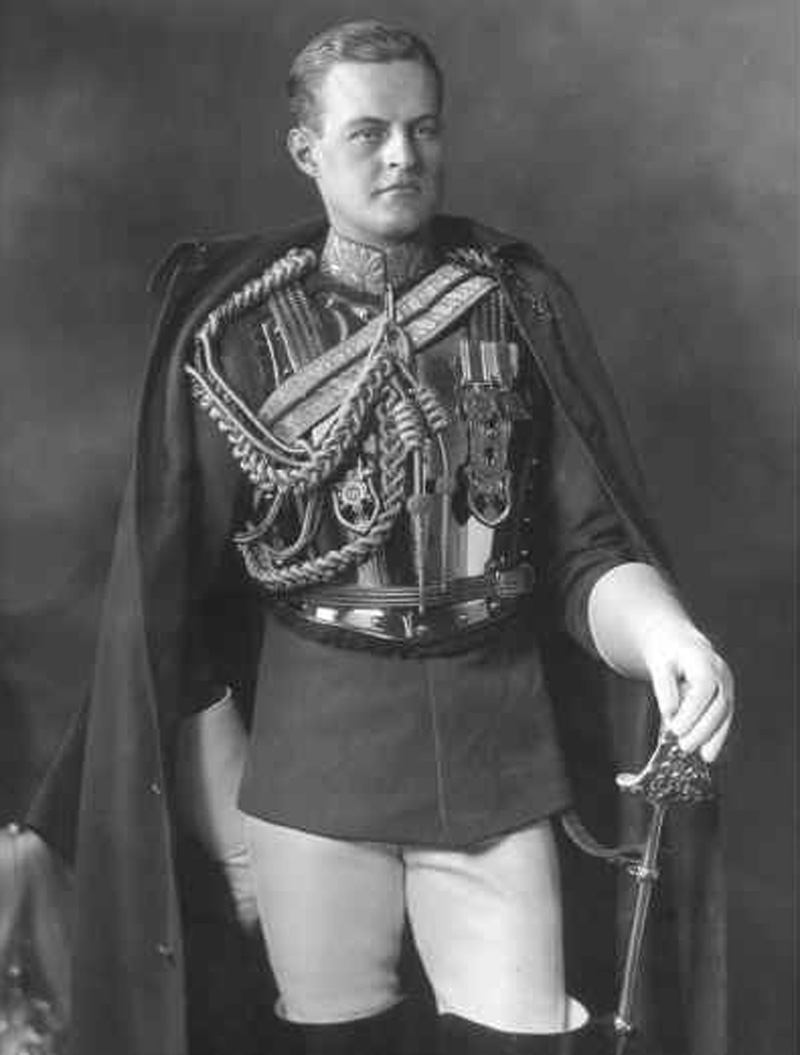
Portrait of The 1st Baron Fairhaven

Baron Fairhaven, of Anglesey Abbey in the County of Cambridge, is a title in the Peerage of the United Kingdom. It was created in 1961 for Urban Huttleston Broughton, 1st Baron Fairhaven, with remainder to his younger brother, Henry Rogers Broughton (1900–1973). He had already been created Baron Fairhaven, of Lode in the County of Cambridge, in 1929, with remainder to the heirs male of his body.

The first Baron Fairhaven was the eldest son of Urban Hanlon Broughton, a civil engineer, businessman and Conservative Member of Parliament who died in January 1929 before his intended elevation to the peerage as Baron Fairhaven. At the same time, Lord Fairhaven's mother, Cara Leland Broughton, daughter of the American industrialist Henry Huttleston Rogers, was granted Royal warrant to the style and title as if her husband had been created Baron Fairhaven.

As the first Baron Fairhaven had no male heirs, in 1961 he was created Baron Fairhaven, of Anglesey Abbey in the County of Cambridge, with special remainder to his younger brother, Henry. On the Baron's death in 1966, the barony of 1929 became extinct. The barony of 1961 and title 2nd Baron Fairhaven passed to the younger brother Henry Rogers Broughton. Upon his death in 1973 the title then passed to his only son, the third Baron.

The title is unusual in referring to a town in the United States, Fairhaven in Massachusetts, which was the birthplace of the first Baron.

The family seat is Anglesey Abbey, now in the care of the National Trust, near Lode, Cambridgeshire.

Before becoming the 2nd Baron Fairhaven, Henry Rogers Broughton created the Fairhaven Woodland and Water Garden in South Walsham, Norfolk. This was left in trust on his death in 1973

== Barons Fairhaven (1929; First creation) ==
- Urban Huttleston Broughton, 1st Baron Fairhaven (1896–1966)

== Barons Fairhaven (1961; Second creation) ==
- Urban Huttleston Broughton, 1st Baron Fairhaven (1896–1966)
- Henry Rogers Broughton, 2nd Baron Fairhaven (1900–1973)
- Ailwyn Henry George Broughton, 3rd Baron Fairhaven (b. 1936)

The heir apparent is the present holder's son, the Hon. James Henry Ailwyn Broughton (b. 1963)
The next in line to the heir apparent is his son, George Ailwyn James Broughton (b. 1997)

=== Line of Succession ===
- Urban Hanlon Broughton (1857—1929)
  - Urban Huttleston Rogers Broughton, 1st Baron Fairhaven (1896—1966)
  - Henry Rogers Broughton, 2nd Baron Fairhaven (1900—1973)
    - Ailwyn Henry George Broughton, 3rd Baron Fairhaven (born 1936)
      - (1) Major Hon. James Henry Ailwyn Broughton (b. 1963)
        - (2) George Ailwyn James Broughton (b. 1997)
      - (3) Hon. Charles Leander Broughton (b. 1973)
      - (4) Hon. Henry Robert Broughton (b. 1978)
