= Muniment =

Legal terminology

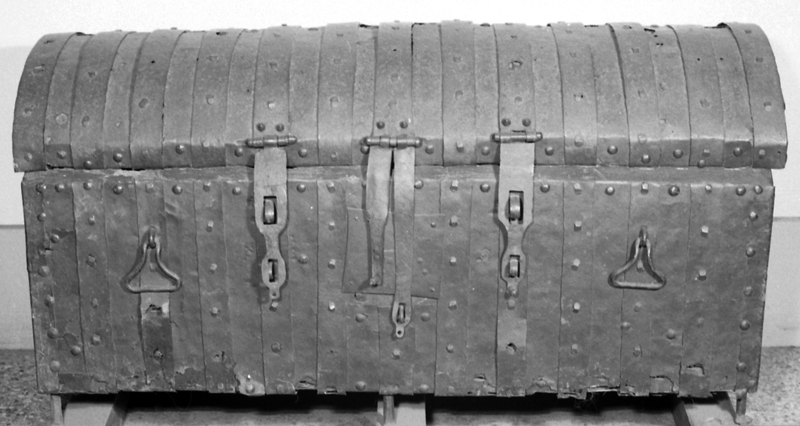
Iron-covered muniment chest, 14th century, used by the English Exchequer to store documents

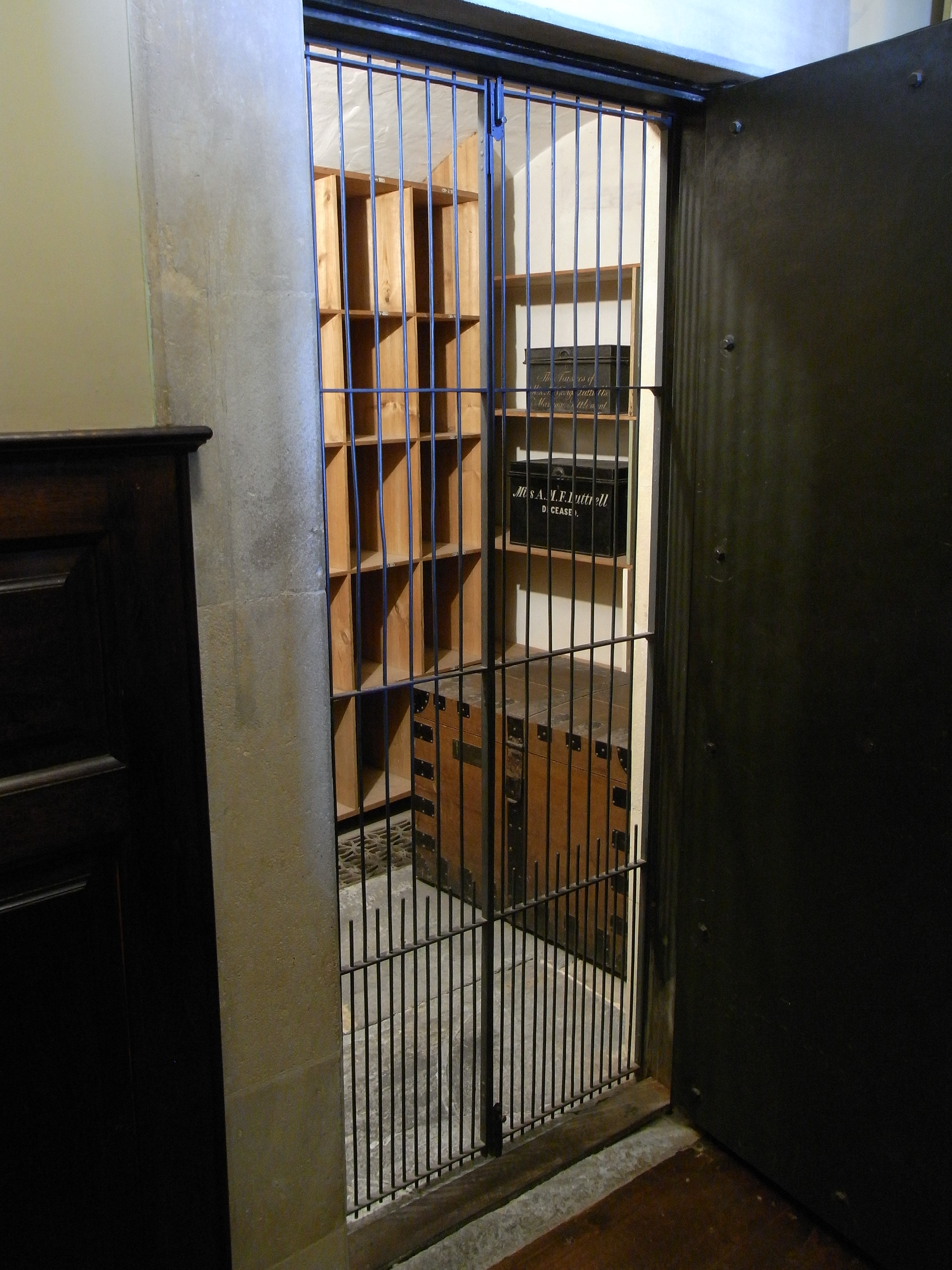
View into muniments room of Dunster Castle, Somerset, England, in which the Luttrell family kept secure the title deeds of its many estates

A muniment or muniment of title is a legal term for a document, title deed or other evidence, that indicates ownership of an asset. The word is derived from the Latin noun munimentum, meaning a "fortification, bulwark, defence or protection". Thus "muniments of title" means the written evidence which a land owner can use to defend title to his estate.

An example of muniment of title is the use of a death certificate of a joint tenant to prove that title resides with the surviving joint tenant.

In the United States the definition of "muniment" may differ in statutes state by state. For example, states often have their own version of a Marketable Record Title Act (MRTA) which will extinguish various interests, restrictions, or claims to a property within a certain time period unless renewed during that time period by muniments.

A muniment of title is any documentary evidence upon which title is based. Muniments of title are deeds, wills, and court judgments through which a particular land title passes and upon which its validity depends. Muniments of title need not be recorded to be valid notwithstanding that the recording statutes give good faith purchasers certain rights over the rights of persons claiming under unrecorded muniments of title. Muniments of title do more than merely "affect" title; they must carry title and be a vital link in the chain of title.

In the medieval period substantial landowners made use of dedicated chambers known as "muniments rooms" for the secure storage of muniments of title. Before the advent of capitalism and the stock-market investment, the ownership of land and operational manors was the principal asset used by the English gentry for the long-term storage of wealth. It was essential to prove "devolution of title" to an estate, which necessitated the retention of every historical deed which had been used at some time over decades if not centuries to transfer legal ownership of that estate. For example, if it had been determined historically in a court of law that "person X" had good title to an estate at some past date, the present owner, in order to have equally good title, needed to prove that he had obtained, in a valid manner, the asset directly or indirectly from person X. For example, if a royal charter survived granting a manor to person X, that would constitute an ideal starting point from which to prove devolution of title. Thus several charters, indentures, entails, marriage settlements and last will and testaments of varying dates and contained within several sheets of parchment might form the complete devolution of title for just one estate. Many gentry families in England held particular estates for many centuries (the Berkeley family has held Berkeley Castle since the 12th century, and holds it still in 2021), generating a large volume of documents of title as the estate passed down the generations of the family. Such often large and highly verbose documents were generally folded up to form small packets and were then sealed with wax, with an epitome or summary of the document written in ink on the finished packet.

In 21st-century England, the establishment of the Government department of the Land Registry, and the compulsory requirement for persons and companies to register all land transactions, renders the use of title deeds superfluous and devolution of title is not required to prove title as proof of title is now determined prima facie merely by an entry in the land register, a certificate certifying which entry can be provided by the registrar if required. In previous times title deeds were the main evidence of ownership (apart from physical possession of land, said by the old adage to form "nine tenths of the law"), and where a person owned dozens of estates, many of which he rarely or never visited, and ownership of which was frequently the subject of legal challenges, for example by distant relatives of testators, it was essential to safeguard title deeds. Security needed to provide not only against theft, but also against destruction of the parchment (i.e. animal skin) and ink by fire, excessive heat, sunlight, water, mould, insects and rodents. Thus in certain monasteries the muniments room was often situated above the warming house. Special chests were used, designed specifically to aid preservation. Rapid portability of muniments was also a consideration, in case of fire or armed attack of the building.

The intact muniments room of an ancient mansion house or castle was frequently found by modern historians and genealogists to provide a rich source of materials for research purposes.

== See also ==
- Westminster Abbey Muniments
