= Westminster Abbey Muniments =

Coordinates: 51°29′56″N 0°7′39″W

The Westminster Abbey Muniments is a collection of muniments and manuscripts comprising archives of Westminster Abbey from the tenth century to the present day. The core of the collection contains accounts, manuscripts, and court records of the large estate. Before they were put together in the archives, they were scattered across southern and mid-England.

== Notable Items ==
- Charters of the Anglo-Saxons
- Leases of the Westminster Abbey
- Coroners' Inquests for the City of Westminster (1760–1880)

== Royals and Administrators with Westminster Abbey Documents and Manuscripts ==
- Lord Steward
- Almoner and Cellarer

== Court Records of Westminster Abbey ==
On account of criminal activity, immigration, poverty and immorality, Westminster Abbey was used as a monumental court for many years. In the archives, there are many records of court cases from the Court of Burgesses. In 1700 alone the court heard sixty-eight cases of failure to repair the streets, fifty-six cases of selling in false measures, and twenty-five other regulatory cases, as well as seventeen cases of disorderly, bawdy or gaming houses.
