= Ailwyn Broughton, 3rd Baron Fairhaven =

British peer and equestrian

Major The Right Honourable The Lord Fairhaven KStJ DL

Personal details
- Born: Ailwyn Henry George Broughton; 16 November 1936 (age 89)
- Spouse: Kathleen Patricia Magill (m. 1960)
- Children: 6
- Parent: Henry Broughton, 2nd Baron Fairhaven
- Education: Eton College
- Alma mater: Royal Military Academy Sandhurst

Military service
- Allegiance: United Kingdom
- Branch: British Army
- Rank: Major
- Unit: Royal Horse Guards
- Awards: Order of the White Rose of Finland

Ailwyn Henry George Broughton, 3rd Baron Fairhaven KStJ DL (born 16 November 1936), is a British peer and equestrian.

== Early life ==
Lord Fairhaven was the son of The Rt Hon. Henry Rogers Broughton, 2nd Baron Fairhaven, and The Hon. Diana Rosamond Fellowes: his maternal grandfather was Coulson Churchill Fellowes, eldest son of the 2nd Baron de Ramsey.

He was educated at Eton College and the Royal Military Academy, Sandhurst.

== Career ==
On 2 August 1957, he commissioned into the Royal Horse Guards, and served in the regiment until his retirement with the rank of Major in 1971. In 1970 he was invested as a Knight as the Order of the White Rose of Finland. In 1973 he was Deputy Lieutenant of Cambridgeshire and Isle of Ely, and on 6 April 1973 he succeeded his father as Baron Fairhaven and assumed his seat in the House of Lords as a Conservative.

In 1975, Lord Fairhaven was a Justice of the Peace in Cambridgeshire, and between 1977 and 1984 he served as Vice-Lord Lieutenant of Cambridgeshire. From 1985 to 1989, Lord Fairhaven was Senior Steward of the Jockey Club. In 1992 he was invested as a Knight of the Order of St. John of Jerusalem.

== Personal life ==
On 23 September 1960, he was married to Kathleen Patricia Magill, the eldest daughter of Colonel James Henry Magill OBE, of Queen's House, Ousden. Together they have had six children, including:

- The Hon. Diana Cara Broughton (b. 1961), who married (div. 1990) as his first wife Guy Dominic Thornton, the eldest son of Brian Thornton, in 1983. They divorced in 1990 and she married, as his third wife, Capt. Alan Brodie Henderson in 1992, a grandson of Sir Charles Madden, 1st Baronet.
- The Hon. James Henry Ailwyn Broughton (b. 1963), who married Sarah Olivia Creighton, a daughter of Harold Creighton, in 1990.
- The Hon. Melanie Frances Broughton (b. 1966), who married (div. 1992) Matthew Eric Smith, eldest son of Dr. Mark Eric Smith, in 1989. They divorced in 1992 and she remarried to Andrew Edgar in 1994. They divorced in 2002.
- The Hon. Huttleston Rupert Broughton (1970–2000)
- The Hon. Charles Leander Broughton (b. 1973), who married Nicola Goggs on 22 May 1999.
- The Hon. Henry Robert Broughton (b. 1978), who married Angela Hampshire on 27 June 2015.

Lord Fairhaven's heir apparent is his eldest son, Maj. James Henry Ailwyn Broughton.

Peerage of the United Kingdom
Preceded by Henry Rogers Broughton	Baron Fairhaven; 1973–present	Incumbent; Heir apparent: Hon. James Broughton
