= Windsor Court =

Coordinates: 51.4323°N 0.5938°W

Windsor Court

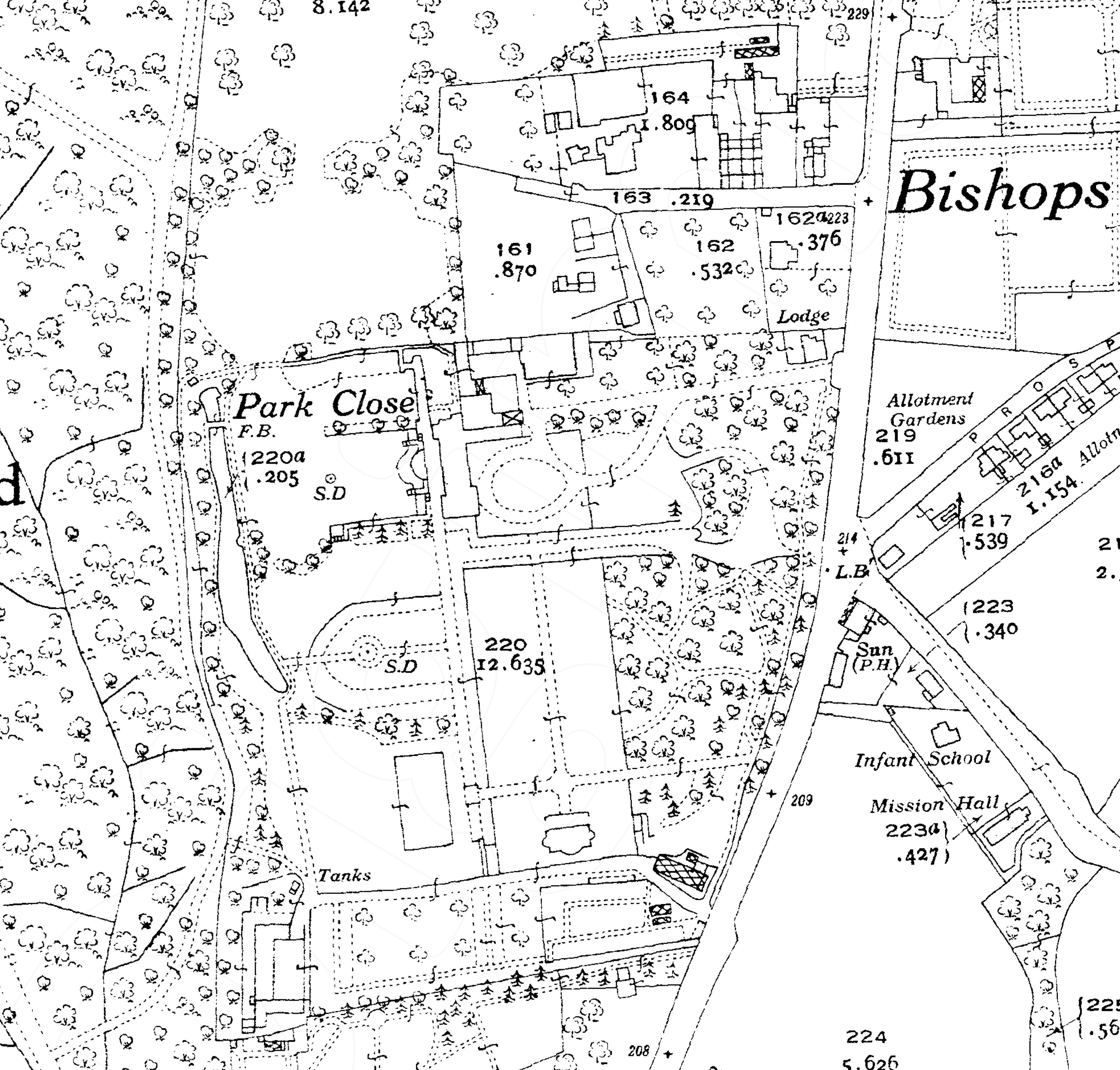
Park Close (centre) on a 1935 Ordnance Survey map

Windsor Court is a large country house in, Englefield Green, Surrey, England. The mansion adjoins Windsor Great Park.

== History ==
The 37,000 sq ft house was built as Park Close between 1899 and 1901 in an eclectic mix of styles, most notably Arts & Crafts. The main house has 10 bedrooms, 12 bathrooms and 6 reception rooms. The estate includes 25 acres of mature gardens, cottages, stables and a large dower house.

Park Close was owned in its early years by the civil engineer and politician Urban Hanlon Broughton as his summer residence. In 1930, his widow Mrs Urban H. Broughton was still living there and at 37 Grosvenor Square, London. In 1949, it was home to Norman Greenlees Weir.

In 2004, it was bought for £8 million, by "resolutely anonymous" owners, but they apparently never moved in or did any work on the house, except to rename it as Windsor Court.

In April 2016, it was listed for sale at £19.9 million, having been reduced from £25 million. As of June 2020 it is listed for sale at £15,999,950. According to The New York Times, the house, which is in need of extensive and costly restoration work could be saved, but is "more likely to be knocked down and replaced".
