= Ashley Winlaw =

English cricketer and schoolteacher

Personal information
- Full name: Ashley William Edgell Winlaw
- Born: 8 February 1914; Sydenham, London, England
- Died: 13 March 1988 (aged 74); Portsmouth, Hampshire, England
- Batting: Right-handed
- Role: Occasional wicket-keeper
- Relatives: Roger Winlaw (brother)

Domestic team information
- Years: Team
- 1936: Minor Counties
- 1935–1939: Bedfordshire

Career statistics
Competition	First-class
Matches	1
Runs scored	13
Batting average	6.50
100s/50s	–/–
Top score	13
Balls bowled	–
Wickets	–
Bowling average	–
5 wickets in innings	–
10 wickets in match	–
Best bowling	–
Catches/stumpings	1/–
- Source: Cricinfo, 28 July 2013

Ashley William Edgell Winlaw OBE (8 February 1914 – 13 February 1988) was an English cricketer, later a schoolteacher.

== Early life ==
Winlaw was born at Sydenham, London, and educated at St Peter's School, Seaford, Winchester College and St John's College, Cambridge.

== Cricket ==
Winlaw was a right-handed batsman and occasional wicket-keeper, who played the majority of his cricket in minor counties cricket, though he did make one appearance in first-class cricket.

He made his debut in minor counties cricket for Bedfordshire against Buckinghamshire in the 1935 Minor Counties Championship. He played minor counties cricket for Bedfordshire from 1935 to 1939, making thirty appearances. It was in 1936 he made his debut in first-class cricket, having been selected for a combined Minor Counties cricket team against the touring Indians at Lord's. In a match which the Indians won by an innings and 74 runs, Winlaw scored 13 runs in the Minor Counties first-innings before he was dismissed by Amar Singh, while in their second-innings he was dismissed for a duck by Mohammad Nissar.

His brother Roger Winlaw was also a first-class cricketer.

== Schoolteacher ==
Winlaw taught at Aldenham School and Shrewsbury School, then served during World War II in the Intelligence Corps. After the war he taught at several schools in various countries. He was the Headmaster at Achimota College in then Gold Coast colony (modern day Ghana). For his service as headmaster of the Government Cadet College at Hasan Abdal, Pakistan, he was appointed OBE.

Winlaw died at Portsmouth, Hampshire, on 13 February 1988.
