= Urban H. Broughton =

English civil engineer

Member of Parliament for Preston
- In office 1915–1918 Serving with George Stanley
- Preceded by: Alfred Aspinall Tobin; George Stanley
- Succeeded by: Thomas Shaw; George Stanley

Personal details
- Born: Urban Hanlon Broughton; 12 April 1857 Worcester, England
- Died: 30 January 1929 (aged 71) London, England
- Party: Conservative
- Spouse: Cara Leland Rogers Duff (m. 1895)
- Children: Urban Huttleston Rogers Broughton; Henry Rogers Broughton
- Education: Grove Park School; University of London

Urban Hanlon Broughton (12 April 1857 – 30 January 1929) was an English civil engineer who went to work in the United States, married an American heiress, returned to England and was for three-and-a-half years a Conservative Member of Parliament. In 1928, he donated Ashridge House to the Conservative Party and in 1929, he was in line for elevation to the peerage, but he died before the honour was bestowed. His wife, Cara Leland (née Rogers) Broughton, was granted the style of a baron's wife, and their eldest son was created the first Baron Fairhaven.

== Early life ==
Broughton was born in Worcester, England on 12 April 1857, the son of railway manager John Broughton and Abigail Elizabeth (née O'Hanlon) Broughton. The family moved around as John Broughton worked for different railway companies, living in Lapworth, Warwickshire and, later, Ireland.

In the 1860s, John and Elizabeth Broughton spent six years in India, leaving their children with relatives of Elizabeth in Ireland. Tragedy struck the family when three of the children died within one week. The surviving children were reunited with their parents in 1868 and the family settled in Wrexham in North Wales, where Broughton attended Grove Park School. John Broughton spent the last ten years or more of his life in the Joint Counties Lunatic Asylum in Carmarthen, Wales.

Broughton was a pupil of the firm Low and Thomas, civil and mining engineers of Wrexham, from 1875 to 1878. He also studied at the University of London and won the Miller Prize of the Institution of Civil Engineers.

== Career and marriage ==
Broughton's early career included work on the construction of Felixstowe docks, 1882–1884. He then went to the United States to promote the hydro-pneumatic sewerage system of Isaac Shone, a former neighbour from Wrexham. He worked on sewerage systems in Chicago and other towns and, on his own account, was a contractor for 1893 World Fair in Chicago.

In 1895, Broughton was invited by oil tycoon Henry Huttleston Rogers of Standard Oil to install the Shone sewerage system in his home town of Fairhaven, Massachusetts where the family had a summer home. At Fairhaven, Broughton met Cara Leland Duff, the widowed daughter of Henry Rogers. The couple were married on 12 November 1895. Berrow's Weekly Journal, a newspaper from Broughton's home town of Worcester, England, reported the marriage: "Another American millionaire young lady is about to marry an Englishman, who is not a duke. He is not even a baron but a simple commoner. The lady is a widow and worth a million in her own right". The couple had two sons: Urban Huttleston Rogers Broughton (known as "Huttleston"; 1896-1966) and Henry Rogers Broughton (1900-1973). Following his marriage, Broughton became involved in his father-in-law's business affairs, while maintaining his connection to the Shone Company, managing a copper firm and setting up the National Copper bank.

When Broughton's father-in-law died in 1909, his wealth was divided between his four surviving children equally, and Cara and Urban Broughton became enormously wealthy. Three years later, the family left the United States to take up residence in England, buying a large property at 37 Park Street, Mayfair, London, and a country house, Park Close, at Englefield Green near Windsor, Berkshire. The two sons attended Harrow School. Broughton decided to become a Member of Parliament for the Conservative Party and in June 1915 he was elected unopposed in a by-election in Preston, Lancashire. He was appointed Parliamentary Private Secretary to the Attorney General F.E. Smith. Finding the role of an MP tedious, he did not stand for re-election in the December 1918 general election.

In 1916, Broughton published a pamphlet, The British Empire at war, which was intended to encourage the United States to enter World War I. Cara Broughton became involved with charitable work for soldiers during the war, while their son Huttleston Broughton served in the 1st Life Guards.

Cara Broughton owned a steam yacht, the Sapphire, and Broughton wrote two accounts of their voyages, one printed for private circulation in 1922, and one published in 1926. He was a member of the Royal Yacht Squadron and the Royal Thames Yacht Club.

In 1928, Broughton purchased Ashridge House in Hertfordshire, and donated it to the Conservative Party as a memorial to former Prime Minister Bonar Law. The Times announced: "The purposes of the gift are to preserve for the nation a historic site and a stately building, to establish a centre where all grades of Conservatives can find a curriculum suited to their requirements and to give enjoyment to the public by admitting it to the gardens once a week". The gift was said to be worth three or four hundred thousand pounds.

Broughton died of pneumonia at his home in Park Street on 30 January 1929. He had been due to receive a peerage in the 1929 New Year Honours, but the announcement of the list had been delayed by two months due to the health of George V and so the barony was awarded to his eldest son instead. The official list recorded that the barony was awarded to "Broughton, Urban Huttleston Rogers Esq, in consideration of the public, political and philanthropic services of his father, whose elevation to the Peerage would have been recommended to His Majesty but for his death on January 30, 1929". On 2 May 1929 the king proclaimed that "Cara Leland Broughton, widow of Urban Hanlon Broughton, may henceforth enjoy the same style and title as if her husband...had survived and received the title and dignity of Baron Fairhaven".

== Legacy ==
On 11 December 1929 a memorial tablet to Broughton in the chapel of Ashridge house was unveiled by Stanley Baldwin. In 1929 Lady Fairhaven and her sons bought the historic Runnymede Meadow, with adjoining lands totaling 182 acres (0.74 km^{2}), twenty miles (32 km) southwest of London, and presented it to the National Trust "to preserve for ever the site where Magna Carta was signed and to honour the memory of the late Mr Urban Hanlon Broughton, husband of Lady Fairhaven and father of Lord Fairhaven and Captain Broughton".

Lady Fairhaven and her sons commissioned Sir Edwin Lutyens to design a set of twin memorials consisting of two lodges and pillars at the Windsor end of the meadow and two kiosks and pillars at the Egham end. The pillars were unveiled by The Prince of Wales on 8 July 1932 in a ceremony attended by Lady Fairhaven, her son Lord Fairhaven, Sir Edwin Lutyens, Windsor MP Annesley Somerville, and others.

Parliament of the United Kingdom
Preceded by Alfred Tobin and George Stanley	Member of Parliament for Preston; 1915–1918; With: George Stanley	Succeeded by Tom Shaw and George Stanley
