= Roger Winlaw =

English cricketer

Personal information
- Full name: Roger de Winton Kelsall Winlaw
- Born: 28 March 1912; Morden, Surrey, England
- Died: 31 October 1942 (aged 30); Caernarvon, Caernarvonshire, Wales
- Batting: Right-handed
- Bowling: Right-arm off break
- Relatives: Ashley Winlaw (brother)

Domestic team information
- Years: Team
- 1935–1936: Marylebone Cricket Club
- 1932–1939: Bedfordshire
- 1932–1934: Surrey
- 1932–1934: Cambridge University

Career statistics
Competition	First-class
Matches	52
Runs scored	2,708
Batting average	35.63
100s/50s	7/11
Top score	161*
Balls bowled	41
Wickets	–
Bowling average	–
5 wickets in innings	–
10 wickets in match	–
Best bowling	–
Catches/stumpings	17/–
- Source: Cricinfo, 29 May 2011

Roger de Winton Kelsall Winlaw (28 March 1912 – 31 October 1942) was an English amateur cricketer who played for Cambridge University and Surrey. A pre-war member of the RAF Volunteer Reserve, he died as a result of a mid-air collision in a training accident in the Second World War.

== Education ==
Winlaw was born in Morden, Surrey to the Rev. George Preston Kelsall Winlaw and Minnie Ashley, and was educated at Winchester College. At Winchester he won the Rugby fives national schools doubles championships in 1931 with HJH (John) Lamb, the only Wykehamist pair to have done so up until 2005 (when it was won by WA Ellison and HK Mohammed), and in addition won the singles twice (1930 and 1931). On going up to Cambridge University in 1931, he continued as Lamb's fives partner in 1932, 1933 and 1934.

Winlaw was a member of the Winchester College cricket eleven from 1928 to 1931, and was captain in the last two seasons. His best year was 1930, when he headed both the batting and bowling averages.

== Cricket career ==
At Cambridge University, he received his Blue in 1932, making his first-class debut against Yorkshire on 11 May 1932. Over three seasons with Cambridge, he made 30 appearances scoring 1938 runs at an average of 43.06.

His best year was 1934, when he was second to John Human in the batting averages with 977 runs at 57.47, and hit five centuries, the highest being 161 not out against Essex at Fenner's. He hit two centuries in the match against Glamorgan at Cardiff. The other centuries came at Fenner's – 104 against Yorkshire and 103 against the Free Foresters amateur side.

He also played in nine county matches for Surrey in 1934, scoring 341 runs, average 28.41, and his full aggregate amounted to 1,330, average 42.90. His best score was 91 against Sussex at The Oval. He was also prominent in the Middlesex match, scoring 61 in the first innings, and then, having been forced to retire injured in the second innings, resuming when the ninth wicket fell and helping Ted Brooks achieve victory by one wicket.

Winlaw also played for Bedfordshire in the Minor Counties from 1932. He captained Bedfordshire in 1935, and headed the averages with 85 for an aggregate of 425. In 1936, they rose to fourth in the Minor Counties Championship, the best season since 1905. Winlaw's fielding, generally at mid-off, was highly rated though his batting was less successful. He played for Bedfordshire through to 1939.

== Life outside cricket ==
He played three times in the University Association football match on the right wing, being captain in his last year. Before joining the Royal Air Force, Winlaw was a master at Harrow School. He also played football for Corinthian making five appearances between 1934 and 1937 playing at inside-left, scoring twice.

He was already a sergeant in the RAF Volunteer Reserve when he was commissioned as a pilot officer on probation on 3 February 1938, and promoted to flying officer on 3 August 1939. He was called to active service with the Royal Air Force on the outbreak of the Second World War, and promoted flight lieutenant on 3 September 1940, and squadron leader on 1 March 1942. He was a member of No. 256 Squadron RAF when he was killed on 31 October 1942 when the plane he was piloting on a training mission collided with another in mid-air near Caernarfon, North Wales. The observer of Winlaw's Beaufighter was Squadron Leader Claude Ashton, a fellow Old Wykehamist who had played 127 games for Cambridge and Essex, and was also a Corinthian footballer, who played once for England. Winlaw is commemorated at Liverpool Crematorium, Anfield.

He had married Marsali Mary Seymour Seal, a schoolmistress; his widow remarried to John Montgomery in 1945, their son, Hugh Massingberd, (born Hugh John Montgomery in 1946), becoming an eminent journalist.
