= Samuel Hailstone =

British botanist (1768–1851)

Samuel Hailstone (1768–1851) was an English botanist.

== Life ==
Hailstone was born at Hoxton, near London, in 1768. His family shortly afterwards settled in York. He was articled to John Hardy, a solicitor at Bradford. On the expiration of his articles Hardy took him into partnership. The scanty leisure of a busy professional life was devoted to botany, and Hailstone became known as the leading authority on the flora of Yorkshire. He formed collections illustrating the geology of the district, and of books and manuscripts relating to Bradford. He contributed papers to the Magazine of Natural History (1835, viii. 261–5, 549–53), and a list of rare plants to Thomas Dunham Whitaker's History of Craven (1812, pp. 509–19). His valuable herbarium was presented by his sons to the Yorkshire Philosophical Society, and is now in the museum at York.

His brother was the Rev. John Hailstone, the geologist. He married in 1808 Ann, daughter of Thomas Jones, surgeon, of Bradford. His wife died in 1833, aged 53. He died at Horton Hall, Bradford, on 26 December 1851, aged 83, leaving two sons, John, a clergyman, and Edward. Edward (1818–90) succeeded his father as solicitor at Bradford, and finally retired to Walton Hall, near Wakefield, where he accumulated a remarkable collection of antiquities and books, among them the most extensive series of works relating to Yorkshire ever brought together, which he left to the library of the dean and chapter, York. Edward Hailstone died at Walton 24 March 1890, aged 72. He printed a catalogue of his Yorkshire library in 1858, and published Portraits of Yorkshire Worthies, with biographical notices (1869).
