= John Hailstone =

British geologist

John Hailstone FLS, FRS
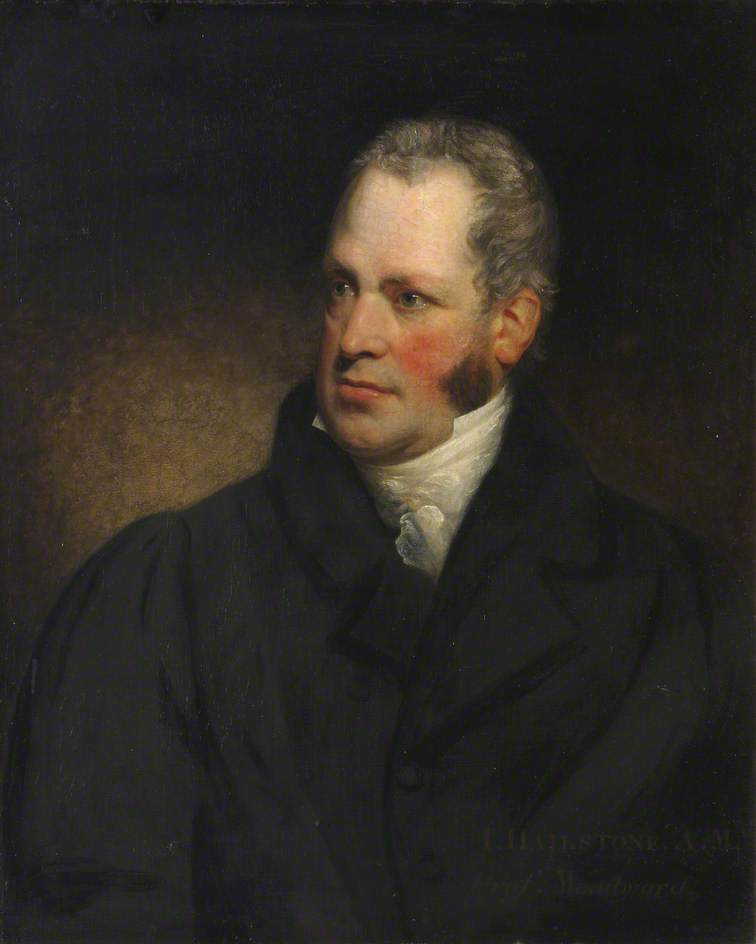
- Born: 15 December 1759; Hoxton, Middlesex, England
- Died: 9 June 1847 (aged 87); Trumpington, Cambridgeshire
- Burial place: St Mary and St Michael Churchyard, Trumpington
- Education: Trinity College, Cambridge
- Occupation: Geologist
- Relatives: Samuel Hailstone (brother)

John Hailstone (13 December 1759 – 9 June 1847) was an English geologist.

== Biography ==
=== Early life ===
Hailstone was born at Hoxton, Middlesex on 13 December 1759 and at an early age he was placed under the care of a maternal uncle at York, and was sent to Beverley school in the East Riding. Samuel Hailstone, the botanist, was a younger brother. John went to Cambridge, entering first at Catharine Hall, and afterwards at Trinity College, and was second wrangler and second in the Smith's Prize of his year (1782). He was second in both competitions to James Wood who became master of Saint John's, and Dean of Ely.

=== Career ===
Hailstone was elected fellow of Trinity in 1784, and four years later became Woodwardian Professor of Geology. He held the Woodwardian chair for over thirty years, standing down in 1818 so that he could marry (the terms of appointment at that time required that the incumbent be unmarried).

He went to Germany, and studied geology under Werner at Freiburg for about twelve months. On his return to Cambridge he devoted himself to the study and collection of geological specimens, but did not deliver any lectures. He published, however, in 1792, ‘A Plan of a course of lectures’. The museum was considerably enriched by him.

He was elected to the Linnean Society in 1800, and to the Royal Society in 1801. When the Geological Society was founded, Hailstone was one of the forty-two people elected as honorary members.

Hailstone contributed papers to Transactions of the Geological Society (1816, iii. 243–50), Transactions of the Cambridge Philosophical Society (1822, i. 453–8), and the British Association (Report, 1834, p. 569).

=== Later life ===
He married, and retired to the vicarage of Trumpington, near Cambridge, in 1818, and worked zealously for the education of the poor of his parish. He devoted much attention to chemistry and mineralogy, as well as to his favourite science, and kept for many years a meteorological diary. He made additions to the Woodwardian Museum, and left manuscript journals of his travels at home and abroad, and much correspondence on geological subjects.

He died at Trumpington on 9 June 1847, in his 88th year.

== Attribution ==
- This article incorporates text from a publication now in the public domain: "Hailstone, John". Dictionary of National Biography. London: Smith, Elder & Co. 1885–1900.

Academic offices
Preceded by Thomas Green	Woodwardian Professor of Geology, University of Cambridge; 1788-1818	Succeeded by Adam Sedgwick
