= Calefactory =

Area in a medieval monastery containing a communal fire

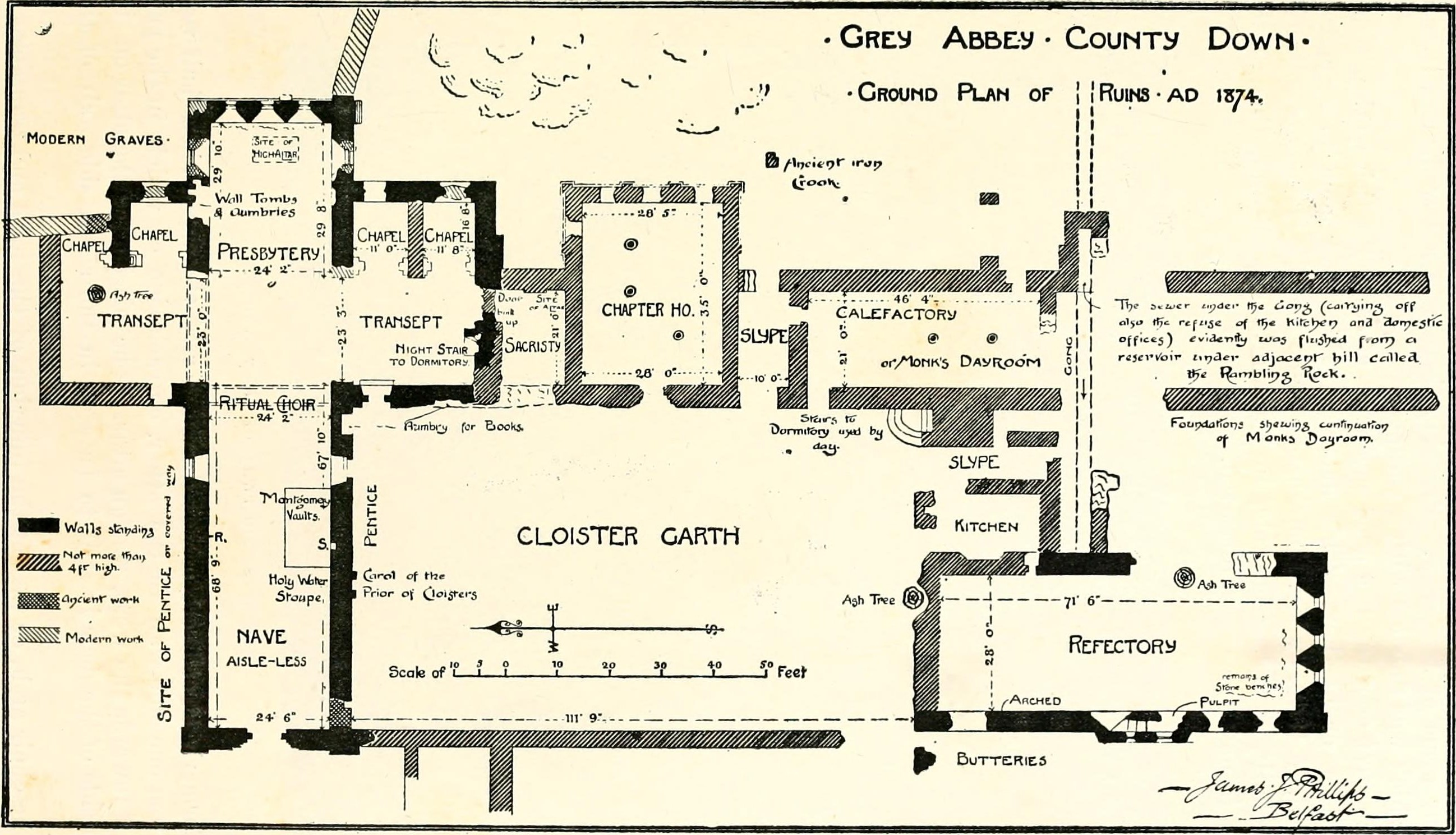
Plan of Grey Abbey in County Down, Northern Ireland. Note the calefactory in the southeast corner (upper right on the map).

The calefactory (Latin: calefactorius, also warming house) was an important room or building in a medieval monastery in Western Europe. In the present day it is a communal place of recreation and fellowship in religious houses such as monasteries, priories, and convents.

== Monasteries in the medieval period ==
In this period the calefactory had a communal fire kept ablaze so that the monks could warm themselves after long hours of study in the (unheated) cloister or other work. In the Early Middle Ages, this was one of the few heated rooms in the monastery – the others being the infirmary, the guest house and the kitchen. This policy was generally relaxed, save for a few very strict orders, by the latter part of the medieval period when fireplaces became common throughout the claustral buildings.

The warming house was always one of the buildings surrounding the cloister and was entered from it. It was often located close to the refectory so that the warmth could be shared by the monks when they were eating. In many monasteries, an upper floor was built over the warming house that served as the muniment room, where the house's charters, deeds and other legal documents were kept safe from damp.

== Present day ==
In the present day, monasteries, priories, convents and other religious houses often have a calefactory as a place where social gatherings or meetings, councils, or chapters are held. The uses for each will depend on the customary of each house.
