= List of rectors of Exeter College, Oxford =

The following is a list of rectors of Exeter College, Oxford.

== Rectors of Exeter College ==
=== 1318–1566 ===
- John Parys (1318–1319)
- Stephen de Pippecote (1322–1325)
- John de Sevenaysshe (1325–1326)
- John de Kelly (1326–1327)
- Richard de Pyn (1327–1330)
- Henry de Tiverton (1333–1344)
- William Dobbe (1334–1335)
- William de Palmorna (1336–1337)
- John de Blankeswille (1344)
- Robert de Trethewy (1354 – June 1357)
- John Halle (1357 – Spring 1359)
- John Wiseburg (May – October 1359)
- Robert de Clyste (1359–1365)
- Robert Blakedon (1365–1366)
- John Otery (1367)
- Thomas de Kelly (1368–1369)
- William Franke (1370–1371)
- John Dagenet (1371–1372)
- Robert de Lydeford (1373–1374)
- Martin Lydeford (1374)
- John More (1374–1375)
- Thomas Worth (1375–1377)
- Thomas White (1377–1378)
- Richard Browne (1378–1379)
- Lawrence Stevine (1379 – March 1380)
- William Talkarn or Talcaryn (March – October 1380)
- William Slade (1380–1384)
- Thomas Dyre (1385–1389)
- Thomas Hyndeman (16 October 1389 – 2 April 1390)
- Richard Mark or Marks (2 April 1390 – 1391)
- Helias Stoke (14 October 1391 – 1393)
- Robert Marschel (11 October 1393 – 1394)
- John Gynne (1395–1399)
- John Jakys (11 October 1399 – 1400)
- Richard Penwyne (1400–1401)
- Geoffrey Prentys (1401–1402)
- John Cowling (1402–1404)
- John Schute (1404–1405)
- Thomas Noreys (1405–1406)
- William Penbegyll (1406–1407)
- William Fylham (1407–1408)
- William Grene (1409–1411)
- Walter Trengoff (1411–1413)
- Benedict Brente (1413–1414)
- William Fylham (1415)
- John Alwarde (1416–1417)
- Henry Whitehead (1417–1418)
- John Alwarde (1418–1419)
- Ralph Morewyll (1419–1422)
- Edmund Fitchet (1422–1424)
- John Colyforde (1425)
- William Palmer (1425–1432)
- John Rowe (1433–1440)
- John Rygge (1440–1441)
- John Lyndon (1441–1442)
- John Westlake (1442–1443)
- John Evelyn (1443–1447)
- Richard French (1449–1453)
- Walter Windsor (1453–1457)
- William Mogys or Mogas (1457–1459)
- William Thomas (1459–1460)
- William Baron (1460–1464)
- John Phylypp (1464–1470)
- William Major (1471–1474)
- Richard Bradleghe (1475 – 14 March 1478)
- William Mylplaysh (14 March – 14 July 1478)
- John Orelle or Oryal (4 July 1478 – 1479)
- William Meryfeld (1479–1480)
- James Babbe (1482–1484)
- John Smythe (1485–1487)
- Thomas Ruer (1487–1488)
- Richard Panter (1488 – 20 Decr 1494)
- Richard Roberd or Roberts or Robyns (Lent – Oct 1495)
- John Atwell (1495–1499)
- Thomas Michell (1499–1501)
- John Rugge or Rigge (1501–1502)
- Gerendus Raffe (1503–1504)
- William Bery Bury (1506–1508)
- Symon Todde (1512 – Summer 1514)
- John Rugge or Rigge (1515–1516)
- Thomas Vyvyan (27 Mar 1518 – 8 Oct 1519)
- William Smythe (1519–1521)
- Philip Bale (14 Dec 1521 – 6 Oct 1526)
- Edmund Fletcher (1526–1529)
- John Bere (1529–1531)
- John Pekyns (1531–1534)
- John Bery or Bury (1534–1536)
- John Dotyn (1537–1539)
- John French (25 Oct 1539 – 1542)
- Henry Laurence (17 Oct 1542 – 9 October 1543)
- Augustine Crosse (17 Oct 1543 – 1546)
- William More (17 Oct 1546 – 1553)
- William Corindon or Corydon or Corndon (1553–1555)
- Stephen Marks (17 Oct 1555 – 1556)
- Philip Randell (17 Oct 1556 – 17 Oct 1557)
- Robert Newton (17 Oct 1557 – 17 Oct 1559)
- John Neale (18 Oct 1560 – 1566)

=== 1566–1887 ===
- John Neale (Whitsuntide 1566 – deprived 12 October 1570)
- Robert Newton (31 October 1570 – resigned 4 October 1578 (see above))
- Thomas Glasier (21 October 1578 – d. 9 March 1592)
- Thomas Holland (24 April 1592 – d. 17 March 1612)
- John Prideaux (4 April 1612 – resigned 3 August 1642)
- George Hakewill (23 August 1642 – d. 2 April 1649)
- John Conant (7 June 1649 – deprived 1 September 1662)
- Joseph Maynard (18 September 1662 – resigned 30 April 1666)
- Arthur Bury (27 May 1666 – deprived 26 July 1690)
- William Paynter (15 August 1690 –d. 18 February 1716)
- Mathew Hole (8 March 1716 – d. 19 July 1730)
- John Conybeare (6 August 1730 – resigned 29 January 1733)
- Joseph Atwell (17 February 1733 – resigned 3 March 1737)
- James Edgcumbe (11 April 1737 – d. 16 May 1750)
- Francis Webber (5 June 1750 – d. 29 September 1771)
- Thomas Bray (22 October 1771 – d. 28 March 1785)
- Thomas Stinton (15 April 1785 – d. 6 July 1787)
- Henry Richards (23 July 1797 – d. 19 December 1807)
- John Cole (7 January 1808 – d. 13 October 1819)
- John Collier Jones (6 November 1819 – d. 7 August 1838)
- Joseph Loscombe Richards (1 September 1838 – d. 27 February 1854)
- John Prideaux Lightfoot (18 March 1854 – d. 23 March 1887)

=== Since 1887 ===
- William Jackson Jr (15 April 1887 – resigned 25 March 1913)
- Lewis Richard Farnell (15 April 1913 – resigned 19 September 1928)
- Robert Ranulph Marett (10 October 1928 – d. 18 February 1943)
- Eric Arthur Barber (26 September 1943 – 1956)
- Sir Kenneth Clinton Wheare (1956 – resigned 1972)
- Greig Barr (1972 – resigned 1982) (d. 23 April 2008)
- The Lord Crowther-Hunt (1982 – d. 16 February 1987)
- Sir Richard Norman (1987 – d. 6 June 1993)
- Marilyn Butler (1993–2004)
- Dame Frances Cairncross (2004–2014)
- Sir Rick Trainor (2014–2024)
- Dr Andrew Roe CB (October 2024)
