= Henry Richards =

Henry Richards may refer to:

- Henry Richards (priest) (1747–1807), clergyman and academic administrator at the University of Oxford
- Henry Brinley Richards (1817–1885), Welsh composer
- Henry Caselli Richards (1884–1947), Australian geologist
- Henry deCourcy Richards, American architect
- Henry Charles Richards (1851–1905), British member of parliament for Finsbury East
- Henry Richards (Queensland politician) (1821–1868), member of the Queensland Legislative Assembly
- Henry Erle Richards (1861–1922), professor of law and diplomacy
- Henry Richards (British Army officer) (1812–1864), British Army officer
- Henry Richards (cricketer) (born 1967), New Zealand cricketer
- Henry Melchior Muhlenberg Richards (1848–1935), American military officer

== See also ==
- Harry C. Richards (1908–1980), American horse racing jockey
- Henry Richard (1812–1888), minister and politician
