= John French (academic) =

English academic administrator

John French was an Oxford college head in the 16th-century.

French was educated at Exeter College, Oxford, graduating B.A. in 1530 and M.A. in 1533. He was appointed a Fellow of Exeter in 1530. He was Principal of Hart Hall from 1535 to 1539; and Rector of Exeter College from 1539 to 1542. A priest, he was also the Chaplain of Eton College.
