= Henry Laurence (academic) =

English academic administrator

Henry Laurence was an Oxford college head in the 16th-century.

== Life and career ==
Laurence was educated at Exeter College, Oxford, graduating B.A. in 1530 and M.A. in 1532. He was appointed a Fellow of Exeter in 1530. He was Rector of Exeter College from 1541 to 1543. He was also a priest.
