= Greig Barr =

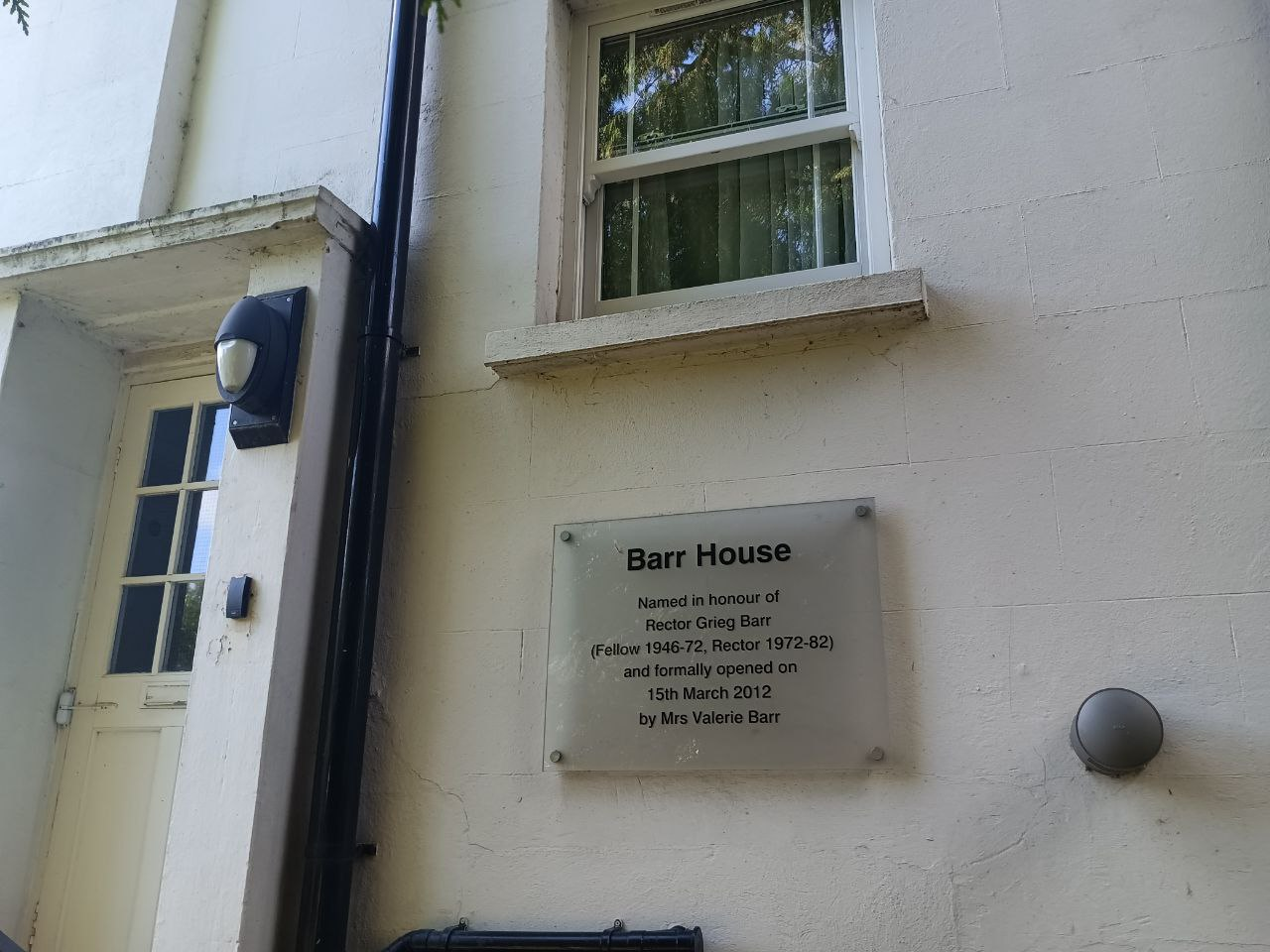
House named after Greig Barr in Oxford

(William) Greig Barr (b Glasgow 10 June 1917; d Oxford 23 April 2008) was an Oxford college head.

Barr was educated at Kelvinside Academy, Sedbergh School and Magdalen College, Oxford. He served in the Second World War with the Royal Devon Yeomanry. A historian, he was a Fellow of Exeter College, Oxford, from 1945 1972; and Rector of Exeter College, Oxford, from 1972 to 1982.

Academic offices
Preceded by Kenneth Clinton Wheare	Rector of Exeter College, Oxford; 1972–1982	Succeeded by Norman Crowther Hunt
