= Star of Bethlehem (painting) =

Painting by Edward Burne-Jones

The Star of Bethlehem
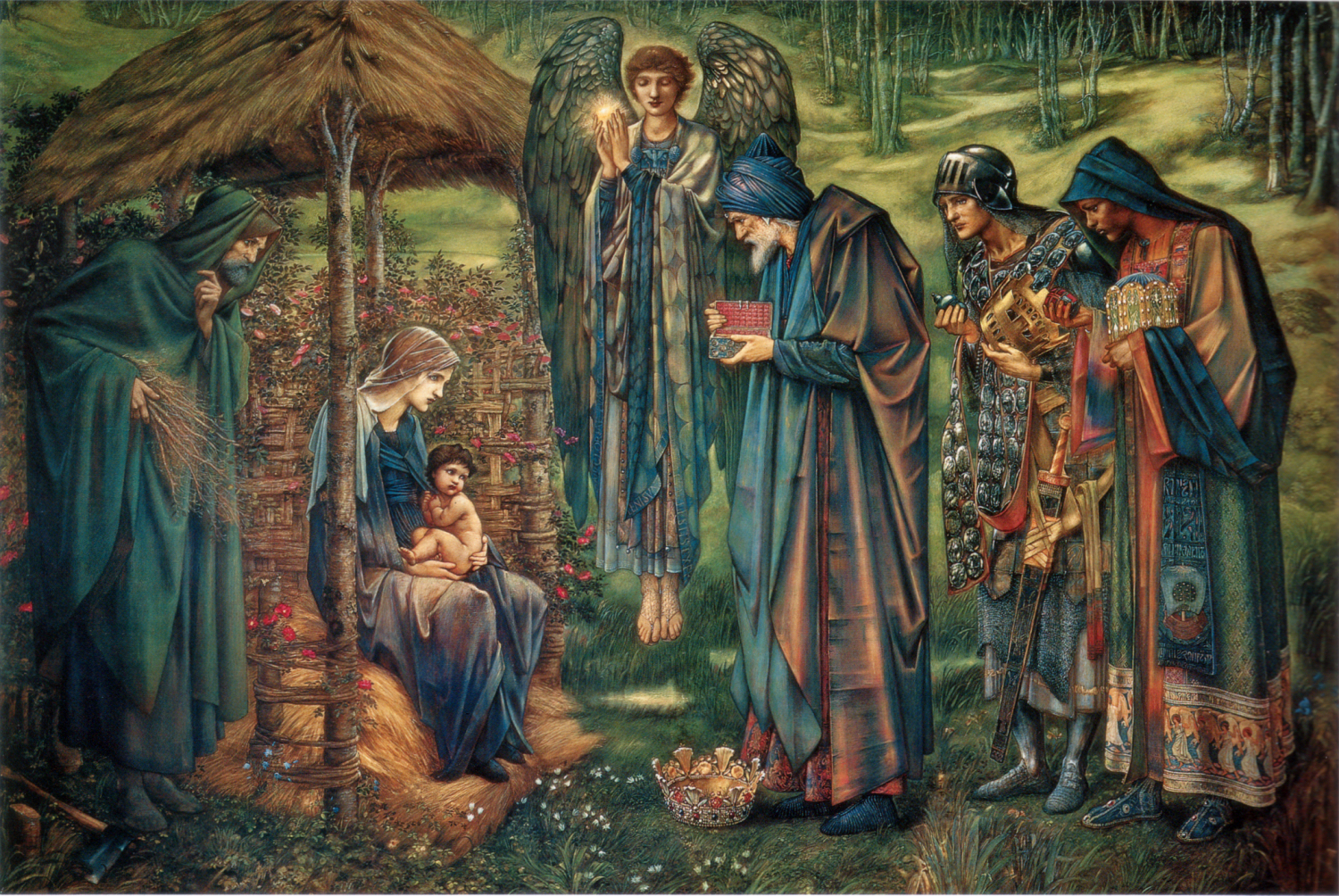
- Artist: Edward Burne-Jones
- Year: c.1885–1890
- Type: watercolor and gouache
- Dimensions: 260 cm × 390 cm (101 in × 152 in)
- Location: Birmingham Museum & Art Gallery, Birmingham

The Star of Bethlehem is a painting in watercolour by Sir Edward Burne-Jones depicting the Adoration of the Magi with an angel holding the star of Bethlehem. It was commissioned by the Corporation of the City of Birmingham for its new Museum and Art Gallery in 1887, two years after Burne-Jones was elected Honorary President of the Royal Birmingham Society of Artists. At 101 1/8 by 152 inches (2,570 mm × 3,860 mm), The Star of Bethlehem was the largest watercolour of the 19th century. It was completed in 1890 and was first exhibited in 1891.

== Origin of the composition ==
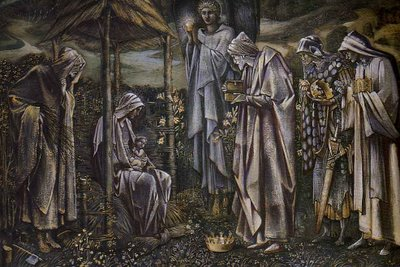
Design for the Adoration of the Magi tapestry, 1887

In 1886, John Prideaux Lightfoot had approached William Morris and Burne-Jones to create a tapestry as a gift for their alma mater Exeter College, Oxford, suggesting the Adoration of the Magi as a subject. The two quickly agreed. Burne-Jones completed a 26 × 38 inch modello or design in watercolour and bodycolour heightened with gold in 1887. Morris and his assistant John Henry Dearle based the cartoons for the tapestry weavers on Burne-Jones's watercolour, changing the colour scheme and adding background details including the flowering plants characteristic of Dearle's tapestry work. The Adoration of the Magi tapestry was woven by Morris & Co. at Merton Abbey over the next two years and displayed in their London showrooms at Easter 1890 before being presented to Exeter College.

The Adoration was ultimately the most commercially successful of all Morris & Co. tapestries. Of the ten versions woven, one is in Eton College Chapel, one in the Hermitage Museum, St Petersburg, one in the Art Gallery of South Australia, and one at Manchester Metropolitan University. The original hangs in the Exeter College Chapel.

== The painting ==
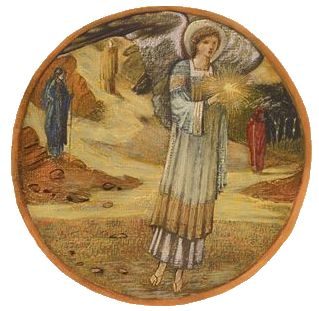
Star of Bethlehem, from The Flower Book.

The Birmingham commission gave Burne-Jones an opportunity to revisit his tapestry design as a full-scale painting. The colour palette with its rich blue-greens differs greatly from both the original watercolour modello and the Morris tapestry, and its large size allowed him to add a wealth of fine detail not possible in the tapestry version, especially in the clothing. Burne-Jones worked on a ladder, and wrote "a tiring thing it is physically to do, up my steps and down..." A photograph by Barbara Leighton Sotheby, preserved as a platinum print by Frederick Hollyer, shows Burne-Jones on his ladder in front of the work-in-progress. The Star of Bethlehem was completed in 1890 and exhibited at the New Gallery, London, in the spring of 1891 before being sent on to the Birmingham Museum & Art Gallery, where it remains.

Burne-Jones used a different pose of the angel holding the star, this time in a warm colour palette, to illustrate the wildflower called Star of Bethlehem (Ornithogalum umbellatum) in The Flower Book, a collection of watercolours on themes inspired by the names of flowers that he completed between 1882 and 1898.

== See also ==
- List of paintings by Edward Burne-Jones
