= John Neal (disambiguation) =

John Neal (1793–1876) was an American writer, critic, and activist

John Neal may also refer to:

- John R. Neal (1836–1889), American politician
- John Randolph Neal Jr. (1876–1959), American lawyer
- John Neal (British politician) (1889–1962), British judge and politician
- John Neal (Welsh footballer) (1899–1965), Welsh international footballer
- John Neal (cricketer) (1926–2012), English cricketer
- John Neal (footballer, born 1932) (1932–2014), English football player and manager
- John Neal (businessman), British insurance executive, chief executive of Lloyd's of London
- John Neal (footballer, born 1966), English football player for Millwall and Barnet

== See also ==
- John Baldwin Neil (1842–1902), governor of Idaho Territory
- John Neale (disambiguation)
- John Neill (disambiguation)
