= John Neale =

John Neale may refer to:

- Sir J. E. Neale (John Ernest Neale, 1890–1975), British historian
- John Neale (academic) (fl. 1556–1570), Oxford college head
- John Neale (bishop) (1926–2020), inaugural Bishop of Ramsbury, 1974–1988
- John Neale (MP) (1687–1746), MP for Coventry and Wycombe
- John Henry Neale II (1896–1961), American shipping executive
- John Mason Neale (1818–1866), English divine, scholar and hymn-writer
- John Preston Neale (1780–1847), English architectural draughtsman
- John Neal (1793–1876), American writer, critic, editor, lecturer, and activist whose last name was misspelled "Neale" in some publications

== See also ==
- John Neal (disambiguation)
- John Neill (disambiguation)
