= Joseph Maynard (academic) =

Joseph Maynard, D.D. was an Oxford college head in the 17th-century.

Maynard was educated at Exeter College, Oxford and was a Fellow from 1625 to 1653. He was Rector there from 18 September 1662 until his resignation on 30 April 1666. An ordained Anglican priest, he was ordained in 1633 and held livings at Loddington, Bampton and Menheniot. He died in 1670
