= Mathew Hole =

Mathew Hole, D.D. was an Oxford college head in the 18th century.

Hole was educated at Exeter College, Oxford and was appointed a Fellow in 1663. He was Rector from 1715 until his death on 19 July 1730. An ordained Anglican priest, he held livings at Bishop's Lavington, Stogursey and Fiddington.
