= John Bery =

John Bery was an Oxford college head in the 16th-century.

Bery was educated at Exeter College, Oxford, graduating B.A. in 1523 and M.A. in 1526. He was appointed a Fellow of Exeter in 1526; and was Rector from 1534 to 1536. A priest, he held the living at Exmouth until his death in 1558.
