= Robert Newton (English academic administrator) =

Robert Newton was an Oxford college head in the 16th-century.

Newton was educated at Exeter College, Oxford, graduating B.A. in 1552, M.A. in 1557 and B.D. in 1575. He was Rector of Exeter from 1557 to 1559. A priest, he held the living at Bugbrooke.
