= Augustine Crosse =

Augustine Crosse was an Oxford college head in the 16th-century.

Crosse was educated at Exeter College, Oxford, graduating B.A. in 1532 and M.A. in 1535. He was Rector of Exeter College from 1543 to 1546. He was also a priest, and held livings at Modbury, Dorney and Sturminster Marshall.
