= Philip Bale =

English academic administrator

Philip Bale (died 1559) was an Oxford college head in the 16th-century.

Bale was educated at Exeter College, Oxford; and was Rector of Exeter College, Oxford, from 1521 to 1526. He held the living at St Michael, Honiton and St Nicholas, Combe Raleigh. He left patristic works, and books of Bede, to the college.
