= James Edgcumbe =

Oxford college head

James Edgcumbe, D.D. (b Tavistock 17 December 1705; d Oxford 16 May 1750) was an Oxford college head.

Edgcumbe was educated at Exeter College, Oxford and became a Fellow in 1728. He was Rector from 1731 until his death. An ordained Anglican priest, he held the living at Barwick-in-Elmet.
