= William Corindon =

English academic administrator

William Corindon was an Oxford college head in the 16th century.

Corindon was educated at Exeter College, Oxford, graduating B.A. in 1545, M.A. in 1548, and D.D. in 1556. He was a Fellow of Exeter in 1543; and its rector from 1553 to 1555.
