= Joseph Loscombe Richards =

English cleric and academic (1798–1854)

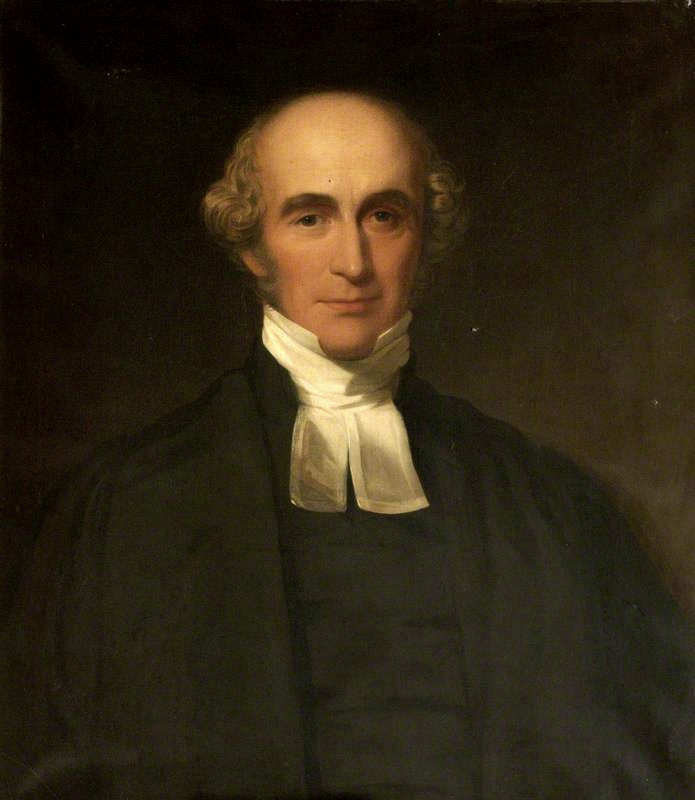
Joseph Loscombe Richards, portrait

Joseph Loscombe Richards, D.D.(b Tamerton Foliot 21 October 1798; d Oxford 21 October 1854) was an Oxford college head in the 19th century.

Richards was educated at Exeter College, Oxford. He was a Fellow there from 1818 to 1837; and Rector from 1838 until his death. An ordained Anglican priest, he was also Rector of Bushey from 1835 to 1838.

Academic offices
Preceded by John Collier Jones	Rector of Exeter College, Oxford; 1838–1854	Succeeded by John Prideaux Lightfoot
