= John Conybeare =

English Bishop and academic

The Right Reverend John Conybeare
- Bishop of Bristol
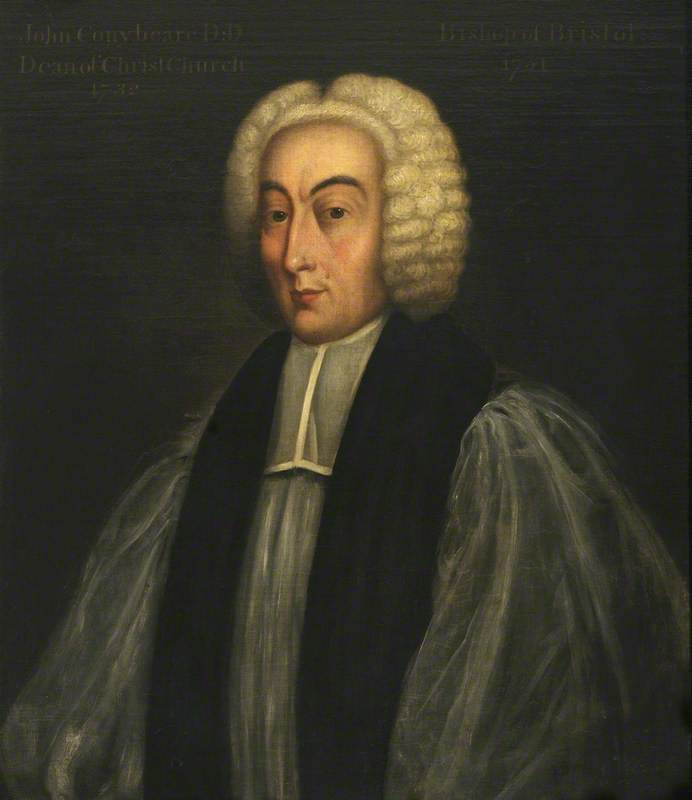
- Diocese: Diocese of Bristol
- In office: 1750–1755
- Predecessor: Joseph Butler
- Successor: John Hume

Personal details
- Born: 31 January 1692
- Died: 13 July 1755 (aged 63)
- Denomination: Anglican
- Education: Exeter College, Oxford

John Conybeare (31 January 1692 – 13 July 1755) was Bishop of Bristol and one of the most notable theologians of the 18th century.

Conybeare was born at Pinhoe, where his father was vicar, and educated at Exeter Free School, Blundell's School and Exeter College, Oxford. He was elected a Probationary Fellow of Exeter College in 1710, took his B.A. degree in 1713 and was appointed a year later as Praelector in Philosophy.

On 27 May 1716 Conybeare was ordained as a priest by the Bishop of Winchester, Sir Jonathan Trelawney and took a curacy in Surrey. He returned to Oxford a year later and became a well known preacher.

His subsequent appointments included:

- Rector of St Clement's Church, Oxford, 1724
- Senior Proctor, Exeter College, Oxford, 1725
- Elected Rector of Exeter College, Oxford, 1730
- Dean of Christ Church, Oxford, 1733
- Bishop of Bristol, 1750

Conybeare was known for the publication of his book Calumny Refuted, an answer to the personal slander of Dr. Richard Newton.

Conybeare was the father of Dr William Conybeare, the well known rector of Bishopsgate, and grandfather to the Anglo-Saxon translator and poet John Josias Conybeare and the geologist William Conybeare. He is buried in Bristol Cathedral.

== Bibliography ==
- A Defence of Revealed Religion Against the Exceptions of a Late Writer in His ntituled Christianity As Old As Creation, against Matthew Tindal, 1732
- Calumny Refuted: Or, An Answer To The Personal Slanders Published By Dr. Richard Newton, Published for J.J. and P. Knapton [etc.] (London), against Richard Newton, principal of Hart Hall, Oxford, 1735

Academic offices
Preceded by Matthew Hole	Rector of Exeter College, Oxford; 1730–1733	Succeeded by Joseph Atwell
Preceded by William Bradshaw	Dean of Christ Church, Oxford; 1733–1755	Succeeded by David Gregory
Church of England titles
Preceded by Joseph Butler	Bishop of Bristol; 1750–1755	Succeeded by John Hume
