= Thomas Glasier =

Joseph Maynard, DCL was an Oxford college head in the 16th-century.

Glasier was educated at Christ Church, Oxford. He was Fellow and Rector of Exeter College, Oxford, from 1578 until his death on 9 March 1592.
