= Thomas Vyvyan =

English academic administrator

Thomas Vyvyan was an Oxford college head in the 16th-century.

He was a Fellow of Exeter College, Oxford, from 1511 to 1518. He was Rector of Exeter College, Oxford, from 27 March 1518 – 8 October 1519.

His brother, also called Thomas Vyvyan, became Vicar of Bodmin in 1516. As one of the last priors of Bodmin Priory before the reformation, he was responsible for the construction of its steeple as well as a number of buildings in the area, including the rectory house at Withiel, the mansion house at Rialton Grange, and the south roof of Egloshayle church. The pope nominally consecrated him as the Bishop of Megara in Achaia, Greece. His tomb is in St Petroc's Church, Bodmin which survived the dissolution of the priory.
