= Edmund Fletcher =

Edmund Fletcher was an Oxford college head in the 16th-century.

Fletcher was educated at Exeter College, Oxford; and was Rector of Exeter College, Oxford, from 1526 to 1529. He was also Chaplain to the University.
