= John Pekyns =

John Pekyns was an Oxford college head in the 16th century.

Pekyns was educated at Exeter College, Oxford, graduating B.A. in 1523 and M.A. in 1524. He was Rector from 1531 to 1534. A priest, he held the living at Bradwell juxta Mare from 1542 until his deprivation in 1554. He was also a Canon of Westminster.
