= John Bere (academic) =

Oxford college head in the 16th-century

John Bere was an Oxford college head in the 16th-century. He was educated at Exeter College, Oxford, graduating B.A. in 1517 and M.A. in 1520. He was appointed Fellow of Exeter in 1521; and was its Rector from 1529 to 1531. A priest, he held the livings at Endellion and Camborne.
