= William More (academic) =

William More was an Oxford college head in the 16th-century.

More was born in Devon and educated at Exeter College, Oxford, graduating B.A. in 1538 and M.A. in 1541. He was appointed a Fellow of Exeter in 1537. More was Principal of Hart Hall from 1544 to 1545; and Rector of Exeter College from 1546 to 1553. A priest, he held the living at Stoke Rivers.
