= Stephen Marks (academic) =

16th-century English scholar

Stephen Marks was an Oxford college head in the 16th century.

Marks was educated at Exeter College, Oxford, graduating B.A. in 1552, M.A. in 1554, and D.D. in 1559. He became a Fellow of Exeter in 1549; and its rector from 1556 to 1560.
