= John Dotyn =

English academic administrator

John Dotyn was an Oxford college head in the 16th century.

Dotyn was educated at Exeter College, Oxford, graduating B.A. in 1524 and M.A. in 1529. He was appointed a Fellow of Exeter in 1528; and was Rector from 1537 to 1539. A priest, he held the livings at Bampton, St Issey, Whitstone, Aveton Gifford, and Kingsdon. He died on 7 November 1561.
