= Francis Webber =

Anglican Priest and Academic

Francis Webber (20 October 1708 in Honiton – 29 September 1771 in Hereford) was an Anglican priest and academic, an Oxford college head. He was Dean of Hereford from 1756 until his death.

Webber was the son of the Rev. Francis Webber of Clist Honiton, and was born there. He was educated at Exeter College, Oxford. He was a Fellow there from 1728 to 1750; and Rector from 1750 until his death. He held livings at Merton, Burford, Oxford, Newchurch, Isle of Wight and Menheniot.

Church of England titles
Preceded by John Egerton	Dean of Hereford; 1756–1771	Succeeded by Nathan Wetherell
