= William Smythe (academic) =

William Smythe was an Oxford college head in the 16th century.

Smyth was educated at Exeter College, Oxford, and was Rector of that college from 1519 to 1521. He held the living at St Thomas, Salisbury from 1533. He died in 1537.
