= Symon Todde =

16th century Oxford college head

Symon Todde was an Oxford college head in the 16th-century.

He was a Fellow of Exeter College, Oxford, from 1502 to 1512; and Rector of Exeter College, Oxford, from 1512 – 1514.
