= John Rigge =

Oxford college head

John Rigge was an Oxford college head in the 16th-century.

Rigge was educated at Exeter College, Oxford; and was Rector of Exeter College, Oxford, from 1515 to 1516. He held livings at St Michael, Honiton and St Thomas, Exeter. He died in 1537.
