= Philip Randell =

English academic administrator

Philip Randell was an Oxford college head in the 16th-century.

Randall was educated at Exeter College, Oxford, graduating B.A. in 1545 and M.A. in 1548. He became a Fellow of Exeter in 1544. Randell was Principal of Hart Hall from 1549 to 1556; and Rector of Exeter College from 1556 to 1557. He died on 11 March 1599 and is buried at St. Peter-in-the-East, Oxford.
