= Richard Norman (chemist) =

British chemist

Sir Richard Oswald Chandler Norman, KBE FRS (April 27, 1932 – June 6, 1993) was a British chemist.

== Biography ==
Norman was born in Norbury, London. His father Oswald managed a bank in the area. Norman received his primary education at St Paul's School, London. He graduated with a first in chemistry from Balliol College, Oxford in 1955, and the following year joined Merton College, Oxford as a Junior Research Fellow, completing his DPhil in 1957. His doctoral thesis investigated using continuous flow mixing techniques to study rapid free radical reactions. He was elected as a Fellow of Merton College in 1958, lecturing, tutoring and building up a research team.

In 1965 Norman moved to the University of York to create a new chemistry department, where he gained a reputation for the study of organic reactions. In 1987 he returned to Oxford as Rector of Exeter College, Oxford, where he remained until his death.

He married Jennifer Margaret Tope in 1982; they had no children. He died in Oxford in 1993; his body was cremated at Oxford.

== Textbooks and Monographs ==
- Electrophilic Substitution in Benzenoid Compounds (with Roger Taylor) (published 1964)
- Principles of Organic Synthesis (published 1968; 3rd ed. 1993, with James M. Coxon)
- Modern Organic Chemistry (with David J. Waddington) (published 1972; 4th ed. 1983)
- Mechanisms in Organic Chemistry: Case Studies (with Michael J. Tomlinson and David J. Waddington, published 1978)

== Recognitions, honours, awards ==
- President of the Royal Institute of Chemistry (1978–1980)
- President of the Royal Society of Chemistry (1984–1986)
- Elected a Fellow of the Royal Society (1977)
- Appointed (Knight Commander of the Order of the British Empire) (1987 New Year Honours)
- Named as Chief Scientific Adviser to the Ministry of Defence (1983–1988)
- Meldola Medal and Prize, Royal Society of Chemistry (1961)
- Corday–Morgan Medal, Royal Society of Chemistry (1967)

Academic offices
Preceded by The Lord Crowther-Hunt	Rector of Exeter College, Oxford; 1987-1993	Succeeded by Marilyn Butler
