= John Parsons (bishop) =

English churchman and academic

The Right Reverend John Parsons
- Bishop of Peterborough
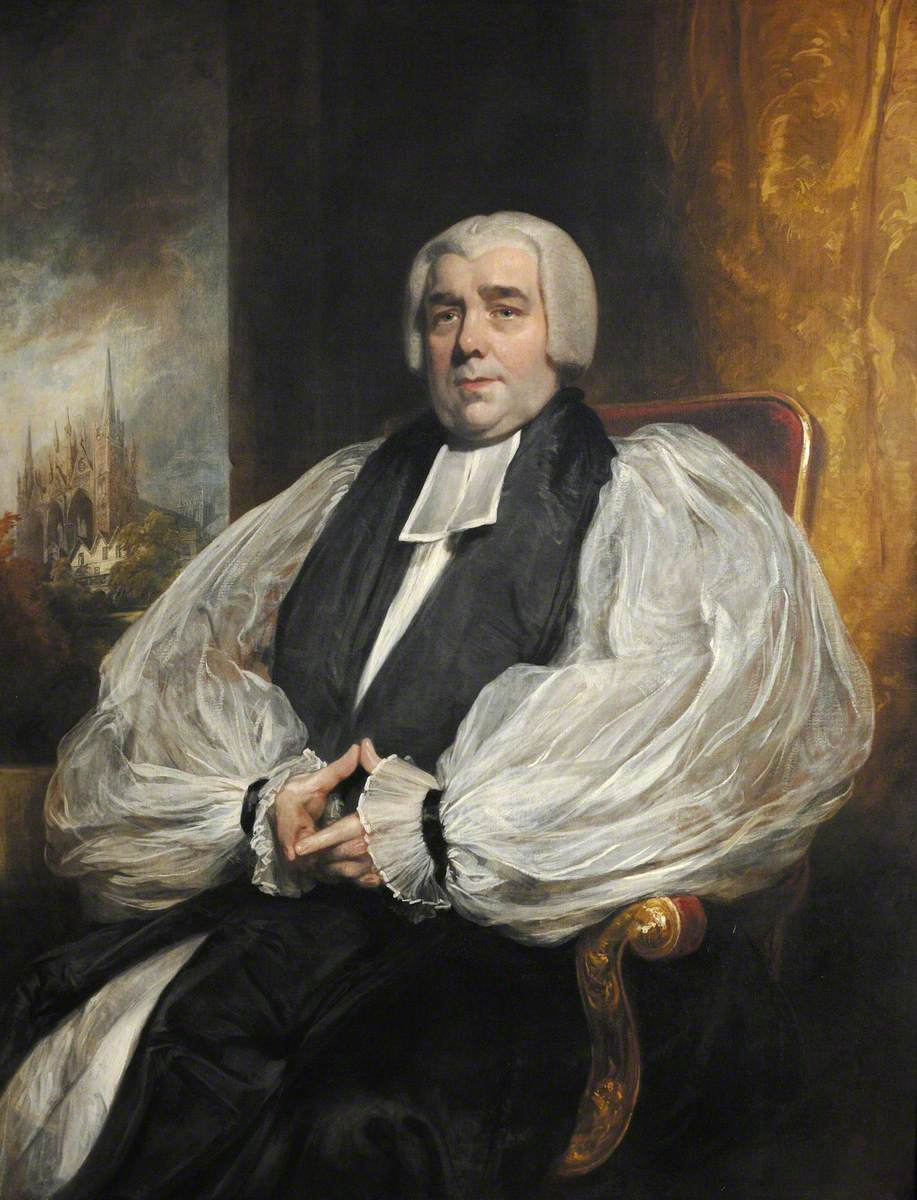
- Portrait by William Owen
- Diocese: Diocese of Peterborough
- In office: 1813–1819
- Predecessor: Spencer Madan
- Successor: Herbert Marsh
- Other post: Dean of Bristol (1810–1813)

Personal details
- Born: baptised 6 July 1761 Oxford
- Died: 12 March 1819 (aged 57) Oxford
- Buried: Balliol College, Oxford
- Denomination: Anglican
- Spouse: Elizabeth Parsons
- Education: Magdalen College School, Oxford
- Alma mater: Wadham College, Oxford

John Parsons (baptised 6 July 1761 – 12 March 1819) was an English churchman and academic, Master of Balliol College, Oxford, from 1798, and Bishop of Peterborough from 1813.

== Life ==
He was son of Isaac Parsons, butler of Corpus Christi College, Oxford, and his wife Alice; born in the parish of St Aldate's, Oxford, he was baptised in St Aldate's Church on 6 July 1761. He received his early education, first at the school attached to Christ Church, Oxford, and subsequently at Magdalen College School. In his 16th year, he was admitted to Wadham College on 26 June 1777, and was elected a scholar of the college on 30 June 1780. He graduated BA in 1782, and MA in 1785. His other degrees were BD and D.D., both in 1799. He was elected Fellow of Balliol College on 29 November 1785, and in July 1797 was presented by the college to the united livings of All Saints and St Leonard's, Colchester. On 14 November 1798, he was elected Master of Balliol, an office he held till his death. From 1807 to 1810, he was Vice-Chancellor of Oxford University.

An academic reformer, he made college examination a reality, and in conjunction with John Eveleigh, Provost of Oriel College he gave a lead to the University, elaborating the examination Statute of 1801, by which university honours were for the first time awarded for real merit; and he was one of the first examiners, the earliest class list under the new system appearing in 1802. He was for many years a leading member of the Hebdomadal board. Richard Jenkyns, who succeeded him as Master, was tutor under him, and when Parsons was made a bishop was appointed Vice-Master, seconding his administration of the College. A letter to The Times on 14 October 1882 from G R Gleig (describing himself as a very old Balliol man) credits Parsons with the initiatives which ultimately led to Balliol College being regarded as the leading College in Oxford.

In national politics, he was a strong Tory, firmly opposed to Catholic emancipation. He was the senior of the three heads of houses who, on the death of William Cavendish-Bentinck, 3rd Duke of Portland in 1809, proposed John Scott, 1st Earl of Eldon for the chancellorship of the university, to which William Grenville, 1st Baron Grenville was elected.

In 1810, he was appointed to the deanery of Bristol, and in 1812 he was presented to the chapter living of Weare in Somerset, which he held in commendam till his death. In 1813, he was raised to the bishopric of Peterborough, on the death of Spencer Madan, helped by the influence of Lord Eldon. He supported the National Society for the Education of the Poor, with Provost Eveleigh; and Parsons, together with Joshua Watson, is credited with drawing up in 1812 the terms of union for the district committees of the provincial schools.

In the House of Lords he seldom spoke, but was active on committees. He died at Oxford on 12 March 1819, and was buried in the chapel of Balliol College, where a monument was erected by John Bacon.

== Works ==
Only two of his sermons were printed; all his manuscript sermons were burnt after his death, by his express desire. In the acrimonious controversy concerning the 1784 Bampton Lectures of Joseph White, the Arabic professor, of which Samuel Badcock was asserted to have been the author, and portions of which were claimed by Samuel Parr, Parsons was appointed one of the arbitrators, but declined to act; and it was believed that he also had a share in the lectures, as Parr knew.

== Family ==
On 22 January 1798, Parsons married Elizabeth Parsons, probably a cousin, at St Aldates church. He left no children by his wife, who survived him.

== Sources ==
- This article incorporates text from a publication now in the public domain: "Parsons, John (1761-1819)". Dictionary of National Biography. London: Smith, Elder & Co. 1885–1900.

Academic offices
Preceded by John Davey	Master of Balliol College, Oxford; 1798–1819	Succeeded by Richard Jenkyns
Preceded by Henry Richards	Vice-Chancellor of Oxford University; 1807–1810	Succeeded by John Cole
Church of England titles
Preceded by Bowyer Sparke	Dean of Bristol; 1810–1813	Succeeded by Henry Beeke
Preceded by Spencer Madan	Bishop of Peterborough; 1813–1819	Succeeded by Herbert Marsh
