= John Collier Jones =

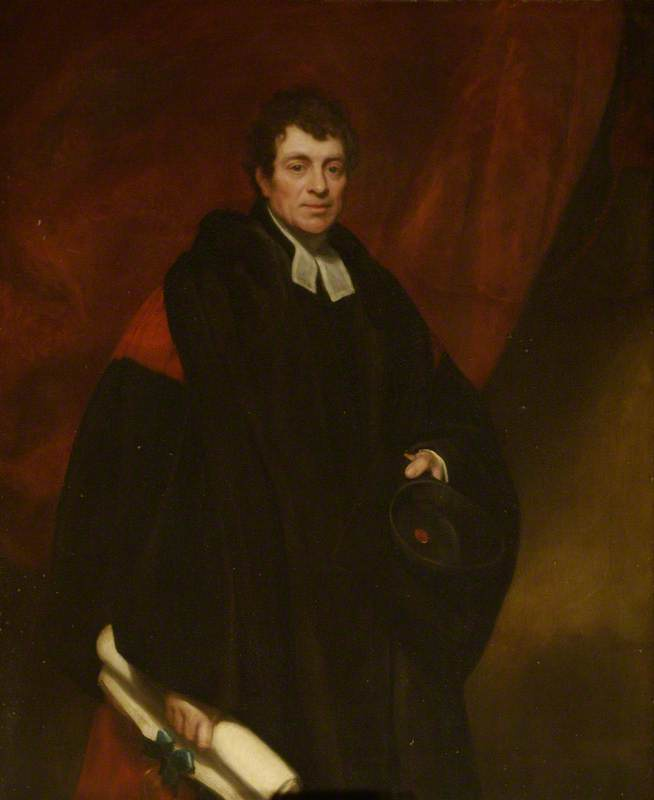
John Collier Jones by Thomas Phillips

John Collier Jones (1770 – 7 August 1838) was an academic administrator at the University of Oxford in England.

The son of Richard Jones of Plympton Erle, Devon, Jones was educated at Exeter College, Oxford, matriculating in 1788 aged 18, graduating B.A. 1792, M.A. 1796, B.D. 1807, D.D. 1819, and holding a fellowship 1792–1799.

He was Rector of Exeter College, Oxford from 6 November 1819 until his death in 1838. He was also Vice-Chancellor of Oxford University from 1828 to 1832.

His portrait was painted by Thomas Phillips and a mezzotint engraving was produced by Samuel Cousins and published by James Ryman in 1834. His papers are in the Bodleian Library at Oxford.

Academic offices
Preceded by John Cole	Rector of Exeter College, Oxford; 1819–1838	Succeeded by Joseph Loscombe Richards
Preceded by Richard Jenkyns	Vice-Chancellor of Oxford University; 1828–1832	Succeeded by George Rowley
