= John Neill =

John Neill may refer to:

- John Neill (archbishop of Dublin) (born 1945), Archbishop of Dublin and Bishop of Glendalough
- John Neill (footballer) (born 1987), Scottish footballer
- John R. Neill (1877–1943), American children's book illustrator
- John W. Neill (1934–2019), British field hockey player
- John Neill (pole vaulter) (1939–2021), Welsh pole vaulter

== See also ==
- John Baldwin Neil (1842–1902), governor of Idaho Territory
- John Neal (disambiguation)
- John Neale (disambiguation)
