= Richard Jenkyns =

Dean at Wells Cathedral (1782–1854)

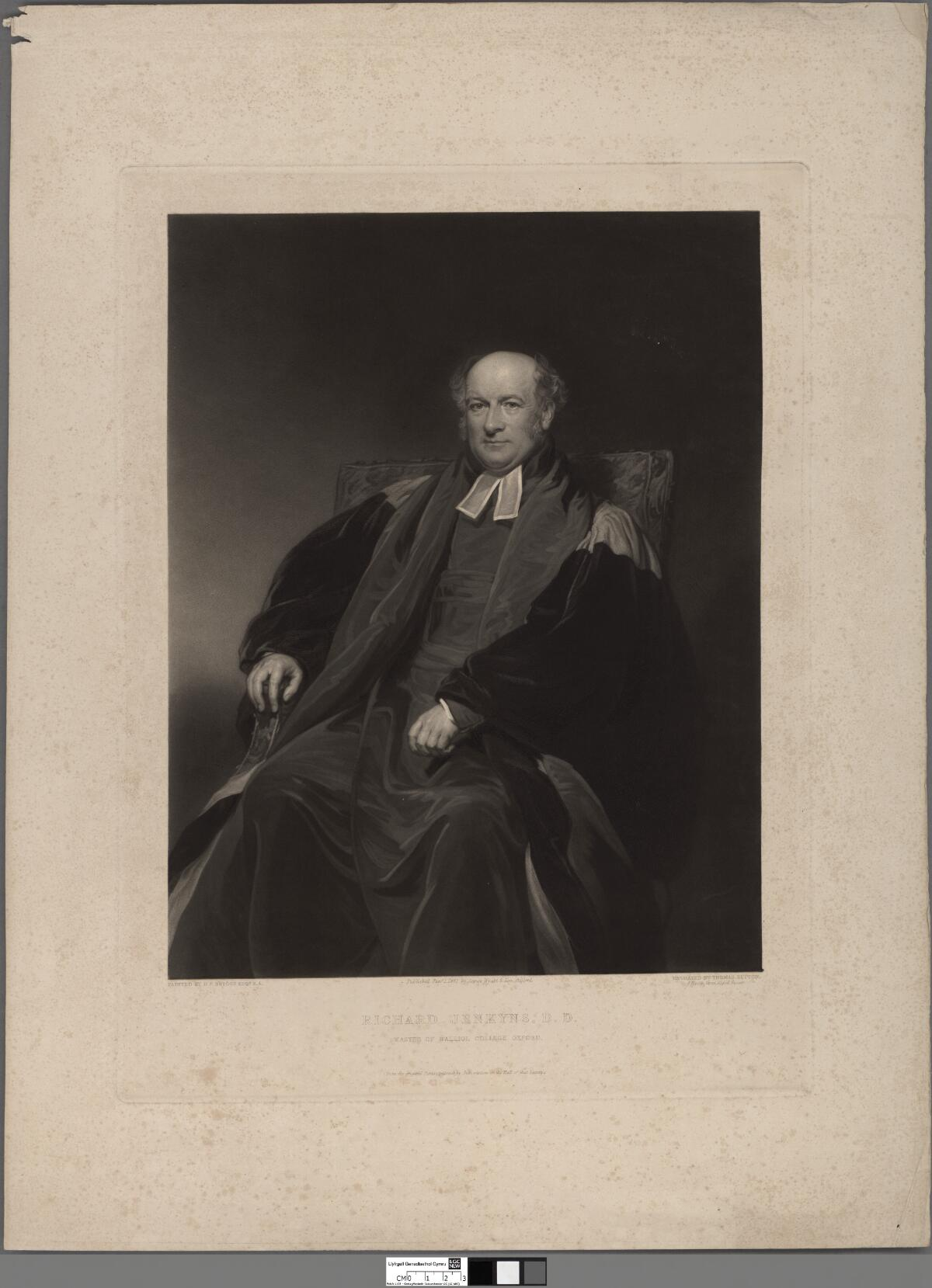

Richard Jenkyns (1782 – 16 March 1854) was a British academic administrator at the University of Oxford and Dean at Wells Cathedral.

== Life ==
Jenkyns was born in Evercreech in Somerset, and was baptised on 21 December 1782. He was the eldest son of John Jenkyns (1753–1824), prebendary of Wells, and his wife Jane (née Banister). He was appointed a Fellow of Balliol College, Oxford, in 1802, and later served as a Tutor in 1813, Bursar in 1814, and Master from 23 April 1819 until his death in 1854. He was awarded a Master of Arts in 1806 and a Doctor of Divinity in 1819.

During his time as Master at Balliol College, Jenkyns also served as Vice-Chancellor of Oxford University from 1824 until 1828. He introduced open competition for scholarships and also raised the standard of Balliol College to the first rank at Oxford. From 1845 to 1854, Jenkyns was also Dean of Wells.

Academic offices
Preceded by John Parsons	Master of Balliol College, Oxford; 1819–1854	Succeeded by Robert Scott
Preceded by George William Hall	Vice-Chancellor of Oxford University; 1824–1828	Succeeded by John Collier Jones
Preceded by Edmund Goodenough	Dean of Wells; 1845–1854	Succeeded by George Johnson
