= Bois des Moutiers =

Botanical garden in Normandy, France

Coordinates: 49°54′42″N 0°58′59″E

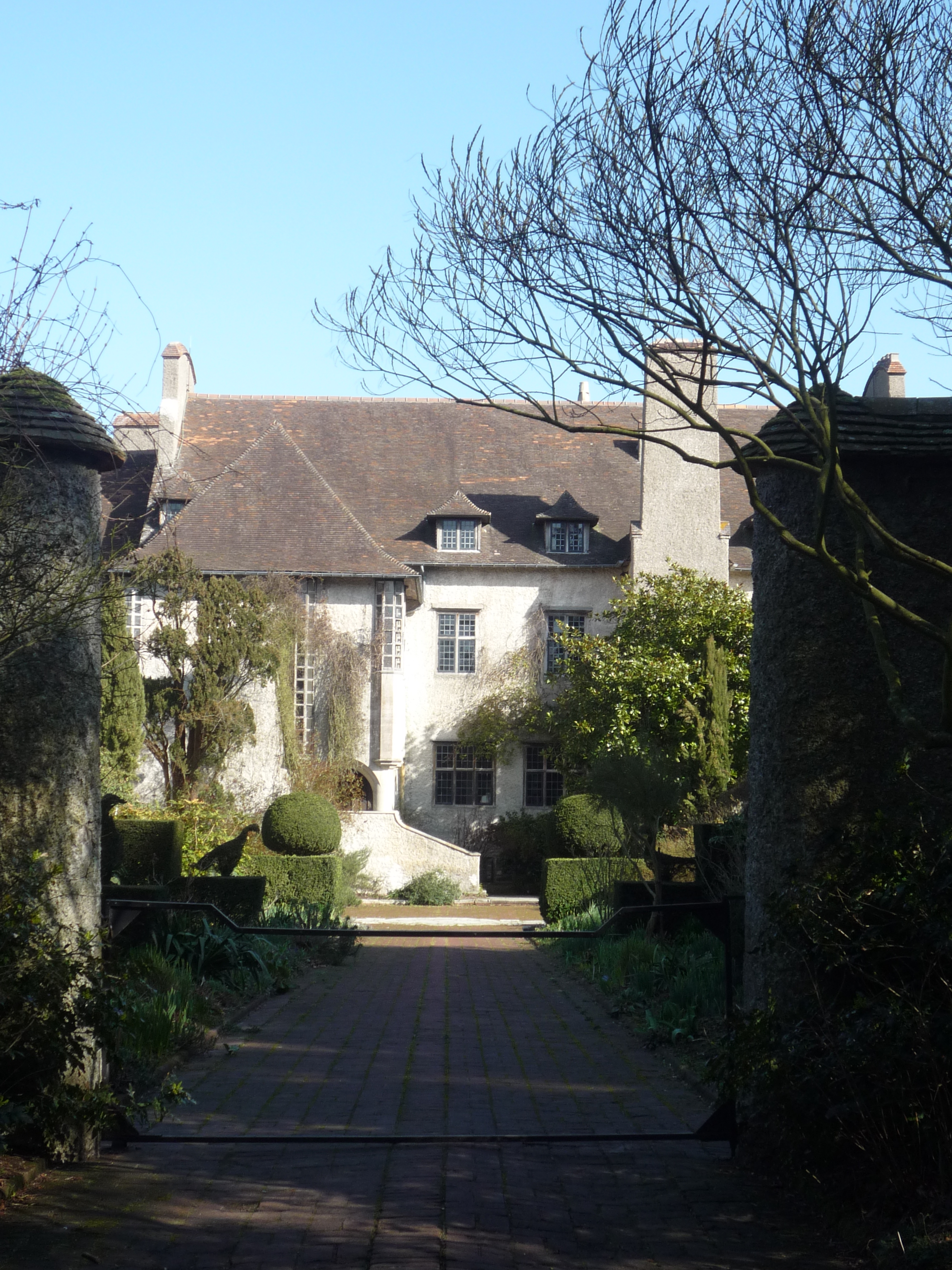
Manor house within the estate

The Bois des Moutiers is located in Varengeville-sur-Mer, Normandy, France. This estate of 30 acres (0.12 km^{2}) is well known for its rhododendrons, azaleas and magnolias, which were introduced and naturalized among local flora. The house and gardens, both dating from the turn of the 19th and 20th centuries, are a first-class example, unique in France, of the work of the famous English partnership of architect Edwin Lutyens and garden designer Gertrude Jekyll.

A large park overlooking the sea and formal gardens surrounding a manor house make up the Bois des Moutiers. The estate is listed as a historical monument and a Remarkable Garden of France.

== History ==
=== Guillaume Mallet's aim ===
In 1897, Guillaume Mallet became the owner of a large valley overlooking the sea. He acquired the site while it was still wild, and over almost forty years he took great care to create a large park. In 1898 he entrusted Edwin Lutyens, a young British architect, with the enlargement and renovation of his residence and Gertrude Jekyll, a celebrated English garden designer, with the garden arrangement. These two artists acted as one to create a unified work: "the house has been designed to look at the gardens and the gardens have been designed to be looked at from the house".

=== Creation of the estate ===
The original, undistinguished house was built around 1850. It was later extended and substantially remodelled in the Arts-and-Crafts style by Edwin Lutyens. This style is characterized by a desire to recognise the importance of the materials, to create unique, relatively plain works, and above all by a reminder that craft deserves to be considered as a work of art. Consistent with this, the buildings of the Bois des Moutiers are conceived as a full-fledged work where every detail of wrought iron and woodwork has been taken care of during their creation. Unfortunately, occupying German troops removed all the iron door handles (by Morris & Co) during World War II. The Adoration of the Magi, a tapestry made by Morris & Co to a design of Edward Burne-Jones, was hidden during the war by the family, who eventually sold it to Yves St Laurent and Pierre Bergé. In 2009 Bergé donated it to the Musée d'Orsay. Many of the original Morris & Co furnishings of the house remain. Besides the entrance to each bedroom is a Pre-Raphaelite portrait in bas-relief on the wall, including one of Jane Morris.

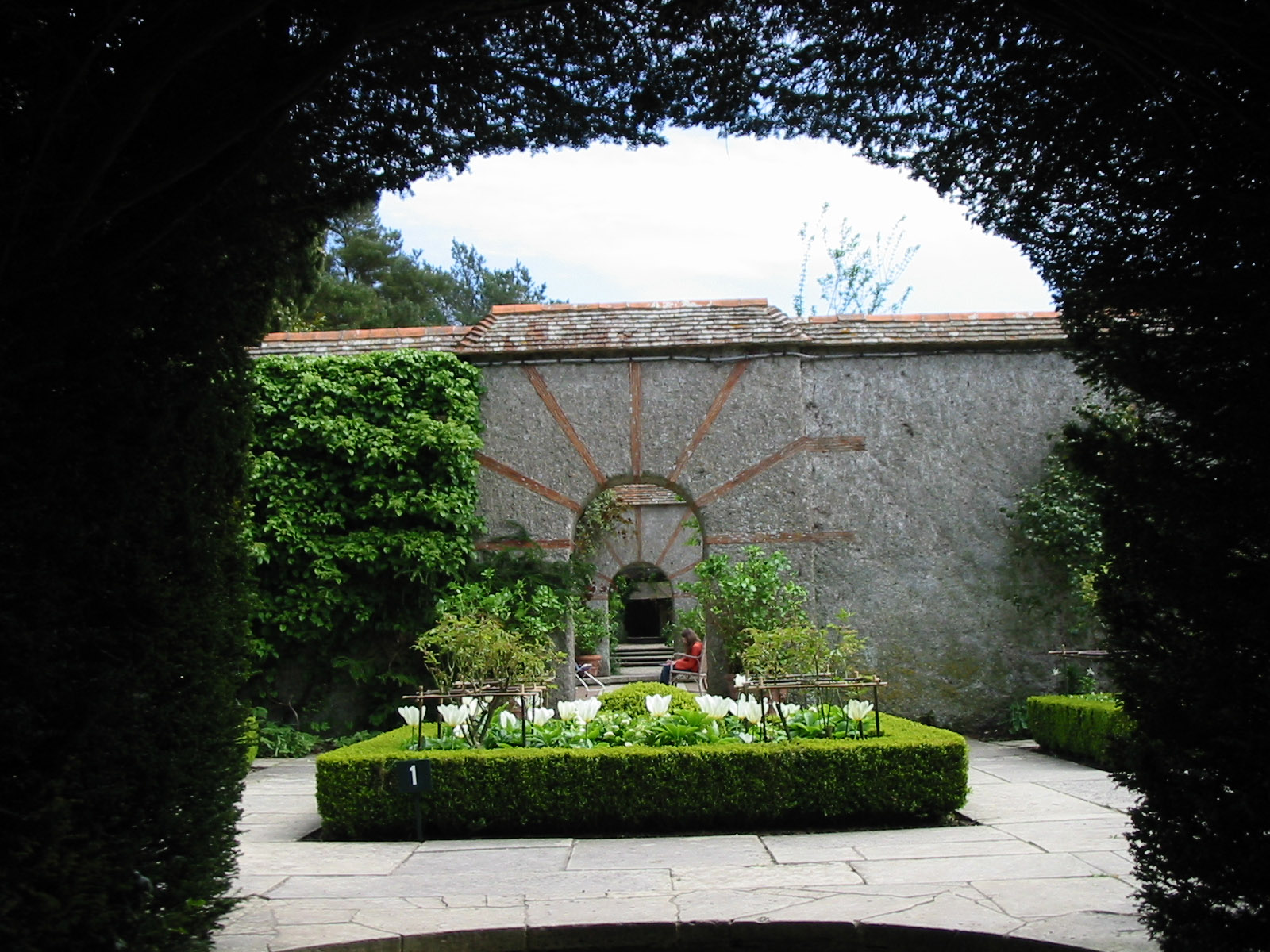
Enclosed areas...

The gardens, seven in all, are enclosed areas (chambres verts – "green rooms" of plants) surrounding the house on the south and east sides. Gertrude Jekyll, their creator, mixed colours and scents together in order to design a unique atmosphere in each of them. The layout of the gardens relates closely to the rooms within the house; for example, the two stone seats set in niches in a yew hedge at the end of the White Garden mirror the arrangement of two small closets and a large mullioned window at the opposite end of the music room. Reflecting the Theosophist philosophy of Guillaume Mallet and his wife, Marie-Adélaïde Grunelius, "it was understood that the architecture and gardens should work together towards the harmonious development of the spirit."

The acidic soil and maritime climate are favourable for introducing species such as Himalayan rhododendrons and azaleas from China. Behind the house, beyond a wide lawn, Guillaume Mallet designed and planted a vast area, which stretches down to the sea cliffs, with a maze of winding paths through a dense woodland of native and exotic trees, sheltering an understorey of rhododendrons and azaleas, hydrangeas, Japanese maples, camellias and magnolias.

=== Public opening ===
Guillaume Mallet and his wife Marie-Adelaïde died in 1946. Their son André and his wife Mary inherited the estate that had been badly damaged during the war. The whole family devoted their energies to restoring the estate to its original condition. In 1970, the Mallet family opened their property to the public. The Bois des Moutiers became the first private garden in France that could be visited by the public. Very soon, it was considered to be one of the most beautiful gardens of France and was listed as a historical monument in 1975 before being awarded the status of a "Remarkable Garden of France". Since its opening, two million people visited the estate.

Visitor numbers declined and by 2011 maintaining the estate had become increasingly difficult for Antoine Bouchayer-Mallet, the then owner, to manage. The inheritance laws of the Code Napoléon meant that ownership was legally divided between 11 people (descendants of the original owners), and in the next generation there would have been many more. The estate was sold in 2019 to a businessman, Jérôme Seydoux, who began major restoration. It is not known whether or when the site will be reopened to the public.

== Gallery ==
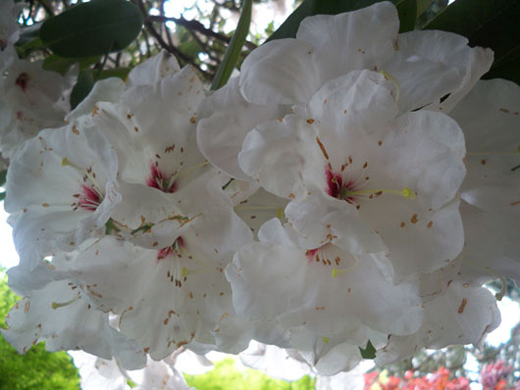
Rhododendron

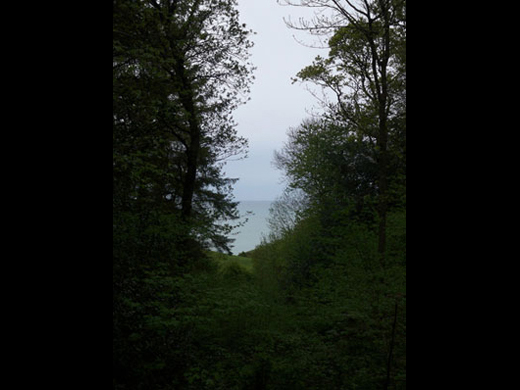
The Bois des Moutiers overlooks the sea

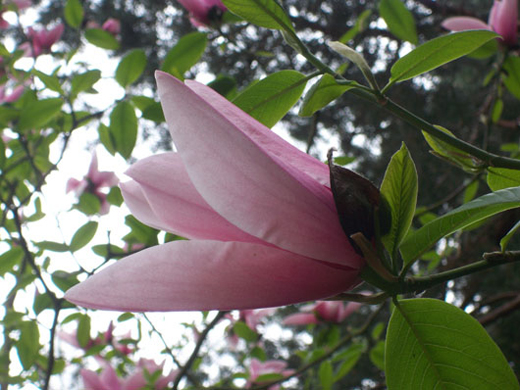
One of many magnolias in the Bois des Moutiers

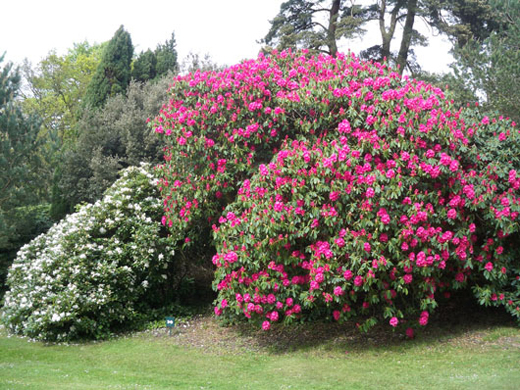
A large rhododendron bordering a clearing
