= John Hume (bishop) =

Bishop of Bristol

The Right Reverend John Hume
- Bishop of Salisbury
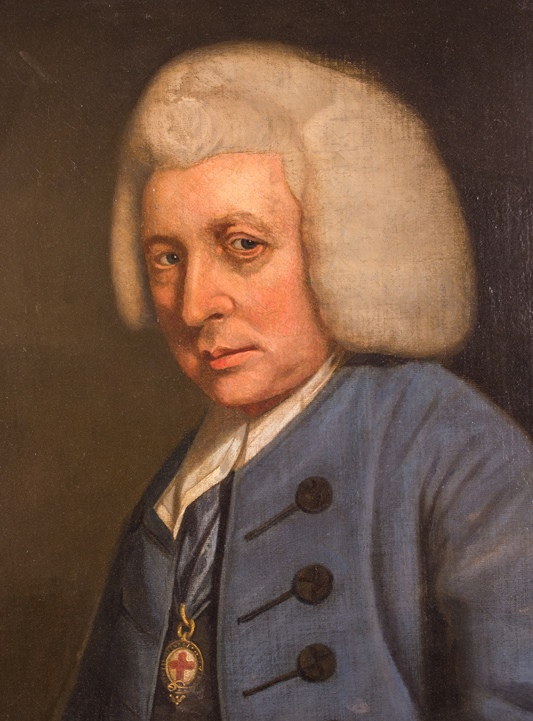
- Diocese: Salisbury
- In office: 1766–1782
- Predecessor: John Thomas
- Successor: Shute Barrington
- Other posts: Bishop of Bristol (1756–1758); Bishop of Oxford (1758–1766); Dean of St Paul's (1758–1766)

Personal details
- Born: c. 1706
- Died: 26 June 1782
- Denomination: Anglican
- Spouse: Lady Mary Hay (m. 1758)
- Education: Merton College, Oxford; Corpus Christi College, Oxford

John Hume DD (c.1703–26 June 1782) was an English bishop.

== Early life and education ==
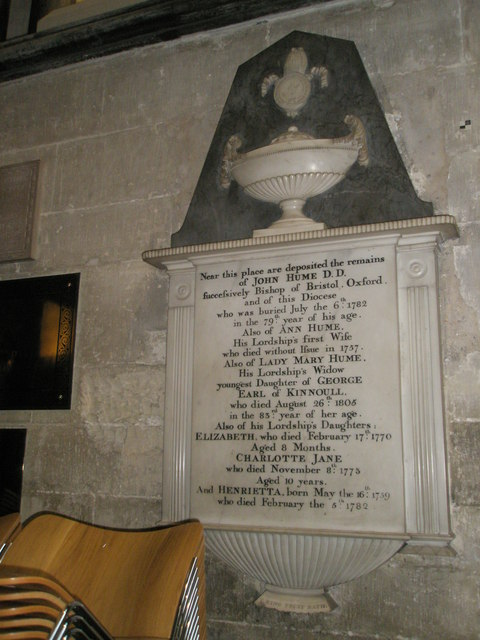
Memorial to Bishop Hume in Salisbury Cathedral

John Hume was the son of Rev. William Hume (1651-1714) of Milton, Devon, and his wife Jane Robertson (d. 1733). Hume matriculated at Merton College, Oxford on 31 March 1721, aged 15. He migrated to Corpus Christi College, Oxford, graduating B.A. 1724, M.A. 1727, B.D. & D.D. 1743.

== Career ==
He became a Canon of Westminster (28 June 1742 – 1748) and a Canon of St Paul's Cathedral (30 March 1748 – 1766).

He was rector of Barnes, London from 1749 to 1758; he was appointed Bishop of Bristol in 1756. In 1758 he became Bishop of Oxford and Dean of St Paul's, and in 1766 Bishop of Salisbury and ex officio Chancellor of the Order of the Garter.

He died on 26 June 1782 and was buried in Salisbury Cathedral on 6 July 1782. The monument was sculpted by William Osmond.

== Family ==
He married twice. His first wife Ann died in 1757 without children. His second wife, Lady Mary Hay (d.1805), youngest daughter of George Hay, 8th Earl of Kinnoull. By his second wife he had three daughters.

Church of England titles
Preceded by John Conybeare	Bishop of Bristol; 1756–1758	Succeeded by Philip Yonge
Preceded by Thomas Secker	Bishop of Oxford; 1758–1766	Succeeded by Robert Lowth
Preceded by Thomas Secker	Dean of St Paul's; 1758–1766	Succeeded by Frederick Cornwallis
Preceded by John Thomas	Bishop of Salisbury; 1766–1782	Succeeded by Shute Barrington
