= John Neale (academic) =

English academic administrator

John Neale was an Oxford college head in the 16th-century.

Neale became a Fellow of Exeter College, Oxford in 1556. He was Rector of Exeter College, Oxford, from 1560 until his deprivation in 1566. He was elected a Fellow of St John's College, Oxford in 1570.
