= Joseph Atwell =

Joseph Atwell, D.D. (12 April 1696, in Buckland Monachorum – 11 August 1768, in Oxford) was an Oxford college head in the 18th century.

Atwell was educated at Exeter College, Oxford and became a Fellow in 1718. He was Rector from 1733 until 1737. An ordained Anglican priest, he held the livings at Oddington and Fairford.
