= Adoration of the Magi (tapestry) =

Tapestry pattern called The Adoration

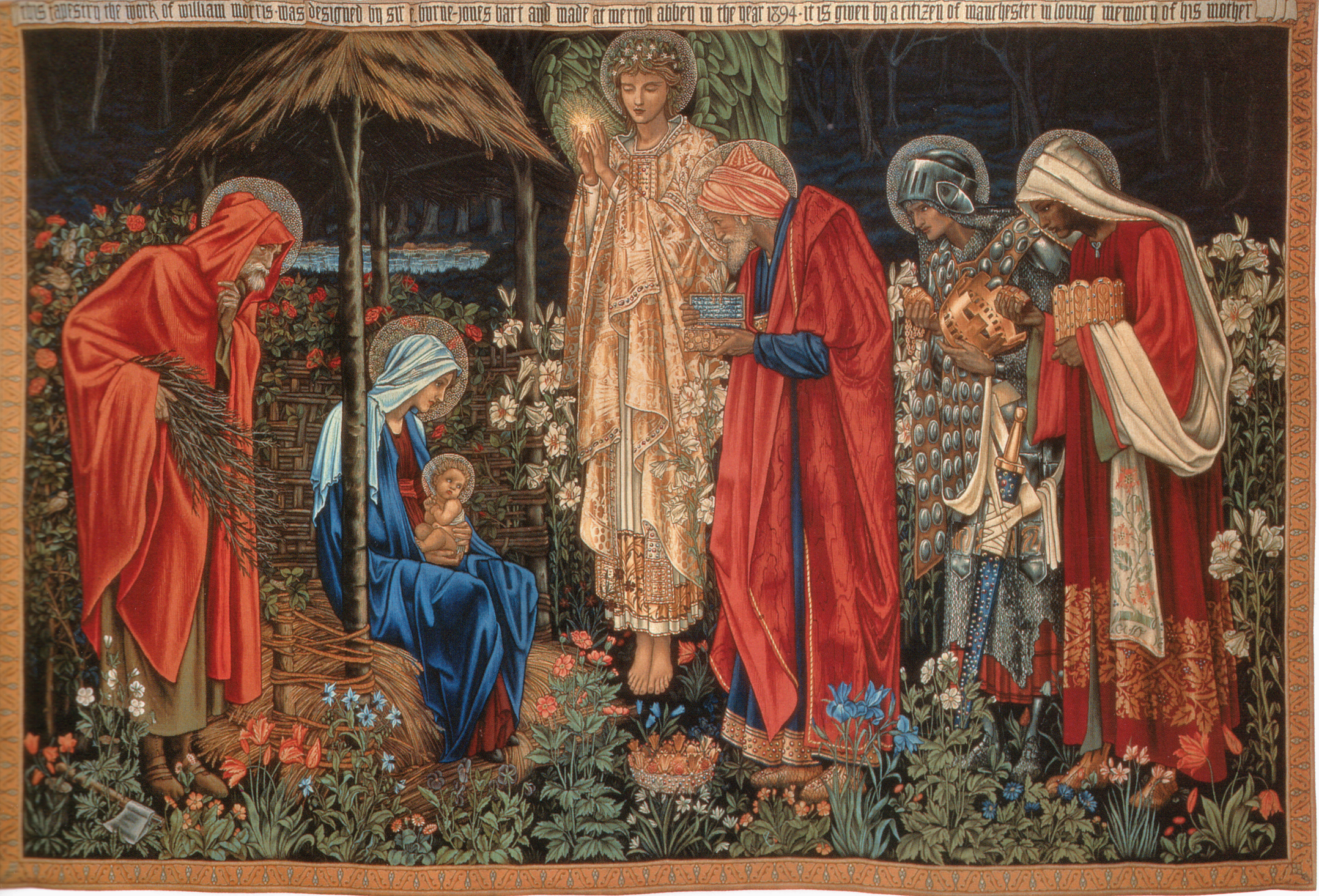
The Adoration of the Magi, copy woven 1894 for the Corporation of Manchester

The Adoration of the Magi is a Morris & Co. tapestry depicting the story in Christianity of the Three Kings who were guided to the birthplace of Jesus by the star of Bethlehem. It is sometimes called The Star of Bethlehem or simply The Adoration.

== Commission ==
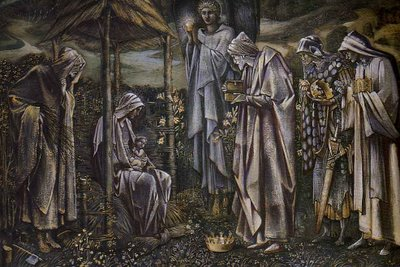
Design for tapestry The Adoration of the Magi, 1887

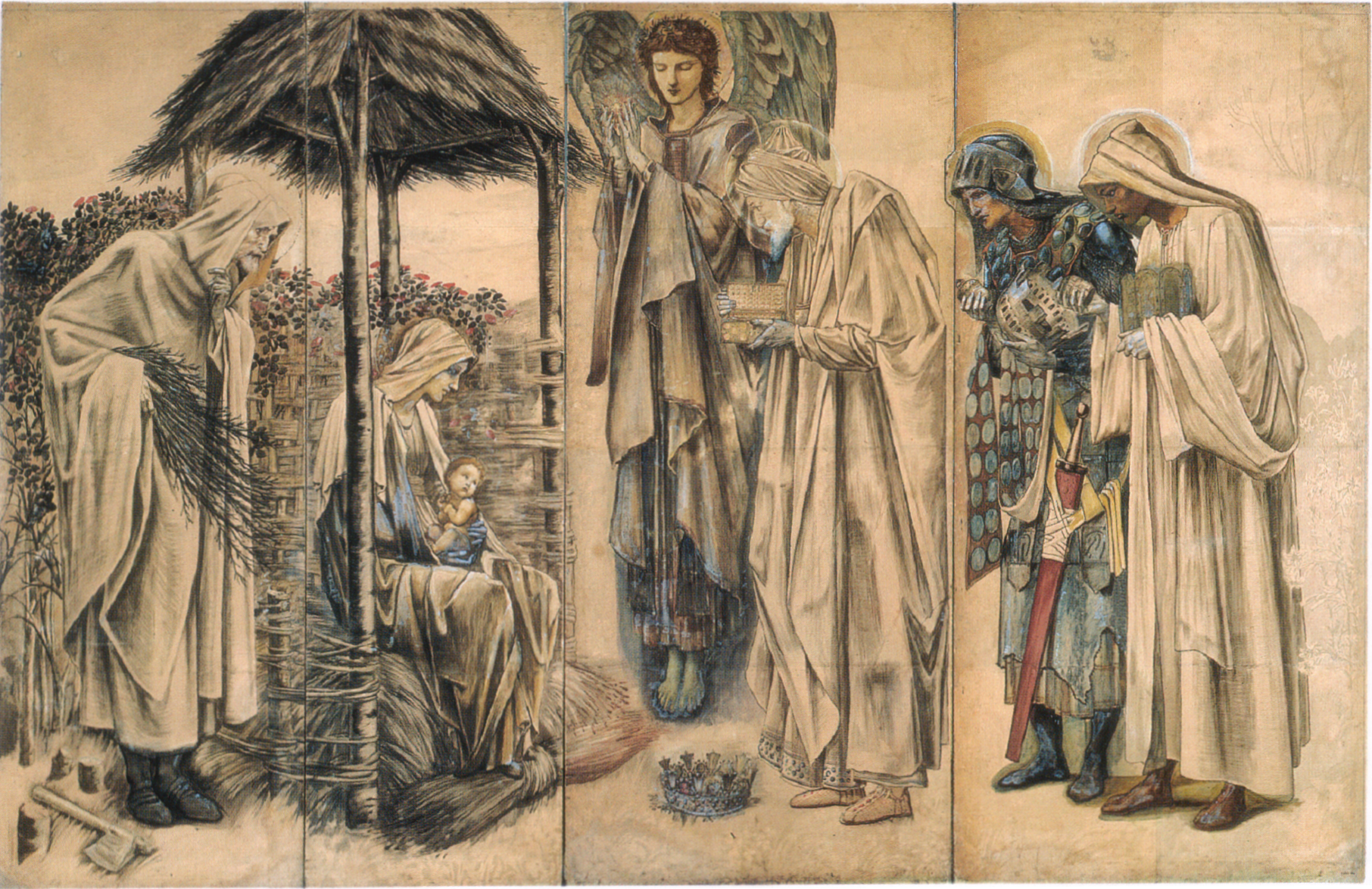
Cartoon for the Adoration tapestry, 1888

The original tapestry was commissioned in 1886 by John Prideaux Lightfoot, rector of Exeter College, Oxford, for the Gothic revival chapel built for the college in the 1850s by George Gilbert Scott. Lightfoot approached William Morris and Edward Burne-Jones, both former students at Exeter, and suggested the subject matter for the tapestry, to which Morris agreed readily in a letter to Lightfoot dated 4 September 1886.

The overall composition and the figures were designed by Edward Burne-Jones, who completed a 26 × 38 inch modello or design in watercolour and bodycolour heightened with gold in 1887. Large-scale cartoons for the tapestry weavers were created from photographically enlarged panels of Burne-Jones's watercolour. In a letter of 7 September 1886, Morris had suggested that the tapestry's colouration should be "both harmonious and powerful, so that it would not be overpowered" by the chapel's brilliantly coloured stained glass. Morris and his assistant John Henry Dearle chose a vibrant colour scheme and added background and foreground details including the flowering plants characteristic of Dearle's tapestry work. All in all, the tapestry took four years to realise, including two years' work by three weavers at Morris's Merton Abbey Mills. The tapestry was completed in February 1890 and displayed in Morris & Co.'s Oxford Street showroom in London that Easter before being presented to Exeter College. Lightfoot did not live to see the finished tapestry; he died at the Rectory at Exeter College on 23 March 1887.

== Versions ==
The Adoration proved the most popular of all Morris & Co. tapestries for both church and domestic settings. Ten versions were woven, each with a different border design:

- 1890 for Exeter College, Oxford, still in the chapel there.
- 1890–94, for Wilfred Scawen Blunt
- 1894, for the Corporation of Manchester, now in the Manchester Metropolitan University
- 1895 for the Eton College Chapel, still in situ.
- 1900 for the Museum für Kunst und Gewerbe Hamburg, still in situ.
- 1901 for Sir George Brookman, now in the Art Gallery of South Australia
- 1902 for Sergei Shchukin, in the Hermitage Museum, St Petersburg
- 1904 for Guillaume Mallet of Le Bois des Moutiers, Varengeville-sur-Mer, Haute-Normandie, France, now in the Musée d'Orsay in Paris
- 1906 for the Colman family of Carrow Abbey, Norwich, now in the Castle Museum, Norwich
- 1907 for St Andrew's Church, Roker, in Sunderland, still in situ

The 1904 version, lately in the collection of Yves Saint Laurent and Pierre Bergé, was to be auctioned in February 2009, but at the last minute was withdrawn from the sale by Bergé and donated to the Musée d'Orsay.

== The Star of Bethlehem ==
In 1887, Burne-Jones revisited his tapestry design as a full-scale painting titled The Star of Bethlehem. The colour palette with its rich blue-greens differs greatly from both the original watercolour modello and the Morris tapestry, and its large size allowed him to add a wealth of fine detail not possible in the tapestry version, especially in the clothing. The Star of Bethlehem was completed in 1890 and exhibited at the New Gallery, London, in the spring of 1891 before being sent on to the Birmingham Museum & Art Gallery, where it remains.
