= Herbert Marsh =

British bishop

The Right Reverend Herbert Marsh
- Bishop of Peterborough
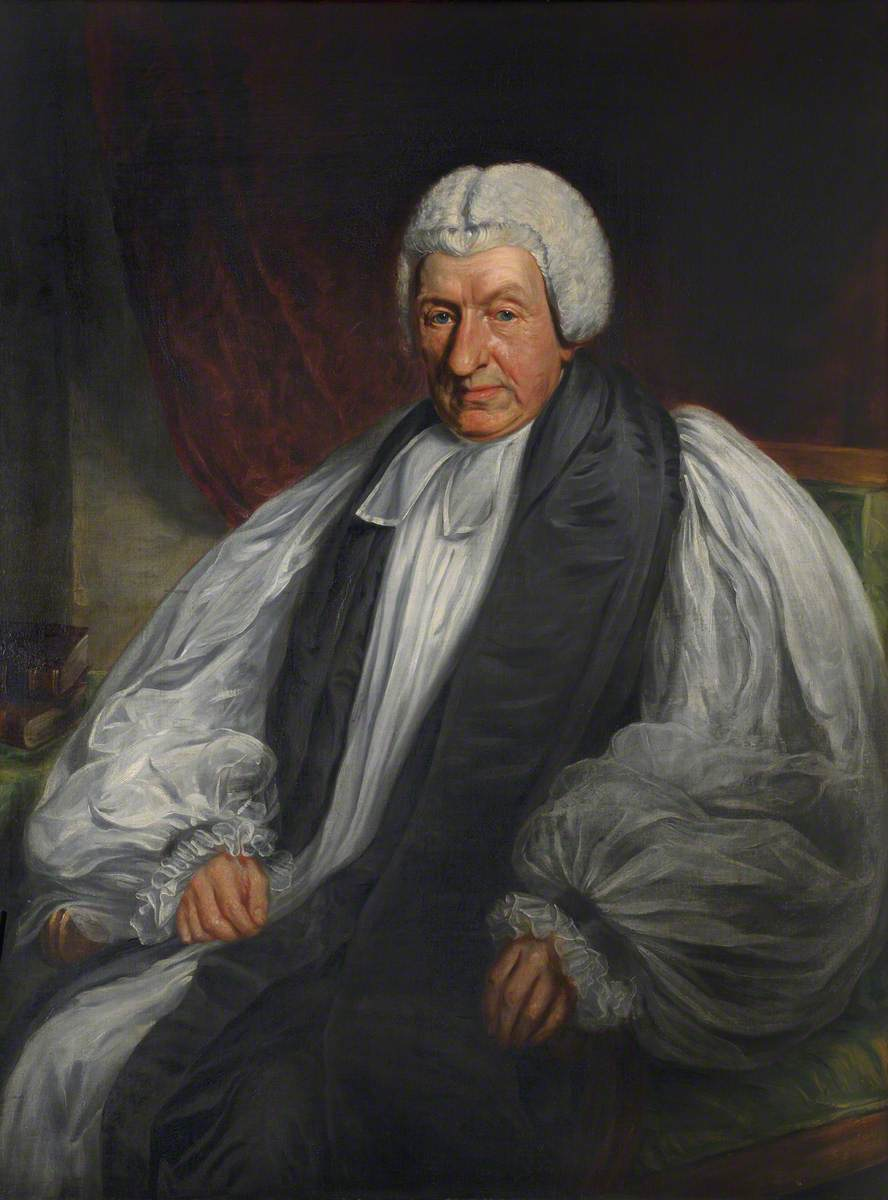
- Diocese: Peterborough
- In office: 1819–1839
- Predecessor: John Parsons
- Successor: George Davys
- Other post: Bishop of Llandaff (1816–1819)

Personal details
- Born: 10 December 1757 Faversham, Kent, England
- Died: 1 May 1839 (aged 81) Peterborough, Northamptonshire, England
- Buried: Peterborough Cathedral
- Denomination: Anglican
- Spouse: Marianne Emilie Charlotte Lecarriere
- Children: Herbert Charles Marsh; George Henry Marsh
- Education: Faversham Grammar School; The King's School, Canterbury
- Alma mater: St John's College, Cambridge

Herbert Marsh (10 December 1757 – 1 May 1839) was a bishop in the Church of England.

== Life ==
The son of Richard Marsh (1709–1779), Vicar of Faversham in Kent, Marsh was born there and educated at Faversham Grammar School, the King's School, Canterbury, and St John's College, Cambridge, where he graduated BA as second wrangler and was elected a fellow of St John's in 1779, the year of the death of his father. He won prizes in 1780 and 1781, proceeded to MA in 1782 and to Bachelor of Divinity in 1792.

While retaining his fellowship at St John's, Marsh studied with J. D. Michaelis at Halle in Prussia and learned the higher criticism. When he returned to England, he translated Michaelis's Introduction to the New Testament and added to it his own hypothesis on the problem of the Synoptic Gospels. Arguing from textual analysis, he advanced a proto-gospel hypothesis, a variant and modification of the contemporary claim by Johann Gottfried Eichhorn. His Dissertation (1801) deduced that there had been an original Aramaean gospel-narrative which had been translated into Greek, and had been circulated in copies into which additional information was afterwards added or interpolated. St Mark (he claimed) had had access to two such copies containing variant additions (some of which had been interpolated into those texts), and drew upon both copies when compiling his own Gospel. These same two copies each then independently received further additions (from a Gnomology or Hebrew document of sayings and precepts of Christ), before one of them was employed by St Matthew, and the other by St Luke, when compiling their Gospels. He drew in the claim that St Matthew's Gospel had originally been written in Hebrew, and that when it was afterwards translated into Greek the translator was able to make use of passages for which he found existing Greek versions in St Mark and St Luke. His hypothesis, now itself superseded, in its time offered a challenge to the conventional or received explanations. It brought him under attack from the conservatives of his church, and into a published debate with John Randolph, then Bishop of Oxford and Regius Professor of Greek in the University of Oxford.

He was Junior Bursar of St John's for the year 1801–1802. In 1805 he began to preach against Calvinism in a series of sermons "in which he denounced the doctrines of justification by faith without works, and of the impossibility of falling from grace, as giving a license to immoral living", which brought him into conflict with the Evangelicals, such as Charles Simeon and Isaac Milner. In 1807 he resigned his fellowship at St John's on being elected as the Lady Margaret's Professor of Divinity at Cambridge and began presenting lectures there on Higher Criticism. He was the first person in the theological school there to give his lectures in English rather than the traditional Latin. In 1808 he was awarded the Oxford degree of Doctor of Divinity, before in 1816 he was appointed the bishop of Llandaff in Glamorgan, where he succeeded Bishop Richard Watson. Watson was more tolerant than Marsh toward seceding Methodist clergy. Marsh was anti-methodist and "made life difficult for any of his clergy with methodist tendencies." In 1819 he was translated to Peterborough.

As a bishop, Marsh was controversial for preaching against the Evangelicals and for refusing to license clergy with Calvinist beliefs (for which he incurred the ire of Sydney Smith). He was a rigorous proponent of strict ecclesiastical conformity.

Marsh's library, consisting of 1346 lots, was sold at auction by Edmund Hodgson on 3 July 1839 (and three following days). A copy of the catalogue is in Cambridge University Library (Munby.c.115[11]).

== Writings ==
- Herbert Marsh, A Dissertation on the Origin and Composition of the Three First Canonical Gospels (F & C Rivington, London; C. Deighton, Cambridge, 1801).
- Herbert Marsh, Letters to the Anonymous Author of Remarks on Michaelis and his Commentator, relating specifically to the Dissertation on the Origin and Composition of our Three First Canonical Gospels (F & C Rivington, London 1802).
- Herbert Marsh, An Illustration of the Hypothesis proposed in the Dissertation on the Origin and Composition of our Three First Canonical Gospels, with a Preface and an Appendix, the whole being a Rejoinder to the anonymous author of the Remarks on Michaelis and his Commentator (F & C Rivington, London; J. Deighton, Cambridge, 1803).

Academic offices
Preceded by John Mainwaring	Lady Margaret's Professor of Divinity at Cambridge; 1807–1839	Succeeded by John James Blunt
Church of England titles
Preceded by Richard Watson	Bishop of Llandaff; 1816–1819	Succeeded by William Van Mildert
Preceded by John Parsons	Bishop of Peterborough; 1819–1839	Succeeded by George Davys
