= William Osmond =

English sculptor and mason

William Osmond (1791–1875) was an English sculptor and mason, based in Salisbury. According to a memorial tablet in the cloisters of Salisbury Cathedral, he was not only a mason but also a lay preacher there.

== Life ==
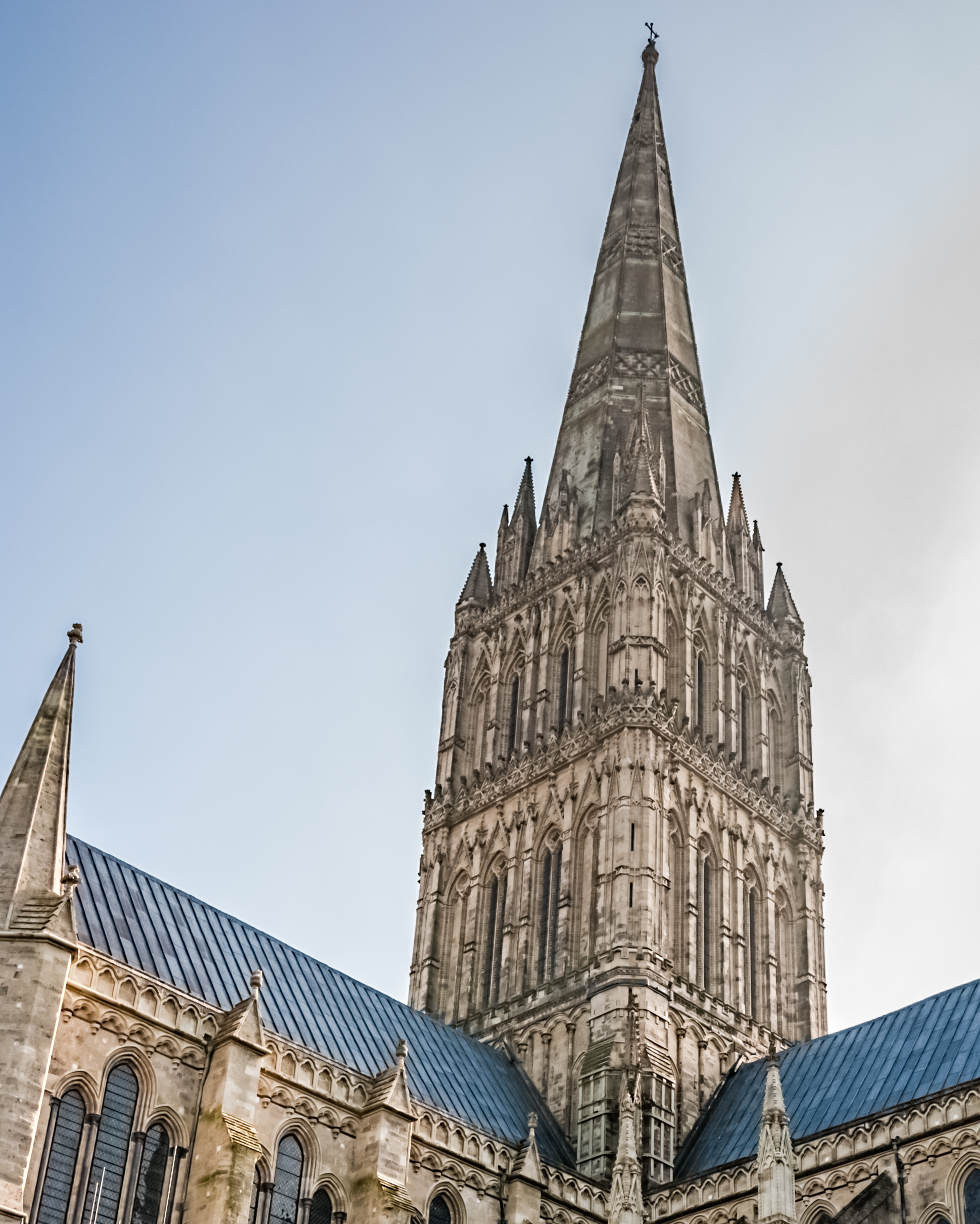
Tower of Salisbury Cathedral

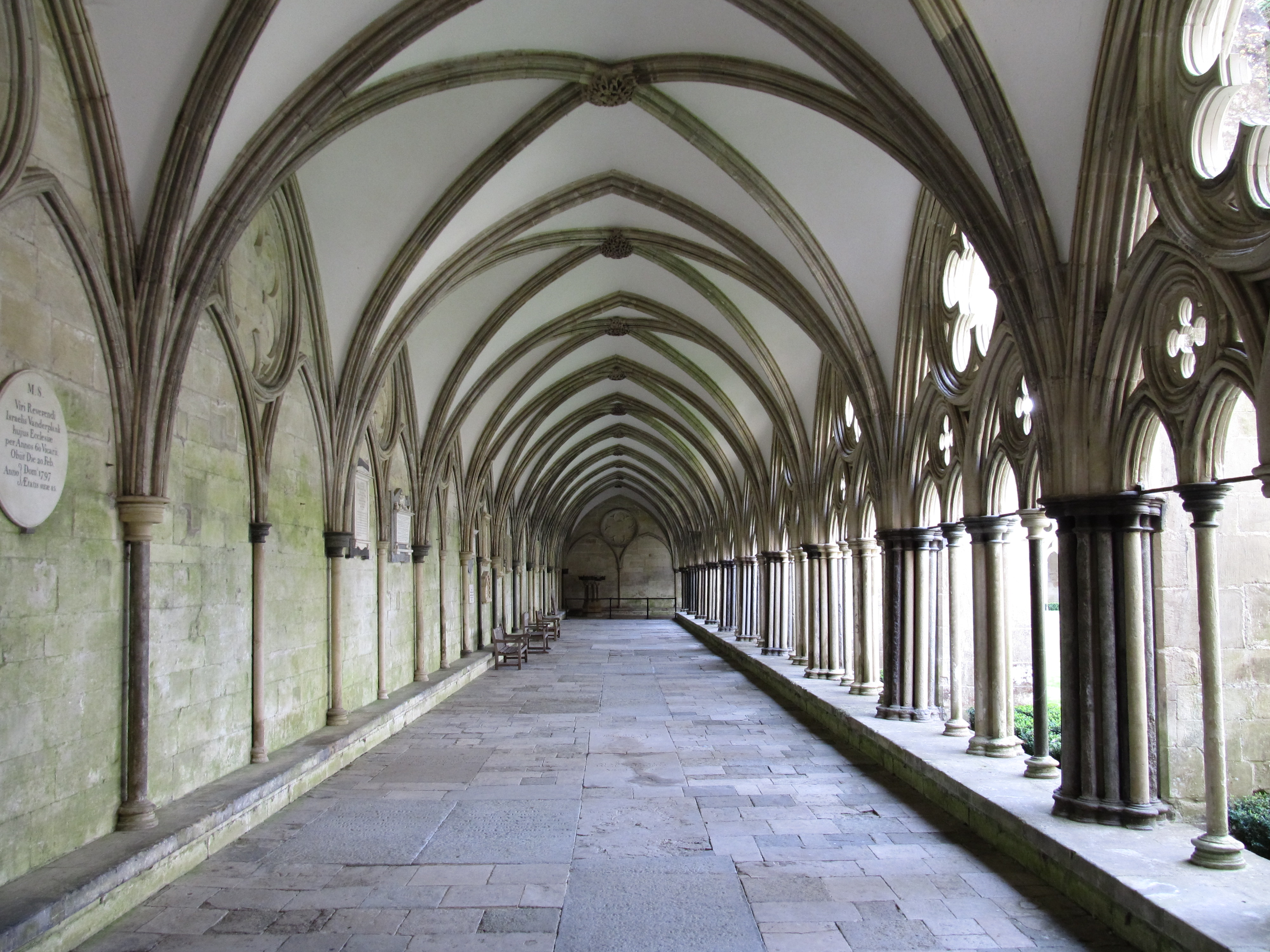
South walk of Salisbury Cathedral cloisters

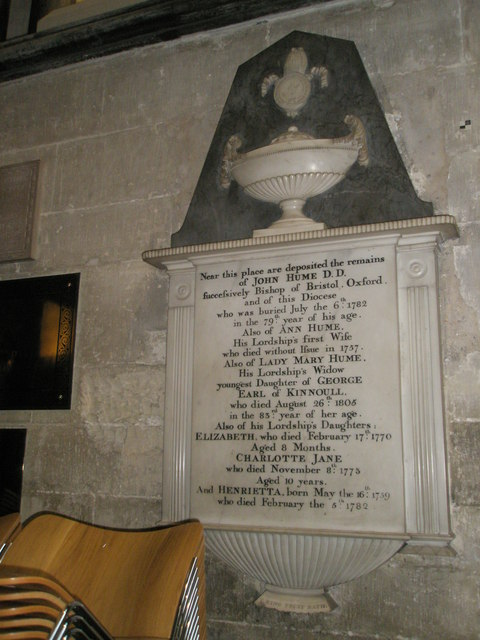
Memorial to Bishop Hume in Salisbury Cathedral

He was born on 17 August 1790, the son of Thomas Osmond (1752–1833) and his wife Elizabeth (Betty) Kellow (1755–1841). He was indentured to William Croome of Fisherton Anger (now a suburb of Salisbury).

He was appointed mason to Salisbury Cathedral in 1818 at the age of 27, employing twelve men and one boy; his first undertaking in the following two years was to make two new pinnacles for the cathedral's tower. In 1843 he made "columns and capitals" for the south walk within the cloisters.

He befriended Augustus Pugin and adopted his Gothic style. In 1826 he moved with his large family to "The Priory" on Brown Street in Salisbury.

He died on 10 July 1875 at home at 113 Exeter Street in Salisbury, a three storey mid-terraced town-house. He is buried in the Cloister Green of Salisbury Cathedral, and there is a memorial in the transept sculpted by his son.

== Other works ==
- Slate sundial for Thruxton Church (1820)
- Monument to the philanthropist Sarah Hayter in Salisbury Cathedral (1822)
- Memorial to the Long family, St Thomas Church in Salisbury (1824)
- Monument to John Lampard at Barford St Martin (1824)
- Monument to Thomas King in Alvediston (1825)
- Monument to John Jacob in Salisbury Cathedral (1828)
- Monument to Bishop John Fisher in Salisbury Cathedral (1828)
- Monument to Anne Kennicott in Windsor Parish Church (1830)
- Monument to Henry Eyre in Winchester Cathedral (1830)
- Monument to Rev James Shuckburgh in Downton, Wiltshire (1833)
- Monument to Rev Daniel Williams at Woolston, Hampshire (1833)
- Monument to Lady Miles at Yateley (1834)
- Monument to William Locke at Seend (1835)
- Monument to Bishop John Hume in Salisbury Cathedral (1835)
- Monument to Wadham Wyndham in Salisbury Cathedral (1835)
- Monument to Rev Robert Hawes in St Edmund Church in Salisbury (1838)
- Monument to Earl Nelson at Standlynch (1839)
- Monument to Henry Hinxman in Salisbury Cathedral (1841)
- Monument to Henrietta Thornycroft at Bodenham (1844)
- Monument to James Cobb in Salisbury Cathedral (1858)

== Family ==
He was married to Charity Marsh (1799–1851). They had seventeen children.

His son William Osmond (1821–1890) was also a sculptor and a mason at the cathedral.
