= Thomas Stinton =

Thomas Stinton, D.D. (26 June 1748, in Ilfracombe – 6 July 1797, in Oxford) was an Oxford college head.

Stinton was educated at Exeter College, Oxford. He was a Fellow there from 1767 to 1785; and Rector from 1785 until his death. An ordained Anglican priest, he was also Vicar of Great Carlton and a Prebendary of St Paul's.
