= John Cole (academic) =

British priest (1758–1819)

John Cole (1758–1819) was an Anglican priest and academic administrator at the University of Oxford.

Cole was originally from Marazion in Cornwall, southwest England. He served as a chaplain in the Royal Navy (HMS Royal Oak) during the American Revolutionary wars and was educated at Exeter College, Oxford, where he gained a Master of Arts (1788), Bachelor of Divinity (1795) and Doctor of Divinity (1800).

In 1808, he was elected Rector of Exeter College, Oxford. While Rector at Exeter College, Cole was also vice-chancellor of Oxford University from 1810 until 1814. At the time of his death in 1819, Cole was pro-vice-chancellor at Oxford University, Chaplain to his Royal Highness the Duke of Clarence, Rector of Yaverland in the Isle of Wight, and Vicar of Gulval in Cornwall.

John Cole was buried in Perranuthnoe, Cornwall on 20 October 1819 - the Cole family had a house in Perranuthnoe parish (which lies alongside Marazion where he was born) and memorials in Perranuthnoe Church.

He had seven sisters and five brothers - Captain Sir Christopher Cole KCB (1770–1836) was a Royal Navy officer, as was Captain Francis Cole (1760-98), who was friends with Edward Pellew, whilst Samuel Cole, DD (1766-1838), became Chaplain to the Royal Hospital at Greenwich and was appointed by the King to be the Examining Chaplain of the Fleet (and also vicar of Sithney in Cornwall). The eldest brother, Major Humphry Cole, served with the 79th Regiment of Foot and died in Jamaica. Their father, Humphry Cole had been an attorney and mayor of Marazion town on four occasions.

A portrait of John Cole by John Opie is held by Exeter College, Oxford.

Academic offices
Preceded by Henry Richards	Rector of Exeter College, Oxford; 1808–1819	Succeeded by John Collier Jones
Preceded by John Parsons	Vice-Chancellor of Oxford University; 1810–1814	Succeeded by Thomas Lee
