= Henry Richards (British Army officer) =

Lieutenant colonel (1812–1864)

Henry Richards (24 July 1812 – 19 September 1864) was a lieutenant colonel in the British Army, justice of the peace, and deputy lieutenant for the county of Pembrokeshire.
