= Henry Richards (priest) =

Henry Richards (March 1747 – 19 December 1807) was a priest and academic administrator at the University of Oxford.

Richards was born in Tawstock, a village in north Devon, southwest England. He was educated at Barnstable School and Exeter College, Oxford from Michaelmas Term 1763, where he gained a BA degree. On 30 June 1763, he was elected as a Fellow at Exeter College. He was awarded a Master of Arts degree on 29 April 1770 and a Bachelor of Divinity on 9 November 1781. Later he was awarded a Doctor of Divinity degree.

On 13 March 1794, Richards became Rector at Bushey, Hertfordshire, within the Diocese of London. On 23 July 1797, he was elected Rector (head) of Exeter College, a post he held until his death on 19 December 1807. While Rector, Richards was also Vice-Chancellor of Oxford University from October 1806 until his death in 1807. In accordance with his Will, he was interred in the chapel at Exeter College and left much of his property to the College.

Academic offices
Preceded by Thomas Stinton	Rector of Exeter College, Oxford; 1797–1807	Succeeded by John Cole
Preceded by Whittington Landon	Vice-Chancellor of Oxford University; 1806–1807	Succeeded by John Parsons
