= John Neal (Welsh footballer) =

Welsh footballer

Personal information
- Full name: John Edward Neal
- Date of birth: 29 November 1899
- Place of birth: Llandudno, Wales
- Date of death: 14 January 1965 (aged 65)
- Place of death: Rhos on Sea, Denbighshire, Wales
- Positions: Centre forward; inside left

Senior career*
Years	Team	Apps	(Gls)
1919–1921	UCNW Bangor		
1921–1924	Llandudno		
1924–1929	Colwyn Bay United		
1929–1930	Wrexham	17	(3)
1930–1931	Colwyn Bay United		

International career
1930	Wales	2	(0)

Managerial career
- Colwyn Bay United
- * Club domestic league appearances and goals

John Edward Neal (29 November 1899 – 14 January 1965) was a Welsh international footballer who played for UCNW Bangor, Llandudno, Colwyn Bay and Wrexham. He was part of the Wales national football team, playing 2 matches. He played his first match on 25 October 1930 against Scotland and his last match on 22 November 1930 against England.

== The Unknowns ==
The Football League refused to allow clubs to release players for internationals if it clashed with a League game. Welsh selectors were forced to pick home based players, including Llandudno-born Neal. The team dubbed 'the Unknowns' and captained by Cardiff City's Fred Keenor gained a 1–1 draw against Scotland at Glasgow's Ibrox Park in October 1930. Neal won his second and final cap in the next match, a 4–0 defeat by England in Wrexham the following month.

== See also ==
- List of Wales international footballers (alphabetical)
