= Norman Crowther Hunt, Baron Crowther-Hunt =

British scholar and Labour politician

The Right Honourable The Lord Crowther-Hunt

Minister of State for the Privy Council Office
- In office 23 January 1976 – 8 April 1976
- Monarch: Elizabeth II
- Prime Minister: Harold Wilson
- Preceded by: Gerry Fowler
- Succeeded by: John Smith

Minister of State for Education and Science
- In office 18 October 1974 – 23 January 1976
- Monarch: Elizabeth II
- Prime Minister: Harold Wilson
- Preceded by: Gerry Fowler
- Succeeded by: Gerry Fowler

Member of the House of Lords Lord Temporal
- In office 9 July 1973 – 16 February 1987; Life Peerage

Personal details
- Born: Norman Crowther Hunt; 13 March 1920 Bradford, England
- Died: 16 February 1987 (aged 66) Oxford, England
- Resting place: Wolvercote, Oxford, England
- Party: Labour
- Occupation: Scholar, politician

Norman Crowther Crowther-Hunt, Baron Crowther-Hunt (né Hunt; 13 March 1920 – 16 February 1987) was a British scholar and Labour politician. He served as a Minister of State in Harold Wilson's 1974–1976 government, and became Rector of Exeter College, Oxford in 1982.

== Early life and education ==
Hunt was born in Bradford in 1920. He was educated at Belle Vue High School in Bradford, and studied history at Sidney Sussex College, Cambridge, before becoming a research fellow there in 1949. He gained a Commonwealth Fund Fellowship studied American politics at Princeton University and in 1952, he was elected to a tutorial fellowship in politics at Exeter College, Oxford.

== Career ==
Hunt appeared regularly on BBC television and radio, and hosted the weekly People and Politics on the BBC World Service. In 1986, his work with the corporation lead to his appointment as chairman of its General Advisory Council.

Through his friendship with Harold Wilson, Hunt was able to promote reform of the civil service and devolution, two issues on which he felt deeply. During Wilson's first term as Prime Minister, he served on the Committee on the Civil Service (1966–1968; chaired by Lord Fulton), and was appointed to the Royal Commission on the Constitution, chaired by Lord Crowther and later Lord Kilbrandon, in 1969.

On 9 July 1973, he was awarded a life peerage as Baron Crowther-Hunt, of Eccleshill in the West Riding of the County of York.

To develop the government's devolution proposals following Wilson's return to power, Crowther-Hunt became a constitutional adviser to the government from March to October 1974. He then served as Minister of State, Education and Science until 1976, when he became Minister of State for the Privy Council Office, when he again dealt with devolution issues.

Disillusioned by the government's narrow, party-political attitude to devolution and obstructions to civil service reform, he returned to full-time teaching at Exeter College in 1976. He became Rector in 1982, a position in which he served until his death from a heart attack in 1987.

== Footnotes ==
Academic offices
Preceded by Greig Barr	Rector of Exeter College, Oxford; 1982–1987	Succeeded by Richard Oswald Chandler Norman
