= John Prideaux Lightfoot =

English clergyman

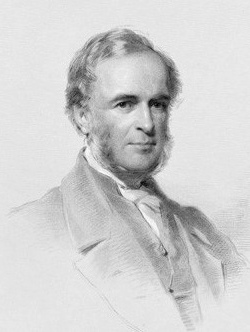
John Prideaux Lightfoot

John Prideaux Lightfoot (23 March 1803 – 23 March 1887) was an English Anglican priest who served as the rector of Exeter College, Oxford, from 18 March 1854 until his death and as vice-chancellor of Oxford University from 1862 to 1866. He was the president of the Oxford Architectural Society (later the Oxfordshire Architectural and Historical Society) from November 1854 to November 1855.

John Prideaux Lightfoot was born on 23 March 1803 at Crediton, Devon, England. He was the eldest son of Nicholas Lightfoot (1772–1847) and his wife Bridget Prideaux. Lightfoot married Elizabeth Ann Le Blanc on 15 July 1835 at St Luke's Church, Chelsea; they had eight children. His first wife died 21 November 1860 at Oxford, aged 50. He was married a second time on 7 January 1863 to Louisa, only daughter of Sir George Best Robinson, 2nd Baronet, widow of Capt. C. R. G. Douglas, B.N.I. They had one daughter.

Lightfoot succeeded Joseph Loscombe Richards as rector of Exeter, or head of the college, while Sir George Gilbert Scott's proposal for a new chapel inspired by the Sainte Chapelle in Paris was under consideration. The building programme during Lightfoot's tenure also included the Gothic revival library of 1856 and new rector's lodgings in the Georgian style (1857). In 1886, Lightfoot commissioned the Adoration of the Magi tapestry from Edward Burne-Jones and William Morris, both alumni of Exeter, to be hung in the chapel. The completed tapestry was presented to the college in 1890, three years after Prideaux's death at the rectory at Exeter on 23 March 1887.

Academic offices
Preceded by Joseph Loscombe Richards	Rector of Exeter College, Oxford; 1854–1887	Succeeded by William Walrond Jackson
Preceded by Francis Jeune	Vice-Chancellor of Oxford University; 1862–1866	Succeeded by Frances Knyvett Leighton
