= Colleges of the University of Oxford =

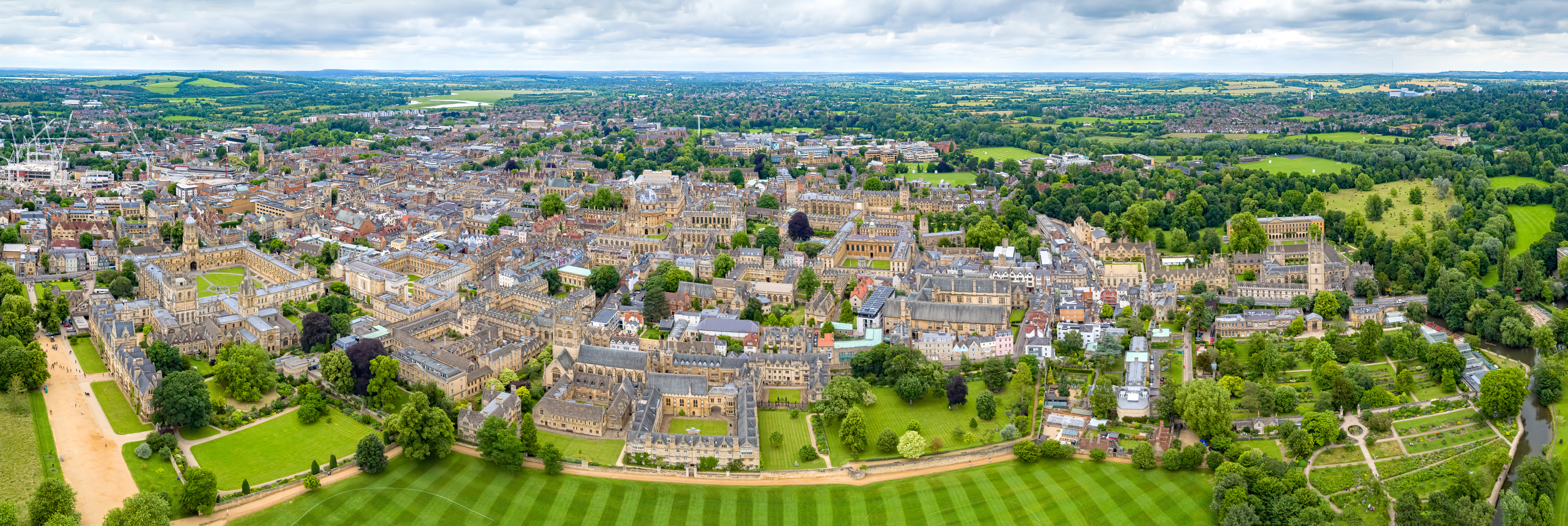
Aerial view (looking north) of many of the colleges of the University of Oxford

The University of Oxford has 43 colleges including three societies and four permanent private halls (PPHs) of religious foundation. The colleges and PPHs are autonomous self-governing corporations within the university.

These colleges not only are houses of residence, but also have substantial responsibility for teaching undergraduate students. Generally tutorials (one of the main methods of teaching in Oxford) and classes are the responsibility of colleges, while lectures, examinations, laboratories, and the central library are run by the university. Students normally have most of their tutorials in their own college, but often have a couple of modules taught at other colleges or even at faculties and departments. Most colleges take both graduates and undergraduates, but several are for graduates only.

Undergraduate and graduate students may name preferred colleges in their applications. For undergraduate students, an increasing number of departments practise reallocation to ensure that the ratios between potential students and subject places available at each college are as uniform as possible. For the Department of Physics, reallocation is done on a random basis after a shortlist of candidates is drawn upon and before candidates are invited for interviews at the university.

For graduate students, many colleges express a preference for candidates who plan to undertake research in an area of interest of one of its fellows. St Hugh's College, for example, states that it accepts graduate students in most subjects, principally those in the fields of interest of the fellows of the college.

A typical college consists of a hall for dining, a chapel, a library, a college bar, senior, middle (postgraduate), and junior common rooms, rooms for 200–400 undergraduates, and lodgings for the head of the college and other dons. College buildings range from medieval to modern, but most are made up of interlinked quadrangles or courtyards, with a porter's lodge controlling entry from the outside.

The first modern merger of colleges was in 2008, with Green College and Templeton College merging to form Green Templeton College. The number of PPHs also reduced when Greyfriars closed in 2008 and when St Benet's Hall closed in 2022. Reuben College, established in 2019, is the first new Oxbridge college since 1990, when Kellogg College was established. There is also a long-term plan to establish another new postgraduate college in conjunction with the redevelopment of Warneford Hospital in east Oxford, with a planning application lodged in August 2025.

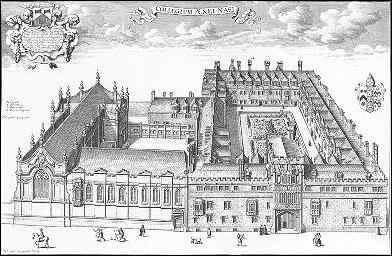
Brasenose College in the 1670s

== History ==

The collegiate system arose because Oxford University came into existence through the gradual agglomeration of numerous independent institutions. Over the centuries several different types of college have emerged and disappeared.

=== Monastic halls ===
The first academic houses were monastic halls. Of the dozens established during the 12th–15th centuries, none survived the Reformation. The modern Dominican permanent private hall of Blackfriars (1921) is a descendant of the original (1221), and is sometimes described as heir to the oldest tradition of teaching in Oxford.

=== Academic halls ===
As the university took shape, friction between the hundreds of students living where and how they pleased led to a decree that all undergraduates would have to reside in approved halls.

What eventually put an end to the medieval halls was the emergence of colleges. Often generously endowed and with permanent teaching staff, the colleges were originally the preserve of graduate students. However, once they began accepting fee-paying undergraduates in the 14th century, the halls' days were numbered. Of the hundreds of Aularian houses (from the Latin for "hall") that sprang up, only St Edmund Hall (c. 1225) remains.

=== Colleges ===
The oldest colleges are University College, Balliol, and Merton, established between 1249 and 1264, although there is some dispute over the exact order and precisely when each began taking students. The fourth oldest college is Exeter, founded in 1314, and the fifth is Oriel, founded in 1326.

=== Women's colleges ===
Women entered the university in 1879, with the opening of Lady Margaret Hall and Somerville College, becoming members of the University (and thus eligible to receive degrees) in 1920. Other women's colleges before integration were St Anne's, St Hilda's and St Hugh's. In 1974 the first men's colleges to admit women were Brasenose, Hertford, Jesus, St Catherine's and Wadham. By 2008 all colleges had become mixed, although one of the Permanent Private Halls, St Benet's Hall, did not start to admit postgraduate women until Michaelmas term 2014 and women undergraduates until Michaelmas 2016.

=== Postgraduate and mature colleges ===
Some colleges, such as Green Templeton, Kellogg, Linacre, Nuffield, Reuben, St Antony's, St Cross and Wolfson, admit only postgraduate students. All Souls admits only fellows. Harris Manchester admits only "mature students" with a minimum age of 21.

=== Societies ===
Kellogg, Reuben and St Cross are the only Oxford colleges without a royal charter. They are officially societies of the university rather than independent colleges and are considered departments of the university for accounting purposes.

=== Private halls ===
The Oxford University Act 1854 and the university statute De aulis privatis (On private Halls) of 1855, allowed any Master of Arts aged at least 28 years to open a private hall after obtaining a licence to do so. One such was Charsley's Hall.

=== Permanent private halls ===
The Universities Tests Act 1871 opened all university degrees and positions to men who were not members of the Church of England (subject to safeguards for religious instruction and worship), which made it possible for Catholics and Non-conformists to open private halls.

The first Catholic private halls were Clarke's Hall (now Campion Hall), opened by the Jesuit Order in 1896 and Hunter Blair's Hall (later St Benet's Hall) opened by the Benedictine Order in 1899. In 1918, the university passed a statute to allow private halls which were not run for profit to become permanent private halls, and the two halls took their current names.

== Map ==
Map of the University of Oxford

University of Oxford faculties & facilities (Central Oxford) University of Oxford
Key
College (illustrative)	Permanent private hall

== List of colleges ==
College (with arms and scarf colours)	Latin name	Year of foundation	Sister college at Cambridge	Head of House	Total assets	Financial endowment	Undergraduates	Postgraduates	Visiting students	Male students %	Female students %	Total students	Assets per student	Notes
All Souls College	Collegium Omnium Animarum, Collegium Omnium Animarum Fidelium Defunctorum de Oxonia	1438	Trinity Hall	Sir John Vickers	£546,604,000	£501,226,000	0	9	0	56	44	9	£51,711,000	Fellow-only.
Balliol CollegeScarf colours: navy, with two equally spaced triple-stripes of white, purple and white again	Collegium Balliolensis, Collegium de Balliolo	1263	St John's College	Seamus Perry	£147,546,000	£123,435,000	385	343	1	60	40	729	£202,000	
Brasenose CollegeScarf colours: black, with two narrow yellow stripes a fifth of a scarf-width in from either edge	Aula regia et collegium aenei nasi, Collegium Aenei Nasi	1509	Gonville and Caius College	John Bowers Alyson King (principal-elect)	£179,827,000	£151,293,000	360	234	3	52	48	597	£301,000	
Christ Church (Note: The net assets, endowment figures and student figures for St John's College, Pembroke College, Christ Church, Magdalen College and the university total have been updated based on the latest financial statements (year ended 31 July 2025) and student figures.)Scarf colours: navy, with two sets of narrow triple stripes a quarter scarf-width in from either edge, each set of triple stripes of red, white and brown from left to right	Aedes Christi, Ecclesia Christi Cathedralis Oxon: ex fundatione Regis Henrici Octavi	1546	Trinity College	Sarah Foot	£830,291,000	£816,253,000	455	225	0	49	51	680	£1,221,000	
Corpus Christi CollegeScarf colours: five equal stripes alternating navy and dark red, with navy at the edges and in the centre	Collegium Corporis Christi	1517	Corpus Christi College	Helen Moore	£191,539,000	£166,841,000	258	98	2	59	41	358	£535,000	
Exeter CollegeScarf colours: black, with two purple stripes each a quarter of the scarf wide, separated from one another by a central black area itself a quarter of the scarf wide	Collegium Exoniense	1314	Emmanuel College	Dr Andrew Roe	£130,995,000	£74,876,000	343	233	26	50	50	602	£218,000	
Green Templeton CollegeScarf colours: navy, with a wide central stripe of green, and a narrow yellow stripe through each of the navy areas to either side	Collegium Green Templeton	2008	St Edmund's College	Sir Michael Dixon	£102,808,000	£1,143,000	90	439	0	57	43	529	£194,000	Post graduate-only.
Harris Manchester CollegeScarf colours: navy, with a wide central stripe of red, and a narrow yellow stripe through each of the navy areas to either side	Collegium de Harris et Manchester	1786; College: 1996	Homerton College	Beth Breeze	£40,301,000	£14,371,000	115	150	0	49	51	265	£152,000	Mature-only.
Hertford CollegeScarf colours: burgundy, with two narrow stripes of red lined with white a quarter scarf in from either edge	Collegium Hertfordense, Collegium Hertfordiense	1282; College: 1740	None	Patrick Roche (interim) Alexandra Freeman (principal-elect)	£79,183,000	£60,552,000	410	236	31	49	51	677	£117,000	
Jesus CollegeScarf colours: green, with a central narrow white stripe, and two slightly thinner white stripes one fifth of a scarf-width in from either edge.	Collegium Ihesus, Collegium Jesu	1571	Jesus College	Lindsay Skoll	£308,251,000	£259,938,000	358	189	1	53	47	548	£562,501	
Keble CollegeScarf colours: navy, with two red stripes a fifth of a scarf-width in from either edge, each stripe divided by a white pinstripe	Collegium de Keble, Collegium Keblense	1870	Selwyn College	Sir Michael Jacobs	£128,578,000	£50,313,000	422	369	4	60	40	795	£162,000	
Kellogg CollegeScarf colours: navy, with two equally-spaced stripes of medium-blue edged with white	Collegium de Kellogg	1990; Renamed: 1994	None	Jonathan Michie	—N/a (Note: The financial statements of Kellogg College, Reuben College and St Cross College, due to their not having Royal Charters, are incorporated into the university's own accounts.)	—N/a	0	1155	0	62	38	1155	N/A	Post graduate-only. No royal charter.
Lady Margaret HallScarf colours: navy, with two equally-spaced stripes of yellow, each edged with a thinner stripe of white on the left-hand side only	Aula Dominae Margaretae	1878	Newnham College	Christine Gerrard	£64,477,000	£36,279,000	405	212	24	47	53	641	£101,000	
Linacre CollegeScarf colours: two equally-spaced thin yellow stripes separating the outer two-thirds of black and the central third of grey	Collegium de Linacre	1962	Hughes Hall	Nick Brown	£43,288,000	£27,854,000	0	587	0	52	48	587	£74,000	
Lincoln CollegeScarf colours: dark blue, with two pairs of sky-blue tramline stripes one quarter of a scarf-width in from either edge	Collegio Lincolnensi, Collegium Lincolniense	1427	Downing College	Nigel Clifford	£161,414,000	£124,437,000	312	302	3	51	49	617	£262,000	
Magdalen CollegeScarf colours: black, with two equally-spaced wide bands of white	Collegium Beatae Mariae Magdalenae	1458	Magdalene College	Dinah Rose	£985,756,000	£817,931,000	405	205	10	45	55	620	£1,590,000	
Mansfield CollegeScarf colours: navy, with two equally-spaced pairs of thin tramline stripes, the left pinstripes in each pair of yellow and the right of red	Collegium de Mansfield	1886; College: 1995	Homerton College	Helen Mountfield	£30,307,000	£14,627,000	239	173	40	55	45	452	£67,000	
Merton CollegeScarf colours: purple, with two narrow white stripes a quarter of a scarf-width in from either edge	Collegium de Merton, Domus sive collegium scholarium de Merton in universitate Oxon	1264	Peterhouse	Jennifer Payne	£419,586,000	£387,676,000	314	188	0	52	48	502	£836,000	
New CollegeScarf colours: brown, with two equally-spaced narrow white stripes	Collegium Beatae Mariae Wynton in Oxon, Collegium Novum	1379	King's College	Miles Young	£363,303,000	£303,324,000	418	295	10	55	45	723	£502,000	
Nuffield CollegeScarf colours: black, with two equally-spaced stripes of dark-red edged with yellow	Collegium de Nuffield, Collegium Nuffield	1937	None	Dame Julia Black	£263,017,000	£239,159,000	0	95	0	54	46	95	£2,769,000	Post graduate-only.
Oriel CollegeScarf colours: dark blue, with two equally-spaced pairs of narrow white tramlines	Collegium Orielense	1326	Clare College	The Lord Mendoza	£105,618,000	£86,524,000	323	200	5	54	46	528	£200,000	
Pembroke CollegeScarf colours: navy, with two equally-spaced stripes of grey edged with pearl-pink	Collegium Pembrochiae, Collegium Pembrochianum	1624	Queens' College	Sir Ernest Ryder	£176,001,000	£85,547,000	390	250	30	51	49	670	£263,000	
The Queen's CollegeScarf colours: navy, with a wide band of white through the centre, and a white pinstripe through each of the two remaining navy areas	Collegium Reginae	1341	Pembroke College	Paul Johnson	£426,250,000	£327,789,000	336	177	1	51	49	514	£829,000	
Reuben College	Collegium de Reuben	2019; Renamed: 2020	None	Lord Tarassenko	—N/a	—N/a	0	330	0			330	N/A	Post graduate-only. No royal charter.
St Anne's CollegeScarf colours: navy, with two equally-spaced stripes of red edged with grey	Collegium Sanctae Annae	1879; College: 1952	Murray Edwards College	Helen King	£66,634,000	£40,574,000	439	352	37	50	50	828	£80,000	
St Antony's CollegeScarf colours: navy, with two equally-spaced wide bands of yellow, and a thin red stripe through each yellow band	Collegium Sancti Antonii	1950; College: 1963	Wolfson College	Roger Goodman	£72,393,000	£44,741,000	0	443	0	49	51	443	£163,000	Post graduate-only.
St Catherine's CollegeScarf colours: maroon, with two equally-spaced narrow stripes of purple edged with sky-blue	Collegium Sanctae Catherinae	1868; College: 1962	Robinson College	Jude Kelly	£142,129,000	£104,305,000	505	428	50	55	45	983	£125,000	
St Cross CollegeScarf colours: navy, with two narrow double-stripes a quarter of a scarf-width in from either edge, the left of each double-stripe of white and the right of purple	Collegium Sanctae Crucis	1965	Clare Hall	Kate Mavor	—N/a	—N/a	0	545	0	55	45	545	N/A	Post graduate-only. No royal charter.
St Edmund HallScarf colours: maroon, with two equally-spaced mustard pinstripes	Aula Sancti Edmundi	1278; College: 1957	Fitzwilliam College	Katherine Willis, Baroness Willis of Summertown	£87,027,000	£68,248,000	396	296	40	57	43	732	£119,000	
St Hilda's CollegeScarf colours: navy, with three equally-spaced stripes of white	Collegium Sanctae Hildae	1893	None	Sarah Springman	£119,647,000	£56,592,000	399	183	0	49	51	582	£206,000	
St Hugh's CollegeScarf colours: Two narrow double-stripes a fifth of a scarf-width in from either edge, the left of each double-stripe of white and the right of yellow, with the background areas to the left of each double-stripe of blue, and to the right of black, such that a black and a blue area meet in the centre of the scarf.	Collegium Sancti Hugonis	1886	Clare College	Michele Acton	£69,374,000	£34,934,000	425	366	1	56	44	792	£88,000	
St John's CollegeScarf colours: black, with three equally-spaced thin stripes, the central stripe of red and the outer stripes of yellow	Collegium Divi Joannis Baptistae, Collegium Sancti Johannis Baptistae	1555	Sidney Sussex College	Sue Black, Baroness Black of Strome	£891,197,000	£779,833,000	425	250	5	51	49	680	£1,311,000	
St Peter's CollegeScarf colours: green, with two narrow yellow stripes a quarter of a scarf-width in from either edge	Collegium Sancti Petri, Collegium Sancti Petri Juxta Ballium	1929; College: 1961	None	Judith Buchanan	£78,172,000	£47,030,000	356	215	21	54	46	592	£132,000	
Somerville CollegeScarf colours: red, with two equally-spaced narrow black stripes	Collegium de Somerville	1879	Girton College	Catherine Royle	£223,804,000	£83,663,000	425	209	0	50	50	634	£353,000	
Trinity CollegeScarf colours: navy, with two narrow white stripes a quarter of a scarf-width in from either edge	Collegium Sacrosanctae Trinitatis, Collegium Sanctae et Individuae Trinitatis in Universitate Oxon. ex Fundatione Thomae Pope Militis	1555	Churchill College	Sir Robert Chote	£193,684,000	£164,267,000	299	135	0	54	46	434	£446,000	
University CollegeScarf colours: navy, with two narrow yellow stripes a quarter of a scarf-width in from either edge	Collegium Magnae Aulae Universitatis	1249	Trinity Hall	Valerie Amos, Baroness Amos	£209,052,000	£125,489,000	394	224	0	59	41	618	£338,000	
Wadham CollegeScarf colours: black, with two grey-blue stripes a quarter of a scarf-width in from either edge, each stripe edged with a yellow pinstripe on the right-hand side only	Collegiun de Wadham, Collegium Wadhami	1610	Christ's College	Robert Hannigan	£142,812,000	£105,237,000	466	208	30	51	49	704	£203,000	
Wolfson CollegeScarf colours: navy, with two equally-spaced stripes of red edged with yellow	Collegium de Wolfson	1966; College: 1981	Darwin College	Sir Tim Hitchens	£95,187,000	£60,395,000	0	581	0	52	48	581	£141,000	Post graduate-only.
Worcester CollegeScarf colours: black, with two equally-spaced pearl-pink stripes	Collegium Vigorniense	1714	St Catharine's College	David Isaac, CBE	£87,218,000	£48,324,000	438	179	30	50	50	647	£135,000	
Total					£9,219,135,000	£7,125,220,000	12,375	13,650	570	49	51	26,595	£347,000	

== List of permanent private halls ==
U=Undergraduates • P=Postgraduates • V=Visiting students • M=Male students • F=Female students • T=Total students
Name	Latin name	Foundation	Sister hall at Cambridge	Religious affiliation	Total assets	Financial endowment	U	P	V	M%	F%	T	Assets per student
Blackfriars Hall	Domus Fratrum Praedicatorum	1221; Refounded: 1921; PPH 1994	None	Catholic (Dominican)	—N/a (Note: Blackfriars Hall is operated by the English Province of the Order of Preachers, part of the Dominican Order, who also run several priories and other charitable operations. The hall does not have assets or endowments specific to it that are shown in the order's accounts.)	—N/a	3	21	11	57	43	44	—N/a
Campion Hall	Aula Privata de Campion	1896	None	Catholic (Jesuit)	—N/a (Note: Campion Hall is one of several institutions operated by the Society Of Jesus Trust Of 1929 For Roman Catholic Purposes. The hall does not have assets or endowments specific to it that are shown in the society's accounts.)	—N/a	0	12	0	100	0	12	—N/a
Regent's Park College	Collegium de Principis Regentis Paradiso, Collegium de Principis Cum Regentis Paradiso	1752; Move to Oxford: 1927; PPH: 1957	Lucy Cavendish College	Baptist	£29,024,000	£7,820,000	155	118	17	48	52	290	£100,083
Wycliffe Hall	Aula de Wycliffe, Aula Wiclefi	1877	Ridley Hall	Anglican	£9,364,000	£560,000	65	40	53	51	49	158	£59,000
Total					£25,860,000	£4,080,000	270	247	78	53	47	517	£50,000

== Arms and colours ==
Each college and permanent private hall has its own arms, although in some cases these were assumed rather than granted by the College of Arms. Under King Henry VIII Oxford colleges were granted exemption from having their arms granted by the College of Arms; and some, like Lady Margaret Hall, have chosen to take advantage of this exemption, whilst others, such as Oriel, despite having used the arms for many centuries, have recently elected to have the arms granted officially.

The blazons below are taken from the Oxford University Calendar unless otherwise indicated. Shields are emblazoned as commonly drawn, and notable inconsistencies between blazons and emblazons (the shields as drawn) are indicated.

Each college also has its own colours used on items such as scarves and rowing blades.

College	Arms	Blazon	Scarf	Blades
All Souls College		Or, a chevron between three cinquefoils gules.		
Balliol College		Azure a lion rampant argent, crowned or, impaling gules, an orle argent.		
Brasenose College		Tierced in pale: (1) Argent, a chevron sable between three roses gules seeded or, barbed vert (for Smyth); (2) or, an escutcheon of the arms of the See of Lincoln (gules, two lions of England in pale or, on a chief azure Our Lady crowned seated on a tombstone issuant from the chief, in her dexter arm the Infant Jesus, in her sinister arm a sceptre, all or), ensigned with a mitre proper; (3) quarterly, first and fourth argent, a chevron between three bugle-horns stringed sable; second and third argent, a chevron between three crosses crosslet sable (for Sutton). (Note: Brasenose: the blazon of the arms of the See of Lincoln given here differs from that at Lincoln College; the two forms are simply interpretations of the simpler blazon gules, two lions passant gardant or, in a chief azure Our Lady sitting with her Babe, crown and sceptre of the second.)		
Christ Church		Sable, on a cross engrailed argent, a lion passant gules between four leopards' faces azure, on a chief or a rose of the third, seeded or, barbed vert, between two Cornish choughs proper.		
Corpus Christi College		Tierced per pale: (1) Azure, a pelican with wings endorsed vulning herself or; (2) Argent, thereon an escutcheon charged with the arms of the See of Winchester (i.e. gules, two keys addorsed in bend, the uppermost or, the other argent, a sword interposed between them in bend sinister of the third, pommel and hilt gold; the escutcheon ensigned with a mitre of the last); (3) Sable, a chevron or between three owls argent, on a chief of the second as many roses gules, seeded of the second, barbed vert.		
Exeter College		Argent, two bends nebuly within a bordure sable charged with eight pairs of keys, addorsed and interlaced in the rings, the wards upwards, or.		
Green Templeton College		Or between two flaunches vert on each a nautilus shell the aperture outwards or a rod of Aesculapius sable the serpent azure.		
Harris Manchester College		Gules, two Torches inflamed in saltire proper; on a Chief Argent, between Two Roses of a field barbed and seeded an open Book also proper.		
Hertford College		Gules, a stag's head caboshed argent, attired, and between the attires a cross patty fitchy at the foot, or.		
Jesus College		Vert, three stags trippant argent attired or.		
Keble College		Argent, a chevron engrailed gules, on a chief azure three mullets pierced or.		
Kellogg College		Per pale indented argent and azure on the argent a chevron enhanced gules in base a book azure leaved argent on the azure an ear of wheat palewise or the whole within a bordure gules.		Christ Church Boat Club
Lady Margaret Hall		Or, on a chevron between in chief two talbots passant and in base a bell all azure, a portcullis of the field.		
Linacre College		Sable an open Book proper edged or bound gules the dexter page charged with the Greek letter alpha the sinister page charged with the Greek letter omega both sable the whole between three escallops argent.		
Lincoln College		Tierced per pale: (1) Barry of six argent and azure, in chief three lozenges gules, on the second bar of an argent a mullet pierced sable; (2) Argent, thereon an escutcheon of the arms of the See of Lincoln (i.e., Gules, two lions passant guardant or, on a chief azure the Blessed Virgin Mary ducally crowned seated on a throne issuant from the chief, on her dexter arm the infant Jesus and holding in her sinister hand a sceptre, all gold; the escutcheon ensigned with a mitre azure garnished and stringed or); (3) Vert, three stags trippant argent attired or. (Note: Lincoln: although the three stags are blazoned as trippant argent attired or they are universally drawn as statant or. See also note on Brasenose above.)		
Magdalen College		Lozengy ermine and sable, on a chief of the second three lilies argent slipped and seeded or.		
Mansfield College		Gules an open book proper inscribed DEUS LOCUTUS EST NOBIS IN FILIO in letters sable bound argent edged and clasped or between three cross crosslets or.		
Merton College		Or, three chevronels party per pale, the first and third azure and gules, the second gules and azure.		
New College		Argent, two chevronels sable between three roses gules, seeded or, barbed vert.		
Nuffield College		Ermine on a fesse or between in chief two roses gules barbed and seeded proper and in base a balance of the second three pears sable, and for crest on a wreath or and gules a demi bull gules armed and unguled or resting the sinister hoof on a winged wheel or. (Note: Nuffield: uniquely among the Oxford colleges the blazon of Nuffield recorded in the University Calendar also describes its crest.)		
Oriel College		Gules, three lions passant guardant in pale or within a bordure engrailed argent.		
Pembroke College		Per pale azure and gules, three lions rampant, two and one, argent, on a chief per pale argent and or, in the first a rose gules, seeded or, barbed vert in the second a thistle of Scotland proper.		
The Queen's College		Argent, three eagles displayed two and one gules, legged and beaked or, on the breast of the first eagle, a pierced mullet of the third as cadency mark. (Note: Queens: the depiction of the pierced mullet is quite variable; a mullet of six points is common and the piercing is sometimes indicated schematically.)		
Somerville College		Argent, three mullets in chevron reversed gules, between six crosses crosslet fitched sable.		
St Anne's College		Gules, on a chevron between in chief two lions' heads erased argent, and in base a sword of the second pummelled and kilt or and enfiled with a wreath of laurel proper, three ravens.		
St Antony's College		Or on a chevron between three tau crosses gules as many pierced mullets of the field.		
St Catherine's College		Sable a saltire ermine between four Catherine wheels or.		
St Cross College		Argent a cross potent purpure a quarter counterchanged.		
St Edmund Hall		Or, a cross patonce gules cantoned by four Cornish choughs proper.		
St Hilda's College		Azure on a fess or between in chief two unicorns' heads couped and in base a coiled serpent argent three estoiles gules.		
St Hugh's College		Azure a saltire ermine between four fleurs-de-lis or.		
St John's College		Gules, on a bordure sable eight estoiles or; on a canton ermine a lion rampant of the second; on the fess point an annulet of the third.		
St Peter's College		Per pale vert and argent, to the dexter two keys in saltire or surmounted by a triple towered castle argent masoned sable (representing Oxford bailey) and on the sinister a cross gules surmounted by a mitre or between four martlets sable (for Chavasse), the whole within a bordure or.		
Trinity College		Party per pale or and azure, on a chevron between three griffins heads erased four fleurs-de-lys, all counter-changed of the field.		
University College		Azure, a cross patonce between five martlets or.		
Wadham College		Gules, a chevron between 3 roses argent, seeded or, barbed vert, impaling gules, a bend or between two escallops argent.		
Wolfson College		Per pale gules and or on a chevron between three roses two pears all countercharged the roses barbed and seeded proper.		
Worcester College		Argent, two chevronels between six martlets, three, two and one gules. (Note: Worcester: although the six martlets are blazoned as gules (red) they are usually (but not always) drawn as sable (black).)		
Blackfriars		Gyronny of sable and argent, a cross flory counterchanged. (Note: Blackfriars: the blazon used here is that of the Dominican Order. Blackfriars also uses their simpler shield, blazoned as sable, a pile inverted argent.)		
Campion Hall		Argent on a cross sable a plate charged with a wolf's head erased of the second between in pale two billets of the field that in chief charged with a cinquefoil and that in base with a saltire gules and in fesse as many plates each charged with a campion flower leaved and slipped proper on a chief also of the second two branches of palm in saltire enfiled with a celestial crown or. (Note: Campion: the phrase billets of the Weld used in the Calendar appears to be a misprint for billets of the field.)		
Regent's Park College		Argent on a cross gules an open Bible proper irradiated or the pages inscribed with the words DOMINUS JESUS in letters sable on a chief wavy azure fish or.		
Wycliffe Hall		Gules, an open book proper the pages inscribed with the words VIA VERITAS VITA in letters sable on a chief azure three crosses crosslet argent and in base an estoile or. (Note: Wycliffe: the blazon used here is simply a description of the shield as usually drawn.)		

== Heads of houses ==
The senior member of each college is an officer known generically as the head of house. Their specific title varies from college to college as indicated in the list below. While the head of house will usually be an academic, it is not uncommon for a person to be appointed who has had a distinguished career outside academic circles.

For a list of current heads of houses, see list of heads of houses of the University of Oxford.

- Principal: Brasenose, Green Templeton, Harris Manchester, Hertford, Jesus College, Lady Margaret Hall, Linacre, Mansfield, St Anne's, St Edmund Hall, St Hilda's, St Hugh's, Somerville, Regent's Park, and Wycliffe Hall
- Master: Balliol, Pembroke, St Catherine's, St Cross, St Peter's, University College, and Campion Hall
- Warden: All Souls, Keble, Merton, New College, Nuffield, St Antony's, and Wadham
- President: Corpus Christi, Kellogg, Magdalen, Reuben, St John's, Trinity, and Wolfson
- Provost: Oriel, The Queen's College, and Worcester
- Rector: Exeter and Lincoln
- Dean: Christ Church
- Regent: Blackfriars

The dean of Christ Church is head of both the college and the cathedral. The president of Kellogg College was formerly also the director of the Department for Continuing Education. This changed when Kellogg president Jonathan Michie stood down as director in 2021.

== Finances ==
As of 2019 the accounts of the Oxford colleges included total assets of £6.6 billion. This figure does not reflect all the assets held by the colleges as their accounts do not include the cost or value of many of their main sites or heritage assets such as works of art or libraries. The total endowments of the colleges were £5.1 billion as of 2019. Individual college endowments ranged from £1.2m (Green Templeton) to £577.6 million (Christ Church).

== Selectivity ==
=== Postgraduate ===
In contrast to undergraduate programmes where the constituent college or hall handles both admissions and teaching, postgraduate students are admitted through a department, which is responsible for postgraduate education and supervision. As the university operates on a collegiate system, all matriculated students are required to maintain an affiliation with a college or hall which is tasked with offering student support, welfare, and accommodation. Although the University of Oxford is already selective, an additional level of selectivity exists depending on different colleges and halls. Colleges and halls differ in their levels of selectivity, as evidenced by their varying offer rates. Except All Souls College which consists principally of research fellows, Nuffield College consistently possesses the lowest offer rate and is thus considered the most selective college. On the other hand, Kellogg College and St Antony College are among the least selective colleges, typically characterised by higher offer rates.

The table below exhibits the offer rates for postgraduate applications across each college over multiple academic years.

College/ hall	2023 rate %	2022 rate %	2021 rate %
Balliol College	43.3%	41.9%	42.7%
Blackfriars Hall	85.2%	81.3%	80.7
Brasenose College	61.7%	61.7%	70.0%
Campion Hall	100%	62.5%	69.2%
Christ Church	32.2%	30.6%	36.3%
Corpus Christi College	62.2%	52.8%	67.9%
Exeter College	69.7%	72.5%	77.9%
Green Templeton College	84.0%	89.7%	86.5%
Harris Manchester College	56.4%	51.4%	58.2%
Hertford College	74.4%	73.5%	91.4%
Jesus College	49.8%	52.8%	52.5%
Keble College	65.5%	64.3%	60.1%
Kellogg College	94.8%	94.3%	92.3%
Lady Margaret Hall	89.9%	76.7%	77.6%
Linacre College	89.7%	83.3	88.2%
Lincoln College	48.4%	68.7%	60.2%
Magdalen College	19.4%	17.8%	22.8%
Mansfield College	85.0%	90.0%	75.0%
Merton College	52.3%	52.2%	45.5%
New College	47.5%	59.7%	49.8%
Nuffield College	10.4%	14.6%	9.4%
Oriel College	59.2%	62.2%	59.7%
Pembroke College	69.6%	81.1%	79.0%
The Queen's College	37.2%	43.0%	39.5%
Regent's Park College	94.7%	78.6%	88.9%
Reuben College	83.3%	68.8%	75.5%
Somerville College	71.0%	71.4%	76.4%
St Anne's College	77.3%	79.2%	90.0%
St Antony's College	95.2%	86.8%	92.2%
St Catherine's College	56.7%	65.3%	58.3%
St Cross College	82.1%	84.2%	93.7%
St Edmund Hall	70.6%	62.7%	78.6%
St Hilda's College	84.8%	69.6%	71.4%
St Hugh's College	82.6%	67.5%	86.7%
St John's College	26.3%	22.3%	24.4%
St Peter's College	88.5%	72.0%	81.3%
Trinity College	34.3%	40.3%	45.8%
University College	53.5%	53.5%	40.7%
Wadham College	65.2%	65.3%	57.1%
Wolfson College	86.6%	81.3%	85.5%
Worcester College	52.6%	48.3%	48.6%
Wycliffe Hall	86.4%	95.0%	95.5%

== Academic rankings ==
For some years, an unofficial ranking of undergraduate colleges by performance in Final Honour Schools examinations, known as the Norrington Table, was published annually. As the table only took into account the examination results for the year of publication, college rankings could fluctuate considerably.

Beginning in 2005, the University of Oxford started publishing a list of colleges classified by a "Norrington Score", effectively replicating the Norrington Table. The university claims to have published the results "in the interests of openness". Although the university says that the college listings are "not very significant", the 2005 table was the first Norrington Table with official data and also probably the first to be accurate. Dame Fiona Caldicott, the chairman of the Conference of Colleges, said that in previous years some students had used the Data Protection Act 1998 to ensure their results were not published, rendering the unofficial tables inaccurate.

== College rivalries ==
A tradition of the university is a friendly rivalry between colleges. Often, two neighbouring colleges will be rivals, and each college will pride itself in its athletic victories over the other one. Examples include:

- Jesus and Exeter
- Brasenose and Lincoln
- Balliol and Trinity
- Christ Church and Pembroke
- Keble and St John's
- St Catherine's and Magdalen
- St Hugh's and St Anne's

== Architectural influence ==
The Oxford and Cambridge colleges have served as an architectural inspiration for Collegiate Gothic Architecture, used by a number of American universities including Princeton University and Washington University in St. Louis since the late nineteenth century.

== See also ==
- List of fictional Oxford colleges
- Oxford scarf colours
- List of Oxbridge sister colleges
- Colleges of the University of Cambridge
- Colleges of Durham University
- Colleges of the University of York
