= List of University of Oxford Proctors and Assessors =

List of Oxford Proctors and Assessors

The office of Proctor at the University of Oxford dates back to medieval times. Similar roles probably came into existence with the University, although until the mid-13th century they were known as "rectors" or "taxors". The role has evolved over the centuries, but the Proctors are senior officers of the University involved in governance, student discipline and ceremonial matters.

There are two Proctors, known as the Senior Proctor and the Junior Proctor, who have equal authority and status. Historically, the designations "Senior" and "Junior" were determined by academic seniority rather than by the geographical constituencies represented by the Proctors. In modern times, the nominee who has held the Oxford MA for longer becomes Senior Proctor, and the other becomes Junior Proctor. Proctors are elected to serve for a single year, beginning on the Wednesday of the ninth week of Hilary term, usually in March.

In medieval times, the Proctors were elected annually from among the academics through a complex and indirect voting system intended to provide broad geographical representation. Following reforms under Charles I, a system was devised whereby the colleges elected Proctors in rotation. In the modern system, colleges remain on a rota and normally choose one of their own Fellows to serve.

In 1960, the office of "Representative of the Women's Colleges" was created and was subsequently renamed Assessor. The office was subsequently incorporated into the college rotation for the election of the Proctors and Assessor. The Assessor shares the Proctors' governance responsibilities and has a particular concern for student welfare.

== Proctors, 1267–1959 ==
Year assumed office	Senior Proctor	Junior Proctor
1267	Roger de Plumpton (college not recorded)	Henry de Godfree, or Godestrey (college not recorded)
1281	Robert de Burgo (college not recorded)	William de Coleshull (college not recorded)
1286	Henry de Wylie (Merton)	Robert Marmiun (college not recorded)
1288	John de la More (Merton)	Edward Farney (college not recorded)
1311	Thomas de Abendon (Merton)	Robert de Bridlyngton (Merton)
1313	Thomas de Humbleton (Balliol)	John de la Grave (Merton)
1315	Richard Abell (college not recorded)	William Barnaby (Merton)
1322	William de Skelton (Merton)	Simon de Yftele, or Eifley (Merton)
1323	William de Skelton (Merton)	John de Fenton (college not recorded)
1325	William de Harryngton (Merton)	Thomas de Bradwardyne (Merton)
1327	Anthony Goldesburgh (college not recorded)	Elias ?alwayne (college not recorded)
1331	Thomas de Reading (Merton)	William de Wytheton (college not recorded)
1333	Edward de Wyke (Merton)	John de Gotham (Merton)
1340	Adam de Potthow (Queen's)	Richard de Schrovesbury (college not recorded)
1343	Michael de Hamptesford (college not recorded)	—
1346	John Lokes (college not recorded)	William Ingestre (college not recorded)
1348	Thomas de Stretford (college not recorded)	Robert de Ingram (college not recorded)
1349	Thomas de Stretford (college not recorded)	Robert de Ingram (college not recorded)
1350	Roger de Aswardby (University)	Robert Frommund (Exeter)
1355	John de Middelton (Oriel)	Nicholas de Radyngs (Merton)
1356	John de Middelton (Oriel)	Nicholas de Radyngs (Merton)
1357	John Josekyn (Merton)	Alexander Ferebrygge (Oriel)
1358	William Deneby (Oriel)	Richard de Touworth, or Toneworth (Merton)
1360	Richard de Tone worth (Merton)	Robert de Derby (college not recorded)
1361	Simon Lambourne (Merton)	James Staunton (Oriel)
1363	Richard Sutton (Merton)	Walter Wandesford (Oriel)
1364	Walter Wandesford (Oriel)	Walter Remmesbury (Merton)
1366	William Fereby (Balliol)	Thomas Hulum, or Hulman (Merton)
1367	Adam Plumpton (Balliol)	Robert Aylesham (Merton)
1368	Robert Aylesham (Merton)	William Fereby (Balliol)
1372	Robert Hunderhull (college not recorded)	Peter de Elande (college not recorded)
1376	William Wakfeld (college not recorded)	—
1377	Thomas Lyndelow (Balliol)	John Wendover (Merton)
1379	John de Buritone (college not recorded)	Richard Pester (college not recorded)
1382	John Huntman (college not recorded)	Walter Dissy, Dish, or Dash (Oriel)
1392	John * * * (college not recorded)	Robert Rowbery (college not recorded)
1393	Stephen Brakkely (college not recorded)	Richard de Whelpyngdon (Merton)
1395	Robert Thurbury, or Thurburne (New College)	John Rote, or Roke (Oriel)
1396	John Loke (Merton)	Thomas Naffarton (University)
1399	Robert Thurbury, or Thurburne (New College)	John Rote, or Roke (Oriel)
1399	Additional or substitute officeholder; role not specified: Thomas Rodborne (Merton)	
1400	John Foster, or Forster (college not recorded)	John Brampton (college not recorded)
1401	John Foster, or Forster, again (college not recorded)	Thomas Rodeburne (Merton)
1402	John Foster, or Forster, again (college not recorded)	Thomas Rodborne (Merton)
1403	Roger Whelpdale (Queen's)	Thomas Lucas (Merton)
1404	Edmund Orsoware (college not recorded)	William Colthurst (college not recorded)
1405	Thomas Martyn (Merton)	John Castell (University)
1406	Walter Logardyn (Merton)	Adam Skelton (Queen's)
1407	William Duffield (Merton)	Richard Flemmyng (University)
1408	Richard Collyng (college not recorded)	Roger Gates (Merton)
1409	Robert Aclom (college not recorded)	Richard Baron (Merton)
1410	Richard Collyng, again (college not recorded)	Roger Orsoworth (college not recorded)
1411	John Byrch (University)	Benedict Brent (Exeter)
1412	Gilbert Kymer (Durham College)	William Symond (University)
1413	Gilbert Kymer (Durham College)	William Symond (University)
1414	Robert Cammell (college not recorded)	John Colun (college not recorded)
1415	Henry Woodchurch (Merton)	Robert Dinkeley (University)
1416	Robert Dinkeley (University)	William Andrew (Exeter)
1417	John Allwarde (Exeter)	Robert Tonge (University)
1418	William Moulton (University)	John Worthille (Balliol)
1419	Richard Heth, or Heath (college not recorded)	Richard Burneham (college not recorded)
1420	Robert Morton (Oriel)	Thomas Juster (Merton)
1421	Robert Beaumont (college not recorded)	John Hill (college not recorded)
1422	Thomas Cotes (college not recorded)	William Kyllyngmersh (University)
1423	John Bedminster (Oriel)	Robert Thwayts (Balliol)
1424	John Bedminster, again (college not recorded)	Thos. Grenley, or Grenely (Oriel)
1425	John Schireburne or Shireboune (Oriel)	William Collyng (college not recorded)
1426	Thomas Lisieux (college not recorded)	John Arundell (Exeter)
1427	Henry Sewer, or Sever (Merton)	Richard Babthorpe (college not recorded)
1428	John Wygrim (Merton)	Richard Babthorpe (college not recorded)
1429	Richard Babthorpe (college not recorded)	John Kyng, or King (college not recorded)
1430	Thomas Grant (Oriel)	Thomas Eglesfield (Queen's)
1431	William Tybart (college not recorded)	William Brandon (Balliol)
1432	William Brandon (Balliol)	John Hals (Exeter)
1433	William Dowson (University)	Roger Bulkeley (college not recorded)
1434	Michael Tregury (Exeter)	Richard Tenant (college not recorded)
1435	John Spekyngton (college not recorded)	Robert Multon (college not recorded)
1436	Wm. Croten, or Crowton (Oriel)	John Kirkby (college not recorded)
1437	John Kirkby (college not recorded)	Thomas Kemp (Merton)
1438	William Selby (New College)	Robert Flemming (University)
1439	William Orell (college not recorded)	John Willey (college not recorded)
1440	John Segden (Balliol)	Hall (college not recorded)
1440	Additional or substitute officeholder; role not specified: Richard Newbrygge (Merton)	
1441	William Saye (New College)	John Killingworth (Merton)
1442	Roger Grey (University)	Thomas Walkington (New College)
1443	William Fraunces (Merton)	John Tristrope (Lincoln)
1444	John Tristrope (Lincoln)	Thomas Chaundler (New College)
1445	William Moreton (Balliol)	Thomas Coppleston (Exeter)
1446	William Snareston (New College)	William Lambton (Balliol)
1447	John Gygur (Merton)	Walter Bate (Lincoln)
1448	John Baker (New College)	Henry Meales (college not recorded)
1449	John Wode (Merton)	William Daniel (University)
1450	Richard Luke (Balliol)	Wolstan Browne (University)
1451	William Ketill (Lincoln)	Thomas Balsall (Merton)
1452	John Ekys (listed erroneously as Magdalen)	Thomas Reynolds (Exeter); Replaced by William Moggys, or Mogys (Exeter)
1453	John Yonge (Merton)	John Seymour (All Souls)
1454	Thomas Beket (college not recorded)	Robert Norman (college not recorded)
1455	John Marshall (Merton)	Walter Windesore (Exeter)
1456	John Brether (All Souls)	Robert Abdy (Balliol)
1457	Thomas Wodehill (college not recorded)	Thomas Bemysley (University)
1458	Marten Joyner (New College)	John Molineux, sometime of (Brasenose)
1459	Stephen Brereworth (All Souls)	Thomas Lee (St Edmund Hall)
1460	Robert Ellyot (All Souls)	Thomas Purveyor (college not recorded)
1461	John Morne, or Morer (New College)	John Thorpe (Lincoln)
1462	Thomas Procter (All Souls)	Richard Dobbys (college not recorded)
1463	Walter Hyll (New College)	William Corte (Balliol)
1464	Thomas Pawnton (Lincoln)	John Payntour (Merton)
1465	Thomas Ganne (Lincoln)	William Whytwey (New College)
1466	Thomas Procter (All Souls)	William Appylby (Balliol)
1467	Richard Bernard (college not recorded)	William Sutton (college not recorded)
1468	John Harrow (Exeter)	Nicholas Langton (Lincoln)
1469	Richard Mayhew (New College)	George Strangewayee, or Strangwich (Lincoln)
1470	William Brew (Exeter)	Thomas Beston (college not recorded)
1471	Nicholas Good (Magdalen)	Richard Davis (college not recorded)
1472	William Major (Exeter)	John Acherley (All Souls)
1473	Richard Fitzjames (Merton)	John Nettylton (college not recorded)
1474	Richard Bradelegh (Exeter)	Richard Estmonde (college not recorded)
1475	William Bethum (Lincoln)	Maurice Berthram (Merton)
1476	John Bettys (All Souls)	William Southworth (Balliol)
1477	Roger Hanley (college not recorded)	Thomas Parmenter (Merton)
1478	Geoffrey Simeon (New College)	David Ireland (Magdalen)
1479	Robert Gosbourne (Merton)	John Forster (University)
1480	Nicholas Halswell (All Souls)	John Martin (Magdalen)
1481	William Porter (New College)	Ralph Hamsterley (Merton)
1482	Thomas Karvour (Magdalen)	Ralph Stanhope (Exeter)
1483	James Babbe (Exeter)	Robert Lathys (Queen's)
1484	Richard Trappe (New College)	William Craft, or Croft (Magdalen)
1485	*** Smith (college not recorded)	* * * Inglysset (college not recorded)
1486	Edmund Frowceter (Magdalen)	Robert Arden (Merton)
1487	John Hobille (New College)	William Bokhyng (college not recorded)
1488	John Husey (Magdalen)	Peter Casely (Exeter)
1489	William Hewster (Magdalen)	Robert Boorton (Merton)
1490	John North (Magdalen)	Robert Wykis (New College)
1491	John Wythers (Magdalen)	Thomas Hobbys (All Souls)
1492	John Davys (Merton)	William Lambton (college not recorded)
1493	John Jolliff (Exeter)	Richard_Barningham (Balliol)
1494	Anthony Fisher (Magdalen)	Robert Dale (Merton)
1495	William Hasard (Magdalen)	William Marbyll (college not recorded)
1496	Rowland Philipps (Oriel)	Thomas Crackinthorpe (Queen's)
1497	Thomas Drax (Lincoln)	Richard Sydnore (Magdalen)
1498	Hugh Brusey (White Hall)	John Lethome (University)
1499	Hugh Brusey (college not recorded)	Richard Halse (White Hall)
1500	Edward Darby (Lincoln)	Thomas Claydon (New College)
1501	John Game (All Souls)	William Dale (college not recorded)
1502	Hugh Hawarden (Brasenose)	John Matson, or Mackson (Merton)
1503	John Stokesley (Magdalen)	Richard Dudley (Oriel)
1504	Laurence Stubbs (Magdalen)	John Beverstone (Merton)
1505	William Patenson, or Batenson (Queen's)	John Goolde (Magdalen)
1506	Edward Colyar (University)	Richard Stokes (Magdalen)
1507	John Lane (New College)	William Thompson (University); Replaced by Hugh Poole (All Souls); Replaced by Thomas Bentley (New College)
1508	Robert Carter (Magdalen)	Rowland Messynger (University)
1509	Thos. Heretage, or Eritage (Oriel)	Richard Duck, or Doke (Exeter)
1510	John Burges, or Burgeis (Magdalen)	John Hewys (Merton)
1511	William Brooke (Oriel)	Thomas Southerne (college not recorded)
1512	Thomas Pulton (New College)	Richard Symons (Merton)
1513	Thomas Mede (Exeter)	Thomas Hobson (University)
1514	Leonard Hutchinson (Balliol)	Thomas Ware (Oriel)
1515	John Cottisford (Lincoln)	William Fossey (All Souls)
1516	Richard Walker (Merton)	Edmund Grey (New College)
1517	Thomas Irysh (Exeter)	Thomas Musgrave (Merton)
1518	John Stevyns (Oriel)	Roger Dyngley (All Souls)
1519	Thomas Flower (Lincoln)	Thomas Alyn (Brasenose)
1520	John Booth (Brasenose)	George Crofts (Oriel)
1521	Henry Tyndall (Merton)	John Wylde (college not recorded)
1522	Thomas Canner (Magdalen)	Richard Crispyne (Oriel)
1523	Thomas Canner (Magdalen)	Edmund Campion (college not recorded)
1524	Edward Leighton (Cardinal College)	Philip Bale (Exeter)
1525	Anthony Sutton (Magdalen)	John Tooker, late of (Exeter)
1526	Simon Ball (Merton)	Thomas Byrton, late of (Magdalen)
1527	Arthur Cole (Magdalen)	Richard Lorgan (Oriel)
1528	John Belletory (Merton)	Walter Buckler (Cardinal College)
1529	John Warner (All Souls)	Thomas Duke (New College)
1530	John Warner (All Souls)	Thomas Duke (New College)
1531	John Pollard (college not recorded)	George Cotes (Magdalen)
1532	William Selwood (New College)	William Pedyll (Merton)
1533	John Pekyns (Exeter)	Owen Oglethorpe (Magdalen)
1534	Dunstan Lacy (Lincoln); Replaced by John Pollet, or Pollard (college not recorded)	John Howell (All Souls)
1535	Edmund Shethor (All Souls)	John Pollet, or Pollard, again (college not recorded)
1536	William Wetherton (All Souls)	William Pye (Oriel)
1537	Hugh Weston (Lincoln)	Thomas Knight (New College)
1538	Richard Arderne (Magdalen)	Thomas Roberts (Oriel)
1539	William Smith (Brasenose)	John Stoyt (Merton)
1540	John Man (New College)	Lewis Reynold (Magdalen)
1541	Roger Bromhall, or Bromholde (New College)	John Wyman (Magdalen)
1542	John Estwyke (Merton)	William Pye (Oriel)
1543	John Estwyke (Merton)	William Pye (Oriel)
1544	Nicholas Alambrygg (All Souls)	William Smith (Brasenose)
1545	John Stoyt (Merton)	Simon Parret, or Perrot (Magdalen)
1546	John Smyth (Oriel)	Simon Parret, or Perrot (Magdalen)
1547	Edmund Crispvne (Oriel)	Henry Baylie (New College)
1548	John Redman (Magdalen)	Thomas Symons (Merton)
1549	Leonard Lyngham (Brasenose)	Richard Hughes (Magdalen)
1550	Roger Ellyot (All Souls)	Thomas Fryade (New College)
1551	William Martiall (Merton)	Peter Rogers (Christ Church)
1552	Thomas Spencer (Christ Church)	Maurice Bullock (New College)
1553	Thomas Spencer (Christ Church)	Maurice Bullock (New College)
1554	Thomas Coveney (Magdalen)	Christopher Hargreaves (Lincoln)
1555	William Northfolke (Oriel)	James Gervays, or Gervys (Merton)
1556	Henry Wotton (Christ Church); Replaced by William Allyn (Oriel)	Thomas Davys (New College)
1557	Francis Babington (All Souls)	William Allyn (Oriel)
1558	Alan Cope (Magdalen)	Walter Bailey (New College)
1559	John Daye (Magdalen)	Edw. Bramborow (New College)
1560	Robert Leech (Christ Church)	Thomas Scot (Trinity)
1561	Oliver Wythington (Brasenose)	Humphrey Hall (All Souls)
1562	Roger Marbeck (Christ Church)	Roger Giffard (Merton)
1563	Thomas Walley (Christ Church)	Roger Giffard (Merton)
1564	Roger Marbeck (Christ Church)	John Watkyns (All Souls)
1565	Thomas Garbrand, alias Herks (Magdalen)	John Meyrick (New College)
1566	William Leech (Brasenose)	William Stocker (All Souls)
1567	Adam Squire (Balliol)	Henry Bust (Magdalen)
1568	James Charnock (Brasenose)	Edmund Campion (St John's)
1569	John Bereblock (Exeter)	Thomas Bodley (Merton)
1570	Arthur Atye (Merton)	Thomas Glasier (Christ Church)
1571	Anthony Blencowe (Oriel)	Edmund Fleetwood (Merton)
1572	Anthony Blencowe (Oriel)	Edmund Fleetwood (Merton)
1573	John Tatham (Merton)	Edmund Lilly (Magdalen)
1574	John Bust (Christ Church)	Richard Barret (Oriel)
1575	John Underhill (New College)	Henry Savile (Merton)
1576	John Underhill (New College)	Henry Savile (Merton)
1577	John Glover (Christ Church)	Thomas Dochen (Magdalen)
1578	Ralph Smyth (Magdalen)	Clement Colmer (Brasenose)
1579	William Zouch (Christ Church)	Isaac Upton (Magdalen)
1580	Robert Crayne (Balliol)	Thomas Stone (Christ Church)
1581	Robert Crayne (Balliol)	Richard Maddock (All Souls); Replaced by Robert Beaumont (All Souls)
1582	Robert Cooke (Brasenose)	John Browne (Christ Church)
1583	Thomas Leyson (New College)	Richard Eedes (Christ Church)
1584	Thomas Smith (Christ Church)	Richard Mercer (Exeter)
1585	Thomas Singleton (Brasenose)	John Bennet (Christ Church)
1586	William Watkinson (Christ Church)	Giles Thompson (All Souls)
1587	George Dale (Oriel)	John Harmar (New College)
1588	Thomas Ravys (Christ Church)	Matthew Gwynne (St John's)
1589	John Harding (Magdalen)	John King (Christ Church)
1590	Jasper Colmer (Merton)	John Eveleigh (Exeter)
1591	Richard Braunche (Christ Church)	John Lloyd (New College)
1592	Thomas Savile (Merton); Replaced by Richard Fisher (Merton)	Ralph Winwood (Magdalen)
1593	William Aubrey (Christ Church)	Richard Latewar (St John's)
1594	Henry Foster (Brasenose)	Henry Cuffe (Merton)
1595	Robert Tinley (Magdalen)	William Pritchard (Christ Church)
1596	Abel Gower (Oriel)	Rowland Searchfield (St John's)
1597	John Parkhurst (Magdalen)	Richard Trafford (Merton)
1598	Edward Gee (Brasenose)	Henry Bellingham (New College)
1599	William Osbourn (All Souls)	Francis Sidney (Christ Church)
1600	Nicholas Langford (Christ Church)	Laurence Humphrey (Magdalen)
1601	George Benson (Queen's)	Gerard Massey (Brasenose)
1602	Daniel Pury (Magdalen)	Walter Bennet (New College)
1603	Christopher Dale (Merton)	William Laud (St John's)
1604	William Ballow (Christ Church)	George Darrell (All Souls)
1605	R. Fitz-Herbert (New College)	John Hanmer (All Souls)
1606	Simon Baskervyle (Exeter)	James Mabbe (Magdalen)
1607	Nathanael Brent (Merton)	John Tolson (Oriel)
1608	Edward Underhyll (Magdalen)	John Hamdon (Christ Church)
1609	Charles Greenwood (University)	John Flemmyng (Exeter)
1610	Robert Pinck (New College)	Samuel Radcliffe (Brasenose)
1611	Norwych Spackman (Christ Church)	John Dunster (Magdalen)
1612	Thomas Seller (Trinity)	Richard Corbett (Christ Church)
1613	Anth. Richardson (Queen's)	Vincent Goddard (Magdalen)
1614	Jenkin Vaughan (All Souls)	Samuel Fell (Christ Church)
1615	Hugh Dicus (Brasenose)	Richard Baylie (St John's)
1616	Robert Sanderson (Lincoln)	Charles Croke (Christ Church)
1617	Francis Grevill (Merton)	John Harris (New College)
1618	Daniel Ingoll (Queen's)	John Drope (Magdalen)
1619	Christopher Wrenn (St John's)	Brian Duppa (All Souls)
1620	Matthew Osboum (Wadham)	Samuel Smith (Magdalen); Replaced by Thomas Fox (Magdalen)
1621	Matthias Style (Exeter)	Nicholas Baylie (Corpus Christi)
1622	Griffith Higgs (Merton)	Richard Stewart (All Souls)
1623	John Smith (Magdalen)	William Oldis (New College)
1624	Daniel Estcote (Wadham)	Richard Hill (Brasenose)
1625	Nicholas Brookes (Oriel)	Samuel Marsh (Trinity)
1626	Hppton Sydenham (Magdalen)	Dionyse Prideaux (Exeter)
1627	Hugh Halswell (All Souls)	Francis Hyde (Christ Church)
1628	Robert Williamson (Magdalen)	Robert Lloyd (Jesus)
1629	Thomas Atkinson (St John's)	William Strode (Christ Church)
1630	Ralph Austen (Magdalen)	Henry Stringer (New College)
1631	A. Bruch (Brasenose); Replaced by L. Washington (Brasenose)	John Earle (Merton)
1632	Richard Chaworth (Christ Church)	John Meredith (All Souls)
1633	Thomas Whyte (Corpus Christi)	Freeman Page (Exeter)
1634	Herbert Pelham (Magdalen)	John Warren (Wadham)
1635	John Edwards (St John's)	Guy Carleton (Queen's)
1636	Thomas Browne (Christ Church)	John Good (New College)
1637	Daniel Lawford (Oriel)	John Glisson (Trinity)
1638	Edward Corbet (Merton)	John Nicholson (Magdalen)
1639	Edward Fulham (Christ Church)	Robert Heywood (Brasenose)
1640	Peter Allibond (Lincoln)	Nicholas Greaves (All Souls)
1641	Baldwyn Acland (Exeter)	Abraham Woodhead (University)
1642	Edward Young (New College)	Tristram Sugge (Wadham)
1643	George Wake (Magdalen)	William Cartwright (Christ Church); Replaced by John Maplet (Wadham)
1644	William Creed (St John's)	Francis Broad (Merton)
1645	C. Wheare (Gloucester Hall)	John Michell (Balliol)
1646	Richard Wyatt (Oriel)	Byrom Eaton (Brasenose)
1647	Robert Waring (Christ Church)	Henry Hunt (Magdalen)
1648	Joshua Crosse (Lincoln)	Ralph Button (Merton)
1649	John Maudit (Exeter)	Hierome Zanchy (All Souls)
1650	Thankful Owen (Lincoln)	Philip Stephens (New College)
1651	Matthew Unit (Trinity)	Samuel Lee (Wadham)
1652	Francis Howell (Exeter)	Peter Jarsey (Pembroke)
1653	Philip Ward (Christ Church)	Robert Gorges, (St. John's)
1654	Thomas Cracroft (Magdalen)	S. Charnock (New College)
1655	Samuel Bruen (Brasenose)	Edward & Wood (Merton); Replaced by Richard Franklin (Merton)
1656	Edward Littleton (All Souls)	William Carpender (Christ Church)
1657	Samuel Byfeild (Corpus Christi)	Samuel Conant (Exeter)
1658	George Porter (Magdalen)	Walter Pope (Wadham)
1659	George Philipps (Queen's)	Thomas Wyatt (St John's)
1660	Thomas Tanner (New College)	John Dod (Christ Church)
1661	Nicholas Meese (Trinity)	Henry Hawley (Oriel)
1662	Thomas Frankland (college not recorded)	Henry Bold (Christ Church)
1663	Hon. Nathaniel Crewe (Lincoln)	Thomas Tomkyns (All Souls)
1664	John Hearne (Exeter)	William Shippen (University)
1665	Phineas Bury (Wadham)	David Thomas (New College)
1666	Nathaniel Hodges (Christ Church)	Walter Baylie (Magdalen)
1667	George Roberts (Merton)	Edward Bernard (St John's)
1668	Richard White (St Mary Hall)	William (Durham College)
1669	Nathaniel Alsop (Brasenose)	James Davenant (Oriel)
1670	Alexander Pudsey (Magdalen)	Henry Smith (Christ Church)
1671	John Hersent (New College)	Alan Carr (All Souls)
1672	George Verman (Exeter)	Thomas Crosthwaite (Queen's)
1673	Abraham Campion (Trinity)	Nathaniel Salter (Wadham)
1674	William Frampton (Pembroke)	Thomas Huxley (Jesus)
1675	John Jones (Christ Church)	Edward Waple (St John's)
1676	Baptist Levinz (Magdalen)	Nathaniel Pelham (New College)
1677	Nathaniel Wight (Merton)	Richard Warburton (Brasenose)
1678	James Hulet (Christ Church)	John Clerke (All Souls)
1679	Samuel Norris (Exeter)	Hugh Barrow (Corpus Christi)
1680	Charles Hawles (Magdalen)	Robert Balch (Wadham)
1681	John Halton (Queen's)	Richard Oliver (St John's)
1682	Roger Altham (Christ Church)	William Dingley (New College)
1683	Henry Gandy (Oriel)	Arthur Charlett (Trinity)
1684	John Massey (Merton)	Philip Clerke (Magdalen)
1685	William Breach (Christ Church)	Thomas Smith (Brasenose)
1686	Edward Hopkins (Lincoln)	John Walrond (All Souls)
1687	Thomas Bennet (University)	John Harris (Exeter)
1688	Thomas Dunster (Wadham)	William Christmas (New College)
1689	William Cradock (Magdalen)	Thomas Newey (Christ Church)
1690	Francis Browne (Merton)	Francis Bernard (St John's)
1691	Christopher Wase (Corpus Christi)	James Gwillym (Balliol); Replaced by Adam Lugg (Balliol)
1692	William Walker (Oriel)	Benjamin Browne (Brasenose)
1693	Roger Altham (Christ Church)	Richard Vesey (Magdalen)
1694	Gabriel Barnaby (New College)	Stephen Napleton (All Souls)
1695	John Bagwell (Exeter)	John Waugh (Queen's)
1696	Henry Edmonds (Trinity)	William Baker (Wadham)
1697	Charles Sloper (Pembroke)	Griffin Davies (Jesus)
1698	Edw. Lilly (St John's)	Robert Freind (Christ Church)
1699	Richard Watkins (Magdalen)	T. Mompesson (New College)
1700	John Holland (Merton)	William Thompson (Brasenose)
1701	John Pelling (Christ Church)	Richard Coleire (All Souls)
1702	John Cooke (Exeter)	Edmund Perkes (Corpus Christi)
1703	Samuel Adams (Magdalen)	John Eyane (Wadham)
1704	Joseph Smith (Queen's)	Thomas Smith (St John's)
1705	Brune Bickley (New College)	Peter Foulkes (Christ Church)
1706	George Carter (Oriel)	Edw. Crank (Trinity)
1707	William Turton (Magdalen)	Henry Stephens (Merton)
1708	James Smethurst (Brasenose); Replaced by Thomas Stanley (Brasenose)	Thomas Terry (Christ Church)
1709	William Vesey (Lincoln)	R. Adderley (All Souls)
1710	William Denison (University)	William Williams (Exeter)
1711	William Bradshaw (New College)	Thomas Girdler (Wadham)
1712	Seth Eyre (Magdalen)	William Periam (Christ Church)
1713	Edw. Morse (St John's)	Henry Byne (Merton)
1714	Charles Gardiner (Corpus Christi)	Samuel Newte (Balliol)
1715	William Bering (Oriel)	Thomas Dcd (Brasenose)
1716	Charles Holt (Magdalen)	John White (Christ Church)
1717	John Stead (All Souls)	W. Beaumont (New College)
1718	T. Troughear (Queen's)	Robert Rogers (Exeter)
1719	George Shepheard (Trinity)	John Baker (Wadham); Replaced by John Chandler (Wadham)
1720	Robert Brynker (Jesus)	Benjamin Slocock (Pembroke)
1721	Henry Gregory (Christ Church)	William Holmes (St John's)
1722	Ralph Webb (Magdalen)	Henry Levitt (New College)
1723	Richard Streat (Merton)	Rob. Leyborne (Brasenose)
1724	William Le Hunt (Christ Church)	Rob. Eyre (All Souls)
1725	John Conybeare (Exeter)	Barnaby Smith (Corpus Christi)
1726	George Newland (Magdalen)	Philip Speke (Wadham)
1727	John Borrett (Queen's)	John Smith (St John's)
1728	Carew Reynell (New College)	Robert Manaton (Christ Church)
1729	George Huddesford (Trinity)	John Woollin (Oriel)
1730	Joseph Andrews (Magdalen)	Thomas Robinson (Merton)
1731	Thomas Foxley (Brasenose)	Oliver Batteley (Christ Church)
1732	Richard Hitchins (Lincoln)	William Wynne (All Souls)
1733	Robert Eden (University)	James Edgcumbe (Exeter)
1734	John Cox (New College)	William Thomas (Wadham)
1735	William Wightwick (Magdalen)	Bern. Dowdeswell (Christ Church)
1736	John Stevens (Merton)	William Derham (St John's)
1737	Thomas Paget (Corpus Christi)	John Land (Balliol)
1738	Edw. Trahern (Brasenose)	Edw. Rayner (Oriel)
1739	John Whitfield (Christ Church)	Peter Zinzan (Magdalen)
1740	Richard Lydiatt (New College)	Savage Tyndall (All Souls)
1741	Francis Webber (Exeter)	John Lowry (Queen's)
1742	John Bruere (Trinity)	George Costard (Wadham)
1743	James Le Marchant (Jesus)	John Collins (Pembroke)
1744	Richard Hind (Christ Church)	John Lloyd (St John's)
1745	Thomas Waldegrave (Magdalen)	Robert Speed (New College)
1746	William Williamson (Merton)	Thomas Cawley (Brasenose)
1747	George Bingham (All Souls)	Joseph Jane (Christ Church)
1748	James Fortescue (Exeter)	John Baker (Corpus Christi)
1749	Thomas Townson (Magdalen)	Prince Pead (Wadham)
1750	Francis Harrison (Queen's)	William Cockayne (St John's)
1751	George Smith (New College)	Samuel Dickens (Christ Church)
1752	Thomas Chapman (Trinity)	Gilbert White (Oriel)
1753	Christopher Robinson (Magdalen)	Christopher Twynihoe (Merton)
1754	Matthew Maddock (Brasenose)	Edward Smallwell (Christ Church)
1755	John Tracy, 7th Viscount Tracy of Rathcoole (All Souls)	Charles Mortimer (Lincoln)
1756	John Coulson (University)	John Fowell (Exeter)
1757	John Eyre (New College)	Francis Lernoult (Wadham)
1758	William Holwell (Christ Church)	George Horne (Magdalen)
1759	William Wright (Merton)	George Austen (St John's)
1760	John Vivian (Balliol)	Richard Skinner (Corpus Christi)
1761	Thomas Barker (Brasenose)	Thomas Nowell (Oriel)
1762	Ellis Jones (Christ Church)	Richard Scrape (Magdalen)
1763	George James Sale (New College)	John Long (All Souls)
1764	Thomas Nicholson (Queen's)	George Stinton (Exeter)
1765	William Huddesford (Trinity)	George Smyth (Wadham)
1766	Nathaniel Haines (Pembroke)	James Bandinel (Jesus)
1767	Francis Atterbury (Christ Church)	Samuel Vickers (St John's)
1768	Benjamin Wheeler (Magdalen)	E. Whitmore (New College)
1769	James Norman (Merton)	Henry Mayer (Brasenose)
1770	William Conybeare (Christ Church)	J. E. Hayward (All Souls)
1771	John Russell (Corpus Christi)	C. Tirrel Morgan (Exeter)
1772	Richard Chandler (Magdalen)	James Foster (Wadham)
1773	Edw. Bowerbank (Queen's)	E. D. Shackleford (St John's)
1774	Joshua Berkeley (Christ Church)	John Webber (New College)
1775	Richard Head (Oriel)	Joseph Chapman (Trinity)
1776	Richard Wooddeson (Magdalen)	Scrope Berdmore (academic) (Merton)
1777	John Foley (Brasenose)	Thomas Pettingal (Christ Church)
1778	George Watkin (Lincoln)	Joseph Ingram (All Souls)
1779	John Sarraude (Exeter)	Philip Fisher (University)
1780	W. Cooke (New College)	Alexander Litchfield (Wadham)
1781	Charles Williams (Magdalen)	John Randolph (Christ Church)
1782	Thomas Hardcastle (Merton)	James Davenport (St John's)
1783	Richard Prosser (Balliol)	Charles Tahourdin (Corpus Christi)
1784	William Stalman (Brasenose)	Henry Beeke (Oriel)
1785	Phineas Pett (Christ Church)	Martin Joseph Routh (Magdalen)
1786	John Coker (New College)	Hon. D. Finch (All Souls)
1787	Henry Smith (Queen's)	Richard Vivian (Exeter)
1788	Edw. Whitley (Wadham)	J. Bankes Moulding (Trinity)
1789	Thomas Phillips (Pembroke)	Edward Morgan (Jesus)
1790	C. Buckeridge (St John's)	C. T. Barker (Christ Church)
1791	Francis Whitcombe (Magdalen)	Thomas Boys (New College)
1792	Thomas Wright (Brasenose)	Robert Wall (Merton)
1793	Clement Cartwright (All Souls)	Charles Henry Hall (Christ Church)
1794	William Filmer (Corpus Christi)	John Cole (Exeter)
1795	Henry Davis (Wadham)	George Hutton (Magdalen)
1796	William Benson (Queen's)	Thomas Whitfield (St John's)
1797	William Blair (New College)	George Illingworth (Christ Church)
1798	James Landon (Oriel)	James W. Alexander (Trinity)
1799	William Cornish Ellis (Merton); Replaced by Egerton Robert Neve (Merton); Replaced by Samuel Perrott Parker (Merton)	Thomas Butler (Magdalen)
1800	John Tench (Brasenose)	William Wood (Christ Church)
1801	G. F. Nott (All Souls)	G. S. Faber (Lincoln)
1802	Edward Rodd (Exeter)	Henry Wetherell (University)
1803	Brian Broughton (New College)	Richard Michell (Wadham)
1804	Edward Ellerton (Magdalen)	Fred. Barnes (Christ Church)
1805	P. Vaughan (Merton)	T. G. Clare (St John's)
1806	William Marshall (Balliol)	Richard Budd (Corpus Christi)
1807	John Dean (Brasenose)	Edward Copleston (Oriel)
1808	William Come (Christ Church)	J. Goldesbrough (Magdalen)
1809	F. H. Brickenden (Worcester)	William Everett (New College)
1810	Stephen P. Rigaud (Exeter); Replaced by Joseph Prust Pmst (Exeter)	Henry Wheatley (Queen's)
1811	E. S. Stevens (Wadham)	James Ford (Trinity)
1812	Charles Wightwick (Pembroke)	Thomas Davies (Jesus)
1813	H. N. Pearson (St John's)	Kenneth M. E. Tarpley (Christ Church)
1814	William Aldrich (Magdalen)	B. Bandinel (New College)
1815	Francis Rowden (Merton)	Richard Stephens (Brasenose)
1816	E. Goodenough (Christ Church)	C. Wrottesley (All Souls)
1817	Thomas Darke (Exeter)	W. H. Turner (Corpus Christi)
1818	B. P. Symons (Wadham)	William Russell (Magdalen)
1819	William Wilson (Queen's)	Nathaniel Dodson (St John's)
1820	P. N. Shuttleworth (New College); Replaced by A. C. Price (New College)	John Bull (Christ Church)
1821	William James (Oriel)	William M. Kinsey (Trinity)
1822	John Moore (Worcester)	Thomas Sheriffe (Magdalen)
1823	Thomas V. Short (Christ Church)	James Smith (Brasenose)
1824	John Calcott (Lincoln)	E. W. Huntley (All Souls)
1825	William Dalby (Exeter)	John Watts (University)
1826	G. C. Eashleigh (New College)	—
1827	Charles T. Longley (Christ Church)	Andrew Edwards (Magdalen)
1828	W. A. Bouverie (Merton)	C. L. Swainson (St John's)
1829	James Thomas Bound (Balliol)	Robert Alder Thorp (Corpus Christi)
1830	Joseph Dornford (Oriel)	Thomas T. Churton (Brasenose)
1831	Daniel Veysie (Christ Church)	E. M. White (Magdalen)
1832	Francis Clerke (All Souls)	Richard Young (New College)
1833	Henry A. Dodd (Queen's)	John P. Lightfoot (Exeter)
1834	James Hardwick Dyer (Trinity)	William Harding (Wadham)
1835	Edmund G. Bayley (Pembroke)	Robert Evans (Jesus); Replaced by Henry Eeynolds, Jesue (college not recorded)
1836	Robert Hussey (Christ Church)	Henry Thorpe (St John's); Replaced by L. A. Sharpe (St John's)
1837	W. J. Butler (Magdalen)	William Meech (New College)
1838	William Ricketts (Merton)	T. T. Bazely (Brasenose)
1839	Jacob Ley (Christ Church)	A. G. Lethbridge (All Souls)
1840	Edward A. Dayman (Exeter)	James Frederick Crouch (Corpus Christi)
1841	John Foley (Wadham)	William W. Tireman (Magdalen); Replaced by John P. Wilson (Magdalen)
1842	William Monkhouse (Queen's)	J. S. Pinkerton (St John's)
1843	A. D. Stacpoole (New College)	William Edward Jelf (Christ Church)
1844	Henry P. Guillemard (Trinity)	Richard William Church (Oriel)
1845	Thomas Harris (Magdalen)	John T. H. Peter (Merton)
1846	Henry George Liddell (Christ Church); Replaced by Osbprne Gordon (Christ Church)	Thomas Chaffers (Brasenose)
1847	James Hannay (Worcester)	Martin Johnson Green (Lincoln)
1848	William Andrews (Exeter)	Thomas Shadforth (University)
1849	Henry Thomas May (New College)	John Cooper (Wadham)
1850	George Marshall (Christ Church)	William Henderson (Magdalen)
1851	John Hungerford Pollen (Merton)	James Gram Brine (St John's)
1852	William Charles Lake (Balliol)	Henry Pritchard (Corpus Christi)
1853	Drummond Percy Chase (Oriel)	John William Knott (Brasenose)
1854	Robert Cholmeley (Magdalen)	Edward Stokes (Christ Church)
1855	J. M. Holland (New College)	Arthur F. Stopford (All Souls); Replaced by George Fereman (All Souls)
1856	Edward Boucher James (Queen's)	William Ince (Exeter)
1857	Edward Wyndham Tufnell (Wadham)	Frederick Meyrick (Trinity)
1858	Charles Wilson Heaton (Jesus)	Bartholomew Price (Pembroke)
1859	Edw. Tindal Turner (Brasenose)	Thos. Jones Prout (Christ Church); Replaced by Charles Waldegrave Sandford (Christ Church)
1860	Robert Gandell (Magdalen)	James Henry Eld (St John's)
1861	William Basil Jones (University)	George Ridding (Exeter)
1862	James Riddell (Balliol)	Thomas Fowler (Lincoln)
1863	William Chambers (Worcester)	George William Kitchin (Christ Church)
1864	Stephen Edwardes (Merton)	Francis Harrison (Oriel)
1865	Henry Furneaux (Corpus Christi)	William Wolfe Capes (Queen's)
1866	James John Hornby (Brasenose); Replaced by William Yates (Brasenose)	George Earlam Thorley (Wadham)
1867	Thomas Vere Bayne (Christ Church)	Charles E. Hammond (Exeter)
1868	Chas. H. Cholmeley (Magdalen)	William Gordon Cole (Trinity)
1869	Charles Lee Wingfield (All Souls)	Walter F. Short (New College)
1870	Henry Deane (St John's)	Henry L. Thompson (Christ Church)
1871	Edward Moore (St Edmund Hall)	James Lee Warner (University)
1872	Thomas Douglas Page (Pembroke)	William W. Jackson (Exeter)
1873	Charles Henry Olive Daniel (Worcester)	Ingram Bywater (Exeter)
1874	Herbert Salwey (Christ Church)	John Wordsworth (Brasenose)
1875	Charles Lancelot Shadwell (Oriel)	James Richard Thursfield (Jesus)
1876	John Richard Magrath (Queen's)	Patrick A. Henderson (Wadham)
1877	Henry George Woods (Trinity)	Hugh Edward P. Platt (Lincoln)
1878	William Wallace (Merton)	John Barclay Thompson (Christ Church)
1879	Henry Francis Pelham (Exeter)	William Little (Corpus Christi)
1880	Albert Sidney Chavasse (University)	Frederick Edward Warren (St John's)
1881	Clement Nugent Jackson (Hertford)	Charles Buller Heberden (Brasenose)
1882	Henry Scott Holland (Christ Church)	Arthur Lionel Smith (Trinity)
1883	Walter Lock (Magdalen)	Rowland Edmund Prothero (All Souls)
1884	Richard William Massy Pope (Worcester)	William Leonard Courtney (New College)
1885	John Lancaster Gough Mowat (Pembroke)	John Cook Wilson (Oriel)
1886	Herbert Paul Richards (Wadham)	Richard Shute (Christ Church); Replaced by Robert E. Baynes (Christ Church)
1887	Charles Leudesdorf (Pembroke)	Edwin Bailey Elliott (Queen's)
1888	Franklin Thomas Richards (Trinity)	William Hawker Hughes (Jesus)
1889	John Wellesley Russell (Merton)	Andrew Clark (Lincoln)
1890	Charles Plummer (Corpus Christi)	William James Heathcote Campion (Keble)
1891	William Holden Hutton (St John's)	Lewis Amherst Selby-Bigge (University)
1892	Joseph Hooper Maude (Hertford)	Alfred Joshua Butler (Brasenose)
1893	Arthur Hassall (Christ Church)	William Ross Hardie (Balliol)
1894	George Edward Underhill (Magdalen)	Charles William Chadwick Oman (All Souls)
1895	Percy Ewing Matheson (New College)	Henry Tresawna Gerrans (Worcester)
1896	Lewis Richard Farnell (Exeter)	Langford Lovell Frederick Rice Price (Oriel)
1897	Joseph Wells (Wadham)	James Bernard Baker (Non-Collegiate)
1898	Edward Mewburn Walker (Queen's)	William Henry Hadow (Worcester)
1899	Wallace Martin Lindsay (Jesus); Replaced by William Carmont Allsebrook (Jesus)	Herbert Edward Douglas Blakiston (Trinity)
1900	Walter Wybergh How (Merton)	John Arthur Ruskin Munro (Lincoln)
1901	John Tracey (Keble)	Henry Devinish Leigh (Corpus Christi); Replaced by Arthur Ernest Jolliffe (Corpus Christi)
1902	Arthur Blackburne Poynton (University)	Percy Elford (St John's)
1903	Charles Edward Haselfoot (Hertford)	Francis James Wylie (Brasenose)
1904	Edwin James Palmer (Balliol)	John Linton Myres (Christ Church)
1905	Clement Charles Julian Webb (Magdalen)	Charles Grant Robertson (All Souls)
1906	Horace William Brindley Joseph (New College)	Henry Julian Cunningham (Worcester)
1907	George Chatterton Richards (Oriel)	Willoughby Charles Allen (Exeter)
1908	John Frederick Stenning (Wadham)	Ernest Barker (Merton)
1909	Walter Ramsden (Pembroke)	George Bernard Cronshaw (Queen's)
1910	Alfred Ernest William Hazel (Jesus)	Melville Watson Patterson (Trinity)
1911	John Charles Miles (Merton)	Edward Irving Carlyle (Lincoln)
1912	William Henry Vincent Reade (Keble)	Richard Winn Livingstone (Corpus Christi)
1913	Arthur Spenser Loat Farquharson (University)	John Leofric Stocks (St John's)
1914	Alfred James Jenkinson (Brasenose)	Edward Arthur Burroughs (Hertford)
1915	Edward Hilliard (Balliol)	John Davidson Beazley (Christ Church)
1916	James Matthew Thompson (Magdalen)	Herbert Henry Edmund Craster (All Souls)
1917	Francis John Lys (Worcester)	Hugh Percy Allen (New College)
1918	Francis Henry Hall (Oriel)	Robert Ranulph Marett (Exeter)
1919	John Frederick Stenning (Wadham)	Wilfrid George Kendrew (Non-Collegiate)
1920	Gerald Burton Allen (Pembroke)	Herbert James Paton (Queen's)
1921	David Leonard Chapman (Jesus)	John Reginald Homer Weaver (Trinity)
1922	Victor John Knight Brook (Lincoln)	Frederick Wastie Green (Merton)
1923	William Phelps (Corpus Christi)	David Capell Simpson (Keble)
1924	Austin Lane Poole (St John's)	Carleton Kemp Allen (University)
1925	William Teulon Swan Stallybrass (Brasenose)	John Dewar Denniston (Hertford)
1926	Kenneth Norman Bell (Balliol)	Theodore William Chaundy (Christ Church)
1927	Ernest Llewellyn Woodward (All Souls)	Edward Murray Wrong (Magdalen); Replaced by Henry Michael Denne Parker (Magdalen)
1928	Cyril Hackett Wilkinson (Worcester)	Stanley Casson (New College)
1929	Leonard Halford Dudley Buxton (Exeter)	George Norman Clark (Oriel)
1930	Reginald Trevor Davies (Non-Collegiate)	Cecil Maurice Bowra (Wadham)
1931	Arnold Brian Burrowes (Pembroke)	Harry Wilfred House (Queen's)
1932	Thomas Farrant Higham (Trinity)	John Goronwy Edwards (Jesus)
1933	Harold Greville Hanbury (Lincoln)	Idris Deane-Jones (Merton)
1934	George David Parkes (Keble)	William Francis Ross Hardie (Corpus Christi)
1935	William Conrad Costin (St John's)	Edmund John Bowen (University)
1936	Cecil Herbert Stuart Fifoot (Hertford)	James Ivor McKie (Brasenose)
1937	Charles Richard Morris (Balliol)	Gilbert Ryle (Christ Church)
1938	Thomas Dewar Weldon (Magdalen)	Richard Pares (All Souls)
1939	Armitage Noel Bryan-Brown (Worcester)	Ernest Henry Phelps Brown (New College); Replaced by Stanley Powell McCallum (New College)
1940	John Wiedhofft Gough (Oriel)	Neville Henry Kendal Aylmer Coghill (Exeter)
1941	Reginald Trevor Davies (St Catherine's Society)	John Harold Crossley Thompson (Wadham)
1942	Ronald Buchanan McCallum (Pembroke)	John Walter Jones (Queen's)
1943	Alfred Ewert (Trinity)	Leslie Basil Cross (Jesus)
1944	Harold Greville Hanbury (Lincoln)	Harold Oliver Newboult (Merton)
1945	Cecil Vere Davidge (Keble)	Charles Haynes Wilson (Corpus Christi)
1946	Edwin Slade (St John's)	Giles Alington (University)
1947	Felix Maurice Hippisley Markham (Hertford)	Eric George Collieu (Brasenose)
1948	Denys Lionel Page (Christ Church)	Richard William Southern (Balliol)
1949	Thomas Dunbabin (All Souls)	John Langshaw Austin (Magdalen)
1950	Alan Brown (Worcester)	J.B. Butterworth (New College)
1951	A. G. M. Widdell (Oriel)	W. G. Barr (Exeter)
1952	Basil Naylor (St Peter's)	John Bamborough (Wadham)
1953	Anthony D. Woozley (Queen's)	Charles Neville Ward-Perkins (Pembroke)
1954	Michael Maclagan (Trinity)	Edward Crossley Thompson (Jesus)
1955	Philip Dixon Watson (Merton)	Patrick David Henderson (Lincoln)
1956	Basil George Mitchell (Keble)	Michael Brock (Corpus Christi)
1957	William Holmes (St John's)	Peter Bayley (University)
1958	J. A. Barltrop (Brasenose)	C. R. Ross (Hertford)
1959	Robert N. W. Blake (Christ Church)	M. W. Dick (Balliol); Replaced by F. L. M. Willis-Bund (Balliol)

== Proctors and the Representative of Women's Colleges, 1960–1961 ==
Year assumed office	Senior Proctor	Junior Proctor	Representative of Women's Colleges
1960	B. B. Lloyd (Magdalen)	Peter Marshall Fraser (All Souls)	Anne Whiteman (Lady Margaret Hall)
1961	John Sanders (Oriel)	George Hall (Exeter)	Betty Kemp (St Hugh's)

== Proctors and Assessors, 1962–present ==
Year assumed office	Senior Proctor	Junior Proctor	Assessor
1962	John Merlin Thomas (New College)	David Mitchell (Worcester)	Rachel Jean Banister (Somerville)
1963	John Davies (St Catherine's)	John Bryce McLeod (Wadham)	Muriel Louise Tomlinson (St Hilda's)
1964	Godfrey Bond (Pembroke)	Bernard McGuinness (Queen's)	Margaret Hubbard (St Anne's)
1965	David C. M. Yardley (St Edmund Hall)	Charles Caine (St Peter's)	Harry Taylor Willetts (St Antony's)
1966	Robin Fletcher (Trinity)	Colin Williamson (Jesus)	Claire Milward O'Brien (Lady Margaret Hall)
1967	John Morris Roberts (Merton)	Alfred Simpson (Lincoln)	Uwe Kitzinger (Nuffield)
1968	Charles Smith (Keble)	Robert Gasser (Corpus Christi)	Barbara Harvey (Somerville)
1969	Roger Elliot (St John's)	Anthony Firth (University)	Thomas Halsall (Linacre)
1970	David Leonard Stockton (Brasenose)	John Robert Torrance (Hertford)	Susan Meriel Wood (St Hugh's)
1971	Handel Davies (Christ Church)	Patrick George Henry Sandars (Balliol)	Alan Jones (St Cross)
1972	John David Feltham (Magdalen)	Robin Briggs (All Souls)	Margaret Rayner (St Hilda's)
1973	James Campbell (Worcester)	Gareth Vaughan Bennett (New College)	Desmond Kay (Wolfson)
1974	Dermot James Roaf (Exeter)	Bernard Anthony Rudden (Oriel)	Hazel Swaine Rossotti (St Anne's)
1975	Brian Fender (St Catherine's)	R. P. Martineau (Wadham)	Harold Shukman (St Antony's)
1976	Hugh Hill (Queen's)	John Fleeman (Pembroke)	Anne Hudson (Lady Margaret Hall)
1977	Justin Cyril Bertrand Gosling (St Edmund Hall)	Martin Beynon Powell (St Peter's)	John Stanton Flemming (Nuffield)
1978	Roderick Martin (Trinity)	Peter John Clarke (Jesus)	Miriam Tamara Griffin (Somerville)
1979	Richard Cooper Repp (Linacre)	Vijay Ramchandra Joshi (Merton)	Eric Sidebottom (Lincoln)
1980	Theodora Constance Cooper (St Hugh's)	Paul Martin Hayes (Keble)	Michael John Collins (University)
1981	Christopher Charles Whiston Taylor (Corpus Christi)	Robert Edwin White (St Cross)	John William White (St John's)
1982	Ian Christopher Butler (Christ Church)	Richard Anthony Cooper (Brasenose)	Hilda Meldrum Brown (St Hilda's)
1983	Edward Lawrence Hussey (All Souls)	Roger John Van Noorden (Hertford)	Richard Anthony Warren Bladon (Wolfson)
1984	William Herbert Newton-Smith (Balliol)	Ralph Charles Sutherland Walker (Magdalen)	Edward Peter Wilson (Worcester)
1985	Ruth Lynn Deech (St Anne's)	Lauchlan Glenn Black (Oriel)	Alan James Ryan (New College)
1986	Malcolm Douglas Deas (St Antony's)	Paul Alexander Slack (Exeter)	Michael Brian Gearin-Tosh (St Catherine's)
1987	Peter Michael Neumann (Queen's)	Gabrielle Anne Stoy (Lady Margaret Hall)	John Sebastian Knowland (Pembroke)
1988	David John Mabberley (Wadham)	David Leslie Miller (Nuffield)	Christopher John Wells (St Edmund Hall)
1989	Peter Copeman Newell (St Peter's)	Peter Nicholas Mirfield (Jesus)	Jeffrey Kenneth Aronson (Green College)
1990	Joanna Mary Innes (Somerville)	Colin John Crouch (Trinity)	Philip John Waller (Merton)
1991	John Norbury (Lincoln)	Howard Morphy (Linacre)	David Michael Patrick Mingos (Keble)
1992	John Frederick Iles (St Hugh's)	Martin Hubie Matthews (University)	David Sebastian Fairweather (Corpus Christi)
1993	Philip Albert Allen (St Cross)	Elizabeth Anne Fallaize (St John's)	John Spencer Rowett (Brasenose)
1994	Judith Pallot (Christ Church)	Anita Avramides (St Hilda's)	John Maxwell Landers (All Souls)
1995	Jeremy A. Black (Wolfson)	William D. MacMillan (Hertford)	Penelope Bulloch (Balliol)
1996	John Garfitt (Magdalen)	Jeremy Horder (Worcester)	Nigel Bowles (St Anne's)
1997	Martin E. Ceadel (New College)	Annette M. Volfing (Oriel)	Roger Goodman (St Antony's)
1998	Roger Ainsworth (St Catherine's)	Michael Hart (Exeter)	Angus Bowie (Queen's)
1999	Richard Jenkyns (Lady Margaret Hall)	Paul Smith (Pembroke)	Richard Mayou (Nuffield)
2000	Martin D. E. Slater (St Edmund Hall)	Richard Sharpe (Wadham)	Laurence Goldman (St Peter's)
2001	David Womersley (Jesus)	Geoffrey Walford (Green)	Bryan Roe Ward-Perkins (Trinity)
2002	Tim P. Softley (Merton)	Elizabeth A. Chapman (Somerville)	Stephen Parkinson (Linacre)
2003	David A. Hills (Lincoln)	Ian W. Archer (Keble)	Thomas C. Buchanan (Kellogg)
2004	John F. Wheater (University)	Judith D. Maltby (Corpus Christi)	David J. Walker (St Hugh's)
2005	Alan Grafen (St John's)	Ron W. Daniel (Brasenose)	F. N. Pieke (St Cross)
2006	Stephen J. Goss (Wadham)	Sally Mapstone (St Hilda's)	Catherine C. L. Andreyev (Christ Church)
2007	James A. Forder (Balliol)	Marcus J. Banks (Wolfson)	Paul Coones (Hertford)
2008	Donald Gordon Fraser (Worcester)	D. A. Harris (St Anne's)	John Nightingale, Lord Cromarty (Magdalen)
2009	Martin Williams (New College)	Philip Robins (St Antony's)	John B. Muddiman (Mansfield)
2010	Colin P. Thompson (St Catherine's)	Nicholas Bamforth (Queen's)	Eric Eve (Harris Manchester)
2011	Laurence Whitehead (Nuffield)	Brian Rogers (Pembroke)	Teresa J Morgan (Oriel)
2012	Huw Richard Dorkins (St Peter's)	Amy Beth Zavatsky (St Edmund Hall)	Helen Spencer (Exeter)
2013	Jonathan Mallinson (Trinity)	Rebecca Surender (Green Templeton)	Penny Probert Smith (Lady Margaret Hall)
2014	Kate L. Blackmon (Merton)	Hubert Ertl (Linacre)	Paul Martin (Wadham)
2015	George Garnett (St Hugh's)	Lisa Bendall (Keble)	Patricia Daley (Jesus)
2016	Mark Whittow (Corpus Christi)	Elizabeth Gemmill (Kellogg)	Luke Pitcher (Somerville)
2017	Edward Bispham (Brasenose)	Dan Hicks (St Cross)	Stefan Enchelmaier (Lincoln)
2018	Mark Edwards (Christ Church)	Cécile Fabre (All Souls)	William Allan (University)
2019	Martin Maiden (Hertford)	Sophie Marnette (Balliol)	William Whyte (St John's)
2020	Simon Horobin (Magdalen)	Freya Johnston (St Anne's)	Helen Swift (St Hilda's)
2021	Lucinda Rumsey (Mansfield)	David Johnson (St Antony's)	Bettina Lange (Wolfson)
2022	Jane Mellor (Queen's)	Linda M. Flores (Pembroke)	Richard Earl (Worcester)
2023	Kathryn Murphy (Oriel)	David Kirk (Nuffield)	Joseph Conlon (New College)
2024	Thomas Adcock (St Peter's)	Conall Mac Niocaill (Exeter)	Benjamin Bollig (St Catherine's)
2025	Nicholas Barber (Trinity)	Grant Tapsell (Lady Margaret Hall)	Raphael Hauser (Pembroke)
2026	Andrew Farmery (Wadham)	Caroline Warman (Jesus)	Jeff Tseng (St Edmund Hall)
