= Bamforth =

Bamforth is a surname. Notable people with the surname include:

- Adrian Bamforth, British comic book artist
- Charles Bamforth (born 1952), British scientist
- Nicholas Bamforth, British legal scholar
- Rosemary Bamforth (1924–2018), Scottish pathologist
- Scott Bamforth (born 1989), American-Kosovan basketball player
- Vic Bamforth (born 1952), British glass artist
