= Walter Bailey =

Walter Bailey may refer to:

- Walter Bailey (lawyer), state prosecutor in South Carolina
- Walter T. Bailey (1882–1941), American architect from Kewanee, Illinois
- Walter Bailey (footballer) (1876–?), English footballer

== See also ==
- Walter Bayley (1529–1593), English physician
- Harold Walter Bailey (1899–1996), English scholar of languages
- Walter Lewis Baily Jr. (1930–2013), American mathematician
