= Rossotti =

Rossotti is a surname. Notable people with the surname include:

- Charles O. Rossotti (born 1941), American businessman
- Hazel Rossotti (1930–2023), British chemist and science writer
