= E. H. Pember =

English barrister (1833–1911)

E. H. Pember KC JP

Personal details
- Born: Edward Henry Pember; 28 May 1833 Clapham Park, Surrey, England
- Died: 5 April 1911 (aged 77)

Edward Henry Pember (28 May 1833 – 5 April 1911) was an English barrister and literary figure. He was a prominent member of the parliamentary bar.

== Biography ==
The eldest son of John Edward Rose Pember of Clapham Park, Surrey, by his wife Mary, daughter of Arthur Robson, he was born at his father's house on 28 May 1833. He was educated at Harrow, and after reading for a short time with the Rev. T. Elwin, headmaster of Charterhouse School, a noted teacher, he matriculated on 23 May 1850 at Christ Church, Oxford, where he was elected a student in 1854. He took a first class in classical moderations in 1852, and in 1854 he was placed in the first class in literæ humaniores, and in the third class of the newly founded school of law and modern history.

He entered as a student of Lincoln's Inn on 2 May 1855, reading in the chambers first of the conveyancer Joseph Burrell and then of George Markham Giffard, afterwards lord justice. Called to the bar on 26 January 1858, he chose the Midland circuit, and laid himself out for common law practice; briefs were slow in coming when a fortunate accident introduced him to the parliamentary bar. For that class of work and tribunal Pember was admirably equipped. His fine presence, his command of flowing classical English, together with his quickness of comprehension and his readiness in repartee, soon made him a prime favourite with the committees of both houses. Edmund Beckett (afterwards Lord Grimthorpe) and George Stovin Venables were then the chiefs of the parliamentary bar, but Pember more than held his own with them, and after they were gone he disputed the lead at Westminster for over thirty years with such formidable rivals as Samuel Pope [q. v. Suppl. II] and (Sir) Ralph Littler.

Perhaps the greatest achievement in his forensic career was his conduct of the bill for creating the Manchester Ship Canal, which was passed in July 1885 in the teeth of the most strenuous opposition; Pember's reply for the promoters, which was largely extemporary, was one of the most effective speeches ever delivered in a parliamentary committee room. His speeches as a rule were most carefully prepared, and were fine examples of literary style. His treatment of witnesses was not always adroit, and he was over-prone to argument with experts and men of science; but his straightforwardness gave him the full confidence of those before whom he practised. In April 1897 he appeared as counsel for Cecil Rhodes before the parliamentary committee appointed to investigate the origin and attendant circumstances of the Jameson raid. Pember took silk in 1874, was made a bencher of his Inn in 1876, and served the office of treasurer in 1906–7. He retired from practice in 1903 in full vigour of mind and body. He died after a short illness on 5 April 1911, at his Hampshire home. Vicar's Hill, Lymington, and was buried at Boldre Church, Brockenhurst.

Pember was throughout his fife a prominent figure in the social and literary life of London. A brilliant talker, he was one of the most regular and welcome attendants at the dinners of ’The Club.' From 1896 to 1911 he acted as joint secretary of the Dilettanti Society, and in 1909 his portrait was painted for that body by Sir Edward Poynter, R.A. He was an accomplished musician, having studied singing under Perugini and possessing considerable technical theoretical knowledge. In 1910 Pember was elected perpetual secretary of the newly formed academic committee of the Royal Society of Literature. During the days of waiting at the bar he was a constant contributor to the weekly press, and he is generally credited with the famous epigram on Lord Westbury's judgment in the 'Essays and Reviews' case — 'Hell dismissed with costs.' Some extracts from a mock Newdigate poem of his, 'On the Feast of Belshazzar' (the subject for 1852, when the prize was awarded to Edwin Arnold), were long current in Oxford. Widely read in general literature and highly critical in taste, he found relaxation and amusement in the making of vers de société, and of translations and adaptations from the Greek and Latin, especially from Horace and the Greek dramatists. During the latter years of his life his leisure was largely occupied in the composition of classical plays in English, cast in the Attic mould, drawn from scriptural and mythological themes. He had a good dramatic sense and a correct and fastidious ear. He refrained from publication, and confined the circulation of his plays and poems to a fit and cultured audience.

Pember married on 28 August 1861 Fanny, only daughter of William Richardson of Sydney, New South Wales, who survived him. His eldest and only surviving son, Francis William, became fellow of All Souls in 1884 and bursar in 1911.

== Works ==
The Maid of Messene and Other Poems (1855) *collection of verse; titular piece is a three act tragedy
