= Frederick Homes Dudden =

British theologian and academic administrator (1874–1955)

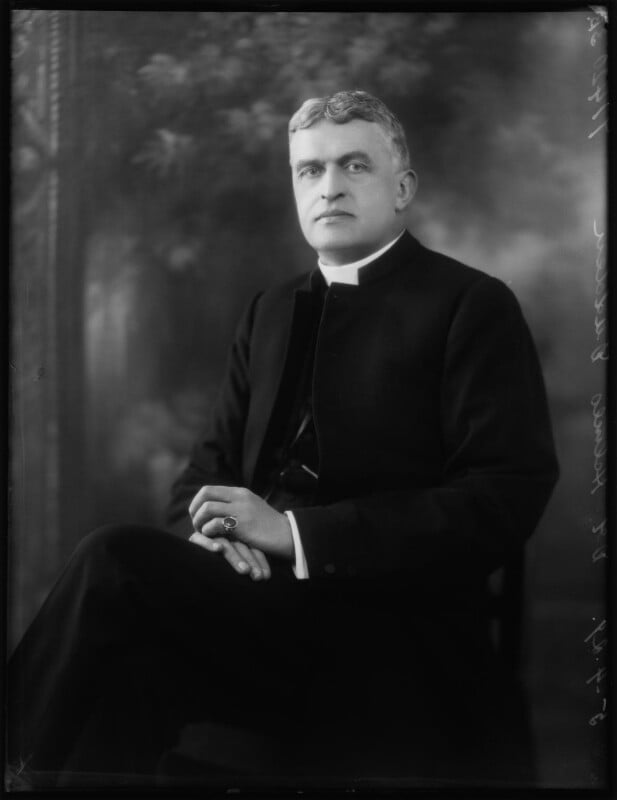
Dudden in 1929

Frederick Homes Dudden (1874–1955) was an academic administrator and theological scholar. He was Chaplain to King George V and George VI (1929–52), Master of Pembroke College, Oxford (1918–55) and Vice-Chancellor of Oxford University (1929–32).

== Education and career ==
Frederick Dudden was educated at Bath College and Pembroke College, Oxford. Dudden was Vicar of Holy Trinity Church in Sloane Street, central London. He was Fellow, Lecturer in Theology and Chaplain of Lincoln College, Oxford (1898–1914). He was Canon of Gloucester (1918–37). At Oxford University, he was a member of Hebdomadal Council (1924–45) and Pro-Vice-Chancellor (1925–29 and 1932–49), before and after his time as Vice-Chancellor.

Dudden wrote a two-volume biography of Henry Fielding, of which W. Somerset Maugham wrote: "I don't believe there is anything to be said about Henry Fielding that the eminent Master of Pembroke has left unsaid."

== Pembroke College ==
At Pembroke College, he was the first Master to live in the Lodgings. The previous Master's House was converted into undergraduate accommodation in 1928. He was a friend of Lord Nuffield, which led to the endowment of the Pembroke Mastership. This freed subsequent Masters of Pembroke from the financial need to take the position of Canon at Gloucester Cathedral, which had been given to the college by Queen Anne in 1714. As a representative of Pembroke College he was on the governing body of Abingdon School from 1921 to 1949.

== Publications ==
- Gregory the Great, his Place in History and Thought (2 vols), 1905
- In Christ's Name, 1908
- Christ and Christ's Religion, 1910
- The Future Life, 1915
- The Problem of Human Suffering and the War, 1916
- The Heroic Dead and other Sermons, 1917
- The Delayed Victory, 1918
- The Dead and the Living, and other Sermons, 1920
- The Life and Times of St Ambrose (2 vols), 1935
- Henry Fielding: His Life, Works, and Times (2 vols), 1953

Academic offices
Preceded by Bishop John Mitchinson	Master of Pembroke College, Oxford; 1918–1955	Succeeded by R. B. McCallum
Preceded by Francis William Pember	Vice-Chancellor of Oxford University; 1929–1932	Succeeded by Francis John Lys
