= John Sandsbury =

John Sandsbury or Sansbury (1576–1610) was an English cleric and Latin poet.

== Life ==
Sandsbury was admitted at Merchant Taylors' School in May 1587, and matriculated, aged 17, as scholar of St John's College, Oxford, 6 July 1593. In 1596 he was elected to one of the exhibitions given by St Paul's School for the support of poor scholars at the university. He graduated B.A. in 1597, M.A. in 1601, B.D. in 1608.

In 1607 Sandsbury became vicar of St Giles' Church, Oxford. He died in January 1610, and was buried in his church.

== Works ==
In 1608 Sandsbury published Latin hexameters, entitled Ilium in Italiam. Oxonia ad Protectionem Regis sui omnium optimi filia, pedisequa, Oxford. The dedication to James I shows that the poems were written in 1606. Each page contains the arms of one of the colleges, and beneath are nine hexameters giving an explanation of them, and containing a compliment to the king. He also wrote verses in the university collection on the death of Elizabeth, and Latin tragedies, which were performed by the scholars of the college at Christmas.

For Matthew Gwinne's play Nero, Sandsbury wrote a Latin commendatory poem, dedicated to Justus Lipsius. He claimed superiority of Gwinne's work, in relation to the classical Octavia, and the works by Theodor Beza, George Buchanan and William Gager.
