= Christopher Hargreaves =

16th century Oxford college head

Christopher Hargreaves was an Oxford college head in the 16th-century.

Hargreaves was Proctor in 1554; and Rector of Lincoln College, Oxford, from 1555 until his death on 15 October 1558. He was buried at All Saints Church, Oxford.
