= Henry Cuffe =

English author and politician

- Born: 1563
- Died: 13 March 1601 (aged 37–38)
- Cause of death: Execution

Sir Henry Cuffe (1563 – 13 March 1601) was an English writer and politician, executed during the reign of Queen Elizabeth I of England, for treason.

== Biography ==
=== Family connections ===
Born in 1563 at Hinton St George, Somerset, he was the youngest son of Robert Cuffe of Donyatt in that county. Of the same family, although the relationship does not seem to have been definitely settled, was Hugh Cuffe, who in 1598 was granted large estates in the county of Cork, and whose grandson Maurice wrote an account of the defence of Ballyalley Castle, County Clare, when besieged in the rebellion of 1641. Maurice Cuffe's journal was printed by the Camden Society in 1841, and the writer's grandnephew John was created Baron Desart in the Irish peerage in 1733 (the first baron's grandson, Otway Cuffe, became viscount in 1781, and Earl of Desart in 1793, and these titles are still extant). To another branch of the Somerset family of Cuffe belonged Thomas Cuffe of Crych, who went to Ireland in 1641, and whose son James was knighted by Charles II and granted land in Mayo and Galway. In 1797 James Cuffe (d. 1821), in direct line of descent from this Sir James Cuffe, was made Baron Tyrawley of Ballinrobe, County Mayo.

=== Early life ===
After receiving his early education at the grammar school of Hinton St. George, Henry Cuffe was elected at the age of fifteen a scholar of Trinity College, Oxford (25 May 1578) by the interest of Lady Elizabeth Powlett of Hinton, who always showed a kindly regard for his welfare. At Oxford, Cuffe exhibited a conspicuous ability, and became a finished Greek scholar. He attracted the attention of Sir Henry Savile, who aided him in his studies, and about 1582 made the acquaintance of John Hotman, a learned French Protestant in the service of the Earl of Leicester. In 1582 and 1583 he corresponded regularly with Hotman, and some of these letters, which prove strong affection between the writers, are printed in 'Francisci et Joannis Hotomanxorum...Epistolae' (Amsterdam, 1700). Cuffe proceeded B.A. 13 June 1580, and was elected fellow of his college 30 May 1583, but a severe remark about the practical jokes which the founder of Trinity, Sir Thomas Pope, was fond of playing on his friends, led to his expulsion from the college. In 1586, Sir Henry Savile offered him a tutorship at Merton, and there Cuffe pursued his Greek studies with conspicuous success. On 20 Feb 1588/9 he graduated M.A., and after proving his capacity as a teacher of Greek by holding a lectureship at Queen's College, he was in 1590 elected Regius Professor of Greek in the university. This post he held for seven years. He addressed the queen in a Latin speech at Carfax when she visited Oxford in 1592, and was chosen Junior Proctor 15 April 1594. Very soon afterwards Cuffe abandoned Oxford for London, where he obtained the post of secretary to the Earl of Essex.

=== With Essex ===
Essex employed a number of educated men, who were chiefly engaged in a voluminous foreign correspondence. At the time that Cuffe entered his service, Edward Reynolds, Sir Henry Wotton, Anthony Bacon, and Temple were already members of Essex's household, and the newcomer was described as a "great philosopher" who could "suit the wise observations of ancient authors to the transactions of modern times." He accompanied Essex in the expedition to Cádiz in 1596, and wrote an account of it on his return for publication, but this was prohibited by order of the queen and her council. Anthony Bacon, to whom Cuffe confided the manuscript, succeeded, however, in distributing a few copies. On Essex's acceptance of the lord-lieutenancy of Ireland, Cuffe sailed to Dublin in the earl's company in April 1599. In the following August he visited London to deliver to the queen those important dispatches in which Essex excused himself for his delay in suppressing Tyrone's Rebellion. "Mr Cuffe," wrote Rowland White to Sir Robert Sidney (12 September 1599), "hath had access to the queen, who came of purpose marvelously well instructed to answer such objections as her majesty could lay to his [i.e. Essex's] charge, and I hear that Cuffe hath wisely behaved himself to her majesty's better satisfaction" (Sidney Papers). But the royal letter which Cuffe carried back to Essex was not conciliatory, and on 28 September, Cuffe accompanied his master on his sudden visit to London which ended in Essex's imprisonment. During the latter months of the earl's confinement Cuffe appears to have been in continual intercourse with him, and after his release (26 August 1600) definitely re-entered his service. He was deeply interested in Essex's reinstatement at court, both on grounds of personal ambition and of affection for his employer, and, now that few friends had access to the earl, was much in his confidence.

=== Rebellion ===
For a man of Essex's temperament he was the worst possible counsellor. He urged him to seek at all hazards an interview with the queen, and argued that Elizabeth would be unable to withhold her favour from him after she had heard from his mouth the story of his grievances and of the animosity with which the Cecils, Raleigh, and others regarded him. He deprecated all compromise with those he regarded as the earl's enemies; taunted Essex with having already submitted voluntarily to many degradations; advised Essex's friends to form an alliance with all political malcontents to make themselves a party to be feared; laid his plans before Sir Henry Neville, who had just been recalled from the French embassy and had grievances against the government; and obtained Essex's consent to communicate with his old friend Sir Charles Danvers. Cuffe had no clear ideas as to the details of his policy, and did not take part in the secret meetings of Essex's friends, whom he had helped to bring together, at Drury House, in November and December 1600. Meanwhile, some of Essex's relatives perceived the evil effect on Essex of Cuffe's maladroit counsels, and they induced him in November to dismiss him from his service. Sir Gilly Merrick, Essex's steward, was ordered to remove him from Essex House. But Cuffe appealed to the good nature of his master's friend, the Earl of Southampton, who readily obtained from Essex a rescission of the order (see Wotton). Cuffe's work was, however, done. He opposed the appeal to force and took no part in the riot in the city of London on Sunday, 8 Feb 1600/1 (see Devereux, Robert, second Earl of Essex), but with Essex and all his allies was thrown into the Tower. When Essex, just before his execution, requested to be confronted with Cuffe in the Tower (21 Feb 1600/1) in the presence of witnesses, he used the words: 'You have been one of the chiefest instigators of me to all these my disloyal courses into which I have fallen.'

=== Trial and execution ===
At the end of February Cuffe answered several questions respecting Essex's negotiations with King James of Scotland which the lords of the council put to him. He appears to have told the truth, but his replies show that he had not managed that part of Essex's correspondence, which was mainly in the hands of Anthony Bacon. Some days before his execution, however, he wrote to Sir Robert Cecil enclosing a copy of instructions which Essex had prepared for presentation to the Earl of Mar, an ambassador to Elizabeth from James, with the object of so poisoning Mar's mind against Cecil and his friends that Mar might communicate suspicion of them to the queen. On 2 March 1600/1 Cuffe was twice re-examined, and explained his negotiation with Sir Henry Neville. Three days later he was put on his trial, with Sir Christopher Blount, Sir Charles Danvers, Sir John Davis, and Sir Gilly Merrick. Cuffe and Merrick were not indicted, like the rest, for open acts of violence. Coke, the attorney-general and prosecuting counsel, denounced Cuffe in the strongest terms, and began his address to the court with the remark that he 'was the arrantest traitor that ever came to that bar,' 'the very seducer of the earl,' and 'the cunning coiner of all plots.' Cuffe replied that he had wished to see his master recalled to the queen's favour, but that was the limit of his desire and action. On the day of the rebellion he never left Essex House. Coke thereupon said that he would give him 'a cuff that should set him down,' and read extracts from Essex's and Sir Henry Neville's confessions. Sir Charles Danvers' confession was also put in, and it was stated that, in case of the plot succeeding, Cuffe had been promised the speakership in the next parliament. The jury returned a verdict of guilty against all the prisoners. Cuffe asked for the companionship of a divine before he was executed. On 13 March Merrick and Cuffe were drawn to Tyburn. Cuffe began a speech admitting his guilt while denying many of the charges brought against him. The authorities twice interrupted him, and on the second occasion he 'began to apply himself to his devotions, which he managed with a great deal of fervor,' and was 'dispatched by the executioner' (State Trials, i. 1410–1451). Bacon in the official 'Declaration of the Treasons,' 1601, describes Cuffe as 'a base fellow by birth, but a great scholar, and indeed a noble traitor by the book, being otherwise of a turbulent and mutinous spirit against all superiors.' Francis Osborn, in his 'Advice to a Son,' illustrates by Cuffe's career his warning 'Mingle not your interest with a great one's.'

== Works ==
In 1607 an editor who signed himself R.M. dedicated to Robert, lord Willoughby and Eresby, a short philosophical and scientific tract by Cuffe. Cuffe here shows wide reading in the writings of the Greek philosophers; a belief in astrology, and faith in a divine providence. In Cott. MS. Nero D. x. is 'De Rebus Gestis in sancto concilio Nicaeno,' a translation attributed to Cuffe from the Greek of Gelasius Cyzicenus. In Harl. MS. 1327, fol. 58, are to be found Aphorismes Political, gathered out of the Life and End of that most noble Robert Devereux, Earle of Essex, not long before his death, a work which is also ascribed to Cuffe. Cuffe assisted Columbanus in his edition (p. 2, Florence, 1598) of Longus's Pastoral of Daphnis and Chloe, and contributed six Greek elegiacs to William Camden's Britannia.
