= Francis William Pember =

English cricketer, lawyer and academic

Francis Pember
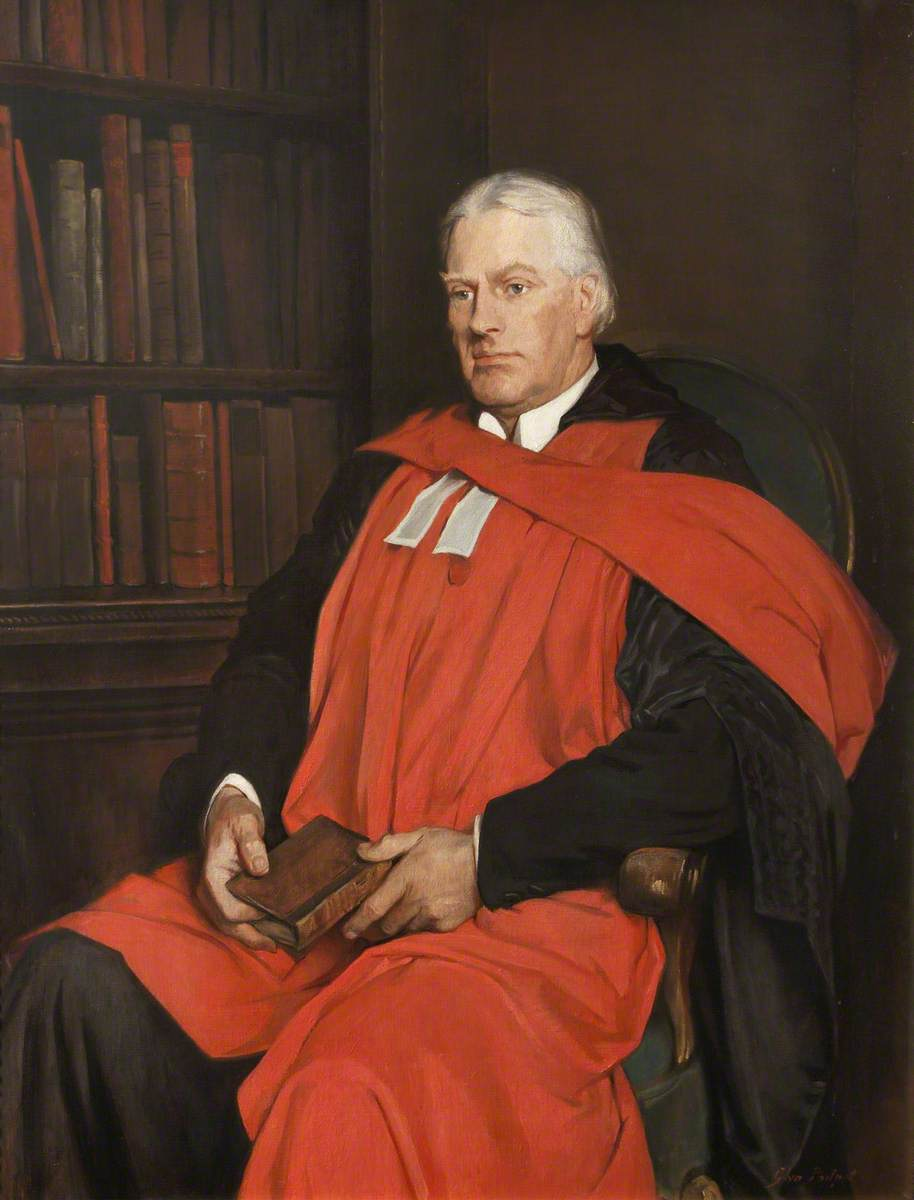
- Francis William Pember, by Glyn Philpot

Personal information
- Full name: Francis William Pember
- Born: 16 August 1862; Hatfield, Hertfordshire, England
- Died: 19 January 1954 (aged 91); Newnham, Cambridgeshire, England
- Batting: Right-handed

Domestic team information
- Years: Team
- 1882–1885: Marylebone Cricket Club
- 1885: Hampshire

Career statistics
Competition	First-class
Matches	5
Runs scored	112
Batting average	16.00
100s/50s	–/–
Top score	47*
Catches/stumpings	5/–
- Source: Cricinfo, 24 January 2010

Francis William Pember JP (16 August 1862 — 19 January 1954) was an English first-class cricketer, lawyer and an academic at the University of Oxford. Having been played first-class cricket for Hampshire and the Marylebone Cricket Club in his younger years, it was as an academic that Pember was best known. He was warden of All Souls College at Oxford for eighteen years, and would serve as Vice-Chancellor of the university in the late-1920s.

== Early life and cricket ==
The son of the judge Edward Henry Pember, he was born at Hatfield. He was educated at Harrow School, where he played for the school cricket team and was head of school in 1879. From Harrow, he matriculated in October 1880 to Balliol College, Oxford. While studying at Oxford, he made his debut in first-class cricket for the Marylebone Cricket Club (MCC) against Hampshire at Southampton in 1882. Although he did not play at first-class level for Oxford University Cricket Club, he did play for the MCC against the club in first-class fixtures in 1883 and 1885. He also made two first-class appearances for Hampshire in 1885, against Surrey and Derbyshire; he qualified for play for Hampshire through residency, having lived at Vicar's Hill near Lymington. In five first-class matches, Pember scored 112 runs at an average of exactly 16, with a highest score of 47 not out.

== Legal and academic careers ==
Pember was elected a law fellow of All Souls College, Oxford, in 1884. After graduating from Balliol in 1885, he became a student of Lincoln's Inn. Following the completion of his master's degree in 1887, he was called to the bar to practice as a barrister in 1889. In law, Pember practised as an equity and Parliamentary draftsman, and as a conveyancer. He occasionally served as a legal adviser and temporary assistant at the Foreign Office. In 1895, he married The Hon. Margaret Bowen Davey, daughter of Horace Davey, Baron Davey; their daughter, Katharine, would marry Charles Galton Darwin in 1925. In 1910, he was elected estates bursar at All Souls, and following the death of Sir William Anson in 1914, he was elected warden of All Souls, a position he held until 1932. He was credited with leading All Souls, the only Oxford graduate college, to adapt to the changed conditions and needs of Oxford following the First World War, with Pember overseeing the drawing up of the new statutes of All Souls in accordance with the recommendations of the Universities Commission. During his wardenship, he bought Broncroft Castle in Shropshire, which he renovated.

Pember was elected Vice-Chancellor of Oxford University in 1926, succeeding Joseph Wells. He was Vice-Chancellor until 1929, serving the final year of his Vice-Chancellorship alongside his friend, Lord Grey of Fallodon, who had been elected Chancellor in 1928. Amongst the issues he faced while Vice-Chancellor were discussions about the future of the Bodleian Library. Outside of Oxford, he maintained a connection with Harrow School, serving as its chairman of governors from 1910 to 1944. He was appointed an Officier of the Legion of Honour by the French. Following the death of his wife in 1942, Pember's health began to fail him. As a result, he sold Broncroft Castle and moved to live with his daughter in Newnham, Cambridgeshire. He died there in January 1954 and was cremated at Cambridge Crematorium on 24 January 1954.

Academic offices
Preceded by Sir William Reynell Anson	Warden of All Souls College, Oxford; 1914–1932	Succeeded by Frederick John Napier Thesiger, Viscount Chelmsford
Preceded by Joseph Wells	Vice-Chancellor of Oxford University; 1926–1929	Succeeded by Frederick Homes Dudden
