= Geoffrey Symeon =

Canon of Windsor

Geoffrey Symeon (also Simeon and Symson) S.T.P. (d. 21 August 1508) was a Canon of Windsor from 1501 to 1508 and Dean of Chichester from 1504 to 1508.

== Career ==
He was educated at New College, Oxford.

He was appointed:

- Senior Proctor of University of Oxford elected by New College, Oxford, 1478–1479
- Dean of the Chapel Royal
- Prebendary of Somerley in Chichester Cathedral, 1480
- Prebendary of Holywell in St Paul's Cathedral, 1494
- Rector of Wheathampstead, Hertfordshire
- Dean of Chichester, 1504
- Dean of Lincoln, 1506
- Vicar of Colerne, Wiltshire

He was appointed to the third stall in St George's Chapel, Windsor Castle in 1501, a position he held until 1508.

He was buried in the Charterhouse, London.
