= John Freind (physician) =

English physician (1675–1728)

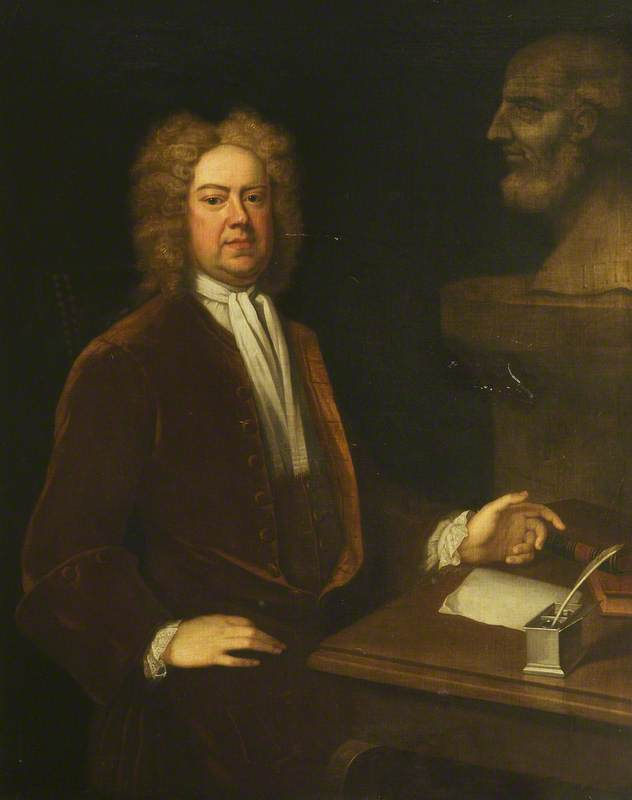
John Freind, painting by Michael Dahl.

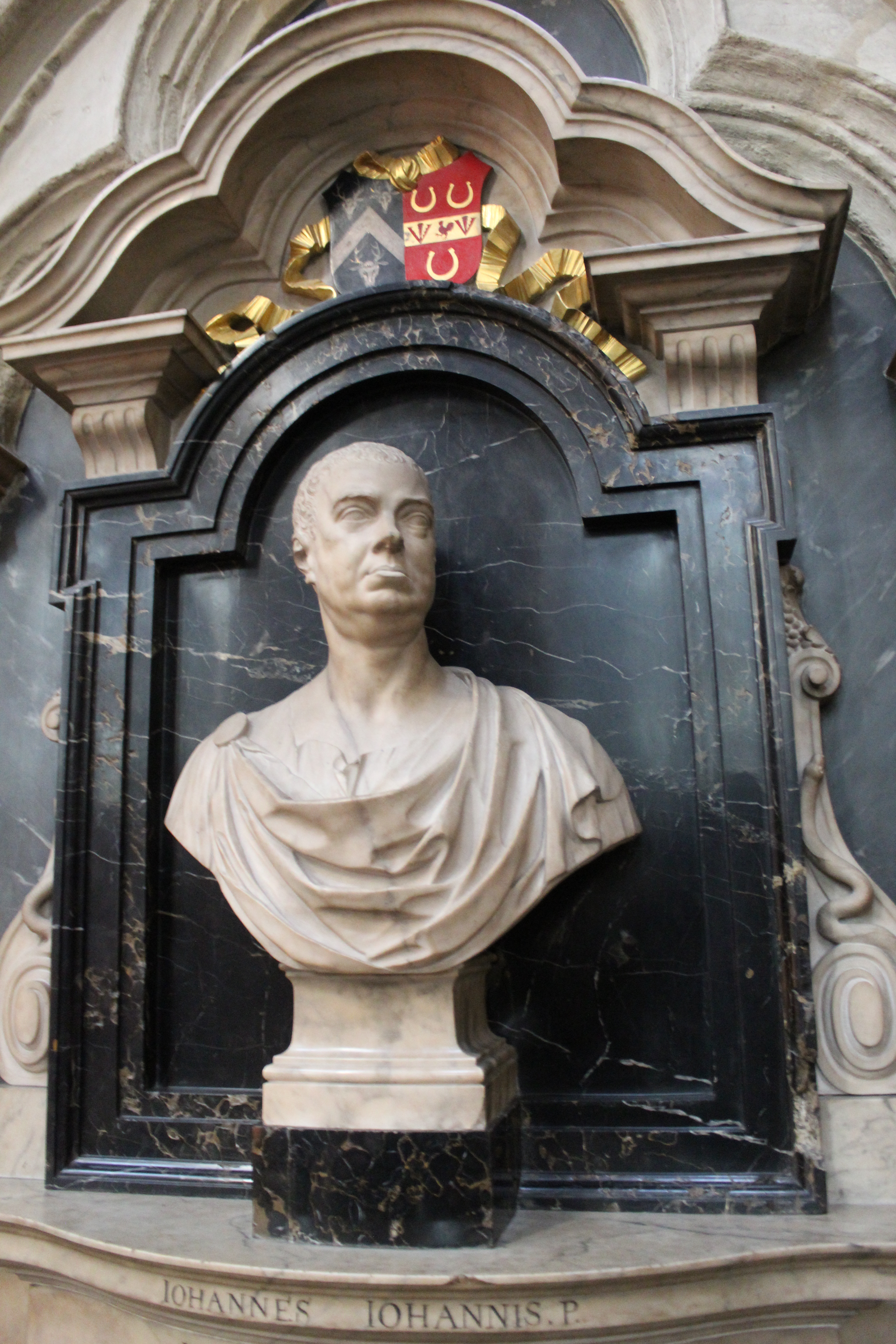
Bust of Freind, Westminster Abbey

John Freind FRS (1675 – 26 July 1728) was an English physician.

== Life ==
Freind was younger brother of Robert Freind (1667–1751), headmaster of Westminster School, and was born at Croughton, Northamptonshire. He was under Richard Busby at Westminster School, and studied at Christ Church, Oxford under Henry Aldrich.

After this Freind began the study of medicine, and having proved his scientific attainments by various treatises was appointed a lecturer on chemistry at Oxford in 1704. In the following year he accompanied the English army, under Charles Mordaunt, 3rd Earl of Peterborough, into Spain. Shortly after his return in 1713 from Flanders, where he had accompanied British troops, he took up residence in London, where he soon obtained a reputation as a physician.

In 1716 Freind became a fellow of the Royal College of Physicians, delivered the Goulstonian Lectures in 1717, was chosen one of the censors in 1718 and Harveian orator in 1720. In 1722 he entered the House of Commons as Member of Parliament (MP) for Launceston in Cornwall; but, being suspected of favoring the cause of the exiled Stuarts, he spent half of that year in the Tower of London. In 1726 Freind was appointed physician to Queen Caroline, an office which he held until his death.

Freind had purchased the manor of Hitcham in Berkshire and is buried there. There is a memorial to him in Westminster Abbey by the architect James Gibbs and the sculptor John Michael Rysbrack.

== Works ==
While still very young, he produced with Peter Foulkes an edition of the speeches of Aeschines and Demosthenes on the affair of Ctesiphon. On returning home in 1707, he wrote an account of the expedition to Spain, which attained great popularity. In 1709 he published his Prelectiones chimicae, which he dedicated to Sir Isaac Newton.

During his imprisonment he conceived his major work, The History of Physic, of which the first part appeared in 1725, and the second in the following year. Included in this volume was a paper by Dr. Henry Levett, also written in Latin, addressing the treatment of smallpox.

A complete edition of his Latin works, with a Latin translation of the History of Physic, edited by John Wigan, was published in London in 1732.

Parliament of Great Britain
| Preceded by John Anstis and Alexander Pendarves | Member of Parliament for Launceston; 1722–1724; With: Alexander Pendarves | Succeeded by John Willes and Alexander Pendarves |
| Preceded by Alexander Pendarves and John Willes | Member of Parliament for Launceston; 1725–1727; With: John Willes, to 1726; Henry Vane, 1726–1727 | Succeeded by John King and Arthur Tremayne |
