= Richard Mayew =

English academic, bishop and diplomat

Richard Mayew (1439/40–1516), also written Mayo, was an English academic, who became Bishop of Hereford (1504 to 1516) and a diplomat for Henry VII of England.

== Biography ==
Mayew was born in Hungerford, Berkshire, England. He was President of Magdalen College, Oxford, from 1480 to 1507; previously he had been a Fellow of New College, Oxford, and was brought in by William Waynflete. He was Vice-Chancellor of the University of Oxford in 1484–5, and Chancellor of the University of Oxford in 1502.

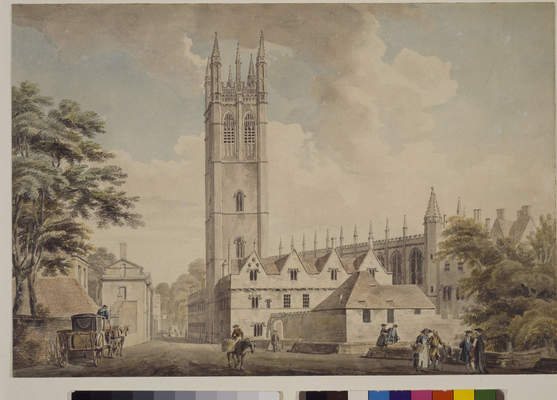
18th-century view of Magdalen Tower

He laid the foundation stone of Magdalen Tower on 9 August 1492. The tower was completed in 1509, by which time he had left Oxford.

He was collated Archdeacon of Oxford in 1493 and Archdeacon of the East Riding in 1501 and was elevated to the bishopric of Hereford and the position of Lord Almoner in 1504. In 1501, he was one of the party who brought Catherine of Aragon from Spain for her marriage to Prince Arthur, a mission commemorated in tapestries.

Mayew was buried at Hereford Cathedral.

Academic offices
Preceded by William Tybard	President of Magdalen College, Oxford; 1480–1507	Succeeded by John Claymond
Preceded by Robert Wrangwais, William Sutton	Vice-Chancellor of the University of Oxford; 1484–1485	Succeeded by John Taylor
Preceded by William Smyth	Chancellor of the University of Oxford; 1502–1506	Succeeded by William Warham
Catholic Church titles
Preceded by Adriano Castellesi	Bishop of Hereford; 1504–1516	Succeeded by Charles Booth
