= Richard Latewar =

Richard Latewar (1560–1601) was an English churchman and academic, known as a Neo-Latin poet.

== Life ==
Latewar was the son of Thomas Latewar of London, and in 1571 was sent to Merchant Taylors' School. He was elected scholar of St John's College, Oxford, in 1580, and in due course became fellow. He was admitted B.A. 28 November 1584, M.A. 23 May 1588, B.D. 2 July 1594, and D.D. 5 February 1597.

In 1593 Latewar was proctor, at which time he was rector of Hopton, Suffolk. In 1596 he was recommended by the university of Oxford as one of the candidates for the first Gresham professorship of divinity. On 28 June 1599 he was appointed rector of Finchley, Middlesex,

As chaplain to Charles Blount, 8th Baron Mountjoy, Latewar accompanied Blount on his expedition to Ireland. He died on 17 July 1601, from a wound received at Benburb, County Tyrone, on the previous day, and was buried in the church at Armagh.

== Monument ==
A monument was erected to Latewar's memory in St John's College chapel by his father; the date of his death is incorrectly given as 27 July. Nicholas Amhurst, in his Terræ Filius (p. 185), alleges that on the monument there were these lines:

A sero bello dives durusque vocatus,
A sero bello nomen et omen habet.

They are not there now. The actual inscription is given in Anthony Wood's History and Antiquities of the University of Oxford, (p. 566, 1786 edition). It has been attributed, on internal evidence, to Matthew Gwinne.

== Works ==
Latewar was a famous preacher, and a Latin poet. John Stow refers to his poetic gifts. Samuel Daniel speaks of him as his friend, and in the "Apology" to his Philotas mentions that Latewar told him that he himself "had written the same argument and caused it to be presented in St. John's College, Oxon., where, as I afterwards heard, it was worthily and with great applause performed."

Latewar contributed verses to the Oxford Exequi on Sir Philip Sidney, as well as to some other books. He also wrote:

- Carmen apomnēmoneutikon, Coll. S. Johan. Bapt., which was restored and augmented by Richard Andrews, a later fellow of the college.
- Concio Latina ad Academicos Oxon, 1594, a sermon on Philippians iii. 1, preached on his admission to his B.D., and printed in 1594 with his apology in Latin.

A letter from Latewar to Robert Bruce Cotton is preserved in Cotton. MS. Julius C. iii. f. 231. An epitaph on him is contained in the Affaniæ of Charles Fitzgeffrey.
