= Matthew Gwinne =

English physician

Matthew Gwinne (16 May 1558 – 1627) was an English physician.

== Life ==
Gwinne was born in London on 16 May 1558. He was of Welsh descent, a son of Edward Gwinne, grocer. On 28 April 1570 he entered Merchant Taylors' School. He was elected to a scholarship at St John's College, Oxford, in 1574, and afterwards became a fellow there. He proceeded B.A. 14 May 1578, and M.A. 4 May 1582. In 1582, as a regent master, he read lectures in music, but on 19 February 1583 he was allowed to discontinue the lecture. In 1588 he was junior proctor.

Queen Elizabeth visited Oxford in September 1592, and he took part as replier in moral philosophy in an academic disputation held for her amusement, defending the Moderns against the Ancients and being cut short by the proctors; and at the same time was appointed to provide for plays in Christ Church. He took the degree of M.B. 17 July 1593, and was the same day created M.D., on the recommendation of Lord Buckhurst, chancellor of the university; one of his quaestiones on this occasion was "whether the frequent use of tobacco was beneficial".

In 1595 Gwinne went to France in attendance on Sir Henry Unton, the ambassador. When Gresham College was founded in London, Gwinne was nominated by the university of Oxford on 14 February 1597 the first Gresham Professor of Physic, and began to lecture in Michaelmas term 1598. He was admitted a licentiate of the College of Physicians of London 30 September 1600, and a fellow 22 December 1605. He was six times censor, and twice held the office of registrar. In 1605 he was given the appointment of physician to the Tower. When in 1605 James I and Queen Anne of Denmark visited Oxford, Gwinne disputed on physic with Sir William Paddy for the royal entertainment, on the questions whether the morals of nurses are imbibed by infants with their milk, and whether smoking tobacco is wholesome. The same evening at Magdalen College a play by Gwinne, entitled Vertumnus sive annus recurrens, was acted by students of his own college, St John's, and pleased the king, although it did not keep him awake.

Gwinne resigned his Gresham professorship in 1607, and attained large professional practice. In 1620 Gwinne was appointed commissioner for inspecting tobacco. Gwinne lived in the parish of St Mary Magdalen Old Fish Street, London, and there died in October 1627.

Matthew and his wife Susanna left two sons, John and Henry, who both appear to have been ministers.

== Works ==
The Gresham inaugural oration, with another, was published in 1605: Orationes duae, Londini habitae in sedibus Greshamiis in laudem Dei, Civitatis, Fundatoris, Electorum. Like all his Latin prose compositions these orations are crowded with quotations. Vertumnus sive annus recurrens was printed in London in 1607, with a preface praising the king, and with prefatory verses to Gwinne by Sir William Paddy and John Craig, the royal physicians.

In 1611 was published his only medical work, against Francis Anthony. Gwinne proves that Anthony's aurum potabile contained no gold, and that if it had, the virtues of gold as a medicine in no way corresponded to its value as a metal, and were few, if any. It is written in the form of a Latin dialogue between Anthony and his opponent; prefixed to were laudatory verses from the physicians Paddy, Craig, Forster, Fryer, and Hammond. Allen Debus considers that this work shows knowledge of the Paracelsian as well as the Galenist literature, and that the polemic, from the conservative angle, also shows some discrimination amongst different kinds of chemists in the medical field.

He was friendly with literary men, especially with John Florio, to whose works he contributed several commendatory sonnets under the pseudonym of "Il Candido". Gwinne also had significant connections to the circle of Sir Philip Sidney, and collaborated with Fulke Greville on the 1590 edition of the Arcadia. The links include sight of Sidney's now-lost translations from Guillaume de Salluste Du Bartas. In the second dialogue of Giordano Bruno's La Cena de le Ceneri (1584) Gwinne and Florio are represented by Bruno as introducing him to Greville, at whose house the three dined before holding a philosophical disputation.

Gwinne wrote also:

- Epicedium in obitum &c. Henrici comitis Derbiensis, Oxford, 1593.
- Nero, London, 1603, and a second edition, 1637 and 1639, a tragedy in Latin verse written at St John's College, Oxford (unconnected with the two English tragedies of Nero, published in 1607 and 1624 by unknown authors). There was a dedicatory Latin poem by John Sandsbury. Nero was never acted, because of "the multitude of roles, the unequal length of the Act, and the implausibility of producing such an intractable piece."
- Vertumnus, 1607
- Oratio in laudem Musices, first published in The Lives of the Professors of Gresham College (1740) by John Ward.
- Memorial inscriptions in St John's College Chapel to John Case, Richard Latewar (attributed on internal evidence), and John Wicksteed.

== Notes ==
Attribution

- This article incorporates text from a publication now in the public domain: Stephen, Leslie; Lee, Sidney, eds. (1890). "Gwinne, Matthew". Dictionary of National Biography. Vol. 23. London: Smith, Elder & Co.
