= R. B. McCallum =

British historian (1898–1973)

Ronald Buchanan McCallum (28 August 1898 in Paisley, Renfrewshire – 18 May 1973 in Letcombe Regis, Berkshire) was a British historian. He was a fellow (and later Master) of Pembroke College, Oxford, where he taught modern history and politics and was a member of J. R. R. Tolkien's Inklings. McCallum helped popularize the term psephology (statistical analysis of elections).

== Early life and education ==
The fourth and youngest son of Andrew Fisher McCallum, a master dyer, and his wife, Catherine Buchanan Gibson, he was educated at Paisley Grammar School and Trinity College, Glenalmond. During the First World War, he served for two years between 1917 and 1919 as a member of the Labour Corps of the British Expeditionary Force in France.

Returning to Britain, he obtained a place at Worcester College, Oxford, where he read history and took his degree with first class honours in 1922.

== Academic career ==
After spending a year at Princeton University in 1922 and 1923, he became lecturer in history at Glasgow University. In 1925, Pembroke College, Oxford, elected him a fellow and tutor in history and was a member of the Senior Common Room with R. G. Collingwood and J. R. R. Tolkien. He was a tutor for several generations of undergraduates in British history and political institutions, including an influential seminar on British parliamentary procedure. One of his most famous pupils was the Rhodes Scholar and future American Senator J. William Fulbright. Elected to several college offices over the next thirty years, he became Master of Pembroke College in 1955.

He was the first non-clerical head of the College since 1714. In addition, he held university offices, including serving as Senior Proctor in 1942 and 1943 and Pro-Vice Chancellor in 1961 as well as the university member of the Oxford City Council, 1958–1967. McCallum served as editor of The Oxford Magazine for three terms, 1933, 1967, and 1972.

His 1944 work, Public Opinion and the Last Peace, is an analysis of the relationship between public opinion and policy in regards to the making of the Treaty of Versailles and its revision during the Interwar years. McCallum defended David Lloyd George against those who had attacked him for his conduct during the 1918 election and for his policies at the Paris Peace Conference. He also defended the Versailles Treaty against the criticism of John Maynard Keynes in The Economic Consequences of the Peace. Max Beloff called Public Opinion and the Last Peace "scholarly and penetrating", adding that it was "one of the most important, as it is certainly one of the most brilliant and courageous, contributions to the literature of the subject".

As Master of Pembroke, he oversaw a transformation of the college that reflected the changes established by the Butler Education Act of 1944. In his tenure, the number of fellows increased and began to include natural scientists. He created the college's north quadrangle in 1962 by converting a row of historic houses between Pembroke Street and Beef Lane. In 1967, he resigned the mastership of Pembroke to become principal of what, the following year, was named the King George VI and Queen Elizabeth Foundation of St Catharines housed at Cumberland Lodge, Windsor Great Park. He retained the post until 1971. He was on the governing body of Abingdon School from 1950 to 1973. While in Oxford, McCallum was an irregular attender of the Inklings, an informal literary discussion group associated with the University of Oxford and attended by C. S. Lewis and J. R. R. Tolkien, which met for nearly two decades between the early 1930s and late 1949.

McCallum is widely remembered for his work as a historian and analyst of British public opinion. The professor coined the word psephology to describe the academic study of elections, but in this retained his focus as a historian and did not venture into sociological approaches.

== Books ==
- Asquith (biography, 1936). Great Lives Series.
- England and France, 1939-1943 (1944). online
- Public Opinion and the Last Peace (1944).
- The British General Election of 1945 (1947). With Alison Readman.
- The Liberal Party from Earl Grey to Asquith (1963). Men and Ideas Series.

Academic offices
Preceded by Frederick Homes Dudden	Master of Pembroke College, Oxford; 1955 to 1967	Succeeded by Sir George Pickering
