= John Stenning =

English scholar, academic administrator and army officer

John Stenning CB CBE
- Born: John Frederick Stenning; 14 February 1868; Beckenham, Kent, England
- Died: 18 November 1959 (aged 91); Oxford, Oxfordshire, England
- Citizenship: United Kingdom
- Spouse: Ethelwyn
- Children: Two

Academic work
- Discipline: Biblical and Semitic studies
- Sub-discipline: Aramaic; Old Testament; Syriac
- Institutions: Magdalen College, Oxford; Wadham College, Oxford; University of Oxford

John Frederick Stenning, CB, CBE (14 February 1868 – 18 November 1959) was an English Biblical and Semitic scholar, academic administrator, and British Army officer. Elected a Fellow of Wadham College, Oxford in 1898, he was Reader in Aramaic at the University of Oxford from 1909 to 1927 and Warden of Wadham College from 1927 to 1939. Outside of academia, he was a lieutenant colonel in the British Army, and served as commanding officer of Oxford's Officers' Training Corps and also of an Officer Cadet Battalion during the First World War.

== Early life and education ==
Stenning was born on 14 February 1868 in Beckenham, Kent, England. He was educated at Merchant Taylors' School, an all-boys public school then in London. In 1886, he matriculated into Wadham College, Oxford as a Hody exhibitioner. Having studied theology, he achieved second class honours in 1889. He continued his undergraduate studies in Oriental languages, specialising in Hebrew and Aramaic, achieving first class honours in 1891. He graduated from the University of Oxford with a Bachelor of Arts (BA) degree in 1889, and a Master of Arts (MA) degree in 1893.

== Career ==
=== Academic career ===
From 1893 to 1897, Stenning was a Senior Demy of Magdalen College, Oxford. In 1894, he visited the Near East alongside his friend Arthur Cowley (later Bodley's Librarian). The aim of this trip was to study the Semitic manuscripts held in monasteries, particularly those at Saint Catherine's Monastery in the Sinai. In 1898, he returned to his alma mater Wadham College, Oxford having been elected a Fellow. He was also a lecturer in the Old Testament at the University of Oxford, before being appointed Reader in Aramaic in 1909. At college level, he served as dean, senior tutor, and bursar, before being elected Warden of Wadham College on 24 June 1927. With the additional administrative duties required from being the head of a college, his readership became honorary, although he did continue teaching. He stepped down as warden in 1938/1939 and Maurice Bowra was elected to succeed him.

=== Military service ===
Stenning served with the 1st (Oxford University) Volunteer Battalion, Oxfordshire Light Infantry: this battalion was part of the Volunteer Force, and as such his service would have been a part-time. He was promoted to lieutenant on 6 September 1905. He resigned his commission on 19 November 1907.

On 26 May 1909, he rejoined the British Army to serve with the newly created Oxford Officers' Training Corps (OTC), and was promoted to the rank of major. On 22 March 1912, he was promoted to lieutenant colonel, and took command of the Oxford OTC. From 1916 to 1918, he was also commanding officer of an Officer Cadet Battalion. These provided officer training to those who had served in the ranks or had been part of the OTC, before they were commissioned in the British Army. He relinquished his commission on 11 September 1919 and was allowed to retain his rank.

== Personal life ==
Stenning was married to Ethelwyn (née Alexander). Together they had one son and one daughter. His wife predeceased him, dying in 1957. Stenning died on 18 November 1959, aged 91.

== Honours ==
In the 1916 King's Birthday Honours, Stenning was appointed Companion of the Order of the Bath (CB) in recognition of service during the war. In the 1919 King's Birthday Honours, he was appointed Commander of the Order of the British Empire (CBE) for valuable services rendered in connection with the War.

Academic offices
Preceded by Joseph Wells	Warden of Wadham College, Oxford; 1927 to 1939	Succeeded by Maurice Bowra
