= Peter Foulkes =

Welsh churchman and academic

Peter Foulkes (1676–1747) was a Welsh churchman and academic.

== Life ==
He was the third son of Robert Foulkes of Llechryd, Denbighshire, deputy baron of the court of exchequer of Chester, by Jane Ameredith of Landulph, Cornwall. He was admitted king's scholar at Westminster School in 1690, and was elected thence to a Westminster studentship at Christ Church, Oxford in 1694. He took the degrees of B.A. in 1698, M.A. in 1701. He was chosen censor at Christ Church in 1703, in preference to Edmund Smith, the poet, and was junior proctor for 1705.

His cousin William Jane, who died in 1707, left him wealthy as residuary legatee and devisee of his property, which included land in Liskeard and Bodmin; consequently he was a grand compounder for the degrees of B.D. and D.D. in 1710. He was appointed canon of Exeter Cathedral in 1704, and became sub-dean in 1723, chancellor in May 1724, and precentor in 1731. At Christ Church he was made canon in November 1724, and was sub-dean from 1725 to 1733.

He was instituted rector of Cheriton Bishop, Devon, in 1714, and vicar of Thorverton in 1716. He died 30 April 1747, and was buried in Exeter Cathedral.

== Works ==
While an undergraduate he published, with John Freind and under Henry Aldrich's auspices, an edition of ‘Æschines against Ctesiphon and Demosthenes on the Crown,’ with a Latin translation (Oxford, 1696). He published a Latin poem in ‘Pietas Universitatis Oxoniensis in obitum augustissimæ et desideratissimæ Reginæ Mariæ,’ Oxford, 1695; another on the east window in Christ Church in ‘Musarum Anglicanarum Analecta,’ Oxford, 1699, ii. 180; another (No. 15) in ‘Pietas Universitatis Oxoniensis in obitum serenissimi Regis Georgii I et gratulatio in augustissimi Regis Georgii II inaugurationem,’ Oxford, 1727. Also ‘A Sermon preached in the Cathedral Church of Exeter, Jan. 30, 1723, being the day of the martyrdom of King Charles I,’ Exeter, 1723.

== Family ==
He married first in 1707 Elizabeth Bidgood of Rockbeare, Devon, who died in 1737; and secondly, on 26 December 1738, Anne, widow of William Holwell, and daughter of Offspring Blackall, bishop of Exeter. Andrew Davy of Medland, Cheriton Bishop, who died in 1722, left him the manor of Medland and other lands in trust for his second son, William Foulkes.
