= Simon Horobin =

British philologist and author (born 1972)

- Born: 22 September 1972 (age 53)
- Occupations: Philologist; author
- Writing career
- Language: English
- Subject: Linguistics

Simon Horobin (born 22 September 1972) is a British philologist and author.

== Life and career ==
Horobin graduated from the University of Sheffield. He is a professor of English language and literature at the University of Oxford and a fellow of Magdalen College. In 2020–21, Horobin served as senior proctor at the University of Oxford. In 2024, he was appointed head of the faculty of English. Prior to joining Magdalen in 2006, Horobin was a reader in English language at the University of Glasgow.

He has been a visiting professor at the University of Connecticut, Harvard University, and Charles University. He has also acted as honorary secretary for the Society for the Study of Medieval Languages and Literature.

Horobin has appeared on several radio and television programmes to discuss linguistic issues and has been interviewed for various articles in numerous national papers. He was elected a fellow of the English Association in 2020.

== Selected publications ==
=== Books ===
- The Language of the Chaucer Tradition – D.S. Brewer, 2003
- Chaucer's Language – Palgrave Macmillan, 2006; 3rd edition, Bloomsbury, 2025
- Studying the History of Early English – Palgrave Macmillan, 2009
- Does Spelling Matter? – Oxford University Press, 2013
- How English Became English: A Short History of a Global Language – Oxford University Press, 2016
- The English Language: A Very Short Introduction (Very Short Introductions), 2018
- Bagels, Bumf, and Buses: A Day in the Life of the English Language – Oxford University Press, 2019

=== Articles ===
- "Spelling It Out: Is It Time English Speakers Loosened Up"? (2014)
- "So Trump Makes Spelling Errors. In the Twitter Age, Whoo Doesn't"? (2017)
- "The True Importance of Good Spelling." (2017)
- "Trump's Covfefe Takes Hold in the Land of the Spelling Bee."
- Horobin, Simon (1 July 2024). "Identifying Scribal Hands: Principles and Problems". Speculum. 99 (3): 688–696. doi:10.1086/730563.
