= Martin Maiden (microbiologist) =

University academic and researcher

Professor Martin Maiden FMedSci FRCPath FRSB
- Born: Martin Christopher James Maiden
- Education: University of Reading
- Known for: Multilocus sequence typing
- Awards: Fellow of the Academy of Medical Sciences (2016)
- Scientific career
- Fields: Microbiology
- Thesis: Arabinose-proton symport in escherichia coli (1986)
- Academic advisors: Peter Henderson

Martin Christopher James Maiden is an English microbiologist. He is Head of Department and Professor of Molecular Epidemiology in the Department of Biology at the University of Oxford, where he is also a fellow of Hertford College. He was elected a Fellow of the Royal College of Pathologists in 2010, a Fellow of the Society of Biology in 2012, and a Fellow of the Academy of Medical Sciences and the American Academy of Microbiology, both in 2016.

He is widely known as a developer of method of molecular typing of bacteria MLST.
