= Sophie Marnette =

Sophie Marnette (born 9 June 1969) is Professor of Medieval French Studies at the University of Oxford and the Dervorguilla Fellow and Tutor in French at Balliol College. She is a specialist in French Linguistics and Medieval French Literature. She was the Chair of the Sub-Faculty of French (2016-18) and was a Proctor for the University of Oxford (March 2019 to March 20). She is a founding and executive member of Ci-dit, an international research group on reported discourse.

Marnette has previously held academic positions at the University of Cambridge, Harvard University, Princeton University, the Massachusetts Institute of Technology, the University of California, Berkeley, the University of California, Los Angeles, the University of St Andrews and the Université libre de Bruxelles.

== Early life and education ==
Marnette was born in Liège, Belgium, on 9 June 1969 and was raised in Brussels.

She received her Licence in Romance Philology from the Université libre de Bruxelles in 1991, and her PhD in French (Linguistic track) from the University of California, Berkeley in 1996.

== Selected publications ==
- Narrateur et points de vue dans la littérature française médiévale: Une approche linguistique. Peter Lang. Bern. 1998.
- Speech and Thought Presentation in French: Concept and Strategies. John Benjamins. Amsterdam – New York. 2005.
