= John Maplet =

English physician (c.1612–1670)

- Born: 1612? London
- Died: 4 August 1670; Bath
- Occupation: Physician

John Maplet (1612? – 4 August 1670) was an English physician, and physician to Charles II of England.

== Biography ==
Maplet probably born in 1612 in the parish of St. Martin-le-Grand, London, was son, according to Wood, of 'a sufficient shoemaker.' According to the 'Register of the Parliamentary Visitors to Oxford' (ed. Burrows, p. 488) he was twenty in 1632. He was educated at Westminster School, whence in 1630 he was elected to Christ Church, Oxford. He graduated B.A. on 8 July 1634, MA. on 17 April 1638, and M.D. 24 July 1647. On 9 December 1643 he was elected junior proctor upon the death of William Cartwright, and served for the remainder of the year; and in the autumn of 1647 he was nominated principal of Gloucester Hall, now Worcester College. He was a delegate of the university appointed to receive the parliamentary visitors, and is said to have submitted to their authority. But he quickly left the university. About 1648 he became tutor to Lucius Gary, third lord Falkland, with whom he travelled in France for two years, staying chiefly at Orleans, Blois, and Saumur. During the tour he made many observations, which he committed to writing, 'in a neat and curious hand, with a particular tract of his travels in an elegant Latin style' (Guidott). He afterwards went to Holland and the Low Countries, where an uncle seems to have resided. On 5 March 1651 it was certified to the committee for reformation of the universities that he was ' absent upon leave' (Burrows, p. 329), but while still abroad he appears to have been ejected from his offices at Oxford. On his return he settled as a physician at Bath, practising there in the summer and at Bristol in the winter 'with great respect and veneration from all people in those parts.' He was acquainted with the Thomas Guidott physicians of his time, and helped Guidott in his early days. At the Restoration he resumed the principalship of Gloucester Hall, but retired in 1662. He died at Bath on 4 August 1670, aged 55; his wife died in the following February. In the north aisle of Bath Abbey, where they were buried, an elaborate monument, with a black marble tablet with a Latin inscription to Maplet's memory, was erected by Guidott. Under it is another small tablet with an inscription to his wife, aged 35, and his children, a son John, aged three years, and a daughter Mary, aged three months. Of Maplet Guidott says: 'He was of a tender, brittle constitution, inclining to feminine, clear skinn'd and of a very fresh complexion.' Wood says 'he was learned, candid, and ingenious, a good physician, a better Christian, and an excellent Latin poet.'

Besides 'Familiar Epistles,' Maplet left in manuscript 'Mercurial Epistles,' 'Consultation with Dr. Edmund Meara, Dr. Samuel Bave, and others,' 'Cosmetics,' the 'Treatise of his Travels into the Low Countries and France,' and 'Poems and Epitaphs on Several Occasions and Persons ' (in the Oxford collection), all in Latin. In 1694 Guidott published in quarto Maplet's Epistolarum Medicarum Specimen de Thermarum Bathoniensium Eftectis, which was dedicated to the leading contemporary physicians. Guidott also preserves some Latin verses by him on catarrh in the eyes, some lines headed 'De Catarrhi Fuga' and 'In Primum Canitiem,' with a rhymed translation of the latter. He considers his patron's style terse and his words choice, but his periods a little too elaborate.
