= Joseph Wells (academic) =

British academic

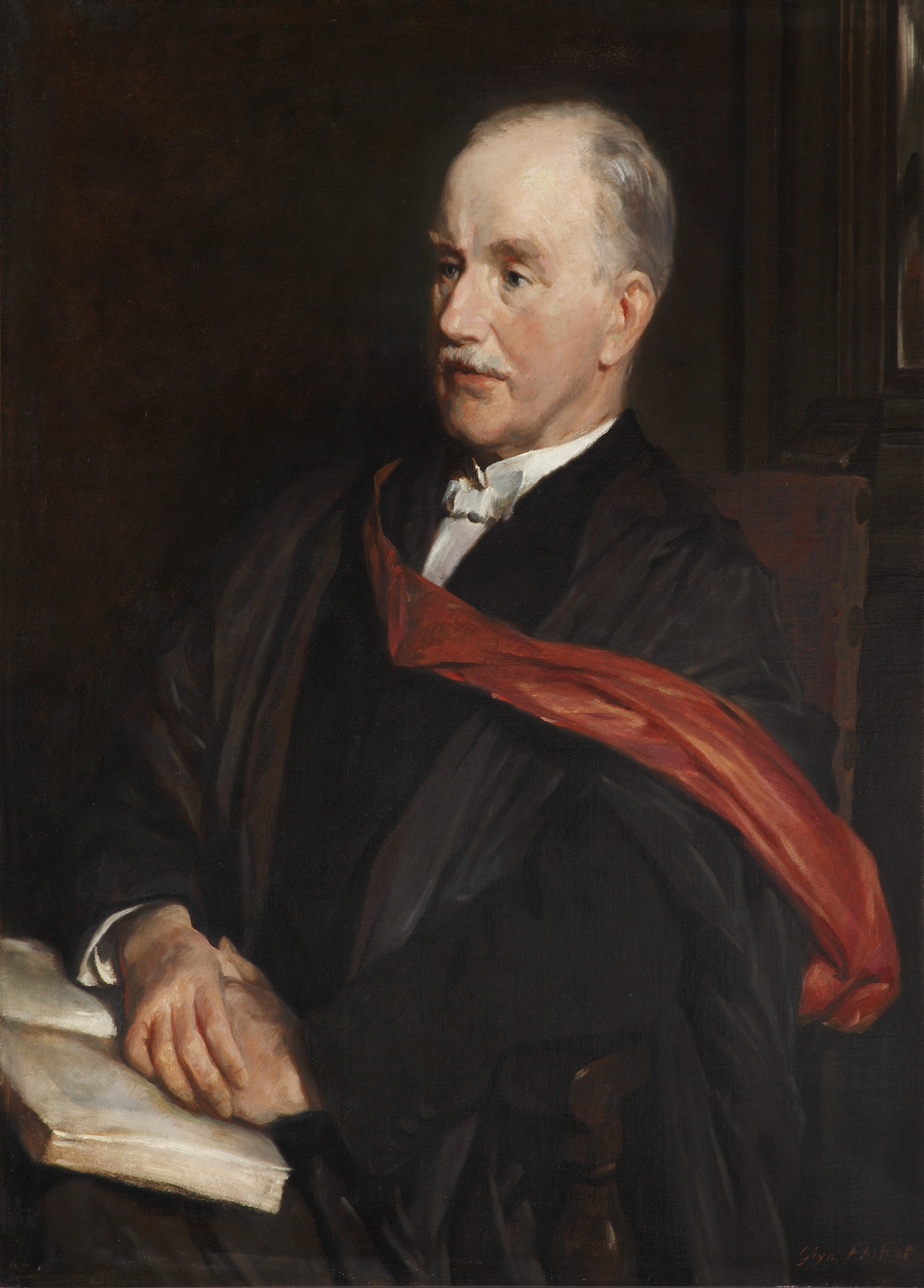
- Joseph Wells, 1924, by Glyn Philpot

Vice-Chancellor of the University of Oxford
- In office 1923–1926
- Preceded by: Lewis Richard Farnell
- Succeeded by: Francis William Pember

Personal details
- Born: 1855
- Died: 1929 (aged 73–74)
- Education: the Queen's College, Oxford

Joseph Wells (30 December 1855 – 1929) was a British author and Oxford academic, where he served as vice-chancellor from 1923 to 1926.

Educated at Reading School and the Queen's College, Oxford, Wells became a tutor in 1883 and then in 1913 Warden of Wadham College, Oxford.

== Selected publications ==
=== Articles ===
- Wells, J. (1907). "The Persian Friends of Herodotus". The Journal of Hellenic Studies. 27: 37–47. doi:10.2307/624403. JSTOR 624403.
- "The Genuineness of the Γῆς περίοδος of Hecataeus". The Journal of Hellenic Studies. 29 (1): 41–52. 1909. doi:10.2307/624641. JSTOR 624641.
- "Cicero and the Conquest of Gaul". The Quarterly Review. 230: 361–379. October 1918.
- Wells, J. (October 1928). "Herodotus and Athens". Classical Philology. 23 (4): 317–331. doi:10.1086/361074. S2CID 162214786.

=== Books ===
- Oxford and its Colleges, etc.
- A Short History of Rome to the Death of Augustus (1896)
- Wadham College (1898)
- The Oxford Degree Ceremony, Clarendon Press (1906)
- The Charm of Oxford (1920)
- ed. (with W. W. How) Herodotus (2 vols)
- Studies in Herodotus, 1923

Academic offices
| Preceded by Patrick Arckley Wright-Henderson | Warden of Wadham College, Oxford; 1913–1927 | Succeeded by John Frederick Stenning |
| Preceded by Lewis Richard Farnell | Vice-Chancellor of Oxford University; 1923–1926 | Succeeded by Francis William Pember |
