= Francis John Lys =

British lecturer and academic administrator

Portrait by Walter Stoneman, 1921

Francis John Lys (1863–1947) was a British lecturer and academic administrator. He was Provost of Worcester College, Oxford (1919–46) and Vice-Chancellor of Oxford University from 1932 until 1935.

The elder son of F. D. Lys, of Highclere, Weymouth, Lys was educated at Sherborne School and Worcester College, Oxford, where he was a Scholar. He gained a first Class in Classical Honour Moderations in 1884, won the Chancellor's Prize for Latin Verse in 1885, and took a Second in Literae Humaniores in 1886.

Lys was briefly an assistant master at Radley College from 1887 to 1888 before returning to Worcester in 1889 as a Lecturer. He went on to become a Fellow of the college, a Tutor, Senior Tutor, Bursar, and finally, from 1919 to 1946, Provost. He was the university's Senior Proctor for 1917–1918 and Vice-Chancellor, 1932–1935.

In 1942, Lys purchased Brockleaze (otherwise known as Brockless Cottage) in Pullens Lane, Headington, a suburb to the east of Oxford, and renamed it "Pullen's Gate". The house was used by the armed forces during the Second World War. His wife lived in the house after his death until 1973.

Academic offices
Preceded by Henry Daniel	Provost of Worcester College, Oxford; 1919–1946	Succeeded by John Cecil Masterman
Preceded by Frederick Homes Dudden	Vice-Chancellor of Oxford University; 1932–1935	Succeeded by Alexander Dunlop Lindsay
