= Walter Bailey (footballer) =

English footballer (1876–c.1895)

Personal information
- Date of birth: 1876
- Place of birth: Birmingham, England
- Position: Inside forward

Senior career*
| Years | Team | Apps | (Gls) |
| 1895–1896 | Grimsby Town | 2 | (0) |
- * Club domestic league appearances and goals

Walter Bailey (1876 – after 1895) was an English professional footballer who played as an inside forward.
