= Betty Kemp =

English historian

Betty Kemp (5 November 1916 – 28 May 2007) was an English historian specialising in the British constitution. She lectured at the University of Manchester before moving to St Hugh's College, Oxford, where she was a Tutor and later a Fellow in Modern History, and Fellow Emerita.

== Early life and education ==
Kemp was born in 1916 in Bowdon, Cheshire to William and Gertrude Kemp, both teachers. She was their eldest child and only daughter. She attended Altrincham High School for Girls until 1933, passing her Higher School Certificate at 16. The school's headmistress later recalled Kemp's "intellectual enthusiasm and ... originality of mind". She immediately entered employment with the Inland Revenue in Northwich, where she remained until 1937, when she enrolled at Manchester University to study history. There, she was a contemporary of Maurice Oldfield, with whom she became close friends. During her degree, she attended A. J. P. Taylor's lectures on modern European history and was unimpressed. In 1939, she won a scholarship for best performance in the Part I exams. In 1940, she received a first-class degree, and won the Thomas Brown memorial prize.

== Career ==
In September 1940, she began a research studentship on medieval history under the supervision of E. F. Jacob, focusing upon the government of London during the reign of Henry V, but this was cut short in December, when she was appointed to the Treasury. She served as Assistant Principal in the Home Finance Division until the end of the Second World War. In the Michaelmas term of 1944, she returned to Manchester, first as a temporary lecturer, then in 1945 as a Lecturer in Modern History under Lewis Namier. Namier involved Kemp in his History of Parliament project, to which she contributed a number of biographies of MPs of the 18th and 19th centuries. Namier's influence led Kemp to change her academic focus from the medieval period to constitutional history.

In October 1946, she joined St Hugh's College as a tutor, and in 1947 was elected a Fellow. In 1957, she published King and Commons 1660–1832, a study of English government from the Restoration to the Reform Act. In 1967, Kemp published her second book, a biography of Francis Dashwood, Sir Francis Dashwood: An Eighteenth Century Independent. A. J. P. Taylor's review noted that historians "usually get [Dashwood] wrong", and noted Kemp's intention to restore Dashwood's reputation, concluding, "he was more fun in the days when he had an undeserved reputation as a scamp." Her third and final book, a biography of Sir Robert Walpole, published 1976, was part of a series on British Prime Ministers, edited by Taylor.

She argued that the Letters of Junius were written by the political philosopher Jean-Louis de Lolme.

== Retirement and later life ==
Kemp retired from St Hugh's College in 1978, but continued to work, researching the life of de Lolme, and completed a monograph on his life and work, The Constitution of England, which remained unpublished. In retirement, Kemp moved several times, to the Cotswolds, to north Oxford, to Cheshire, and back to Oxford, where she spent her final years. She died on 28 May 2007.
