= Charles Mortimer (academic) =

Charles Mortimer, DD (York, 5 April 1726 – Oxford, 26 August 1784) was an Oxford college head.

Mortimer graduated BA from University College, Oxford in 1748. He became a Fellow of Lincoln College, Oxford in 1751. He was Rector of Lincoln College, Oxford from 1781 until his death.
