= Mark Edwards (theologian) =

British scholar

Mark Julian Edwards FBA is a British scholar of Patristics, the New Testament, early Church history and Later Roman philosophy (particularly Neoplatonism). He holds the chair of Professor of Early Christian Studies at Christ Church, Oxford.

== Biography ==
He graduated from Corpus Christi College, Oxford in 1984 with a BA in Literae Humaniores. He received his DPhil entitled "Plotinus and the Gnostics" from Corpus Christi College, Oxford in 1988. He also holds a BA in Theology from New College, Oxford. Lewis Ayres in a recent interview noted that Maurice Wiles remarked that Edwards was the last scholar he had interviewed who received the "gold standard" of degrees in both Classics and Theology.

From 1988 to 1989, Edwards was Hasker Senior Scholar at Exeter College, Oxford and Lecturer in Classics at Balliol College, Oxford. From 1989 to 1992, he held the Esmee Fairbairn Junior Research Fellowship at New College, Oxford and remained at New College from 1992 to 1993 as a British Academy Post-Doctoral Fellow.

In 1993, Edwards was appointed as Tutorial Fellow in Theology at Christ Church, Oxford and University Lecturer in Patristics at the Faculty of Theology and Religion, University of Oxford (then known as the Faculty of Theology). Since 2014, he has held the personal chair of Professor of Early Christian Studies.

Edwards has also been a member of the Steering Committee of the Oxford Centre for Late Antiquity. He also serves on the board of editors for the Oxford Theological Monographs Series, the North American Patristics Society monograph series and the Routledge Studies in Philosophy and Theology in Late Antiquity series. He is also on the editorial board of The Journal of Theological Studies, Church History and Religious Culture and the Schweitzer Journal.

Edwards was elected a Fellow of the British Academy in 2023.

== Main publications ==
- Origen against Plato (Routledge, 2002)
- Catholicity and Heresy in the Early Church (Ashgate, 2009)
- Macarius Magnes (2015). Macarius, Apocriticus. Translated by Schott, Jeremy M.; Edwards, Mark J. Liverpool University Press.
- Aristotle and Early Christian Thought (Taylor & Francis, 2019)
