= Rosemary Bamforth =

Scottish pathologist

Rosemary Margaret Warren Bamforth
- Graduating in 1951
- Born: Rosemary Ince; 19 October 1924; Glasgow
- Died: 17 April 2018 (aged 93)
- Education: Cheltenham Ladies College; University of Glasgow
- Occupation: Pathology
- Spouse: John Bamforth
- Children: 3
- Parents: Douglas Ince (father); Isobel Ince (mother)

Rosemary Bamforth (19 October 1924 – 17 April 2018) was a Scottish pathologist who worked at Bletchley Park during World War II.

Working as a consultant at Southampton Hospital, she made an early link in her research between ship workers dying of mesothelioma and asbestos exposure on ships, before the cause of this illness had been fully determined.

== Personal life ==
Born Rosemary Ince, Bamforth, was born in Glasgow on 19 October 1924. Her parents were Isobel and Douglas Ince, a director of an engineering company. She was one of two children and her brother David Ince, was a Royal Air Force pilot during World War II. Bamforth met John Bamforth while they were both working as doctors at Southampton General Hospital. They married in 1960 and together had two daughters and a son.

Bamforth died on the 17 April 2018 at the age of 93.

== Education ==
Bamforth attended Laurel Bank School in Glasgow followed by Beacon School in Bridge of Allan, she then went on to attend Cheltenham Ladies College.

She planned to study medicine at the University of Glasgow and applied at the age of 16. She was politely rejected and asked to apply again once she was 17. In 1941, she joined instead the Women's Royal Naval Service (WRNS). Bamforth returned to studying medicine after the Second World War and matriculated in 1946 at the University of Glasgow. She graduated with a Bachelor of Medicine in 1951 having received a Further Education and Training Grant.

== Military service ==
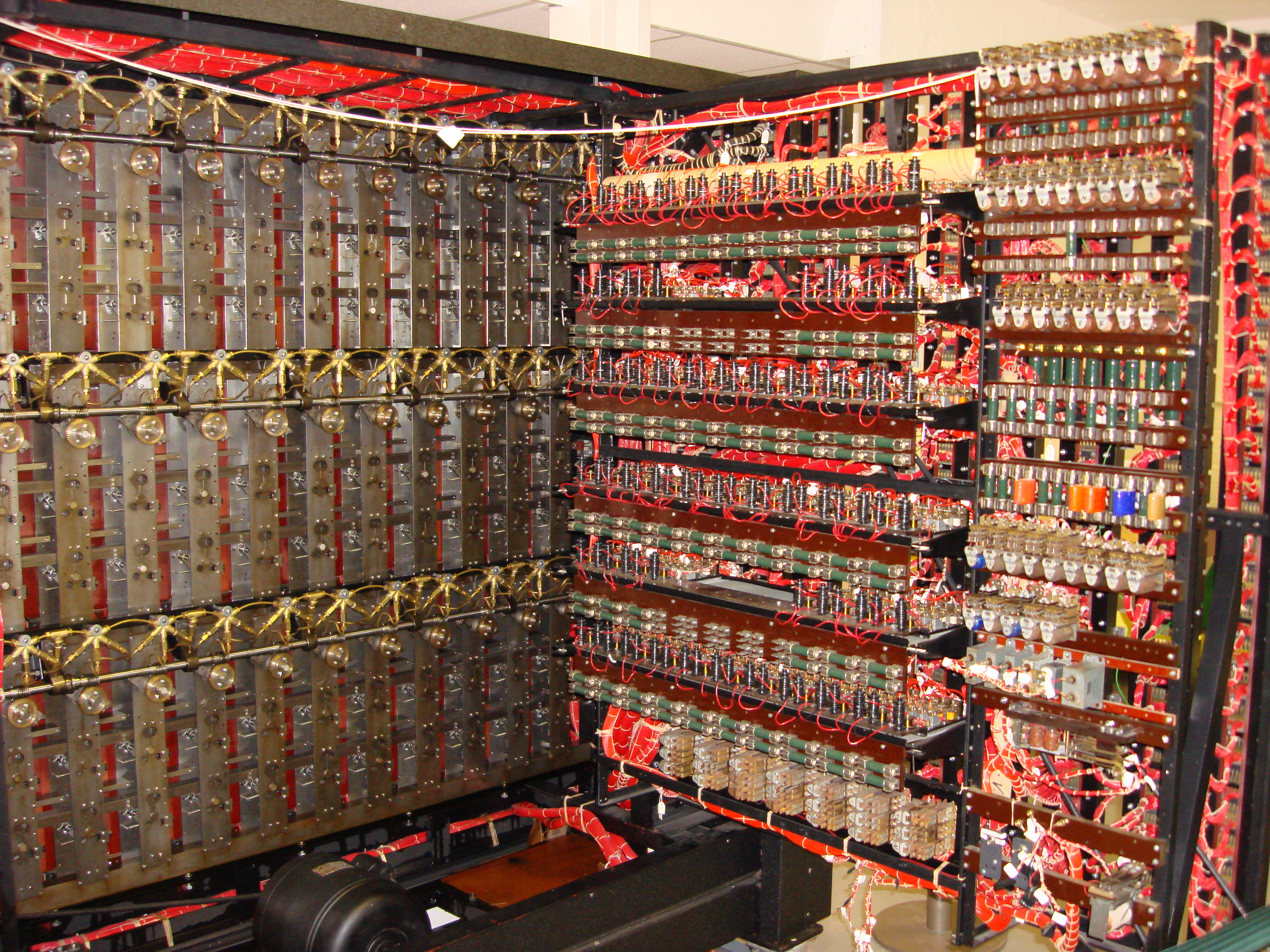
A modern reconstruction of the Bombe machine that she supervised

Bamforth completed her initial WRNS at Balloch by Loch Lomond. She was then posted to Outstation Eastcote in Hillingdon, one of the outstations of Bletchley Park, where she was taught teleprinting. She moved from there to the Bletchley outstation at Stanmore, before eventually joining the team of Hut 11 in Bletchley Park, working on the Turing-Welchman Bombe machines. Bamforth had to keep these details of her military service secret until the mid-1970s when the history of Bletchley Park was declassified.

== Career ==
After graduating, Bamforth built her medical experience at hospitals in North America (McGill University and Meadowbrook Hospital, Long Island) and the UK, where she practised at hospitals in London, Southampton and Portsmouth. Bamforth specialised as a pathologist and during her time in the United States, she became a recognised specialist in the analysis and diagnosis of cancer from the study of tissue samples.

While working at Southampton Hospital as a senior registrar, Bamforth made the link between a number of ship workers dying of mesothelioma and asbestos exposure on ships. She delivered a paper on her findings to Southampton doctors. Her conclusions raised controversy in the profession at the time, but were later backed up by subsequent research into asbestosis.
