= Philip Robins =

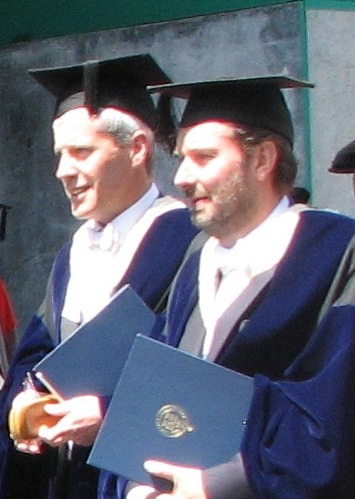
Philip Robins (right) as the Junior Proctor at Encaenia 2009.

Philip Robins is an Oxford University Reader in Politics and International Relations, with special reference to the Middle East, and a Fellow of St. Antony's College, University of Oxford. Before that, he was the Head of the Middle East Program, which he founded, at the Royal Institute of International Affairs, Chatham House, in London, which he joined in September 1987.

Robins has also worked at the Economist Intelligence Unit and as a journalist based in Jordan for the BBC and The Guardian. Dr. Philip Robins is a member of Review of International Law and Politics journal International Advisory Board; and a member of the advisory board of the British Institute at Anakara BIAA.
