= A. D. Woozley =

English philosopher

Anthony Douglas Woozley (/ˈwuːzli/; 1912–2008) was an English philosopher who was Commonwealth Professor of Philosophy at the University of Virginia from 1977 to 1983 and the Chair of Moral Philosophy at the University of St Andrews from 1954 to 1967. He was also known for inaugurating the teaching of law and philosophy at Oxford University.

== Early life and education ==
Woozley was born in Beaconsfield, England, in 1912. He was educated at Haileybury College and The Queen's College, Oxford, where he read Greats. He achieved a double first and was awarded a Prize Fellowship at All Souls College, and the John Locke Scholarship in 1935.

== Academic career ==
In 1937, Woozley became a fellow of The Queen's College, where he was one of the original seven members of the discussion groups formed by Isaiah Berlin and J. L. Austin which were the beginning of Oxford ordinary language philosophy. During this time, Woozley was responsible for teaching philosophy at Queen's, but arranged to have Stuart Hampshire teach Aristotle's Ethics because "he found [Aristotle] to be so sensible so as to be utterly unstimulating." His first major project was his edition of Thomas Reid's Essays on the Intellectual Power of Man (1941).

Before he was sent overseas for the Second World War, Woozley served as an instructor in the Armoured wing of the Officers' Training Corps at Oxford, where, for one term, he taught logic to students at Queen's in the morning and tank-driving to cadets in the afternoon.

After the War, Woozley returned to Oxford, where he suggested to newly appointed Law Fellow Tony Honoré that they might teach a new seminar on law and philosophy. The resulting seminar was first taught in 1951 and marked the beginning of the study of law and philosophy at Oxford. At this time, he also wrote the Theory of Knowledge: An Introduction (1949), which was a widely used introduction in the English-speaking world.

In 1954, Woozley was appointed Professor of Moral Philosophy at the University of St Andrews, where he also edited the Scots Philosophical Quarterly and "helped pioneer the analytical philosophy of law". During this time, he co-authored Plato's Republic: A Philosophical Commentary (1964) with Robert Cross, as well as an edition of John Locke's Essay Concerning Human Understanding (1964). Among his contributions at St Andrews was arranging for the departments of logic and moral philosophy to work in greater proximity of each other.

In 1965, he was a visiting professor at the University of Rochester. From 1967 to his retirement in 1983, Woozley was a professor of law at the University of Virginia, where he taught the philosophy of law at the law school and was Chairman of the Philosophy Department.

== Later life ==
After retiring, Woozley became interested in computers and computer pedagogy. He began using the Nota Bene program and authored the Customization and Programming Guide.

=== Military service ===
From 1940 to 1946, Woozley served in the King's Dragoon Guards, reaching the rank of major. He served in various locations, including North Africa, Italy, Greece, Egypt, Lebanon, Syria, and Palestine.

== Notable works ==
- (Ed.) Thomas Reid, Essays on the Intellectual Powers of Man (Macmillan, 1941).
- Theory of Knowledge: An Introduction (Hutchinson's University Library, 1949).
- Plato's Republic: A Philosophical Commentary (Macmillan, 1964).
- (Ed.) John Locke, An Essay Concerning Human Understanding (W. Collins, 1964).
- Law and Obedience: The Arguments of Plato's Crito (University of North Carolina Press, 1979).
- Nota Bene: Customization and Programming Guide (1994).
