= William Tybard =

William Tybard was an Oxford college head in the 15th-century. He was the second recorded President of Magdalen College, Oxford, serving from 30 Sept 1457 until his resignation on 23 August 1480.
