= Walter Bayley =

English physician

Walter Bayley (1529–1593), was an English physician.

== Life ==
Bayley, called in Latin Bailæus and in English books also Baley and Baily, was born at Portesham, Dorset, in which county his father was a squire. He was educated at Winchester School, and became a fellow of New College in 1550. He graduated M.B. 1557, and M.D. 1563. He was already in holy orders, and was a canon of Wells until 1579. In 1561 he had been appointed regius professor of physic at Oxford University.

In 1566, he married Anne Evans, who lived in Oxford, and they had two sons and four daughters, one of the latter marrying Bayley's successor as regius professor of medicine.

Queen Elizabeth made him one of her physicians, he entered the service of Robert Dudley, 1st Earl of Leicester, and was elected fellow of the College of Physicians in 1581. Latterly, he lived in London. He enjoyed large practice, and died in 1592–3. He is buried in the Chapel of New College, and his son William put up a tablet to his memory.

== Works ==
A Brief Treatise of the Preservation of the Eyesight is the best known of Bayley's works. It appeared in 1586, and was reprinted in 1616 at Oxford. Mainly it is an exposition in English of the opinions on its topic of Rhases, Avicenna, Arnaldus de Villa Nova, and other medieval authorities.The book contains an observation of his own, recording how one Hoorde preserved his sight till over 84 years of age, by the use of eye-bright, in ale and eggs. It also comments on the new method of brewing that had come in during Queen Elizabeth's reign, with some still preferring ale made with "grout" (a plant used before hops, according to the Oxford English Dictionary).

In 1587 Bayley published A Brief Discourse of Certain Bathes of Medicinal Waters in the County of Warwick. He also wrote A Short Discourse of the Three Kinds of Pepper in Common Use.
