= Nicholas Bamforth =

English legal scholar

Nicholas Bamforth BCL, MA (Oxon) is an English legal scholar, who is a Fellow in Law at Queen's College, Oxford, and a lecturer in Law at the University of Oxford since 1999. He had previously worked at UCL and Cambridge. In 2003–04, he was a Hauser Global Research Fellow at New York University.

In October 2006, he became an elected member of the Council of Oxford University. From March 2010 to March 2011, he held the office of Junior Proctor of Oxford University, a post lasting for one year. He has commented from time to time in the media concerning issues relating to university governance.

His research and teaching interests lie in public (constitutional and administrative) law, human rights law, anti-discrimination law and philosophy of law. He edited a set of essays called Sex Rights in 2005, seeking to explore the role and limitations of ideas of human rights in the area of gender and sexuality, a particular topic of interest.

== Books ==
- Sexuality, Morals and Justice (London: Cassell, 1997)
- Public Law in a Multi-layered Constitution (ed. with P. Leyland, Oxford: Hart, 2003)
- Patriarchal Religion, Sexuality and Gender (with D. Richards, Cambridge: Cambridge University Press, 2008)
- Discrimination Law: Theory and Context (with C. O'Cinneide and M. Malik, London: Thomson/Sweet & Maxwell, 2008)

Working on a textbook for Oxford University Press (human rights law) and on a monograph on the public law-private law distinction.

He was editor of Sex Rights, the 2002 series of Oxford Amnesty Lectures concerning human rights, gender and sexuality (Oxford University Press, 2004).
