= Hazel Rossotti =

British chemist and author (1930–2023)

Dr Hazel Rossotti
- Born: Hazel Marsh; 1 February 1930
- Died: 24 December 2023 (aged 93)
- Education: Millfield School
- Alma mater: University of Oxford
- Known for: Chemistry; popular science writing
- Spouse: Francis J.C. Rossotti (1927–2019)
- Scientific career
- Thesis: Some investigations of organic reagents for metals (1954)
- Doctoral advisor: Robert Williams

Hazel Rossotti (1 February 1930 – 24 December 2023) was a British chemist and science writer.

== Early life and education ==
Rossotti (née Marsh) left Millfield School in 1948 and completed her undergraduate and PhD at the University of Oxford. Her research considered the stability of metal-ion complexes, and she worked under the supervision of Robert Williams. In 1952 she married fellow chemist Francis J.C. Rossotti, a fellow graduate student, at St Peter-in-the-East, now part of St Edmund Hall, Oxford.

== Career ==
In 1962 Rossotti was appointed a Fellow and Tutor in chemistry at St Anne's College, Oxford, and retired in 1997. She was an advisor to Mary Archer, and an Emeritus Fellow at St Anne's College, Oxford.

Rossotti held a long-standing passion for photography, and became known as an accomplished photographer. She specialised in black and white portraits, often of scientists and other colleagues. In 1974, Rossotti nominated French artist and photographer Henri Cartier-Bresson for an honorary doctorate at the University of Oxford. To mark this award, Cartier-Bresson gifted Rossotti a silver gelatine print of a 1938 photograph of 'Sunday on the Banks of the River Seine'. This print is now held in the Bodleian libraries. In 1997, Rossotti designed and made the stained glass panels in the library building, Hartland house.

== Books ==
Rossotti published numerous science books, on diverse topics from chemistry to colour, fire and Greece. Oliver Sacks remarked that Rossotti was a born teacher and writer, 'incapable of writing a dull word'.

- 1969 - Chemical Applications of Potentiometry
- 1970 - H2O
- 1971 - Metals
- 1975 - Air
- 1975 - Introducing Chemistry
- 1978 - Study of Ionic Equilibria
- 1985 - Why the World Isn't Grey
- 1993 - Fire
- 1998 - Diverse Atoms
- 2006 - Chemistry in the Schoolroom: 1806
