= Lofty Herman =

English cricketer (1907–1987)

Personal information
- Full name: Oswald William Herman
- Born: 18 September 1907; Horspath, Oxfordshire, England
- Died: 24 June 1987 (aged 79); Southampton, Hampshire, England
- Batting: Right-handed
- Bowling: Right-arm fast-medium Right-arm off break
- Relatives: Bob Herman (son)

Domestic team information
- Years: Team
- 1927: Oxfordshire
- 1929–1948: Hampshire
- 1950–1951: Wiltshire

Umpiring information
- FC umpired: 210 (1963–1974)
- LA umpired: 53 (1963–1971)

Career statistics
Competition	First-class
Matches	322
Runs scored	4,336
Batting average	11.08
100s/50s	–/10
Top score	92
Balls bowled	56,468
Wickets	1,045
Bowling average	27.00
5 wickets in innings	58
10 wickets in match	6
Best bowling	8/49
Catches/stumpings	122/–
- Source: Cricinfo, 16 April 2023

Oswald William "Lofty" Herman (18 September 1907 – 24 June 1987) was an English first-class cricketer and cricket umpire. Herman played county cricket either side of the Second World War for Hampshire, taking over 1,000 wickets as a right-arm fast-medium and later off break bowler, whilst also scoring over 4,000 runs. He later became an umpire, standing in over 200 first-class and 50 List A one-day matches.

== Playing career ==
Herman was born in September 1907 at Horspath, Oxfordshire. He played club cricket for Horspath Cricket Club as a tall right-arm fast-medium bowler, and played minor counties cricket for Oxfordshire in 1927, making a single appearance against Monmouthshire in the Minor Counties Championship. Having impressed at club level, he was recruited by Hampshire and after meeting his qualification requirements to play for the county, he made his debut in first-class cricket against Glamorgan at Swansea in the 1929 County Championship. His first season at Hampshire saw Herman take 60 wickets at an average of 25.01, which included four five wicket hauls. Although he was less effective in 1930, with 38 wickets, he did manage to record his career best bowling figures of 8 for 49 against Yorkshire at Bournemouth. He was a consistent bowler for the remainder of the 1930s, taking over 100 wickets in a season on four occasions (1932 and 1936–38). His best season came in 1937, when he took 142 wickets at an average of 22.07 and was Hampshire's leading wicket-taker, a feat he also achieved in the previous season. In 1939, he left Hampshire to play in the Lancashire League for Rochdale Cricket Club, on a two-year contract.

Herman returned to Hampshire following World War II, when Hampshire, under the captaincy of Desmond Eagar, were looking to rebuild after the war. His return was met with immediate success, with Herman taking 100 wickets in a season for the fifth time. In the proceeding two seasons, he took a combined total of 112 wickets. However, with the emergence of Derek Shackleton, he found himself playing for the second eleven in 1949, and retired from first-class cricket at the end of that season. A tall right-arm fast-medium bowler, in the latter part of his career he took to bowling off break bowling alongside his seam bowling. Herman often did this when the pitch favoured spin bowling or when the shine was off the ball. Wisden noted that this late addition to his bowling repertoire was considerably successful. In total for Hampshire, he took 1,041 wickets at an average of 27.02; he took a five wicket haul on 58 occasions and took ten wickets in a match on six. As of 2023, he was Hampshire's seventh leading wicket-taker in first-class cricket. Wisden remarked that "he batted after the old-fashioned tradition of fast bowlers", as a hard-hitting lower-order batsman. In 321 matches for Hampshire, he scored 4,237 runs at a batting average of 11.09; he made ten half centuries and recorded his highest score of 92 against Leicestershire in 1948. His most successful season came in 1937, with 801 runs. Such was his success that season, Wisden considered him to close being an all-rounder. In addition to playing first-class cricket for Hampshire, Herman also made a single appearance for the Players in the Gentlemen v Players fixture at The Oval in 1932.

Like many cricketers of that era, Herman also played football. Throughout the 1930s he turned out frequently for East Meon F.C. in the Waterlooville and District League at inside-left or left-half.

== Post-retirement ==
Following his retirement, he played minor counties cricket for Wiltshire in 1950 and 1951, where he had become solely an off break bowler. In retirement, he also worked as a publican, and later as a cricket coach, including at Butlin's Filey holiday camp, and at Harrow School, and played his club cricket for Harrow Town Cricket Club in the late 1950s and early 1960s. Herman later became an umpire. His club cricket at the end of the 1950s was played for Harrow Town Cricket Club. In 1963, he joined the list of first-class umpires and stood in his first match between Sussex and Worcestershire in the County Championship. He remained on the first-class umpires list until 1971, having stood in 206 first-class and 53 List A one-day matches. After his removal from the first-class umpires list, Herman stood in four further first-class matches, three of which were in matches for Derrick Robins personal eleven in 1973 and 1974.

Herman died in hospital at Southampton on 24 June 1987 after a long illness. His son, Bob, was also a first-class cricketer.
