= Thomas Bayley =

Thomas Bayley may refer to:

- Thomas Bayley (politician) (1846–1906), English politician
- Thomas Bayley (academic) (died 1706), English academic
- Thomas Butterworth Bayley (1744–1802), English magistrate, agriculturist and philanthropist
- Tom Bayley (footballer, born 1868) (1868–after 1899), English footballer
- Tom Bayley (footballer, born 1921) (1921–1996), English footballer

== See also ==
- Thomas Bailey (disambiguation)
- Thomas Bayley Potter (1817–1898), British Liberal Party politician
- Thomas Bayly (disambiguation)
- Thomas Baillie (disambiguation)
