= Edward Ellerton =

English cleric, academic and schoolmaster

Edward Ellerton, DD (1770–1851) was an English cleric, academic and schoolmaster, known as a founder of scholarships.

== Life ==
He was the son of Richard Ellerton of Downholme, Yorkshire and his wife Catherine Whitelock, born on 30 January 1771. He was educated at Richmond School, and matriculated at University College, Oxford, graduating BA in 1792, and MA in 1795.

Ellerton was appointed master of Magdalen College School in 1799; was afterwards elected fellow of the college, and proceeded BD in 1805, and DD in 1815. He was appointed to the perpetual curacy of Horspath, Oxfordshire, in 1814, and to the perpetual curacy of Sevenhampton, Gloucestershire, in 1825. He resigned the latter charge early in 1851. For some time also he acted as curate to Martin Routh, the president of Magdalen, at Theale near Reading, a chapelry attached to the rectory of Tilehurst.

A lecturer in divinity, and senior fellow of Magdalen College, Ellerton died at his curacy of Theale on 26 December 1851.

== Legacy ==
Ellerton was the founder of scholarships and prizes. In 1825 he established an annual prize of twenty guineas (£21), open to all members of the University of Oxford who had passed the examination for their first degree, the prize to be given for the best English essay on some theological subject. In the earlier part of Edward Pusey's career, Ellerton was his close friend, and, in conjunction with Pusey and his brother Philip, he founded in 1832 the Pusey and Ellerton scholarships, three in number, which were open to all members of the university, and of the annual value of £30 each.

Magdalen College (where Ellerton had for many years been the only tutor, and at times bursar) also shared in his benefactions. In addition to other gifts, in 1835 he founded an annual exhibition for the best reader of the lessons in the college chapel, and in 1849 an annual exhibition for the best scholar among the choristers; and by his will he founded in Magdalen College two annual exhibitions for students in Hebrew. He further established an exhibition for boys educated at Richmond School.

== Works ==
Ellerton was a firm Protestant, and in 1845 published a brief polemical treatise on The Evils and Dangers of Tractarianism.
