= David Clary =

British theoretical chemist

Sir David Clary FRS
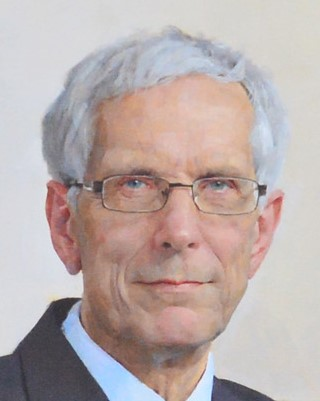
- Sir David Clary, from the portrait by Keith Breeden
- Born: David Charles Clary; 14 January 1953 (age 73); Halesworth, Suffolk, United Kingdom
- Education: University of Sussex (BSc); University of Cambridge (PhD)
- Known for: Quantum theory for chemical reactions
- Spouse: Heather Ann Clary
- Awards: FRS (1997); Knight Bachelor (2016); International Honorary Member of American Academy of Arts and Sciences (2003); Royal Society of Chemistry: Meldola Medal and Prize (1981), Marlow Award (1986), Corday-Morgan Prize (1989), Chemical Dynamics Award (1998), Tilden Prize (1998), Polanyi Medal (2004), Liversidge Award (2010), Spiers Memorial Award (2018); Annual Medal of International Academy of Quantum Molecular Science (1989)
- Scientific career
- Fields: Theoretical Chemistry
- Workplaces: IBM San Jose California; University of Manchester Institute of Science and Technology; University of Cambridge; Magdalene College, Cambridge; University College London; University of Oxford; Magdalen College, Oxford; Foreign & Commonwealth Office
- Doctoral advisor: Nicholas C. Handy

President of Magdalen College, Oxford
- In office 2005 – 31 August 2020
- Preceded by: Anthony Smith (producer)
- Succeeded by: Dinah Rose
- Website: www.magd.ox.ac.uk/people/professor-sir-david-clary/

Sir David Charles Clary, FRS (born 14 January 1953) is a British theoretical chemist. He was president of Magdalen College, Oxford, from 2005 to 2020. He was the first chief scientific adviser to the Foreign and Commonwealth Office from 2009 to 2013. He is a Professor of Chemistry at the University of Oxford.

== Education ==
He was born in Halesworth, Suffolk, and attended Colchester Royal Grammar School from 1964 to 1971. He has a BSc (1974) from the University of Sussex and a PhD (1977) and ScD (1997) from the University of Cambridge, where he was at Corpus Christi College. He undertook post-doctoral research at IBM in San Jose, California, and at the University of Manchester.

== Appointments ==
In 1980, he was appointed lecturer at the University of Manchester Institute of Science and Technology (UMIST). In 1983, he was appointed lecturer and then reader in theoretical chemistry at the University of Cambridge, where he was fellow and senior tutor of Magdalene College. In 1996, he was made director of the Centre for Theoretical and Computational Chemistry and professor at University College London. In 2002, he moved to the University of Oxford, where he was head of the Division of Mathematical and Physical Sciences and professorial fellow of St John's College. He was elected President of Magdalen College, Oxford in 2005.

He was editor of Chemical Physics Letters from 2000–2020 and was a reviewing editor of Science from 2003–16. He has held numerous visiting fellowships and given several named lectures.

Some of his work as the first chief scientific advisor to the Foreign and Commonwealth Office is described in an article in Science and Diplomacy.

== Awards ==
In 1997 Clary was elected a Fellow of the Royal Society for his development of the quantum theory for chemical reactions. He is a Fellow of the American Association for the Advancement of Science, the American Physical Society, the Royal Society of Chemistry (RSC) and the Institute of Physics; International Honorary Member of the American Academy of Arts and Sciences and a member of the International Academy of Quantum Molecular Science. He was elected Einstein Professor of the Chinese Academy of Sciences in 2014 and an honorary fellow of the Chemical Research Society of India in 2019. He received an honorary DSc from the University of Sussex (2011), and was elected an honorary fellow of Magdalene College, Cambridge in 2005 and Magdalen College, Oxford in 2020.

Clary was knighted in the Queen's 2016 Birthday Honours for services to international science. The citation for his knighthood stated:

"Professor Clary has made an outstanding contribution to enhancing the international reputation of UK science and higher education. Through his leadership, he has enhanced Magdalen College’s position as one of the leading academic institutions in the world. In his own scientific research he developed new theories for calculating the rates of chemical reactions. As Head of the Division of Mathematical and Physical Sciences at Oxford University he facilitated links between physical, life and medical sciences, helping to raise Oxford's profile as a leader for scientific research and innovation. As the first FCO Chief Scientific Adviser he enhanced significantly the visibility of UK science and innovation overseas, being a major proponent of using scientific collaborations to enhance international relations."

== Research ==
The citation for his election as a Fellow of the Royal Society states:

"Professor Clary is distinguished for his use of quantum collision theory as a practical tool for explaining a wide variety of experimental results in chemical reaction dynamics. His general theories and computational methods enable reliable predictions to be made on the reactions, energy transfer and dissociation of polyatomic molecules in selected quantum states. His work also has important applications in understanding interstellar, combustion and atmospheric chemistry, as the extreme temperatures of these environments can be hard to reproduce in the laboratory, but are readily treated with these theoretical methods."

His current research focus is in developing semiclassical rate theories for chemical reactions.

He is an authority on Erwin Schrödinger, the discoverer of the form of quantum theory known as wave mechanics and Fellow of Magdalen College, Oxford.

== Books ==
- Schrödinger in Oxford, World Scientific Publishing, 2022.
- The Lost Scientists of World War II, World Scientific Publishing, 2024.
- Walter Kohn: From Kindertransport and Internment to DFT and the Nobel Prize, World Scientific Publishing, 2024.

Academic offices
Preceded by Anthony Smith	President of Magdalen College, Oxford; 2005–2020	Succeeded by Dinah Rose
