= Thomas Bayley (academic) =

English academic

Thomas Bayley was an English academic.

Bayley was educated at Magdalen College, Oxford, of which college he was a Fellow from 1664 to 1689. He was Magdalen's President from 1703 until his death on 15 August 1706. He held livings at Fordham and Slimbridge.

| Preceded by John Rogers | President of Magdalen College, Oxford; 1706–1722 | Succeeded by Joseph Harwar |
