= John Hornley =

First president of Magdalen College

John Hornley was the first recorded President of Magdalen College, Oxford serving from 8 August 1448 until his death on 25 September 1457.
