= Anthony Smith (producer) =

British broadcaster (1938–2021)

Anthony Smith CBE

President of Magdalen College, Oxford
- In office 1988–2005
- Succeeded by: David Clary

Personal details
- Born: Anthony Smith; 14 March 1938
- Died: 28 November 2021 (aged 83) Albany
- Education: Magdalen College, Oxford
- Profession: Broadcaster; Academic

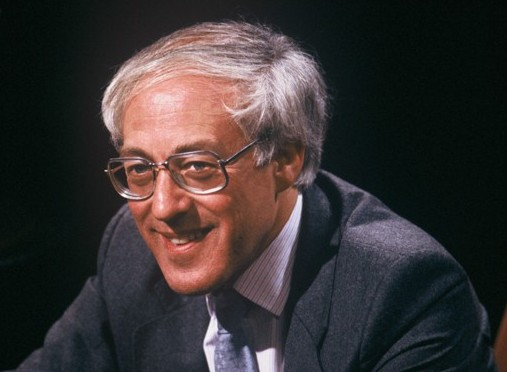
Appearing on television discussion programme After Dark in 1987

Anthony David Smith (14 March 1938 – 28 November 2021) was a British broadcaster, author and academic, who was president of Magdalen College, Oxford, from 1988 to 2005.

== Life and career ==
Smith was born on 14 March 1938 and attended Harrow County School for Boys (now Harrow High School), from 1949 to 1956. He read English at Brasenose College, Oxford.

His career in broadcasting started as a producer of current affairs programmes on the BBC in the 1960s. He became responsible for running the nightly news programme Twenty-Four Hours.

In the early 1970s, he became a research fellow at St Antony's College, Oxford. He worked for the Annan Committee on The Future of Broadcasting, and became engaged in the national debate which led to the foundation of the UK's Channel 4. He was subsequently appointed a board director of Channel 4 (1981–1985). He carried out research for the McGregor Commission on the Press, which presented its report in 1976.

Between 1979 and 1988, he was director of the British Film Institute and was involved in the conception and establishment of the Museum of the Moving Image on London's South Bank.

In 1988 he was elected President of Magdalen College, Oxford, and he retired from this position in 2005.

He was made CBE in 1987, and was awarded an honorary degree (Doctor of Arts) by Oxford Brookes University in 1997.

He was for four years a Member of the Arts Council of Great Britain and had a long association with the Writers & Scholars Educational Trust, (which produces Index on Censorship), acting for several years as its chairman. He was for 10 years a member of the Cambodia Trust for the rehabilitation of landmine victims, and also was for 10 years chairman of the Jan Hus Educational Foundation which was active in helping intellectuals and academics in Czechia and Slovakia in the years before and after the Velvet Revolution of 1989.

Smith was a patron of the London Film School, trustee of the Prince of Wales's School of Traditional Arts, and a board member of the British Institute of Florence, of the Choir of the Sixteen and of the Medical Research Foundation.

He was also chair of the Hill Foundation, which provides scholarships for Russian students to study at Oxford University, and was also chair of the Oxford-Russia Fund, which provides scholarships for students attending universities within Russia, provides English-language books to Russian universities and also sponsors public discussion of topics affecting higher education in Russia.

Smith died from kidney failure at his home at Albany, in Piccadilly, London, on 28 November 2021, at the age of 83.

== Writing ==
Smith wrote on broadcasting and the Press, and on the modern information industries in general. His books include:

- (ed.) British Broadcasting (David & Charles, 1974), ISBN 978-0-7153-6326-3
- (ed.) The British Press Since the War (David & Charles, 1974) ISBN 978-0-7153-6573-1
- The Shadow in the Cave: a Study of the Relationship Between the Broadcaster, his Audience and the State (Quartet Books, 1976) ISBN 978-0-04-791029-6
- (ed.) Subsidies and the Press in Europe (PEP, 1977) ISBN 978-0-85374-156-5
- The Politics of Information: Problems of Policy in Modern Media (Macmillan, 1978) ISBN 978-0-333-23610-9
- The Newspaper: an International History (Thames and Hudson, 1979) ISBN 978-0-500-27286-2
- (ed.) Television and Political Life: Studies in Six European Countries (Macmillan, 1979) ISBN 978-0-333-24328-2
- Goodbye Gutenberg: the Newspaper Revolution of the 1980s (Oxford University Press, 1980) ISBN 978-0-19-502709-9
- The Geopolitics of Information: How Western Culture Dominates the World (Faber & Faber, 1980) ISBN 978-0-19-520208-3
- Licences and Liberty: the Future of Public Service Broadcasting (Acton Society, 1985) ISBN 978-0-85000-021-4
- (ed. with James Curran and Pauline Wingate) Impacts and Influences: Essays on Media Power in the Twentieth Century (Methuen, 1987) ISBN 978-0-416-00602-5
- Broadcasting and society in 1990s Britain (W.H. Smith, 1990)
- The Age of Behemoths: the Globalization of Mass Media Firms (New York : Priority Press, 1991)
- Books to Bytes: Knowledge and Information in the Postmodern Era (British Film Institute, 1993) ISBN 978-0-85170-402-9
- Disinterested Bystanders: Reconciling Media Freedom and Responsibility (John Stuart Mill Institute, 1996) ISBN 978-1-871952-11-7
- Software for the Self: Technology and Culture (Oxford University Press, 1996) ISBN 978-0-19-503900-9
- (ed. with Richard Paterson) Television : an International History (Oxford University Press, 1998) ISBN 978-0-19-815928-5

Academic offices
Preceded by Keith B. Griffin	President of Magdalen College, Oxford; 1988–2005	Succeeded by David Clary
