= John Simons (chemist) =

English chemist

John Philip Simons FRS FRSC (born 20 April 1934) is a British physical chemist known for his research in photochemistry and photophysics, molecular reaction dynamics and the spectroscopy of biological molecules. He was professor of physical chemistry at the University of Nottingham (1981–93) and Dr. Lee's Professor of Chemistry at the University of Oxford (1993–99).

== Education ==
Simons studied at the University of Cambridge, graduating in 1955. His PhD is from Cambridge, under the supervision of Ronald George Wreyford Norrish.

== Career ==
Simons first worked at the University of Birmingham, successively holding positions as an ICI Fellow (1960), lecturer (1961–67), reader (from 1975) and professor of photochemistry from 1979. In 1981 he became professor of physical chemistry at the University of Nottingham. In 1993 he was appointed Dr. Lee's Professor of Chemistry at the University of Oxford and fellow of Exeter College. He retired in 1999.

== Research ==
Simons' initial research at the University of Birmingham investigated the dynamics of molecular photodisassociation. The development of a high-speed rotor by Philip Burton Moon at Birmingham allowed Simons to apply this apparatus with crossed molecular beams at supersonic speed to examining the dynamics of photochemical reactions and bimolecular collisions. At Nottingham, he started to use tuneable lasers to investigate reaction dynamics. He was a pioneer of the use of Doppler-resolved, polarised laser spectroscopy to generate three-dimensional images of molecules colliding (stereodynamics), and is regarded as "one of the founding fathers in the field of 'stereodynamics'".

His later research at Oxford used infrared and ultraviolet laser spectroscopy and quantum chemical calculations to investigate the three-dimensional structure and interactions of carbohydrates, peptides, neurotransmitters and other small biomolecules in the absence of environmental noise.

== Awards and honours ==
Simons was elected Fellow of the Royal Society of Chemistry in 1979, and served as honorary secretary and president of the society's Faraday Division (1993–95). He became a Fellow of the Royal Society in 1989, and served on the society's Council (1999–2000). He gave the Royal Society's Humphry Davy Lecture (2001) and received the society's Davy Medal in 2007. Other awards include the Royal Society of Chemistry's Tilden Prize (1982–3), Chemical Dynamics Award (1993), Polanyi Medal (1996), Spiers Memorial Award (1999) and Liversidge Award (2007). He held a visiting Miller Professorship at the University of California, Berkeley.

In 2002 he received an honorary doctorate (DSc) from the University of Birmingham. In 2005, a special edition of the journal Molecular Physics was published to honour Simons' seventieth birthday, the previous year.

== Publications ==
- Photochemistry and Spectroscopy (Wiley-Interscience; 1971) (ISBN 9780471792024)
