= Lawrence Humphrey =

English theologian (died 1589)

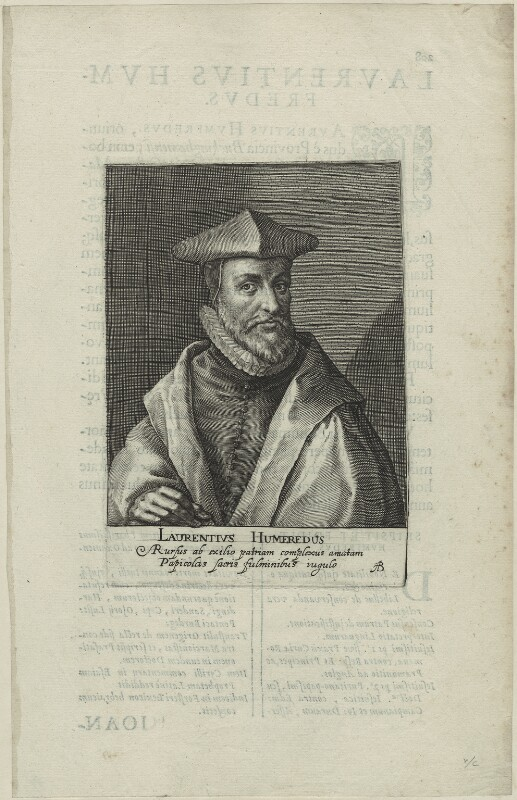
- Died: 1 February 1589
- Occupation: Theologian

Lawrence Humphrey (or Laurence Humfrey) DD (1525/7? – 1 February 1589) was an English theologian, who was President of Magdalen College, Oxford, and Dean successively of Gloucester and Winchester.

== Biography ==
Humphrey was born at Newport Pagnell, Buckinghamshire, England. He was first educated at the University of Cambridge.

He was elected to a demy at Magdalen College in 1546 and Fellow in 1548. He graduated BA in. 1549, MA in 1552, and BD and DD in 1562. He was noted as one of the most promising pupils of Pietro Martire Vermigli, and on Mary's accession obtained leave from his college to travel abroad. He lived at Basel, Zürich, Frankfurt and Geneva, making the acquaintance of the leading Swiss divines, whose ecclesiastical views he adopted. His leave of absence having expired in 1556, he ceased to be fellow of Magdalen.

Humphrey returned to England at Elizabeth I's accession, was appointed Regius Professor of Divinity at Oxford in 1560, and was recommended by Archbishop Parker and others for election as President of Magdalen College. The fellows refused at first to elect so pronounced a reformer, but they yielded in 1561, and Humphrey gradually converted the college into a stronghold of Puritanism.

In 1564, Humphrey and his friend Thomas Sampson, Dean of Christ Church, Oxford, were called before Parker for refusing to wear the prescribed ecclesiastical vestments; and a prolonged struggle, the vestments controversy, broke out, in which Bullinger and other foreign theologians took part as well as most of the leading divines in England. In spite of Bullinger's advice, Humphrey refused to conform; and Parker wished to deprive him as well as Sampson. But the presidency of Magdalen was elective and the visitor of the college was not Parker but the Bishop of Winchester; and Humphrey escaped with temporary retirement. Parker, in fact, was not supported by the council; in 1566 Humphrey was selected to preach at St Paul's Cross, and was allowed to do so without the vestments.

In the same year, Humphrey took a prominent part in the ceremonies connected with Elizabeth's visit to Oxford. On this occasion he wore his doctor's gown and habit, which the queen told him became him very well; and his resistance now began to weaken. He yielded on the point before 1571 when he was made dean of Gloucester. In 1578 he was one of the divines selected to attend a diet at Schmalkalde to discuss the project of a theological accommodation between the Lutheran and Reformed churches; and in 1580 he was made Dean of Winchester. In 1585 he was persuaded by his bishop, Cooper, to restore the use of surplices in Magdalen College chapel. He died on 1 February 1590 and was buried in the college chapel, where there is a mural monument to his memory; a portrait is in Magdalen College school.

== Works ==
Humphrey was a prolific writer on theological and other subjects. At Parker's request, he wrote a life of his friend and patron Bishop Jewel, which was published in 1573 and was also prefixed to the edition of Jewel's works issued in 1600. One of his books against the Jesuits was included in vol. iii. of the Doctrina Jesuitarum per van os authores, published at La Rochelle (6 volumes, 1585–1586).

== Family ==
About the beginning of the reign of Elizabeth I, Lawrence married Joan Inkfordby, daughter of Andrew Inkfordby of Ipswich. By her he had seven sons and five daughters. Joan died 27 August 1611 "aged 74" and was buried at the church of Steeple Barton in Oxfordshire. Her eldest daughter Justina Dormer, wife of Caspar Dormer, esquire, erected a monument to her memory there. Her third daughter Judith was the third wife of Sir Edmund Carey (died 1637), brother of the Earl of Monmouth.

== Sources ==
Academic offices
Preceded by Richard Smyth	Regius Professor of Divinity at Oxford; 1560–1589	Succeeded by Thomas Holland
Preceded by Thomas Coveney	President of Magdalen College, Oxford; 1561–1589	Succeeded by Nicholas Bond
Preceded by Thomas Cowper	Vice-Chancellor of Oxford University; 1571–1576	Succeeded by Herbert Westphaling
