= Michael Barratt (television presenter) =

English television presenter (1928–2022)

- Born: Michael Fieldhouse Barratt; 3 January 1928; Leeds, West Riding of Yorkshire
- Died: 10 July 2022 (aged 94); Maidenhead, Berkshire
- Occupations: Journalist; Television presenter
- Television: 24 Hours; Nationwide; Reporting London
- Spouses: Joan Warner (m. 1952, dissolved); Dilys Morgan (m. 1977)
- Children: 9

Michael Fieldhouse Barratt (3 January 1928 – 10 July 2022) was an English television presenter and journalist. He was best known for his period as the main presenter of Nationwide from 1969 to 1977.

== Early life and career ==
Michael Barratt was born in Leeds, West Riding of Yorkshire. His father, Wallace Barratt, was a tax inspector, while Doris, his mother died of tuberculosis when Michael was aged six. Barratt was educated at Rossall School, an independent boys' school near Fleetwood, Lancashire, and at Paisley Grammar School in Scotland. After leaving school and learning shorthand, he joined Kemsley Newspapers in Glasgow, beginning as a tea boy and horoscope writer on the Sunday Mail. By 18, he was chief sub-editor on the sports pages of the Daily Record. Moving south, in 1952 he became sports editor on the Loughborough Monitor in Leicestershire, where he met Joan Warner, who would become his first wife. In 1956, he moved to Nigeria for a year having been appointed as the assistant editor of the Nigerian Citizen in Zaria. Barratt also worked for the Nigerian Broadcasting Service beginning a discussion programme on politics. Following his return to the UK, he worked as a production journalist on several English regional newspapers including a period at the Wolverhampton Express & Star.

At the same time, he contributed regularly to the BBC World Service and began a freelance television reporting career, initially on the Midlands regional current affairs magazine Scan which had begun by 1961, and then as a freelance reporter on the BBC current affairs programme Midlands Today.

== Career from 1963 ==
Barratt joined Panorama in 1963 as a reporter and was much influenced, he said, by its lead presenter Richard Dimbleby. He was sent to cover international stories, which included an interview with the theologian and humanitarian Albert Schweitzer. After two years on Panorama, he was asked to help establish 24 Hours.

He was a Nationwide presenter from 1969 to 1977. Its creator, editor of television news Derrick Amoore, recognised the regional news programmes could help maintain an audience which had previously fallen away. Nationwide reached an audience of 11 million each evening at its height. "A lot of people at the BBC thought Nationwide was a scatty idea," he once said. "It was live television taking in all 11 regions of the country, which was unheard of at the time... things went drastically wrong technically. For the first three months we had egg on our faces every night. We were close to being a laughing stock."

He was chairman of BBC Radio 4's Gardeners' Question Time from 1973 to 1977. He was also a presenter of Songs of Praise. Later, he worked on Thames Television's Reporting London in the 1980s. He appeared, as himself, in the film The Magic Christian. He regularly appeared on The Goodies, playing himself as a serious newsreader. In one episode, which was dedicated to punk rock, Barratt was depicted reading the news with a large safety-pin through his nose. In 1972, he was elected Rector of the University of Aberdeen.

Barratt wrote several books including Michael Barratt's Complete Gardening Guide, Michael Barratt, Making the Most of the Media, and Making the Most of Retirement. His autobiography, Mr. Nationwide, was published in 2012.

== Personal life ==
He married twice and had nine children:

1. Joan Warner in 1952. (3 sons and 3 daughters); marriage dissolved.
2. Nationwide presenter Dilys Morgan on 7 August 1977. (2 sons and 1 daughter).

Barratt died in the Thames Hospice in Berkshire on 10 July 2022, aged 94.

Academic offices
Preceded by Jo Grimond	Rector of the University of Aberdeen; 1972–1975	Succeeded by Iain Cuthbertson
