= William Merry (priest) =

English classical scholar, clergyman and educator

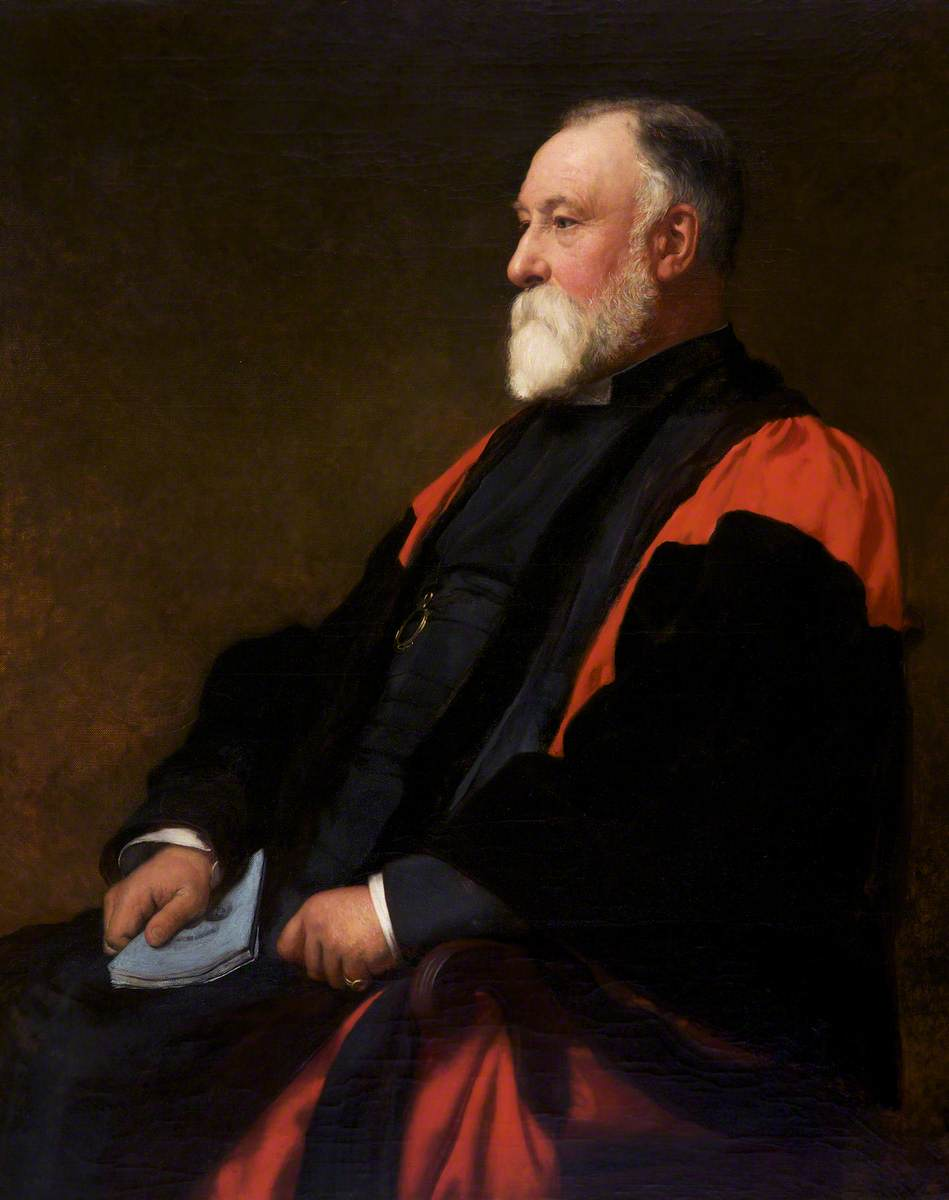
William Walter Merry

William Walter Merry (1835–1918) was an English classical scholar, clergyman, and educator.

== Life ==
William Merry was born in Evesham, Worcestershire, and was educated at Cheltenham College and Balliol College, Oxford, where he gained the Chancellor's Prize for a Latin essay in 1858. He was fellow and lecturer of Lincoln College, Oxford, from 1859 and Rector (head) of the College from 1884. He was select preacher to the University in 1878–79 and in 1889–90, and Whitehall preacher in 1883–84; public orator at Oxford from 1880 to 1910; a member of the Hebdomadal Council (1896–1908); and Vice-Chancellor (1904–06).

== Works ==
For many years he was engaged in the preparation of editions of the classical authors, published by the Clarendon Press, Oxford. These included Homer's Odyssey (books i to xii, with James Riddell; second edition, 1886); a school edition of the same books and another of books xiii to xxiv; and a series of editions of the plays of Aristophanes, begun in 1879. (Some of these have gone through several editions). His other works in classical literature are The Greek Dialects (1875) and Selected Fragments of Roman Poetry (second edition, 1901).

== Sources ==
Academic offices
Preceded by Mark Pattison	Rector of Lincoln College, Oxford; 1884–1918	Succeeded by John Arthur Ruskin Munro
Preceded by David Binning Monro	Vice-Chancellor of Oxford University; 1904–1906	Succeeded by Thomas Herbert Warren
