= Broadcaster =

Broadcaster may refer to:

- A broadcasting organization, one responsible for audio and video content and/or their transmission
- A sports commentator on television or radio
- Broadcaster, currently known as Fender Telecaster, a solid-body electric guitar
- A broadcast spreader used in farming
- A former production company in Finland, acquired by Zodiak Media in 2004, and later discontinued.

== See also ==
- Presenter (disambiguation)
