= Majed Chergui =

Swiss and French physicist

Professor Majed Chergui
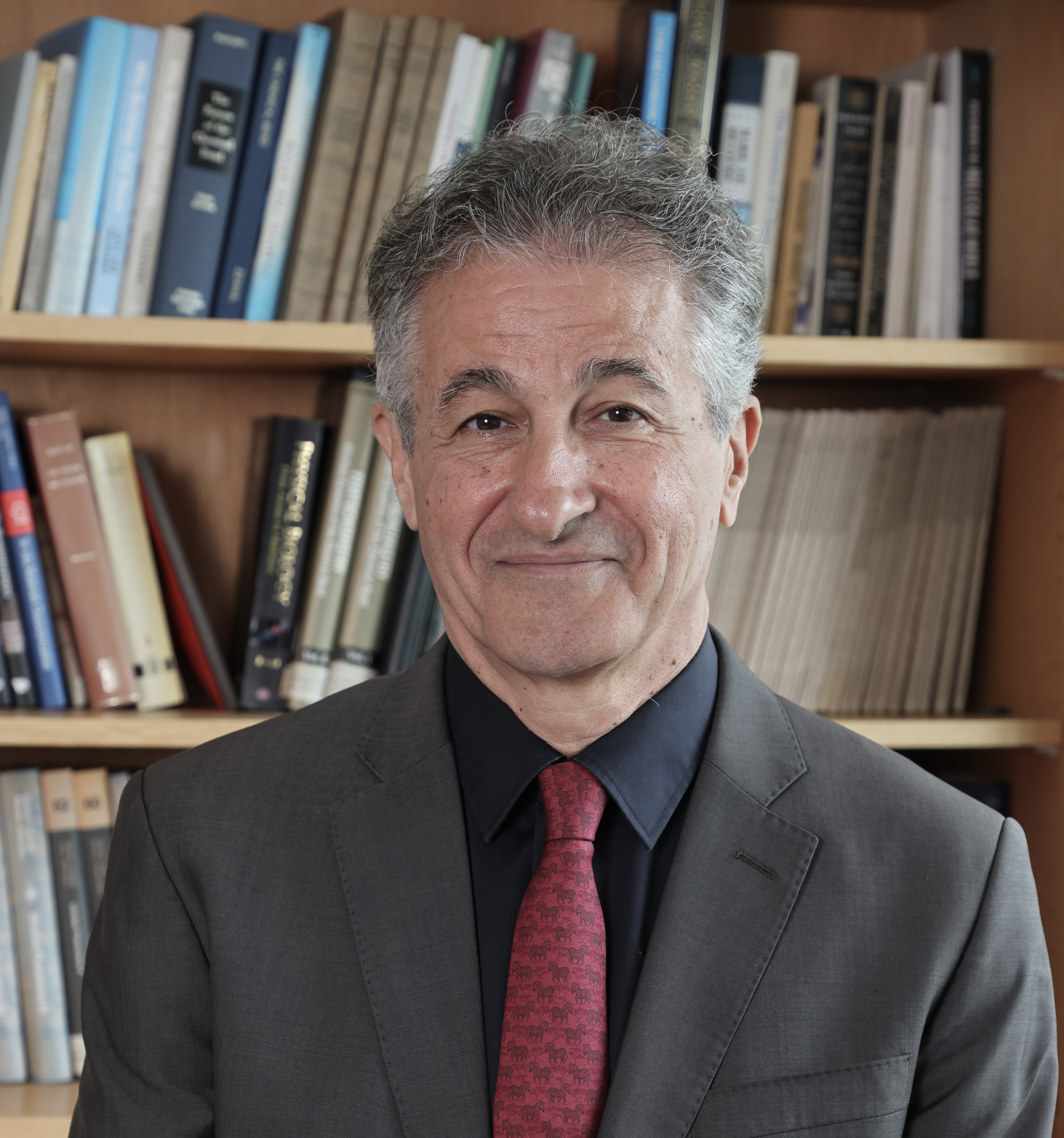
- Majed Chergui 2022 by Alain Herzog
- Born: 1956 (age 69–70); Casablanca, Morocco
- Known for: Ultrafast X-ray spectroscopy Ultrafast 2-dimensional Chiral spectroscopy
- Awards: Optica (society)William F. Meggers Award 2026; The Great Arab Minds Award 2025 in Natural Sciences; Rognlie Award 2023 (American Crystallographic Association); Ahmed Zewail Award 2021 (American Chemical Society); Liversidge Award 2019 (Royal Society of Chemistry); Earle K. Plyler Award 2015 (American Physical Society); Edward Stern Prize 2015 (International X-ray Absorption Society); Khwarizmi International Award; Humboldt Research Award 2010; Kuwait Prize for Physics 2009

Academic background
- Education: Physics; Mathematics
- Alma mater: University of London; Paris-Sud University, Orsay; Université Paris Nord, Villetaneuse
- Doctoral advisor: Jacques Bauche
- Other advisors: Venkataraman Chandrasekharan; Nikolaus Schwentner

Academic work
- Discipline: Physics
- Sub-discipline: Atomic physics Molecular physics
- Institutions: EPFL (École Polytechnique Fédérale de Lausanne); Elettra Sincrotrone Trieste
- Website: https://www.epfl.ch/labs/lsu/ https://www.elettra.eu/

Majed Chergui (born 1956 in Casablanca) is a Swiss and French physicist specialized in ultrafast dynamics of light-induced processes. He is an Honorary professor of the EPFL (École Polytechnique Fédérale de Lausanne) and the Université de Lausanne. He was founding director of the Lausanne Centre for Ultrafast Science (LACUS) at the EPFL between 2016 and 2021.

He is now project leader at Elettra-Sincrotrone Trieste (Italy).

== Early life and education ==
Majed Chergui was born in Casablanca (Morocco) in 1956 and grew up in Algeria and Lebanon. He received his BSc in Physics and Mathematics from Chelsea College (now King's college, University of London) in 1977, his master's degree in atomic and molecular physics from the Université Paris-Sud (Orsay, now Université Paris-Saclay) in 1978 and his PhD from the same university in 1981. In 1986, he received his Habilitation under the supervision of Venkataraman Chandrasekharan at the Université Sorbonne Paris Nord. Between 1987 and 1989, he was an Alexander von Humboldt fellow in the group of Professor Nikolaus Schwentner at the Institute for Experimental Physics of the Free University of Berlin.

== Career ==
M. Chergui was assistant Lecturer of Physics at the Université Sorbonne Paris Nord between 1980 and 1982, then research assistant at the Centre National de la Recherche Scientifique (CNRS) between 1982 and 1989. From 1987 till 1993, he worked at the Institute for Experimental Physics of the Free University of Berlin, first as a postdoc, then as senior research assistant. In 1993 he was appointed full professor of Experimental Condensed Matter Physics at the University of Lausanne, where he stayed until 2003, to move to the Ecole Polytechnique Fédérale de Lausanne (EPFL) as Professor of Chemistry and Physics and head of the Laboratory of Ultrafast Spectroscopy at EPFL's School of Basic Sciences. He founded the Lausanne Centre for Ultrafast Science (LACUS) at the EPFL in 2016 and was its director until 2021. In 2022, he retired and became Honorary Professor of the EPFL and group leader at the Elettra Sincrotrone Trieste (Italy).

He has been Editor-in-Chief of the journal Chemical Physics between 2009 and 2014. He then founded the journal "Structural Dynamics" (AIP Publishing) and was its Editor-in-Chief between 2014 and 2020.

He is mostly known for pioneering developments in ultrafast (picosecond-femtosecond) X-ray spectroscopies, and ultrafast multidimensional deep-ultraviolet spectroscopy, which he utilised to solve scientific questions in Physical (Bio)Chemistry and in Materials Science.

== Honours and awards ==
- Optica William F. Meggers Award 2026
- The Great Arab Minds Award 2025 in Natural Sciences
- Rognlie Award of the American Crystallographic Association (ACA) 2023
- Winner of the European Research Council (ERC) Advanced Grant 2022
- Ahmed Zewail Award in Ultrafast Science and Technology 2021, American Chemical Society.
- Liversidge Award 2019, Royal Society of Chemistry.
- Khwarizmi International Award.
- Winner of the European Research Council (ERC) Advanced Grant 2016
- Edward Stern Prize for Lifetime Achievements 2015 (International X-ray Absorption Society)
- Earle K. Plyler Award 2015 (American Physical Society)
- Humboldt Research Award 2010 (Germany)
- Kuwait Prize for Physics 2009 (Kuwait)
- Rammal Medal 2007 (Euroscience Foundation, Strasbourg)
- Bronze Medal of the CNRS 1982

He is also Fellow of:

the Royal Society of Chemistry (RSC) 2014 (UK), the European Physical Society (EPS) 2015, the American Physical Society (APS) 2015 (USA), The Optical Society of America 2016 (USA), American Crystallographic Association (ACA) 2018 (USA), the European Academy of Sciences (EurASc) 2021, The World Academy of Sciences (TWAS) 2022, as well as Foreign Correspondent of the Spanish Royal Academy of Sciences since 2018.
