= 24 Hours (TV programme) =

- Genre: News and Current affairs
- Created by: BBC
- Presented by: Cliff Michelmore; Kenneth Allsop; Michael Barratt; Robert McKenzie; David Dimbleby
- Country of origin: United Kingdom
- Original language: English

Production
- Editors: Derrick Amoore; Tony Whitby; Anthony Smith
- Running time: 30 minutes (approx)

Original release
- Network: BBC1
- Release: 4 October 1965 – 14 July 1972

24 Hours or Twenty-Four Hours is a long-running, late-evening, weekdaily news magazine programme that aired on BBC1. It focused on analysis and criticism of current affairs, and featured in-depth short documentary films that set the style for current-affairs magazine programmes. 24 Hours launched on 4 October 1965 and focused on investigative journalism. The programme's main presenter was Cliff Michelmore.

== History ==
The programme brought together the production teams from two BBC television programmes: Gallery, a weekly political programme, and Tonight, an early-evening magazine programme. The original editors were Tony Whitby from Tonight and Derrick Amoore from Gallery, and it later came to be led by Anthony Smith.

Presenter Cliff Michelmore was the first lead anchor for 24 Hours. With him in the studio were Kenneth Allsop, Michael Barratt and Robert McKenzie, a professor of politics at the London School of Economics (LSE). Towards the end of its run David Dimbleby became the main presenter.

== Style ==
24 Hours was conceived with the intention of being very different from other current affairs programmes at the time. Critical to the point of confrontational, it abandoned the orthodox reverential rules of engagement with politicians and took a tougher, more modern approach to interviews. 24 Hours used a combination of panel discussions and studio debates, usually with an invited "expert" audience. The programme also featured filmed items or "packages" presented by its reporters Michael Parkinson, Fyfe Robertson, Michael Aspel, Julian Pettifer, Bernard Falk and David Jessel, among others. It helped establish an approach to television current affairs, and is in many ways the forerunner to BBC Two's present-day current affairs flagship Newsnight.

Production paperwork, Radio Times and BBC Archive library all list the title "Twenty-Four Hours" in words, but the programme's logo used numerals: "24 Hours".

== Scheduling ==
The programme originally had a fluid start time somewhere after 10 pm. The decision to give it a fixed start time of 9:55 pm was taken in 1967 following the establishment of ITN's peak-time News at Ten programme. However, on Wednesdays 24 Hours would begin at 10:20 pm "in order that The Wednesday Play may begin ... and run its full 75 minutes."

Huw Wheldon, the then BBC Controller of Programmes, said that 24 Hours "has become such a valuable part of our coverage of national and international affairs, that we feel we must give it a regular and predictable placing. David Attenborough ... who wants to put his BBC2 programmes on in such a way as to provide real choice for viewers, is driven mad by Twenty-Four Hours which has had to keep jumping about all over the place. Now we've got Twenty-Four Hours fixed at five-to-ten, we can handle all that!".

The run of 24 Hours ended on 14 July 1972.

== Studio presenters ==
- Kenneth Allsop
- Michael Barratt
- David Dimbleby
- Robert McKenzie
- Cliff Michelmore

== Reporters ==
- Michael Aspel
- Michael Parkinson
- Julian Pettifer
- Fyfe Robertson
