= Thomas Coveney =

Thomas Coveney, D.Med. was an Oxford college head in the 16th century.

Coveney was educated at Magdalen College, Oxford, where he trained as a physician. He was admitted to practice on 28 March 1555. He was president of Magdalen College, Oxford, from 1558 until being deprived in 1561 for not being in holy orders.
