= Thomas Baillie =

Thomas Baillie may refer to:

- Thomas Baillie (British Army officer) (1796–1863), lieutenant in the Royal Welsh Fusiliers and New Brunswick politician
- Thomas Baillie (cricketer) (1868–1934), South African cricketer
- Thomas Baillie (Royal Navy officer) (c. 1725–1802)

== See also ==
- Thomas Bailey (disambiguation)
- Thomas Bayly (disambiguation)
- Thomas Bayley (disambiguation)
