= Thomas Bailey =

Thomas or Tom Bailey may refer to:

== Sports ==
- Tom Bailey (footballer) (1888–?), English footballer
- Tom Bailey (football administrator) (1884–1965), secretary of Crewe Alexandra Football Club
- Thomas Bailey (footballer, born 1904) (1904–1983), Welsh footballer
- Thomas Bailey (American football) (born 1971), American football wide receiver
- Tom Bailey (American football) (1949–2005), American football player
- Tom Bailey (cricketer) (born 1991), English cricketer
- Tom Bailey (baseball) (born 1992), Australian baseball player

== Writers ==
- Thomas Bailey (topographer) (1785–1856), English topographer and writer
- Thomas A. Bailey (1902–1983), American historian and textbook author
- Tom Bailey (author) (born 1961), American author and editor

== Characters ==
- Tom Bailey (EastEnders), character in EastEnders
- Thomas Bailey, the father of Will Bailey, character on U.S. TV series The West Wing

== Others ==
- Thomas Bailey (priest) (died 1657), 17th century English religious controversialist
- Thomas P. Bailey (1867–1949), American educator
- Thomas Jennings Bailey (1867–1963), U.S. federal judge
- Thomas L. Bailey (1888–1946), American politician, Governor of Mississippi, 1944–1946
- Thomas D. Bailey (1897–1974), American educator
- Thomas H. Bailey (born 1936/37), American financier and founder of mutual fund Janus
- Tom Bailey (musician) (born 1954), English musician
- Tom Bailey (singer) (fl. 2015–2017), English singer and producer

== See also ==
- Thomas Baillie (disambiguation)
- Thomas Bailly, Leicester MP
- Thomas Bayley (disambiguation)
- Thomas Bayly (disambiguation)
