= Horspath =

Village in Oxfordshire, England

Coordinates: 51.738°N 1.174°W

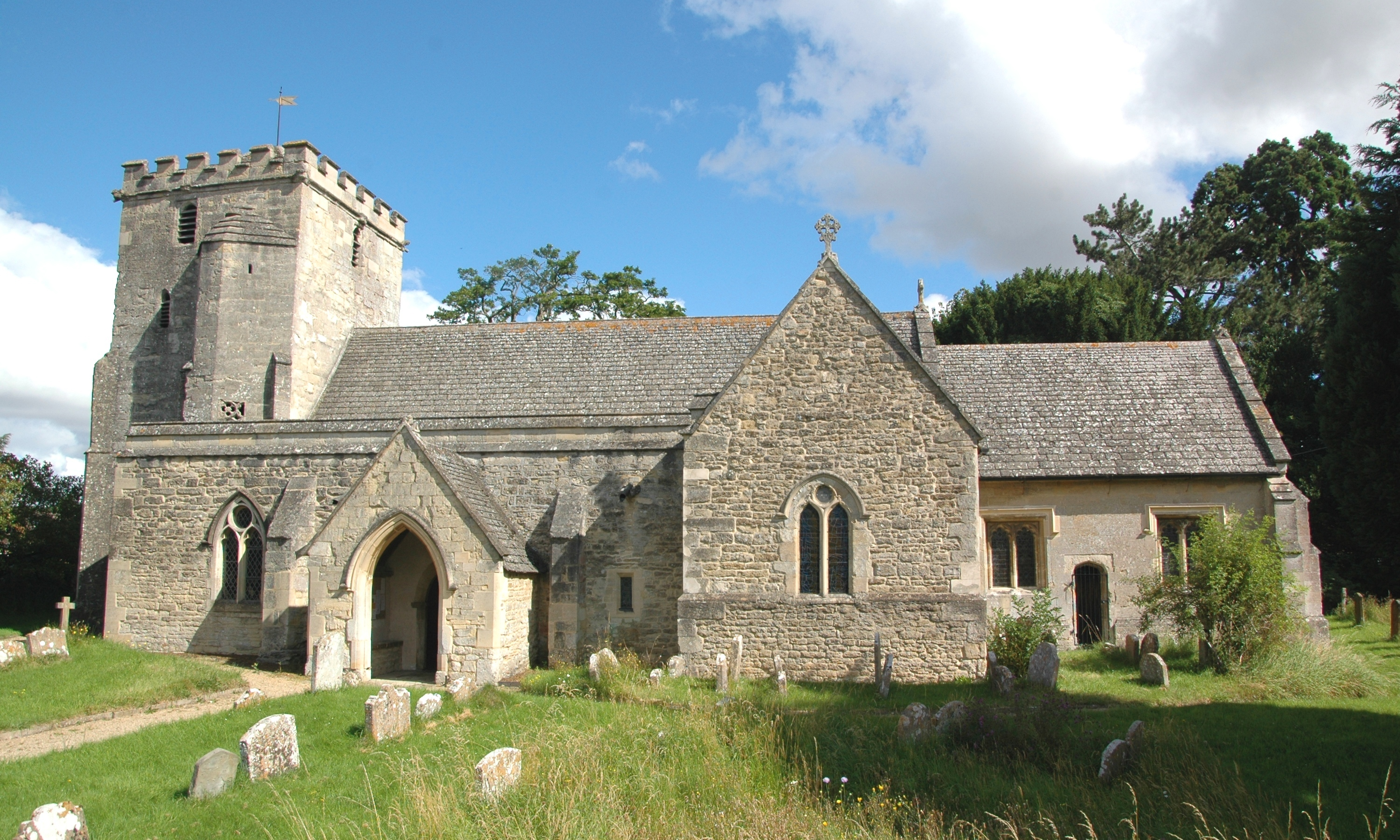
- St Giles' parish church

- Location within Oxfordshire
- Area: 4.66 km^{2} (1.80 sq mi)
- Population: 1,378 (2011 census)
  - Density: 296/km^{2} (770/sq mi)
- OS grid reference: SP5704
- Civil parish: Horspath
- District: South Oxfordshire
- Shire county: Oxfordshire
- Region: South East
- Country: England
- Sovereign state: United Kingdom
- Post town: Oxford
- Postcode district: OX33
- Dialling code: 01865
- Police: Thames Valley
- Fire: Oxfordshire
- Ambulance: South Central
- UK Parliament: Henley and Thame
- Website: Welcome to Horspath

Horspath is a village and civil parish in South Oxfordshire about 3 1/2 miles (5.6 km) east of the centre of Oxford, England. The 2011 census recorded the parish's population as 1,378.

== Archaeology ==
The parish's western boundary largely follows the course of a Roman road that linked Dorchester on Thames and Alchester Roman Town. In the Romano-British period there were pottery kilns producing Oxfordshire red/brown-slipware at Horspath Open Brasenose. Production of red slipware had begun by about 240 and continued until the end of 4th century. Production at the Horspath kiln was from the mid-3rd century until the 4th century. A wide range of red-slipped tables wares, often decorated with rouletting, stamps or white slip, was produced in the Oxfordshire potteries and widely distributed across Britain during the 3rd and 4th centuries. A Romano-British pottery mould has been found at Horspath and Roman pottery has been found on the allotments and on the common to the north of the village.

== Manor ==
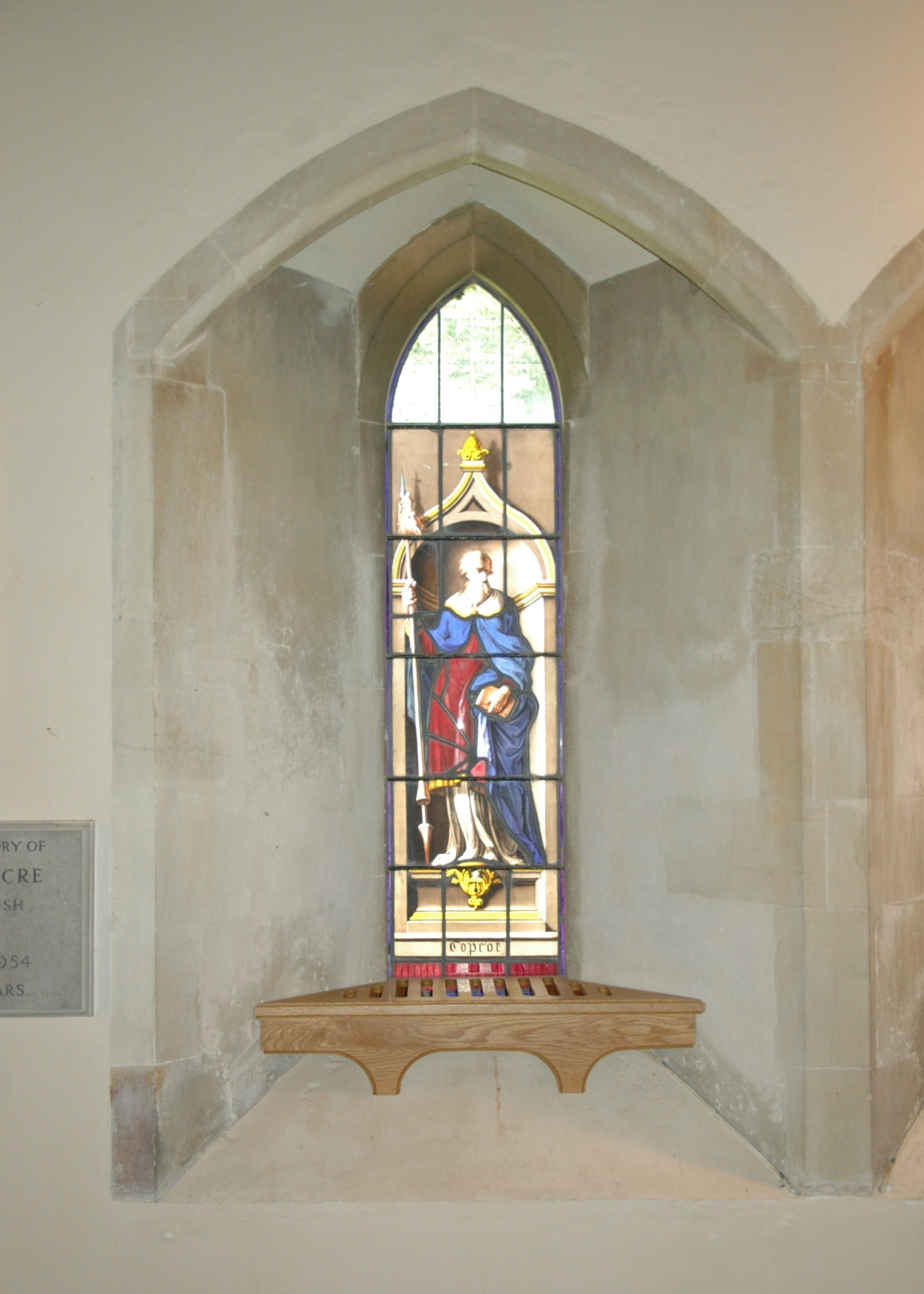
Painted glass window in St Giles' parish church presented in 1740 to commemorate the legend that John Copcot used his copy of Aristotle to kill a wild boar in Shotover Forest

In the Middle Ages there were originally two distinct hamlets: Upper or Old Horspath and Nether, Lower or Church Horspath. The old packhorse road joining the London Road through the neighbouring village of Wheatley gave the village the Old English name of "Horsepadan", which became "Horsepath." Finally, in 1912 the Parish Council changed the village's name to the unique form "Horspath." Horspath parish was once part of the medieval Royal Forest of Shotover, with dense woodland cover extending from Islip to Cuddesdon until "disafforestation" in 1660.

The Domesday Book of 1086 records that the Norman baron Roger d'Ivry, who had numerous estates in Oxfordshire, held an estate of five and a half hides at Horspath. This, along with many other d'Ivry estates, became part of the Honour of St Valery, and then passed to the Honour of Wallingford and from 1540 the Honour of Ewelme. Three Oxford University colleges: Corpus Christi, Magdalen, and Brasenose have owned land and property in the parish. A connection with Queen's College comes from the 15th century when, according to legend, student John Copcot, walking in Shotover Forest reading his Aristotle, was attacked by a wild boar. He thrust the volume down the animal's throat and 'the boar expired'. The college ceremony of carrying in the Boar's Head at Christmas is derived from this, as is the stained glass window in St Giles church, presented in 1740 by the President of Magdalen to commemorate the Copcot Legend.

The oldest part of Horspath manor house was built for William Bedyll shortly before 1513. The southern front is late Elizabethan and includes a staircase and four fireplaces built in about 1600. The eastern part of the house was designed by the architect John Malcolm and added in 1885. A ghost, "The Grey Lady", is reputed to wander the landings and garden. Killed by her husband in a quarrel, her body was placed in a priest hole. Several sightings have been reported and in December 1878 a first-class shot claimed he had fired three times at the figure, and found two bullets embedded in the wall. In 1870–72 John Marius Wilson described Horspath thus:

"HORSEPATH, a village and a parish in Headington district, Oxford. The village stands under a hill, 2 miles W by S of Wheatley railway station, and 4 ESE of Oxford. The parish also includes the hamlet of Littleworth. Post town, Wheatley, under Oxford. Acres, 1,164. Real property, £1,840. Pop., 334. Houses, 71. The manor belongs to the Earl of Macclesfield. The living is a vicarage in the diocese of Oxford. Value, £91. Patron, Magdalen College, Oxford. The church is ancient; consists of nave and chancel with a tower; and has, in its tower wall, two rude figures, said to be those of its founders."

== Church and chapel ==
=== Church of England ===
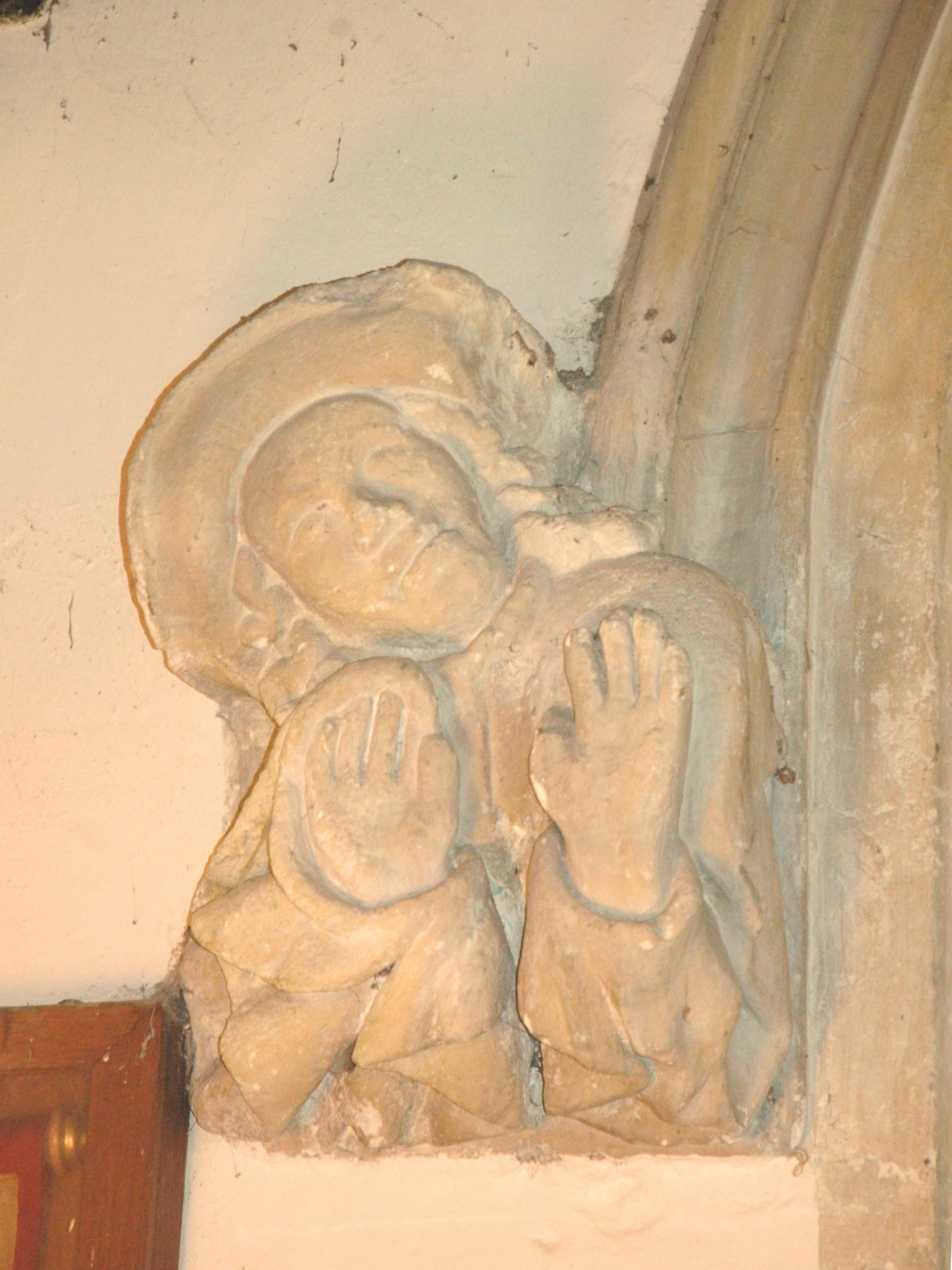
St Giles' parish church: 15th century carved stone figure of a man expressing amazement, forming the left label stop of the tower arch

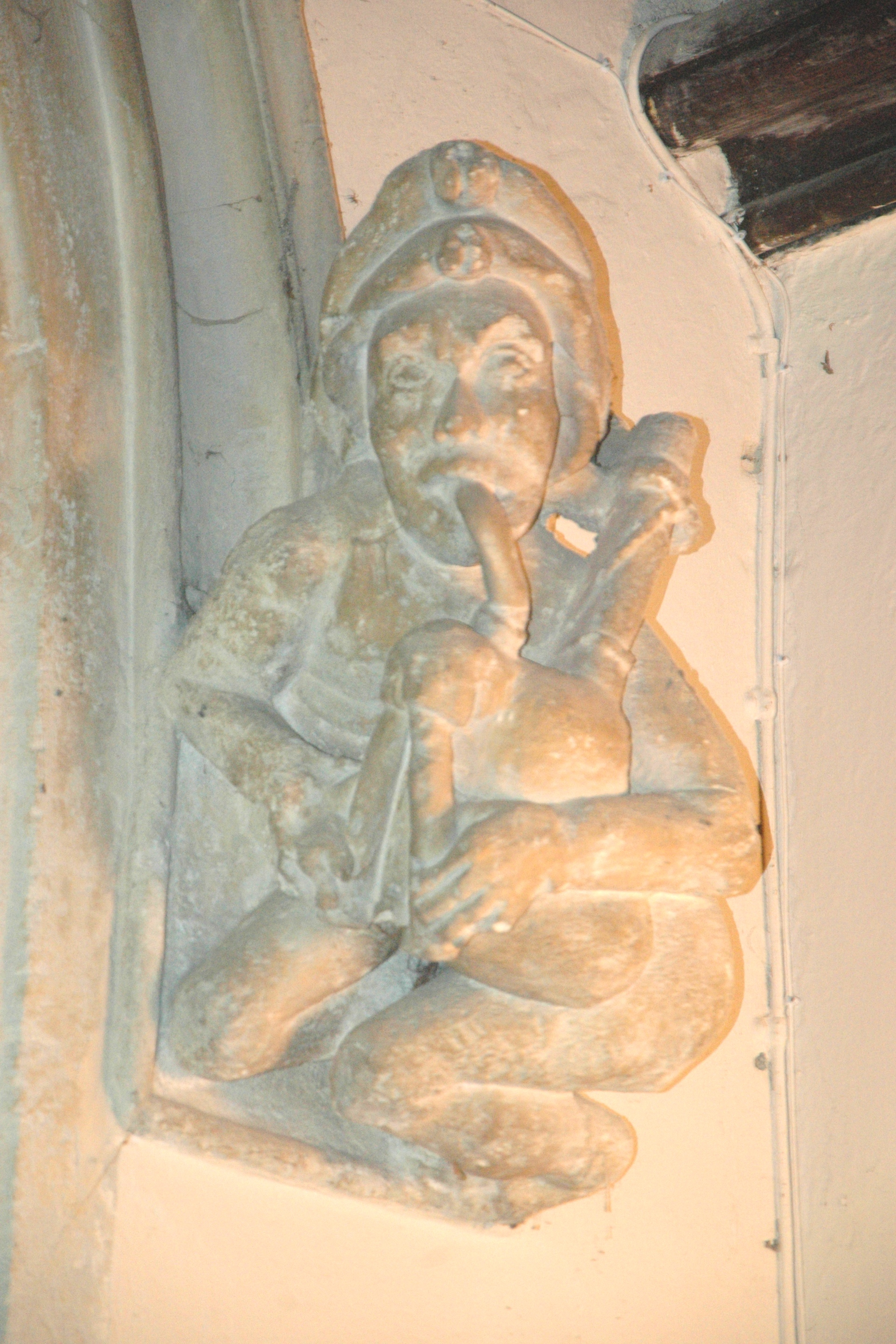
St Giles' parish church: 15th century carved stone figure of a man playing bagpipes, forming the right label stop of the tower arch

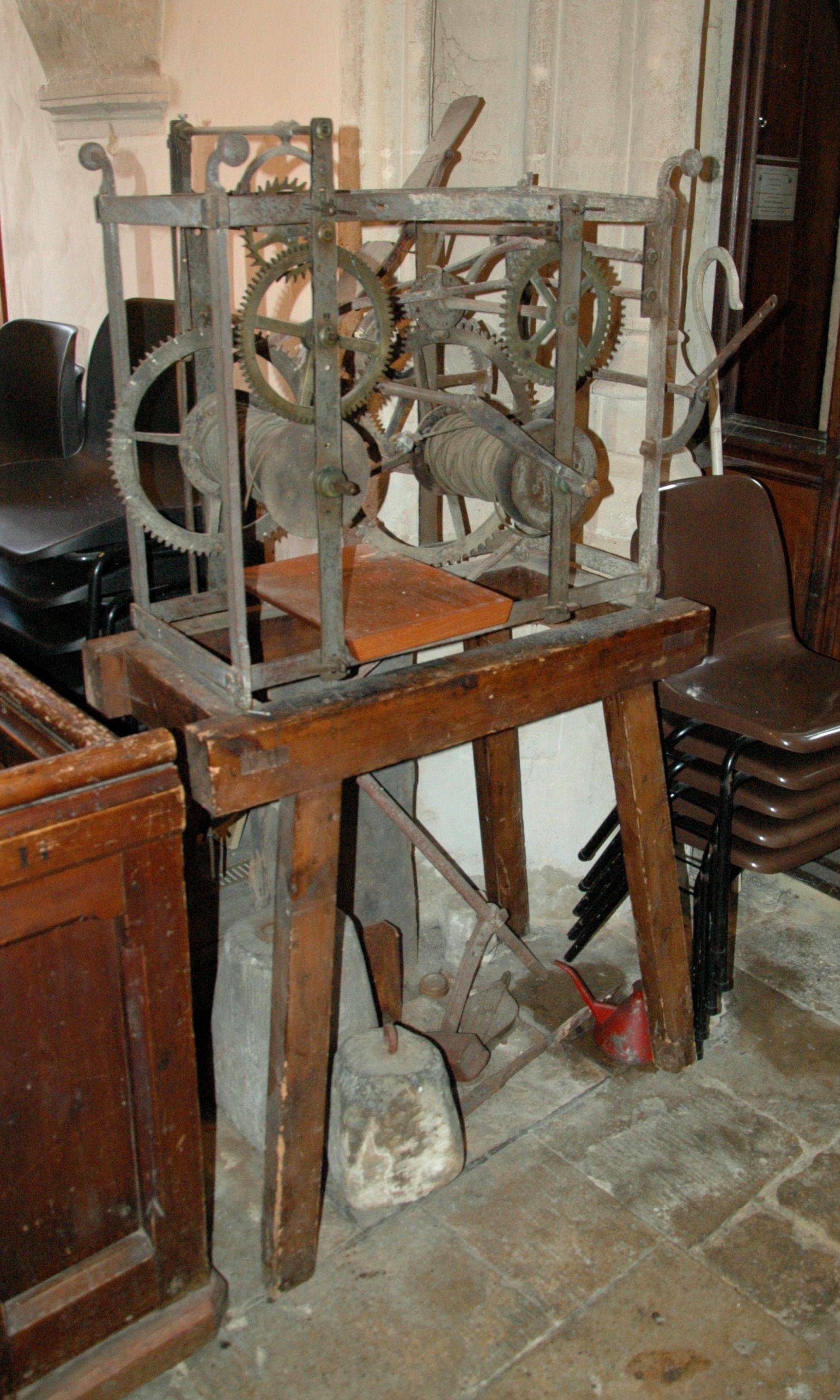
Disused turret clock now in the nave of St Giles' parish church

The Church of England parish church of Saint Giles seems to have been built late in the 12th century. The Early English Gothic south aisle, including the south door and three and a half bay south arcade date from this period. From this time the east wall of the chancel had a trio of three stepped lancet windows. The early Decorated Gothic south transept was added late in the 13th or early in the 14th century as a chantry chapel. The south porch was added late in the 14th century. Around 1400 the present west tower and tower arch were built. The tower arch features two unusual almost life-size sculptures of human figures: one playing the bagpipes and the other showing an expression of amazement. Also in the 15th century the pitch of the nave roof was greatly reduced in typical Perpendicular Gothic style. Late in the 15th century, Perpendicular Gothic windows were inserted in both sides of the chancel and the north wall of the nave. The Perpendicular Gothic piscinae in the chancel and south transept are also 15th century.

In the 18th century Magdalen College, Oxford and the Earl of Abingdon contributed to the building of a west gallery in the nave. By 1840 the east wall of the chancel was out of alignment so the chancel was demolished and rebuilt to designs by the architect HJ Underwood, who retained the Perpendicular Gothic side windows with their medieval stained glass but dispensed with the medieval roof and replaced the Early English Gothic east windows with a neo-Perpendicular one. A contemporary condemned this work as "wanton destruction". By 1849 the nave was dilapidated so in 1852 the clerestory and west gallery were removed, the north wall was rebuilt and the north transept was added. Once again Underwood was the architect. The work cost £800, of which Baker Morrell of the local Morrell brewing family and Magdalen College each paid £200. The church is a Grade II* listed building.

By 1554 St. Giles' had three bells and by the 18th century it had five. It now has a ring of six bells plus a Sanctus bell. Of the current ring, the oldest is the fourth bell, which Joseph Carter of Reading, Berkshire cast in 1602. William Yare, also of Reading, cast the tenor bell in 1611. Abraham Rudhall of Gloucester cast the second and third bells in 1718. W&J Taylor of Loughborough, who from 1821 to 1854 had a bell-foundry in Oxford, cast the fifth bell in 1838. Mears and Stainbank of the Whitechapel Bell Foundry cast the treble bell in 1866. James Wells of Aldbourne, Wiltshire cast the Sanctus bell in 1811. St Giles' has a disused turret clock without a dial, the frame of which appears to be late 17th century.

St Giles' has an Elizabethan silver chalice made in about 1569, a carved late Jacobean pulpit, and a number of monumental plaques. One of these, to James Salisbury of Bullingdon Green (who died in 1770), is elaborately decorated. Another is to the five children of Thomas and Esther Herbert, who died from a recurrence of the bubonic plague between 1686 and 1688. Esther, whose family founded New College, also died in 1688 aged 33. A ceramic statuette of St Giles made by a local potter in 1988 is in the south chapel. In 1451 the Crown granted the advowson to the Hospital of St John the Baptist outside the East Gate, Oxford. In 1456 the hospital was suppressed, and all its property granted to Magdalen College, Oxford, newly founded by William Waynflete. From then until 1950 the vicar of St Giles was always a member of the college. George Wilkynson, who was incumbent from 1483, was Dean of Divinity of the University of Oxford.

Many vicars of St Giles were distinguished fellows of the college, but some of the post-Reformation ones neglected the parish. Richard Byfield, who was incumbent from 1666, was a scholar of Hebrew. Baptist Levinz, who was incumbent from 1680 to 1682, became Bishop of Sodor and Man in 1685. George Horne, who was incumbent from 1760 to 1764, became Vice-Chancellor of the University of Oxford in 1776 and Bishop of Norwich in 1790. Edward Ellerton, who was incumbent from 1814, founded Horspath parish school and left land in the parish to fund scholarships to Magdalen College, Oxford. Frederick Bulley, who was incumbent from 1843 to 1849, became President of Magdalen College in 1855. Henry Bramley, who was incumbent from 1861 to 1869, was a hymnologist who worked with the composer Sir John Stainer.

=== Methodist ===
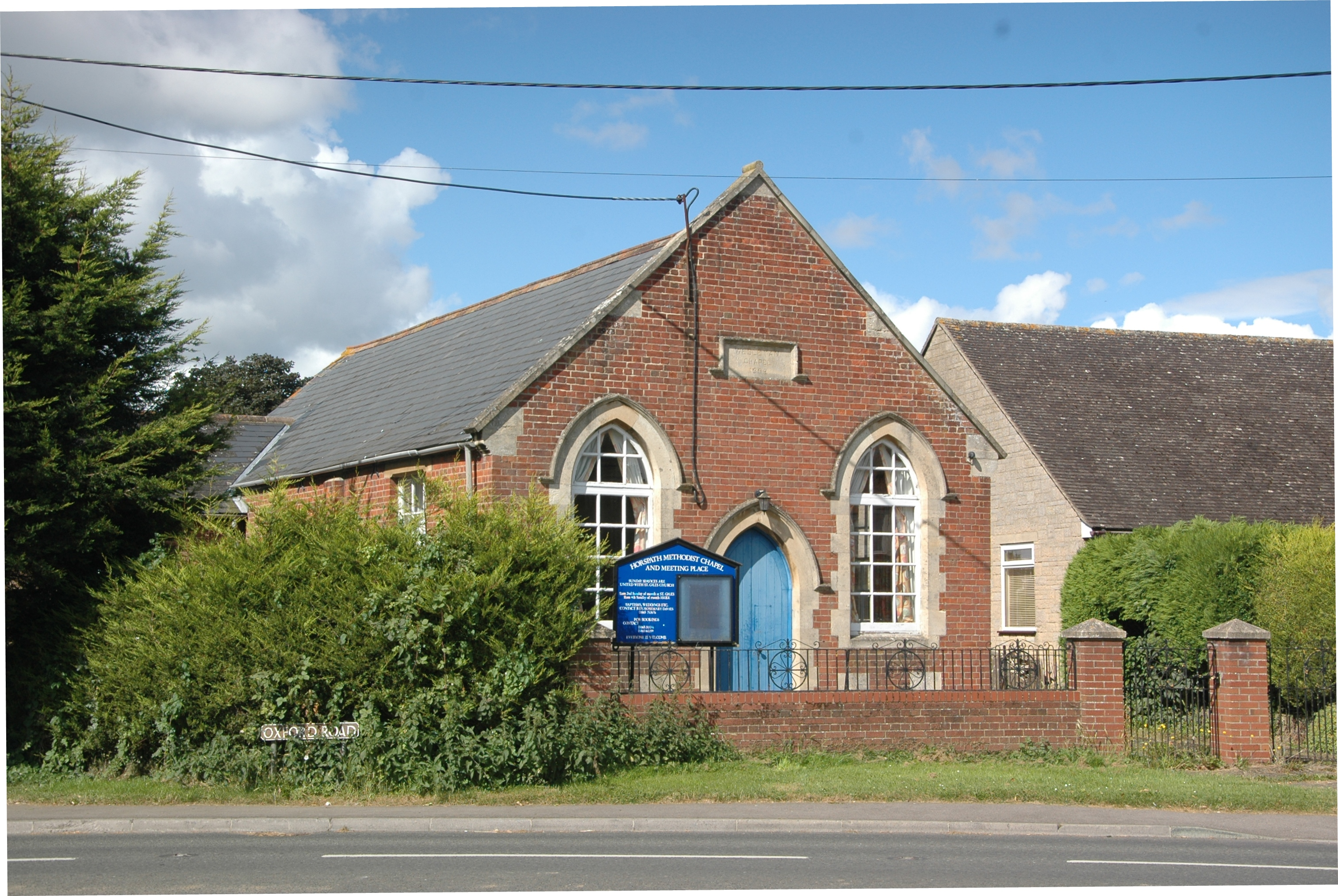
Horspath Community Hub, built as a Methodist chapel in 1871

In the 19th century a Methodist congregation developed in the village. It met in people's homes until 1871 when the current brick-built chapel just west of the village green was completed and opened. It was a member of The Oxford Methodist Circuit of the Methodist Church of Great Britain. In 2014 it ceased to be used for worship. The village community has bought the building and converted it into "Horspath Community Hub".

== Civil War ==
In the western part of the parish, between Horspath village and the Roman road, is Bullingdon Green. Some weeks after the Battle of Edgehill in 1642 the Royalists disarmed the county's trained bands here. In 1644 Sir Arthur Aston, the Royalist Governor of Oxford, was thrown from his horse and injured here when "kerveting on horseback . . . before certain ladies". Aston's successor Sir Henry Gage reviewed Royalist troops here in the presence of Charles I. As the war turned against the Crown, Parliamentary troops assembled here in 1644 under the Earl of Essex and again in 1645. In 1648 George Nicolson, vicar of St Giles, was deprived of his demyship to Magdalen College for abusing Parliamentary soldiers.

== Economic and social history ==
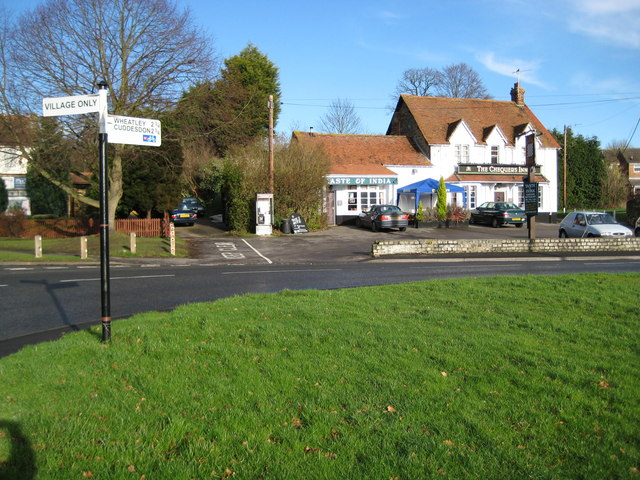
The Chequers Inn

Buildings in Horspath reflect the underlying geology, with many older houses built from rubblestone of the distinctive local Corallian limestone. Red tiles or thatch are common as roofing materials. Horspath has 15 listed buildings including farm outbuildings and a cowhouse, the manor house, the parish church, and two thatched cottages, of which there were once 17, but fire has destroyed most. In 1936 the Queen's Head public house caught fire and sparks from the thatch destroyed two cottages opposite. The pub was restored with a tiled roof, as was Shepherd's Cottage, this thatch being burnt in the mid-1970s. The Chequers Inn, although dated 1624, was built in the 19th century.

In the 19th and early 20th centuries laundresses stretched their lines across the village green and market gardeners tended their vegetables for Pembroke College, Oxford. Farmers also reared pigs for the college tables. The 1871 census recorded a population of 373, including 93 employed on the land, 14 craftsmen, 30 in other trades, a curate and two publicans. There were 12 farmers in 1841 and only two in 1990, but the village still has two publicans. The Horspath Cricket Club played its first game in 1894 against Garsington. The present pitch was created in 1924. The club has played in the Oxford Times Cherwell League, Division 1, since 2008.

Early in the 20th century there was much change with Tarmacadam roads, housing developments and mobile homes replacing farmland and manor grounds, and the loss of the elms and the village pond. In 1912 William Morris moved his car manufacturing from Oxford to larger premises in Cowley. Surveys in 1938 and 1946 recorded more than 80 Horspath villagers working at Morris Motors. Horspath's population now includes people from many occupations, including employees of what is now the BMW Mini factory.

== Wycombe Railway ==
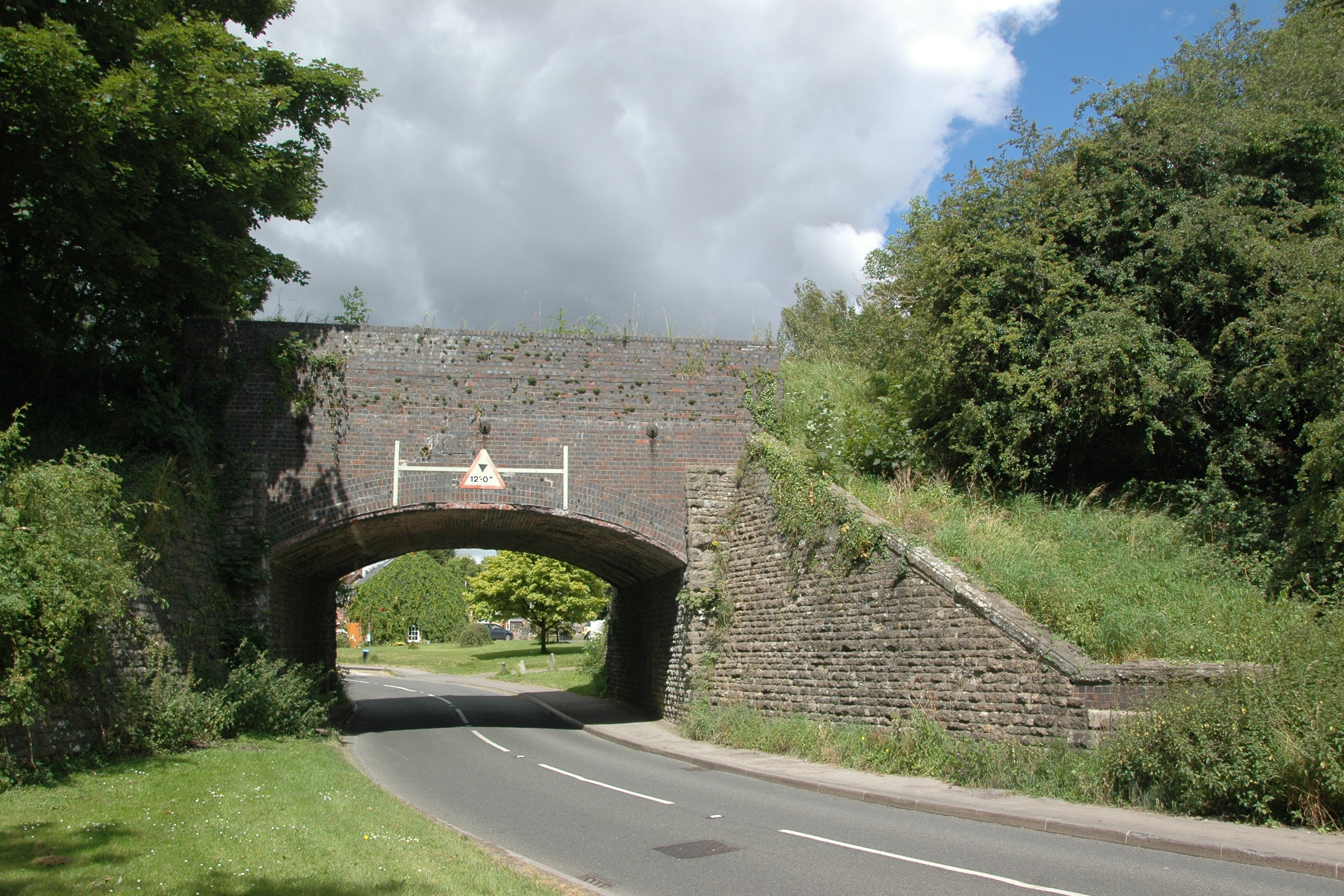
Cuddesdon Road railway bridge, which carried the Wycombe Railway 1864–1963

In 1864 the Wycombe Railway was built and opened through the parish, including the 524 yards (479 m) long Horspath Tunnel between Horspath village and the hamlet of Littleworth. It is sometimes called Wheatley Tunnel, but it is in fact entirely within Horspath parish. The Great Western Railway took over the Wycombe Railway in 1867 and opened Horspath Halt in 1908. The halt was closed in 1915 but reopened in 1933. In 1963 British Railways withdrew passenger services between Princes Risborough and Oxford and closed the halt. Horspath Tunnel is now owned by Oxfordshire County Council and is a hibernaculum for several species of bat. In 1982 Horspath Parish Council bought the disused railway cutting southwest of the tunnel, enabling community volunteers to modify it to increase its biodiversity as Horspath Parish Council Wildlife Conservation Area.

== Amenities ==
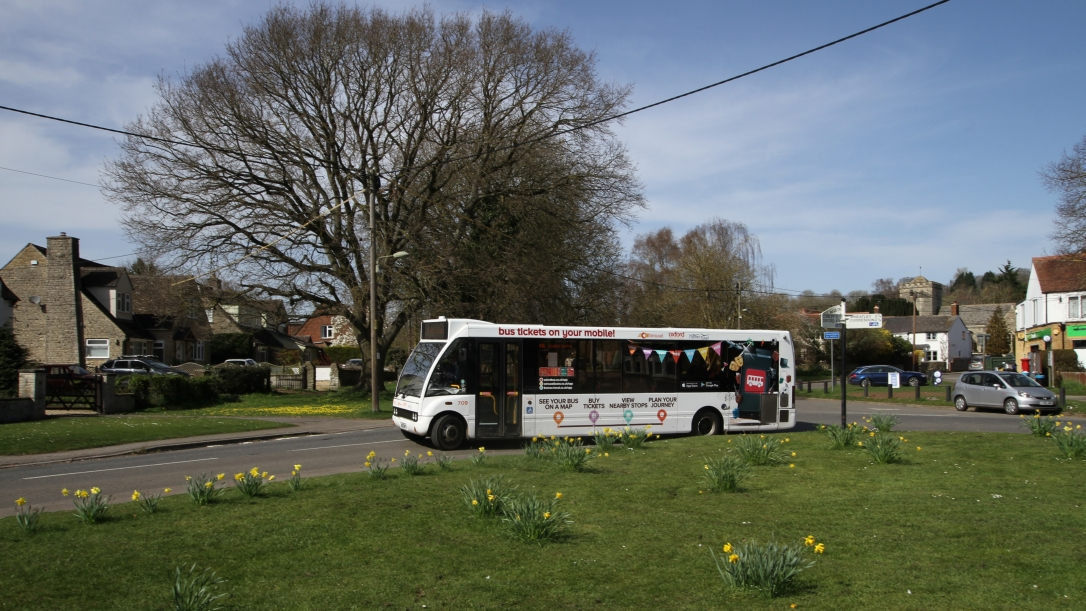
Bus 46 passing Horspath village green

Horspath has a village shop and two pubs, the Chequers and the Queen's Head. The Chequers includes a Nepalese restaurant, the Gurkha Kitchen.

Oxford Bus Company route 46 links Horspath with Oxford via Cowley and with Great Milton via Littleworth and Wheatley. Buses run hourly, seven days a week, from early morning until after midnight.

== Bibliography ==
- Anonymous (1999). The Oxfordshire Village Book. The Women's Institute.
- Beeson, CFC (1989) [1962]. Simcock, AV (ed.). Clockmaking in Oxfordshire 1400–1850 (3rd ed.). Oxford: Museum of the History of Science. p. 43. ISBN 0-903364-06-9.
- Lobel, Mary D, ed. (1957). A History of the County of Oxford. Victoria County History. Vol. 5: Bullingdon Hundred. London: Oxford University Press for the Institute of Historical Research. pp. 177–189.
- Sherwood, Jennifer; Pevsner, Nikolaus (1974). Oxfordshire. The Buildings of England. Harmondsworth: Penguin Books. pp. 655–656. ISBN 0-14-071045-0.
- Sharp, Thomas (1948). Oxford Replanned. London: The Architectural Press. pp. 58–59.
- Wilson, John Marius (1870–72). Imperial Gazetteer of England and Wales. London & Edinburgh: A Fullarton & Co.
