= Bob Herman (cricketer) =

English cricketer (born 1946)

Personal information
- Full name: Robert Stephen Herman
- Born: 30 November 1946 (age 79); Shirley, Southampton, Hampshire, England
- Batting: Right-handed
- Bowling: Right-arm fast-medium
- Relatives: Lofty Herman (father)

Domestic team information
- Years: Team
- 1965–1971: Middlesex
- 1972–1977: Hampshire
- 1972/73: Border
- 1974/75: Griqualand West
- 1978–1979: Dorset

Umpiring information
- FC umpired: 61 (1979–1982)
- LA umpired: 53 (1979–1982)

Career statistics
Competition	First-class	List A
Matches	189	132
Runs scored	1,426	237
Batting average	10.18	4.93
100s/50s	0/1	0/0
Top score	56	25
Balls bowled	30,616	6,198
Wickets	506	177
Bowling average	26.37	23.10
5 wickets in innings	14	2
10 wickets in match	0	0
Best bowling	8/42	6/42
Catches/stumpings	74/–	22/–
- Source: Cricinfo, 21 September 2026

Robert Stephen Herman (born 30 November 1946) is a former English cricketer who played County Cricket for Middlesex from 1965 to 1971 and Hampshire from 1972 to 1977. He played in South Africa for Border in 1972/3 and for Griqualand West in 1974/5. He also played in the Minor Counties Championship for Dorset in 1978 and 1979.

Between 1979 and 1982, he umpired 61 first-class cricket and 53 List A cricket matches. He then took up teaching.

Herman was born at Southampton in Hampshire. His father, Lofty Herman, also played for Hampshire.
