= Herbert Warren =

British academic (1853–1930)

Sir Thomas Herbert Warren KCVO
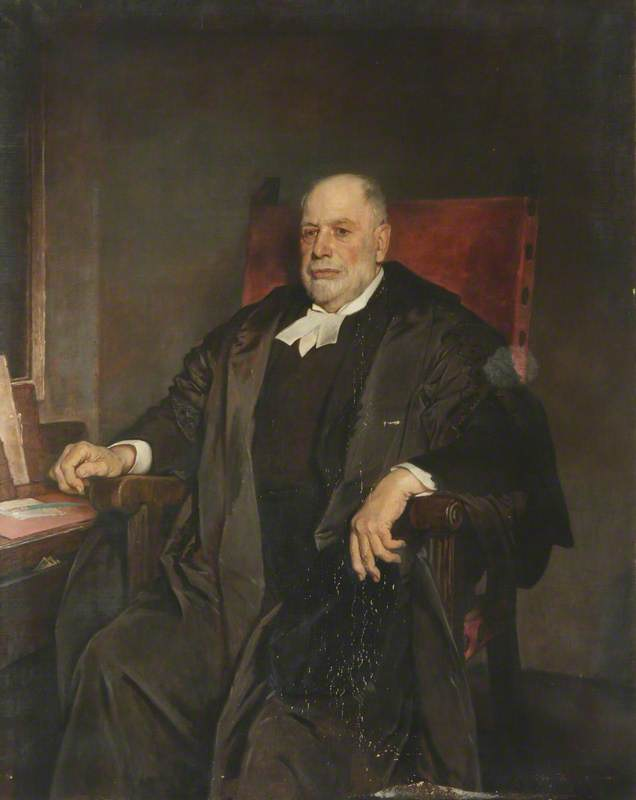
- Sir Thomas Herbert Warren (1853–1930), President (1885–1928), by Glyn Philpot

President of Magdalen College, Oxford
- In office 1885–1928
- Preceded by: Frederick Bulley
- Succeeded by: George Gordon

Vice-Chancellor of Oxford University
- In office 1906–1910
- Preceded by: William Walter Merry
- Succeeded by: Charles Buller Heberden

Oxford Professor of Poetry
- In office 1911–1916
- Preceded by: Andrew Cecil Bradley
- Succeeded by: Gilbert Murray

Personal details
- Born: October 21, 1853 Bristol, England
- Died: June 9, 1930 (aged 76) Oxford, England
- Spouse: Mary Isabel Brodie (m. 1886)
- Parent(s): Algernon William Warren, Cecil Thomas

Sir Thomas Herbert Warren, KCVO (21 October 1853 – 9 June 1930) was a British academic and administrator who was president of Magdalen College, Oxford for 43 years (1885–1928) and vice-chancellor of Oxford University (1906–10).

In his teens during the late 1860s, Warren played rugby football for the newly opened Clifton College. During the 1870s, he earned a scholarship which allowed him to enter Warren Balliol College, Oxford. He played rugby football for both the college and the university. As an academic, he gained a number of international honours. He received the Legion of Honour from France and the Order of the Crown of Italy.

== Early life and education ==
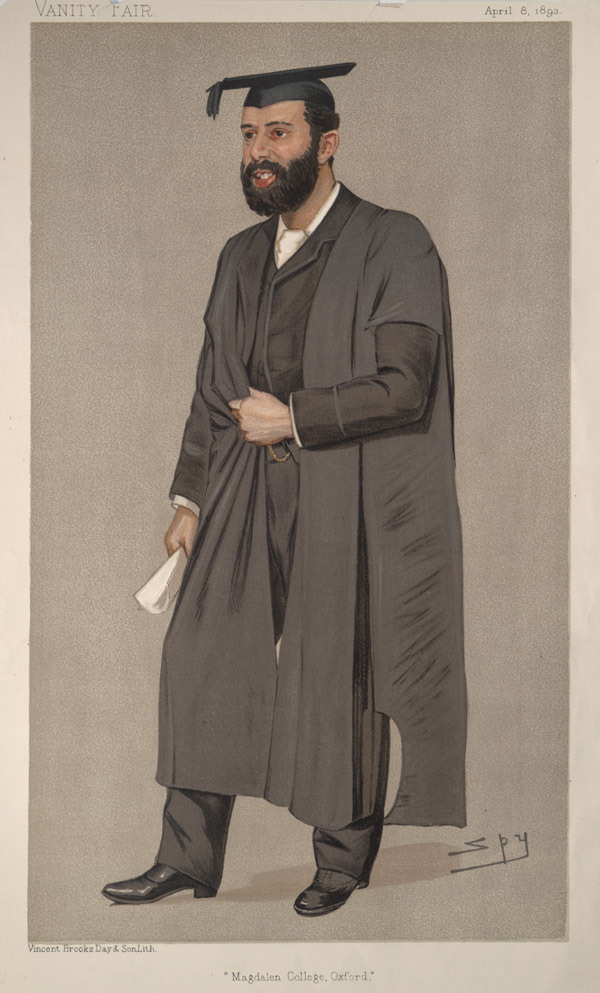
"Magdalen College, Oxford". Caricature by Spy published in Vanity Fair in 1893.

Warren was born in Bristol, the eldest son of magistrate Algernon William Warren, JP, and Cecil Thomas, both born in Carmarthenshire, Wales. Architect Edward Prioleau Warren was his younger brother. His sister, Anna Letitia Warren, studied at Somerville College, Oxford (then Somerville Hall), as one of its first 12 students. At age 15, he entered the newly opened Clifton College, under its first headmaster John Percival. At Clifton, he played rugby and became head boy.

After earning a scholarship, Warren entered Balliol College, Oxford, in 1872. He excelled as a scholar, earning numerous classical distinctions, including firsts in Moderations and Lit. Hum., the Hertford and Craven Scholarships, and the Gaisford Prize for Greek Verse (1875). He was the college librarian in 1875-6. He also played rugby football for the college and the university. He was elected a Fellow of Magdalen in 1877, and became Classical Tutor in 1878.

== Career ==
Warren was president of Magdalen College, Oxford, from 1885 to 1928, and served as vice-chancellor of Oxford University from 1906 to 1910 and as Oxford Professor of Poetry 1911–16.

Warren published By Severn Sea and Other Poems in 1897 and The Death of Virgil in 1907. In 1913, he published a study of his friend, the poet Robert Bridges.

He retired in 1928 after spending more than four decades as a significant figure at the university.

For many years the President of Magdalen had been about the best known figure in Oxford. His long tenure of his office, 43 years, his great experience of University business, his wide. circle of friends and acquaintances both in Oxford and in the outer world, the many spheres of his interests, and the versatility of his talents, all contributed to make him conspicuous, and many generations of undergraduates, whose acquaintance with heads of houses is not large, will reckon 'the Pre' among their lasting recollections of Oxford.

— The Times, 10 June 1930

== Honours ==
Warren was appointed a Knight Commander of the Royal Victorian Order in 1914 after the Prince of Wales left Magdalen.

He earned honorary degrees of LL.D. from the University of Birmingham and D.Litt. from the University of Bristol. He was made an honorary D.C.L. at Oxford. He also received the Legion of Honour from France and the Order of the Crown of Italy.

== Personal life ==
In 1886, Warren married Mary Isabel Brodie, youngest daughter of Sir Benjamin Collins Brodie, 2nd Baronet.

He died in 1930 in Oxford and was buried at Holywell Cemetery.

Academic offices
Preceded by Frederic Bulley	President of Magdalen College, Oxford; 1885–1928	Succeeded by George Gordon
Preceded by William Walter Merry	Vice-Chancellor of Oxford University; 1906–1910	Succeeded by Charles Buller Heberden
