= Charles Buller Heberden =

English classical scholar and academic administrator

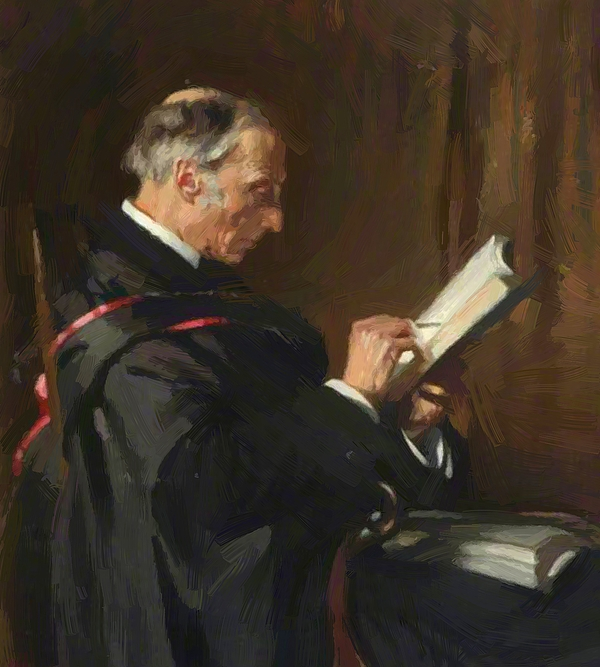

Vice-Chancellor of the University of Oxford
- In office 1910–1913
- Preceded by: Thomas Herbert Warren
- Succeeded by: Thomas Banks Strong

Personal details
- Born: 14 December 1849
- Died: 30 May 1921 (aged 71)
- Education: Balliol College, Oxford

Charles Buller Heberden (14 December 1849 – 30 May 1921) was an English classical scholar and academic administrator. He was principal of Brasenose College, Oxford (1889–1920) and served as vice-chancellor of Oxford University.

== Life ==
He was born at Broadhembury in Devon, the son of the Rev. William Heberden. He was educated at Harrow School and Balliol College, Oxford, from 1868, where he was a contemporary of Benjamin Jowett.

Heberden edited a book on the history of Brasenose College, published in 1909. He funded a Harrow Scholarship for Brasenose College in 1916 and an Organ Scholarship in 1921 at his death. He also left £1,000 to the university, which was used for the Coin Room at the Ashmolean Museum.

He was on the governing body of Abingdon School from 1914 to 1921.

Heberden is buried in Holywell Cemetery, Oxford.

Academic offices
Preceded by Albert Watson	Principal of Brasenose College, Oxford; 1889–1920	Succeeded by Charles Henry Sampson
Preceded by Thomas Herbert Warren	Vice-Chancellor of Oxford University; 1910–1913	Succeeded by Thomas Strong
