= John Rogers (academic) =

English academic (1651–1703)

John Rogers (12 August 1651 – 10 February 1703) was an English academic.

Rogers was born at Leatherhead and was educated at Magdalen College, Oxford, of which college he was a fellow from 1675 to 1701. He was Magdalen's President from 1701 until his death in Oxford.
