= Liversidge Award =

Award granted by the Royal Society of Chemistry

The Liversidge Award recognizes outstanding contributions to physical chemistry. Named for the chemist Archibald Liversidge, it is awarded by the Faraday Division of the Royal Society of Chemistry.

In 2020 the Liversidge Award was merged with the Bourke Award to create the Bourke-Liversidge Award.

== Winners ==
The following have won the Liversidge Award:

2019	Majed Chergui
2017	Warren S. Warren
2016	Peter Bruce
2014	Michael Ashfold
2012	Anthony Legon
2010	David Clary
2009/10	Richard Catlow
2007/08	John Philip Simons
2005/06	Brian E. Mann
2003/04	Robin Clark
2001/02	Ian William Murison Smith
1999/00	Peter Edwards
1997/98	David Anthony King
1995/96	John Anthony Osborn
1993/94	Richard N. Dixon
1991/92	James Johnson Turner
1989/90	Roger Parsons
1987/88	Bernard L. Shaw
1985/86	Ronald Harry Ottewill
1983/84	Norman Greenwood
1981/82	David W. Turner
1979/80	Robert Williams
1977/78	John Shipley Rowlinson
1975/76	Cyril Clifford Addison
1973/74	Ronald P. Bell
1971/72	Joseph Chatt
1969/70	George Porter
1967/68	Ronald Nyholm
1965/66	Edmund John Bowen
1963/64	John Stuart Anderson
1961/62	Cecil Edwin Henry Bawn
1959/60	Alfred Ubbelohde
1957/58	Ronald Norrish
1955/56	Edgar William Richard Steacie
1954	Harry Julius Emeleus
1951	Harry Melville
1948	Linus Pauling
1946	Harold Urey
1945	Eric Rideal
1943	Samuel Sugden
1941	Nevil Sidgwick
1939	Cyril Hinshelwood
1936	Friedrich Paneth
1935	Robert Whytlaw-Gray
1932	Francis William Aston
1930	William Arthur Bone
1929	Herbert Freundlich
1928	Frederick George Donnan

== See also ==
- List of chemistry awards
