= Dinah Rose =

British barrister

Dinah Rose KC
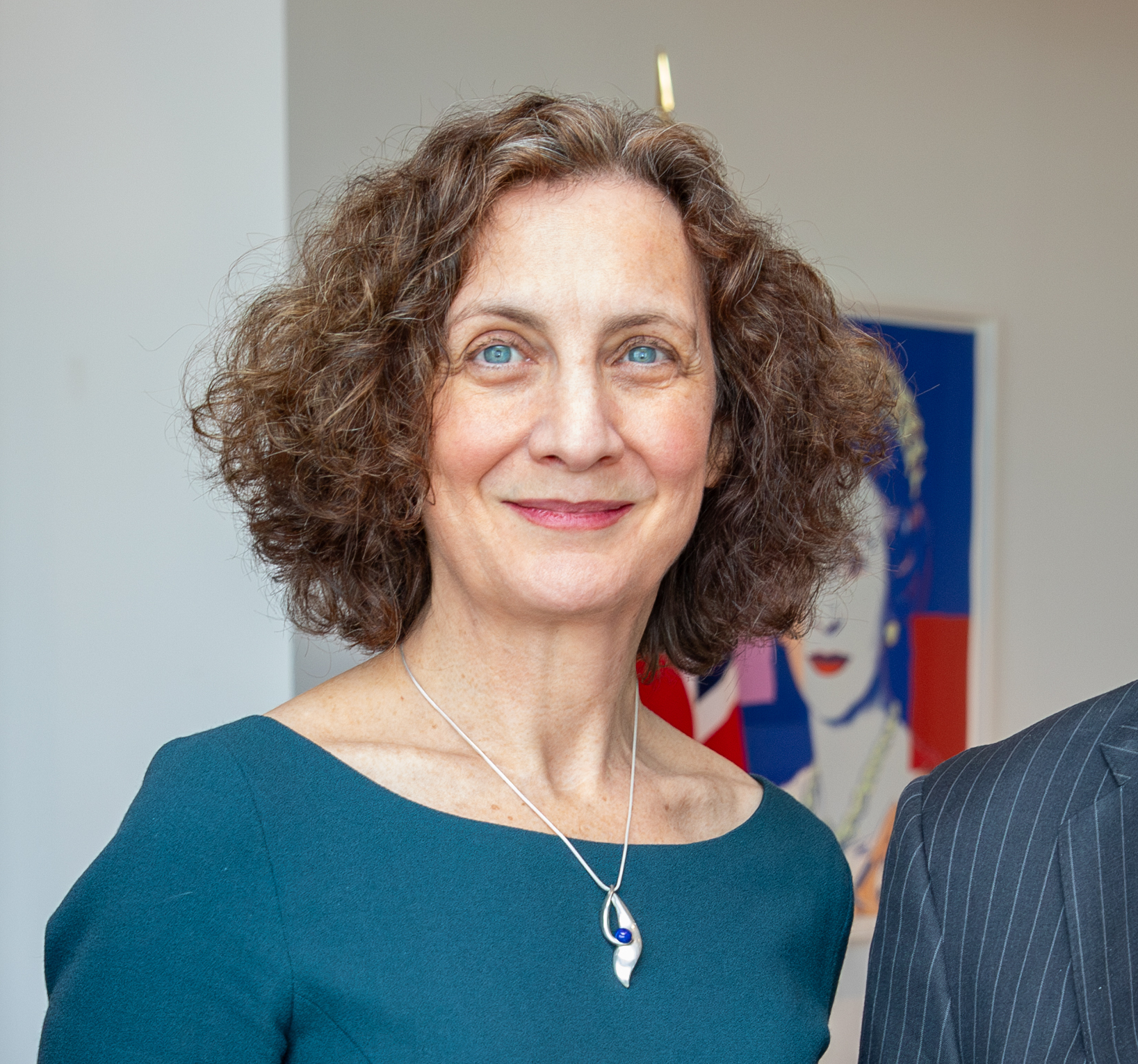
- Rose in 2024

President of Magdalen College, Oxford
- Incumbent
- Assumed office 1 September 2020
- Preceded by: David Clary

Personal details
- Born: Dinah Gwen Lison Rose; 16 July 1965 (age 61)
- Education: City of London School for Girls
- Alma mater: Magdalen College, Oxford; City University
- Profession: Barrister

Dinah Gwen Lison Rose KC (born 16 July 1965) is a British barrister. She has been President of Magdalen College, Oxford since 2020. A member of Blackstone Chambers, she was named Barrister of the Year in The Lawyer Awards 2009. In 2016, she was appointed a Deputy Judge of the High Court.

== Early life and education ==
Rose was born on 16 July 1965, and was educated at City of London School for Girls. She studied modern history at Magdalen College, Oxford, and law at City University.

== Career ==
=== Legal career ===
She was called to the bar at Gray's Inn in 1989, and took silk in 2006. In a July 2009 interview with The Lawyer, she referred to Lord Lester QC as a mentor and described Lord Pannick QC as a huge influence.

==== Notable cases ====
She has appeared in many high-profile cases, including representing "extraordinary rendition" victim Binyam Mohamed at his Court of Appeal hearing.

Rose worked on the judicial review of the Attorney General's decision to drop the investigation into alleged bribes of Saudi officials by BAE Systems.

Rose represented the family of a child who had been denied a place at the prominent Jewish comprehensive school, JFS, because his mother was not recognised as Jewish by the Office of the Chief Rabbi. The Supreme Court of the United Kingdom ruled that the denial of a place constituted unlawful race discrimination.

She appeared for Julian Assange in Assange v Swedish Prosecution Authority before the Supreme Court of the United Kingdom, in his unsuccessful appeal against extradition to Sweden.

It was announced in October 2012 that Rose had been appointed by the BBC to investigate its culture and policies in relation to sexual harassment and bullying, following the Jimmy Savile sexual abuse scandal. Respect at Work, for which 930 employees were interviewed, was published at the beginning of May 2013. Rose and her team found 37 cases of alleged sexual harassment by 35 persons between April 2006 and November 2012, but said cases of bullying were much more common, and were often not properly investigated by BBC management. Rose said in June that a "very troubling" atmosphere existed between staff and their superiors at the BBC.

=== Politics ===
In March 2013, Rose ended her party membership of the Liberal Democrats in protest at Nick Clegg's support for the coalition government's justice and security bill describing it as a "betrayal of the party's guiding principles".

=== Presidency at Magdalen College ===
In February 2020, she was elected President of Magdalen College, Oxford, in succession to Sir David Clary: she is the first woman to hold the position. She took up the post in September 2020, becoming the 43rd President of the college.

==== Cayman Islands case ====
In January 2021, Rose was criticised by former Justice of the Constitutional Court of South Africa and Oxford alumnus Edwin Cameron for acting for the Cayman Islands government in a case opposing the legalisation of same-sex marriage. This was followed by mixed reactions within the student body, academia and the legal industry.

Whilst Magdalen College's undergraduate body passed a motion affirming its support for her and rejecting calls for her to resign, the university-wide LGBTQ+ Society and African & Caribbean Society released statements condemning what they termed a conflict of interest between her role as president and her role as a barrister.

In May 2023, The Times newspaper apologised to Rose and agreed to pay her damages and her legal costs in respect of an article in the newspaper which suggested that she had not had a professional obligation to take the case on behalf of the Cayman Islands government, under the cab-rank rule.

== See also ==
- Uber BV v Aslam (2016) worker rights case, appealed to EAT

Academic offices
Preceded by David Clary	President of Magdalen College, Oxford; 2020 to present	Incumbent
