= James Riddell (scholar) =

English classical scholar (1823–1866)

James Riddell (1823–1866) was an English classical scholar.

== Life ==
Born on 8 June 1823, he was the eldest son of James Riddell (1796–1878), rector of Easton, Hampshire, by Dorothy, daughter of John Foster, of Leicester Grange, Warwickshire. After spending seven years at Mr. Browne's school at Cheam, Surrey, Riddell entered Shrewsbury School in 1838 as a pupil of Benjamin Hall Kennedy. He gained a scholarship at Balliol College, Oxford, his father's old college, in November 1840, and, leaving Shrewsbury as head boy in 1841, he began residence in Oxford in the Michaelmas term of that year. He was placed in the first class in literæ humaniores with Thomas Arnold and Goldwin Smith. He was elected Fellow of Balliol, serving his college as lecturer or tutor till his death.

He was classical examiner in 1858–9, classical moderator in 1865–6, and senior proctor and select preacher in 1862. He died at Tunbridge Wells on 14 September 1866.

== Works ==
Riddell was invited by the delegates of the Oxford University Press to edit the Odyssey for their series; and Benjamin Jowett, for an edition of Plato, assigned to him the Apology, Crito, Phædo, and Symposium. These works were left incomplete. His commentary on Odyssey, i.–xii., was completed by his pupil William Walter Merry (Clarendon Press, 1st edit. 1876). Of his work on Plato he lived to finish only the Apology. It was printed after his death at the Clarendon Press in 1867. In the same volume appeared a Digest of Platonic Idioms.

He made various translations, in the Anthologia Oxoniensis and in Sabrinæ Corolla. These were collected, with additions, in Reliquiæ Metricæ (Oxford and London, 1867).
