= List of presidents of Magdalen College, Oxford =

The head of Magdalen College, University of Oxford, is the president.

The following is a list of presidents of the college:

- John Horley or Hornley (President of Magdalen Hall which preceded the college, 1448–1457)
- William Tybard (1457–1480)
- Richard Mayew (1480–1506)
- John Veysey or Harman (1507–1507)
- John Claymond (1507–1516)
- John Higdon (1516–1525)
- Lawrence Stubbs (1525–1528)
- Thomas Knollys (1528–1536)
- Owen Oglethorpe (1536–1552)
- Walter Haddon (1552–1553)
- Owen Oglethorpe (1553–1555)
- Arthur Cole (1555–1558)
- Thomas Coveney (1558–1561)
- Lawrence Humphrey (1561–1589)
- Nicholas Bond (1589–1608)
- John Harding (1608–1610)
- William Langton (1610–1626)
- Accepted Frewen (1626–1644)
- John Wilkinson (1644–1648)
- John Oliver (1648–1650)
- Thomas Goodwin (1650–1660)
- John Oliver (1660–1661)
- Thomas Pierce (1661–1672)
- Henry Clerke (1672–1687)
- John Hough (1687–1701)
- Samuel Parker (1688–1701)
- Bonaventure Gifford (1688–1688)
- John Rogers (1688–1703)
- Thomas Bayley (1703–1706)
- Joseph Harwar (1706–1722)
- Edward Butler (1722–1745)
- Thomas Jenner (1745–1768)
- George Horne (1768–1791)
- Martin Routh (1791–1854)
- Frederick Bulley (1854–1885)
- Thomas Herbert Warren (1885–1928)
- George Stuart Gordon (1928–1942)
- Henry Tizard (1942–1946)
- Thomas Boase (1947–1968)
- James Griffiths (1968–1979)
- Keith Griffin (1979–1988)
- Anthony Smith (1988–2005)
- David Clary (2005–2020)
- Dinah Rose (2020 onwards)
