= Joseph Harwar =

English academic

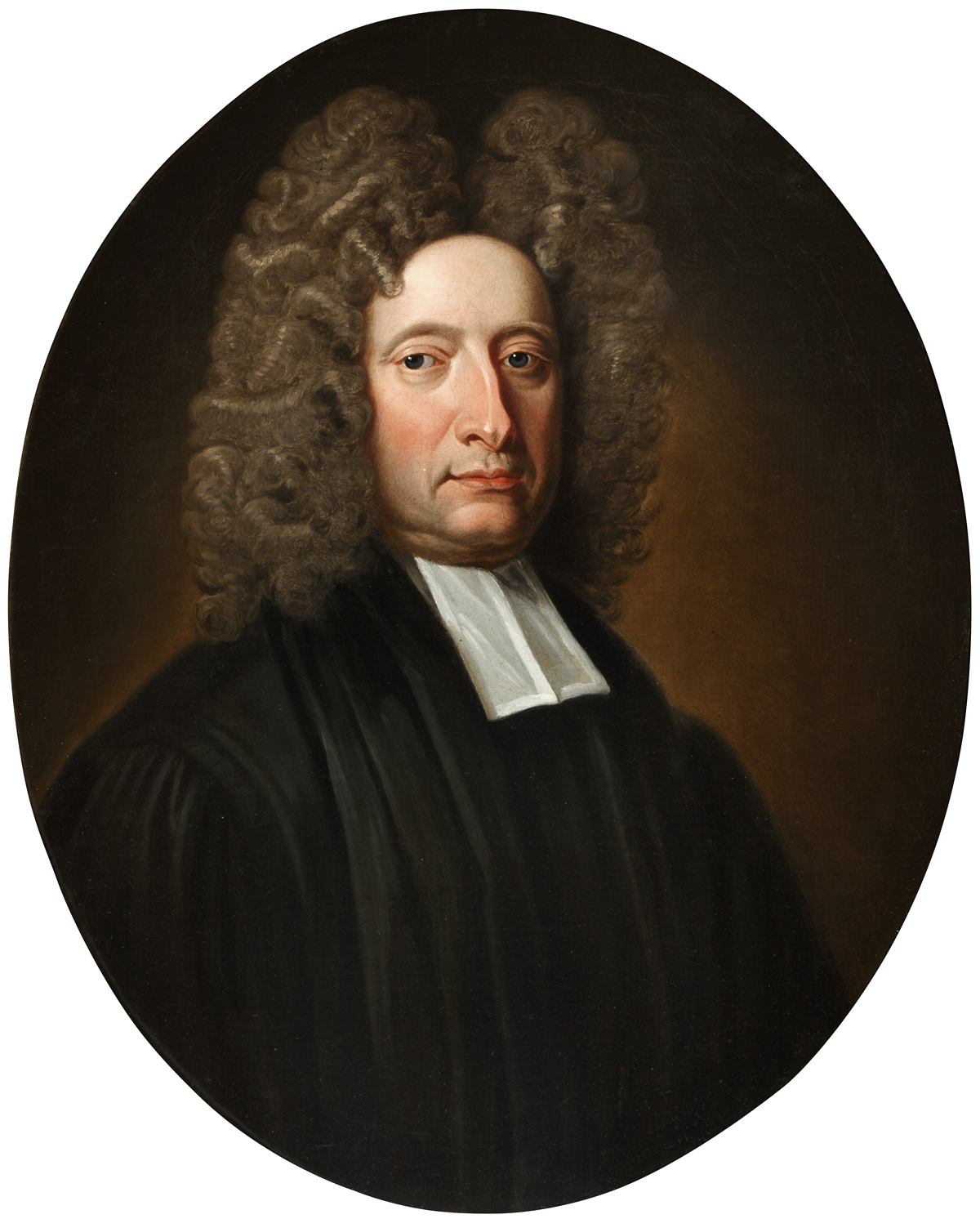
Joseph Harwar

Joseph Harwar (12 November 1654, Stoke, Warwickshire – 15 July 1722, Oxford) was an English academic.

Harwar was educated at Magdalen College, Oxford, where he was then a fellow from 1681 to 1706. He was Magdalen's President from 1706 until his death. He was vicar of Lockington from 1687 to 1692, and rector of St Clement's, Oxford from 1696.

Preceded by Thomas Bayley	President of Magdalen College, Oxford; 1706–1722	Succeeded by Edward Butler
