= Thomas Bayly =

Thomas Bayly may refer to:

- Thomas Bayly (Maryland politician) (1775–1829), Maryland congressman
- Thomas Monteagle Bayly (1775–1834), Virginia congressman
- Thomas H. Bayly (1810–1856), Virginia congressman and son of Thomas M. Bayly
- Thomas Haynes Bayly (1797–1839), English poet and songwriter
- Thomas Bayly (bishop) (died 1670), Anglican bishop in Ireland
- Thomas Bayly or Thomas Bailey (priest) (died 1657), religious controversialist
- Thomas Bayly or Thomas Baily (died 1591), Master of Clare Hall and Catholic priest

== See also ==
- Thomas Bayley (disambiguation)
- Thomas Bayly Howell (1767–1815), English lawyer and writer
- Thomas Bailey (disambiguation)
- Thomas Baillie (disambiguation)
