= John Harding (Hebraist) =

English churchman and academic

John Harding (died 1610) was an English churchman and academic. He was Regius Professor of Hebrew at Oxford from 1591 to 1598, and President of Magdalen College, Oxford, from 1607. He was also involved in the translation of the Authorized King James Version, becoming leader of the First Oxford Company of translators after the death of John Rainolds.

== Life ==
He was a demy of Magdalen College. He graduated B.A. 1578 and M.A. 1581. He proceeded B.D. 1592, and D.D. 1597.

He became a Fellow of Magdalen College, and was proctor in 1589. He was rector of Great Haseley, Oxfordshire, from 1597, and a prebendary of Lincoln Cathedral from 1604.

== Family ==
He had three sons and four daughters by his wife Isabel (married before, under the name Clarke), including the translator and alchemist John Harding (died 1665), rector of Brinkworth.

Academic offices
Preceded by Nicholas Bond	President of Magdalen College, Oxford; 1608–1610	Succeeded by William Langton
