= Horspath Cricket Club =

Cricket club in Oxfordshire, England

Horspath Cricket Club is a cricket club based in the village of Horspath, Oxfordshire, England. They play at the Recreation Ground on the Oxford Road and are members of the Home Counties Premier Cricket League. The club also has three other men's teams which play in the Cherwell League and one which plays friendly matches on Sundays, and has a large youth section with U17, U15, U13 and U11 teams and achieved Clubmark accreditation in 2008.

== History ==
Cricket has been played in Horspath for more than a century. It is thought that the Cricket Club was founded in the mid 1890s possibly 1894 - two years after the formation of the Parish Council - when a game was played against Garsington.

The cricket pitch was originally located in a field to the northwest of the Current pitch. Pads were unknown and players sported the same hobnailed boots and leather leggings they wore at work on the farm.

The pitch was a field which had been ploughed for centuries in a "ridge and furrow" pattern around the contour of the hill. This prevented water running off and created a series of ridges and valleys in the land, making fielding interesting to say the least. Matches were limited to neighbouring villages because of transport limitations.

The present pitch was created in 1924 when the Parish Council acquired the land.

In 1926, the Parish Council acquired a First World War army hut from Wendover. It was brought to Horspath on a horse and cart and placed in the corner of the current car park. This was to become the village hall and cricket pavilion.

The outfield was only levelled in the 1960s - a decade which also saw the introduction of Sunday Cricket. It hadn't been allowed before as it was considered to be disrespectful to the Church.

The current village hall was opened in 1965 and recent times have seen improvements to the clubroom, changing rooms and the installation of two all weather outdoor nets.

In 2001 the club merged with another local cricket club in the area. However this move was unsuccessful and Horspath reformed in the winter of 2003-4.

== Horspath CC 2004- ==
Since the reforming of the club in the 2004 season, the club has enjoyed its most successful run: Adrian Manger has led the 1st XI to four consecutive promotions from Division 5 in 2004 to Division 2 for the 2007 season. While Gordon Hamilton (and in 2006 Alex Eason) have mirrored this in the 2nd XI by gaining three consecutive promotions leaving the 2nd XI in Division 6 for the 2007 season having been in Division 9 in 2004. In the 2006 season the club introduced a 3rd XI, who went on to win Division 9b. To cap off a remarkable 2006 season the club reached the final of the Oxfordshire leg of the Village Cup.

2007 proved to be another highly successful year for the club with Adrian Manger leading the 1st XI to the Division 2 title (4 years of consecutive promotion), while Nick Birks led the 3rd XI to the Division 8 title. The 1st XI once again reached the final of the Oxfordshire leg of the Village Cup, only to lose by bowl-out.

The 2008 season will see the 1st XI playing the highest standard of cricket in the club's history in the Oxford Times Cherwell League's Division 1.
