= Edward Butler (academic) =

English academic administrator

Edward Butler D.C.L. (1686–1745) was an English academic administrator at the University of Oxford.

Butler was awarded a Doctor of Civil Law at Oxford University. He was elected President (head) of Magdalen College, Oxford, on 29 July 1722, a post he held until he died in 1745. Butler, a Whig, was a politically oriented. He was a significant benefactor to Magdalen College. During his time as President of Magdalen, Butler was also Vice-Chancellor of Oxford University from 1728 until 1732.

Academic offices
Preceded by Joseph Harwar	President of Magdalen College, Oxford; 1722–1745	Succeeded by Thomas Jenner
Preceded by John Mather	Vice-Chancellor of Oxford University; 1728–1732	Succeeded by William Holmes
