= Tom Bayley (footballer, born 1921) =

English association football player

Personal information
- Full name: Thomas Kenneth Bayley
- Date of birth: 25 June 1921
- Place of birth: Wednesbury, Staffordshire, England
- Date of death: 1996 (aged 74–75)
- Place of death: Stafford, Staffordshire, England
- Position: Goalkeeper

Senior career*
Years	Team	Apps	(Gls)
1947–1948	Wrexham	6	(0)
- Darlaston Town
- * Club domestic league appearances and goals

Thomas Kenneth Bayley (25 June 1921 – 1996) was an English professional footballer who played as a goalkeeper. He made appearances in the English Football League for Wrexham and also played for Darlaston Town.

Bayley also guested for Walsall during the Second World War.
