= Nicholas Bond =

English churchman and academic

Nicholas Bond (1540–1608) was an English churchman and academic, President of Magdalen College, Oxford, from 1590.

== Life ==
A native of Lincolnshire, he matriculated as a pensioner of St. John's College, Cambridge, 27 May 1559, was elected a Lady Margaret scholar on 27 July following, proceeded B.A. in 1564, and became a fellow of Magdalen College, Oxford, in 1565. He was admitted M.A. at Oxford, 17 October 1574, and D.D. 15 July 1580. In 1574 he received from the crown the rectory of Bourton-on-the-Water, Gloucestershire, and in 1575 resigned his fellowship at Magdalen. On 24 March 1582 he was installed canon of Westminster.

In 1584 Bond was recommended by Archbishop John Whitgift to the Queen for the mastership of the Temple, vacant by the death of Richard Alvey. He became rector of Britwell, Oxfordshire, on 3 May 1586, and of Alresford, Hampshire, in 1590; he also held the offices of chaplain of the Savoy Hospital and chaplain-in-ordinary to the queen.

On 6 April 1590 he became president of Magdalen College. The queen had directed the fellows of the college to elect Bond to that office some months previously; but another candidate, Ralph Smith, then received a majority of the votes. Bond's supporters had recourse to a tactic: the announcement of the result was delayed beyond the statutable time within which the fellows were lawfully able to exercise their rights of election. The duty of appointing the president thus reverted to the crown, and it was exercised in favour of Bond. Bond was vice-chancellor of Oxford University from 16 July 1590 to 16 July 1591, and from 13 July 1592 to 13 July 1593; he was brought into personal relations with Queen Elizabeth on her visit to Oxford in September 1592, during his second tenure of the vice-chancellorship.

As an executor of the will of the Frances Radclyffe, Countess of Sussex, of 10 September 1595, Bond helped to found Sidney Sussex College, Cambridge, on the site of the dissolved Greyfriars House. He received Henry Frederick, Prince of Wales, when the prince took up his residence at Magdalen on 27 August 1605. Bond died on 8 February 1608, and was buried in the chapel of Magdalen College, where there is an inscription to his memory. He contributed Latin verses to the collection published at Oxford on the death of Queen Elizabeth. Bond has sometimes erroneously been confused with Nicholas Bownde.

== Notes ==
Academic offices
Preceded by Lawrence Humphrey	President of Magdalen College, Oxford; 1590–1608	Succeeded by John Harding
