= Frederick Bulley =

British academic administrator (1810–1885)

The Reverend Frederick Bulley

President of Magdalen College, Oxford
- In office 5 January 1855 – 3 September 1885
- Preceded by: Martin Routh
- Succeeded by: Thomas Herbert Warren

Personal details
- Born: 1810 Reading, Berkshire, England
- Died: September 3, 1885 (aged 74–75) Oxford, England

Frederick Bulley (1810 – 3 September 1885) was President of Magdalen College, Oxford, from 1855 until his death.

Frederick (or Frederic) was born in Reading in Berkshire in 1810, the third son of Dr. John Bulley of that place and his wife, Charlotte, the daughter of Capt. Samuel Pocock of Beenham House, also in Berkshire. He matriculated at the University of Oxford, as a member of Magdalen College, on 26 July 1825 at the age of 14. He obtained his BA degree in 1829 (a third-class degree in Literae Humaniores), his MA in 1832, his BD degree in 1840 and his DD degree in 1855. He was a Fellow of Magdalen College, and a Tutor in law and history.

He was elected President of Magdalen College on 5 January 1855, in succession to Martin Routh who had been President from 1791 until his death in 1854. The Times said on his election that he was "much respected throughout the University" and was the expected successor. During his time as President, his "extreme kindness and urbanity of manner" was noted.

Bulley had a country mansion called Marston Hill House, built in 1884–85 in Marston Meysey parish, in the north of Wiltshire, close to Gloucestershire. He died on 3 September 1885 in Fairford, Gloucestershire.
