= Presenter =

Presenter may refer to:

== People ==
- News presenter, person who presents news during a news program
- Sports commentator, an announcer who presents analysis of a sporting event
- Radio personality, presenter or announcer on a radio show
- Television presenter, person who introduces or hosts television programs
- Talk show host, presenter of a television or radio talk show
- Disc jockey, person who presents recorded music for a live or radio audience
- Master of ceremonies, host and presenter at a ceremony or staged event
- Weather presenter, person who presents broadcast weather forecasts
- Game show host (or quizmaster), person who asks questions at quiz game programs

== Other ==
- Microsoft PowerPoint, formerly known as Presenter
- Adobe Presenter, eLearning software released by Adobe Systems
- Presentation program
