= Martin Routh =

English classical scholar and college head

The Reverend Martin Routh
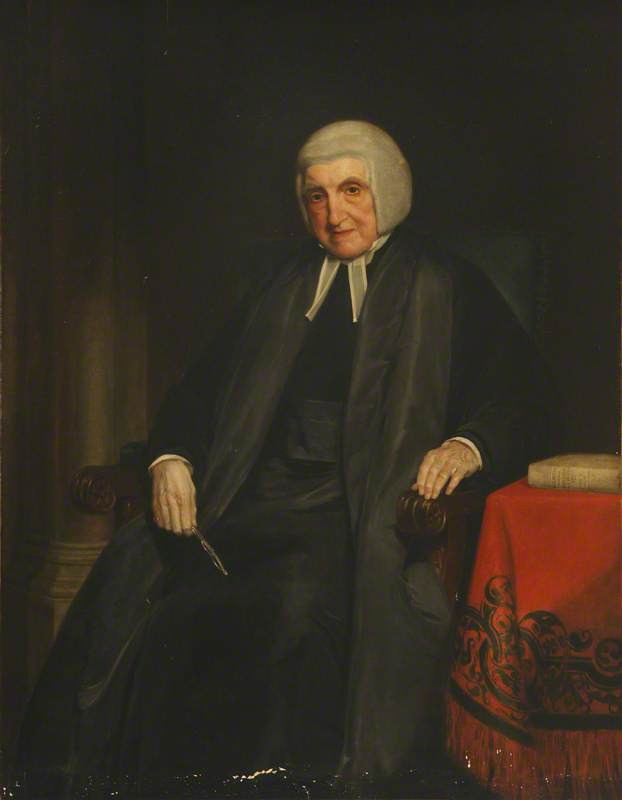
- Portrait of Routh by Henry William Pickersgill

President of Magdalen College, Oxford
- In office 28 April 1791 – 22 December 1854
- Preceded by: George Horne
- Succeeded by: Frederick Bulley

Personal details
- Born: 18 September 1755 Rectory of St. Peter's and St. Margaret's, South Elmham, Suffolk
- Died: 22 December 1854 (aged 99) Magdalen College, Oxford, England
- Spouse: Eliza Agnes Blagrave (1790–1869)

Martin Joseph Routh (/raʊθ/, ROWTH; 18 September 1755 – 22 December 1854) was an English classical scholar and President of Magdalen College, Oxford (1791–1854).

== Birthplace and Oxford career ==
Routh was born at South Elmham, Suffolk, son of the Rev. Peter Routh, rector there, and his wife, Mary Reynolds. He matriculated at The Queen's College, Oxford, on 31 May 1770 and on 24 July 1771, was elected to a demyship at Magdalen College. He graduated B.A. on 5 February 1774 and was elected on 25 July 1775 to a fellowship of his college. On 23 October 1776 he took an MA, proceeding B.D. in 1786, and D.D. on 6 July 1790. On 21 December 1777, he received deacon's orders from Philip Yonge, Bishop of Norwich; but did not take priest's orders until 1810. He became a college tutor, a librarian in 1781, a Junior Dean of Arts in 1784–5, and in 1785 served as Junior Proctor of the university.

On 28 April 1791 Routh became the President of Magdalen College, a post he held for the next 63 years until his death in 1854.

== Literary works ==
Routh did not excel in modern languages but was an excellent classical scholar. In 1784 was published his edition of the Euthydemus and Gorgias of Plato but as time went on his interests turned towards patristics, which he would devote the rest of his life to studying. He was especially interested in the minor ecclesiastics of the second and third centuries, the ante-Nicene fathers. In 1814 he published two volumes of Sacrae reliquiae; in 1818 the third and fourth volumes appeared; in 1848 appeared the fifth volume. Samuel Parr said on 26 March 1814:

I have most carefully perused the two volumes of the Sacrae reliquiae. No such work has appeared in English for a century. I wish Joe Scaliger, Bishop Pearson, Richard Bentley, Bishop Bull, Bishop Stillingfleet, and Doctors Grabe and Whitby were living to read what I have been reading...Martin Routh is of the right stamp, orthodox but not intolerant, profound, not obscure, wary, not sceptical, very, very, very learned, not pedantic at all.

In 1823 appeared Routh's edition of Bishop Burnet's History of My Own Time. This included the notes made by Lord Dartmouth, Lord Hardwicke and Jonathan Swift in their personal copies, along with Routh's own notes. The second edition with corrections appeared in 1833. Samuel Parr wrote to Lord Holland on 16 March 1823: "The new edition of Burnet is honourable to the University...As to the Preface, it is worthy of the learned, wise, upright, candid writer. Routh is a Jacobite, but a Constitutionalist; he is not a Ministerialist; he is really a lover of civil liberty...The perspicuity and ease of the composition was to me delightful". In 1852, aged 97, Routh published the portion of Burnet's History that covered the reign of James II (1685–1689), adding material not included in the previous edition. He presented a copy to the Chancellor of Oxford, the Duke of Wellington. Routh's nephew, who helped him with the book, enquired of him: "Why is it, uncle, that you are always working at Burnet, whom you are always attacking?" Routh replied: "A good question, sir. Because I know the man to be a liar; and am determined to prove him so".

== Later life ==
When the American Anglicans visited England in 1783 on to help them set up their own episcopate, Thurlow recommended they consult Routh. Routh advised them against approaching the Lutheran bishops of Denmark and instead recommended they approach the Episcopal Church of Scotland as this church had a high church tradition. On 14 November 1784 Robert Kilgour, Bishop of Aberdeen and Primus of Scotland, Arthur Petrie, Bishop of Ross and Moray, and the coadjutor-bishop of Aberdeen, John Skinner, consecrated Samuel Seabury of Connecticut as bishop. This act was crucial in the survival of the American Episcopal church.

In 1810, he was presented with the valuable living of Tilehurst in Berkshire, where, it is recorded, he liked to spend his holidays when not in Oxford. He married Eliza Agnes Blagrave, daughter of John Blagrave of Calcot Park in Tilehurst, a lady some thirty-five years his junior.

== Last years ==
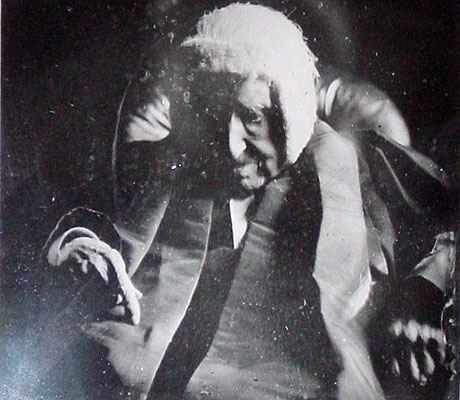
Daguerreotype of Routh aged 99 (1854). Routh is the earliest-born person from outside the United States of whom there is a confirmed photograph.

Routh sympathised with the Tractarians of the High Church Oxford Movement in the 1830s and 1840s. R. W. Church in his history of the Oxford Movement said Routh "had gone below the surface, and was acquainted with the questions debated by those [Anglican] divines, there was nothing startling in what so alarmed his brethren, whether he agreed with it or not; and to him the indiscriminate charge of Popery meant nothing. But Dr. Routh stood alone among his brother Heads in his knowledge of what English theology was". John Henry Newman dedicated his Lectures on the Prophetical Office of the Church (1837) to Routh as one "who has been reserved to report to a forgetful generation what was the theology of their fathers".

Shrunken in size and deaf, Routh retained his eyesight, his good memory, and his other intellectual powers to the last, dying at Magdalen College.

== Legacy ==
Many affectionate stories were told of him, but he is best known today for his response to John Burgon, who asked him what he would say to a young don seeking advice: "You will find it a very good practice always to verify your references, sir!" This is also to be found in the short form, "Always verify your references", with and without the "sir". His last words when he collapsed taking a heavy volume from a high shelf in his library allegedly were: "A worthless volume, sir! A worthless volume!". According to Jan Morris, Routh's last words, spoken to his housekeeper, were "Don't trouble yourself". John Richard Green recalled him "moving like some mysterious dream of the past among the punier creatures of the present".

Routh did not leave a will, but had made a deed in 1852 to leave his library of 15,000 printed books to the fledgling University of Durham, and this was enacted after his death. Routh's books remained the university's most significant collection of early printed books, until its acquisition in 1937 of Cosin's Library.

Routh Lane, Tilehurst - adjacent to St Michael's Church - is named after him., as is Routh Road in Barton, Oxford.

== Works ==
- His edition of the Euthydemus and Gorgias of Plato, 8vo, Oxford, 1784.
- Reliquiæ sacræ sive auctorum fere jam perditorum secundi tertiique seculi post Christum natum quæ supersunt, 4 vols. 8vo, Oxford, 1814–1818; the first two in 1814, the third in 1815, the fourth in 1818. Routh added a fifth volume in 1848, and brought out a second edition of the first four, the whole in 5 vols. 8vo, 1846–8.
- An edition of Burnet's History of his own Time, with notes by the Earls of Dartmouth and Hardwicke and Swift, and observations, 6 vols. 8vo, Oxford, 1823; a second edition, 1833.
- Scriptorum ecclesiasticorum opuscula præcipua quædam, 2 vols. 8vo, Oxford, 1832; a second edition, 1840, re-edited (anonymously) by Dr. William Jacobson, Bishop of Chester, 1858.
- An edition of Burnet's History of the Reign of James II, with additional notes, 8vo, Oxford, 1852.
- Tres breves Tractatus, containing De primis episcopis, S. Petri Alexandrini episcopi fragmenta quædam, and S. Irenæi illustrata rhēsis, in qua ecclesia Romana commemoratur, 8vo, Oxford, 1853. He wrote a large number of Latin inscriptions, four of which are given in the pages of Burgon's Life and twenty-five in an appendix.

== See also ==
- List of presidents of Magdalen College, Oxford

== Notes ==
Preceded by George Horne	President of Magdalen College, Oxford; 1791–1854	Succeeded by Frederick Bulley
