= Spiers Memorial Award =

Spiers Memorial Award is presented in recognition of an individual who has made an outstanding contribution to the field of a Faraday Discussion.

The award, given annually since 1929, includes £2000, a medal and a certificate, and recognizes an individual who has made an outstanding contribution to the field of a Faraday Discussion.
