= List of people associated with Lincoln College, Oxford =

This is a list of Lincoln College people, including former students, Fellows, Honorary Fellows and Rectors of the college of Lincoln College of the University of Oxford. This list is mostly male because women were only admitted to study at Lincoln in 1979.

== Former students ==
=== Academics ===
- Geoffrey Alderman (born 1944) — historian
- Hugh Hale Bellot (1890–1969) — Professor of American History and Vice-Chancellor, University of London (1951–53)
- Deborah Bowman (born 1968) — medical ethicist
- Stephanie Cragg — professor of neuroscience at University of Oxford
- David Denison (born 1950) — professor of linguistics
- Raymond Dwek (born 1941) — scientist at Oxford and co-founder of biotechnology company Oxford GlycoSciences
- Roger H. Martin (born 1943) — American college president
- Stanley Mitchell (1932–2011) — translator, academic, and author
- George Mearns Savery (1850–1905) — educator, and founder of Harrogate Ladies' College. 1876 president of the Oxford Union Society.
- Philip Schwyzer (born 1970) — American-British literary scholar, professor, and author
- Jeremy Waldron (born 1953) — New Zealand legal and political philosopher
- O. W. Wolters (1915–2000) — Malayan civil servant and pioneering
- Lady Mary Wellesley (born 1986) — Medieval historian of Southeast Asia
- Louis Zinkin (1925–1993) — analytical psychologist

=== Authors, actors, poets ===
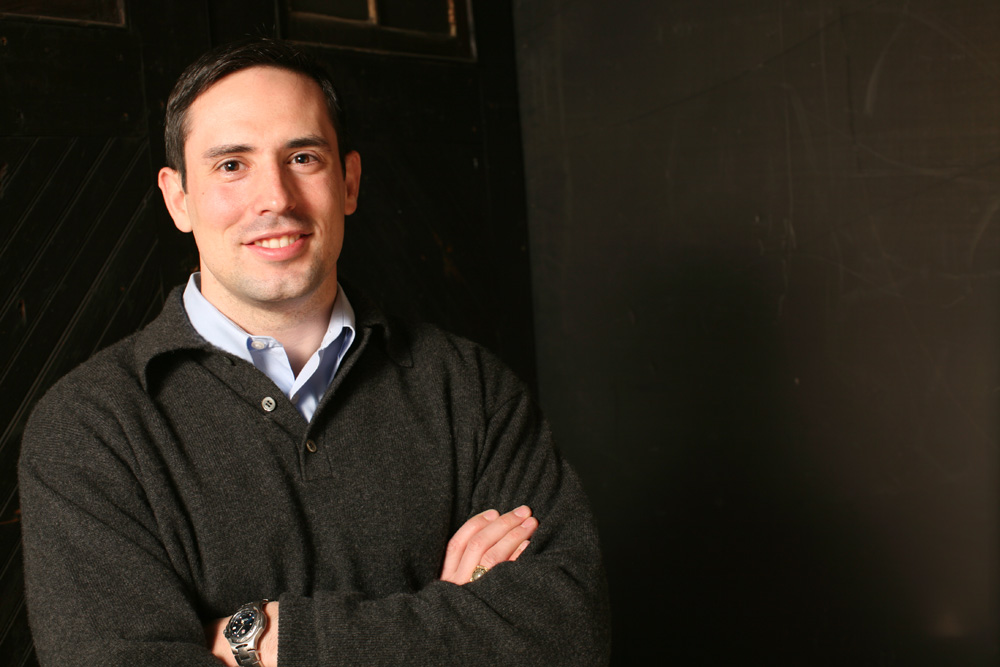
Craig Mullaney

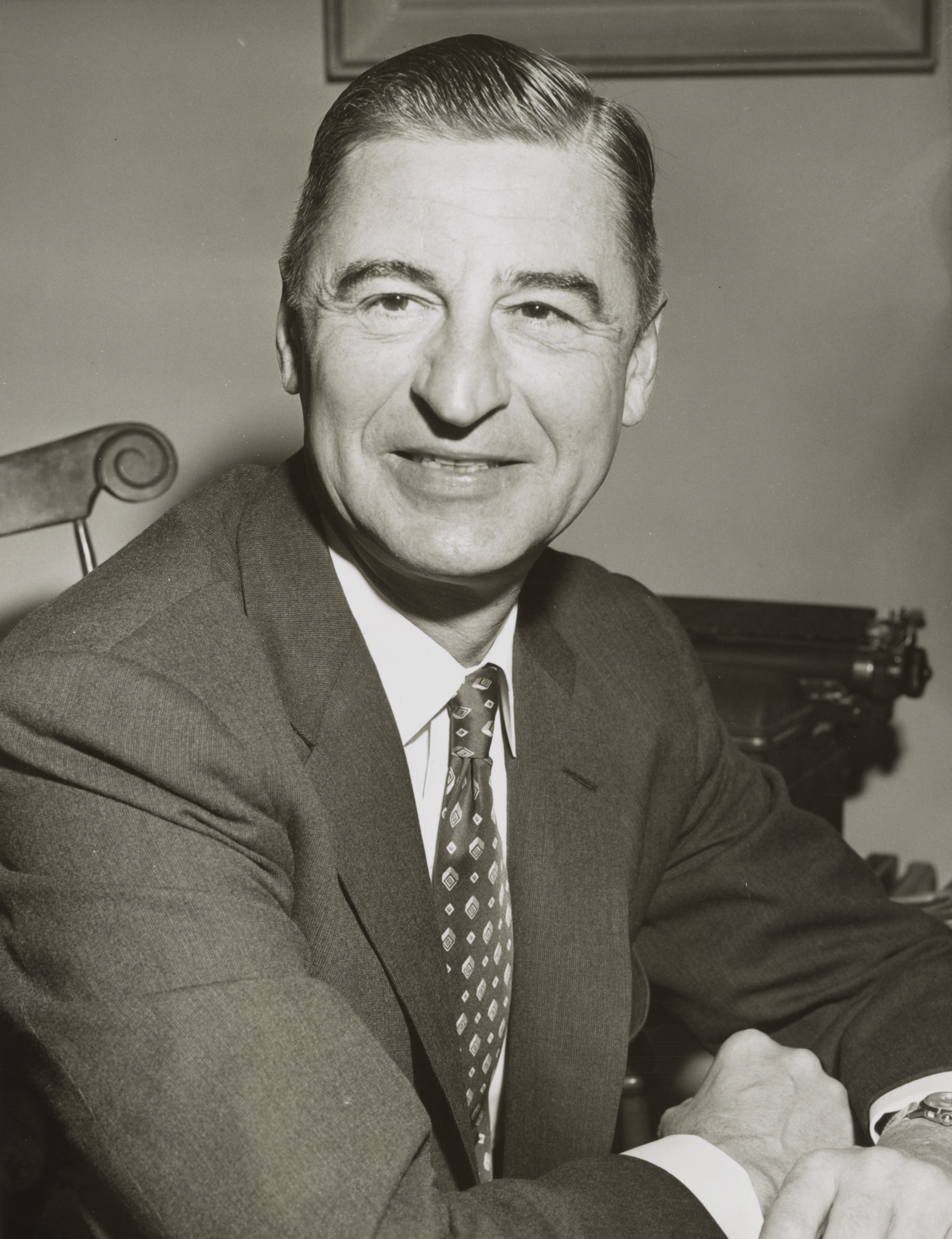
Dr. Seuss

- Naomi Alderman (born 1974) — novelist
- Eve Best (born 1971) — actress
- William Davenant (1606–1688) — poet and playwright
- Sefton Delmer (1904–1970) — journalist and WWII propagandist
- James Essinger (born 1957) — writer
- Mohammad Ali Jouhar (1878–1931) — Indian Muslim leader, journalist and poet
- Osbert Lancaster (1908–1986) — cartoonist, critic and author
- John le Carré (1931–2020) — author, pen name of David Cornwell
- Emily Mortimer (born 1971) — actress
- Craig Mullaney (born c. 1978) — US Army veteran and author
- William Eugene Outhwaite (1847–1900) — New Zealand writer, poet, and lawyer
- Tom Paulin (born 1949) — poet
- Francis Pilkington (1565–1638) — composer
- Dr. Seuss (Theodor Geisel) (1904–1991) — writer and cartoonist
- Rachel Simmons (born 1974) — American author
- Kate Smurthwaite — comedian
- Edward Thomas (1878–1917) — poet
- Tom Ward (born 1971) — actor

=== Broadcasters ===
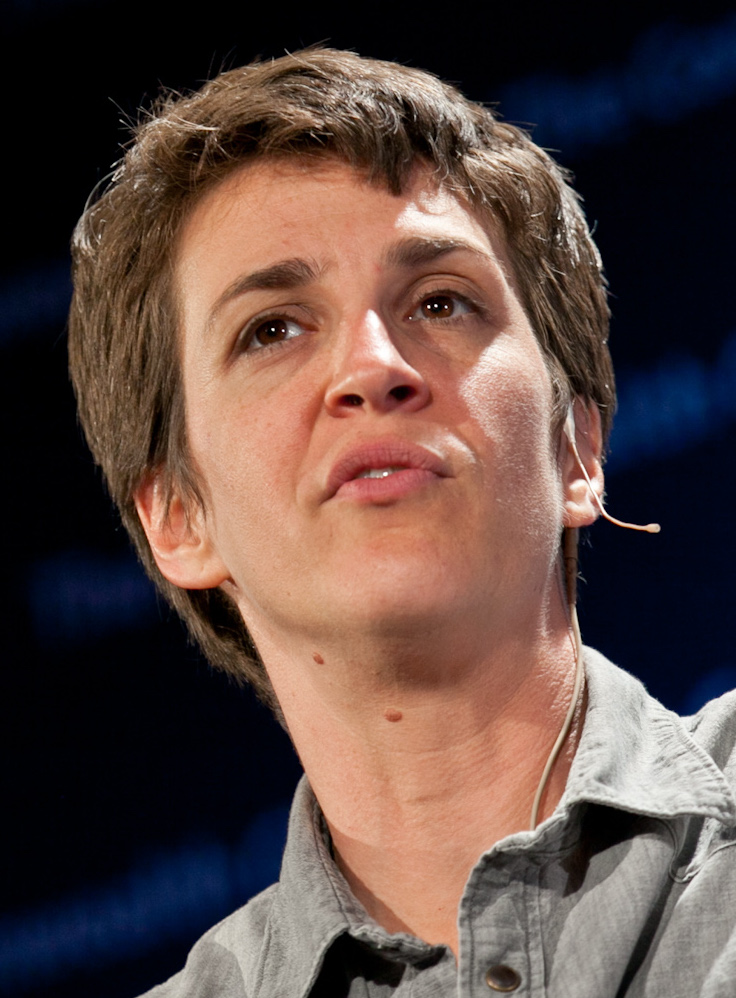
Rachel Maddow

- Suzannah Lipscomb (born 1978) — historian and television presenter
- Rachel Maddow (born 1973) — American television anchor and political analyst

=== Business ===
- David Clementi (born 1949) — deputy governor of the Bank of England and Chairman of the BBC
- Sir Rod Eddington (born 1950) — chief executive of British Airways, 2000–2005
- Adebayo Ogunlesi (born 1953) — Chairman and Managing Partner of Global Infrastructure Partners
- Sir Peter Parker (1924–2002) — Chairman of the British Railways Board, 1976–1983
- Nicola Shaw (born 1968) — executive director of National Grid
- Michael Zilkha (born 1954), entrepreneur, co-founder of ZE Records

=== Clerics ===
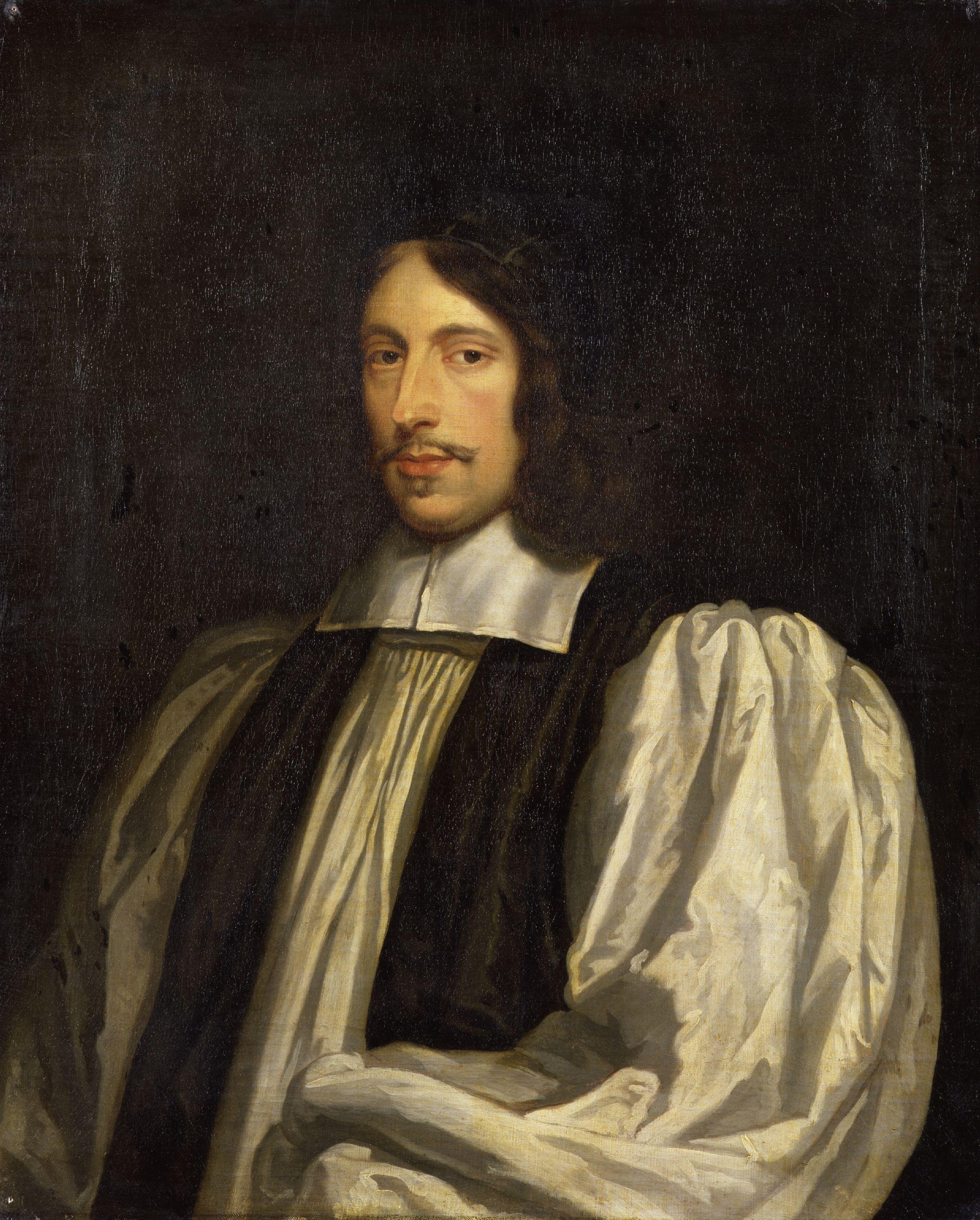
Nathaniel Crewe, 3rd Baron Crewe

- Thomas Brinknell (died 1539?)
- Gregory Cameron (born 1959) — Bishop of St Asaph, Honorary Fellow
- Nathaniel Crewe, 3rd Baron Crewe (1633–1721) — Bishop of Oxford, Bishop of Durham, Rector of Lincoln College
- Jacob Neusner (1932–2016) — American rabbi, scholar of Judaism, and prolific author
- Robert Sanderson (1587-1663) — Bishop of Lincoln (1660-1663)
- Graham Tomlin (born 1958) — former Bishop of Kensington
- William Richard Williams (1896–1962) — theologian
- Colin Winter (1928–1981) — bishop and anti-apartheid activist
- John Wraw (1959–2017) — Bishop of Bradwell

=== Military and intelligence ===
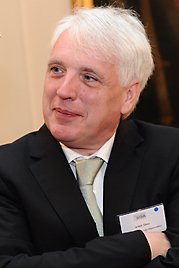
Jamie Shea

- John Adye (born 1939) — former director of GCHQ
- David Craig, Baron Craig of Radley (born 1929) — House of Lords crossbencher and former Chief of the Defence Staff
- William Sholto Douglas (1893–1969) — RAF pilot and WWII military commander
- John Langdon (1921–2015) — Royal Marine officer at D-Day, later became an Anglican priest
- Jamie Shea (born 1953) — NATO spokesman

=== Politicians ===
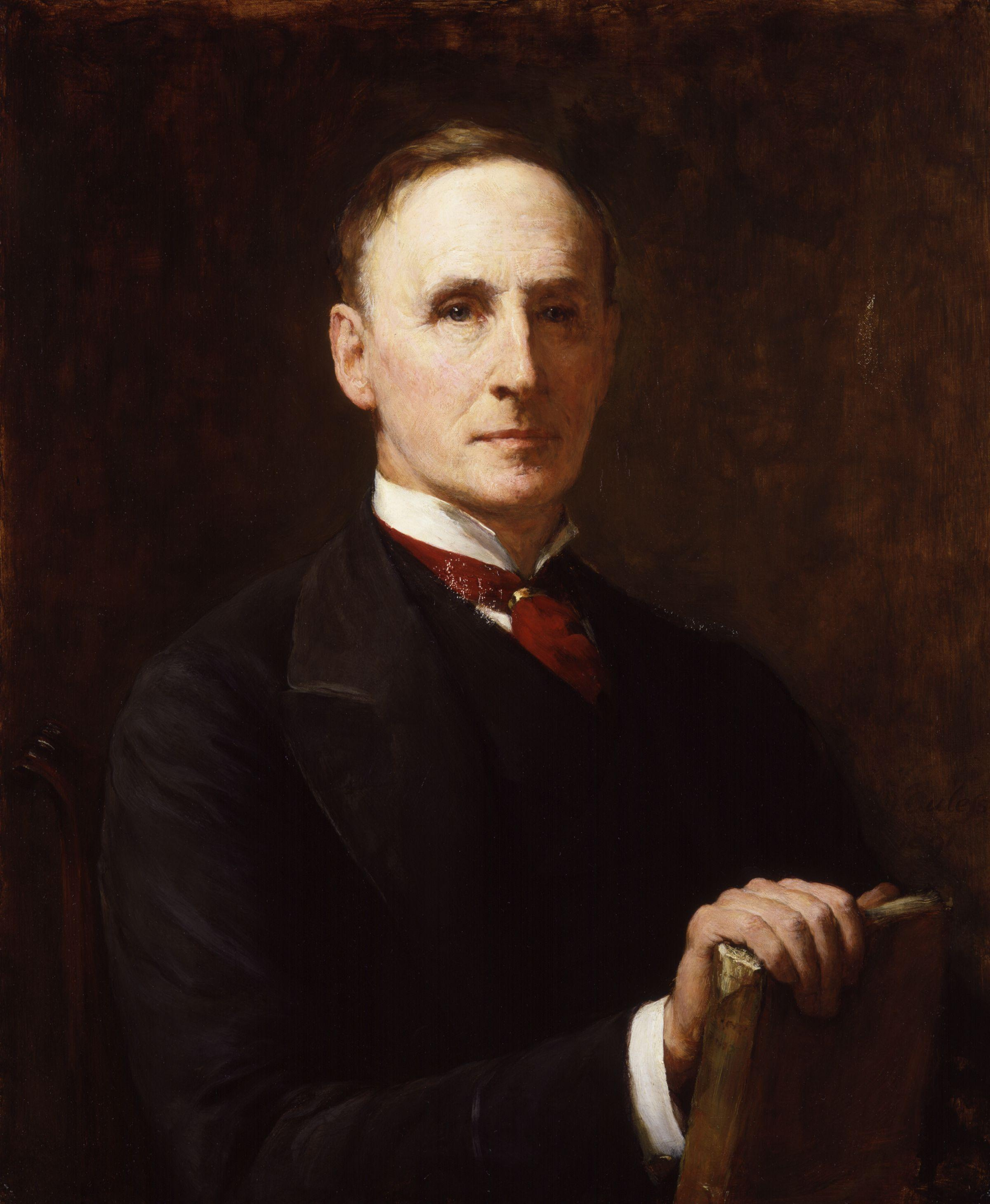
John Morley, 1st Viscount Morley of Blackburn

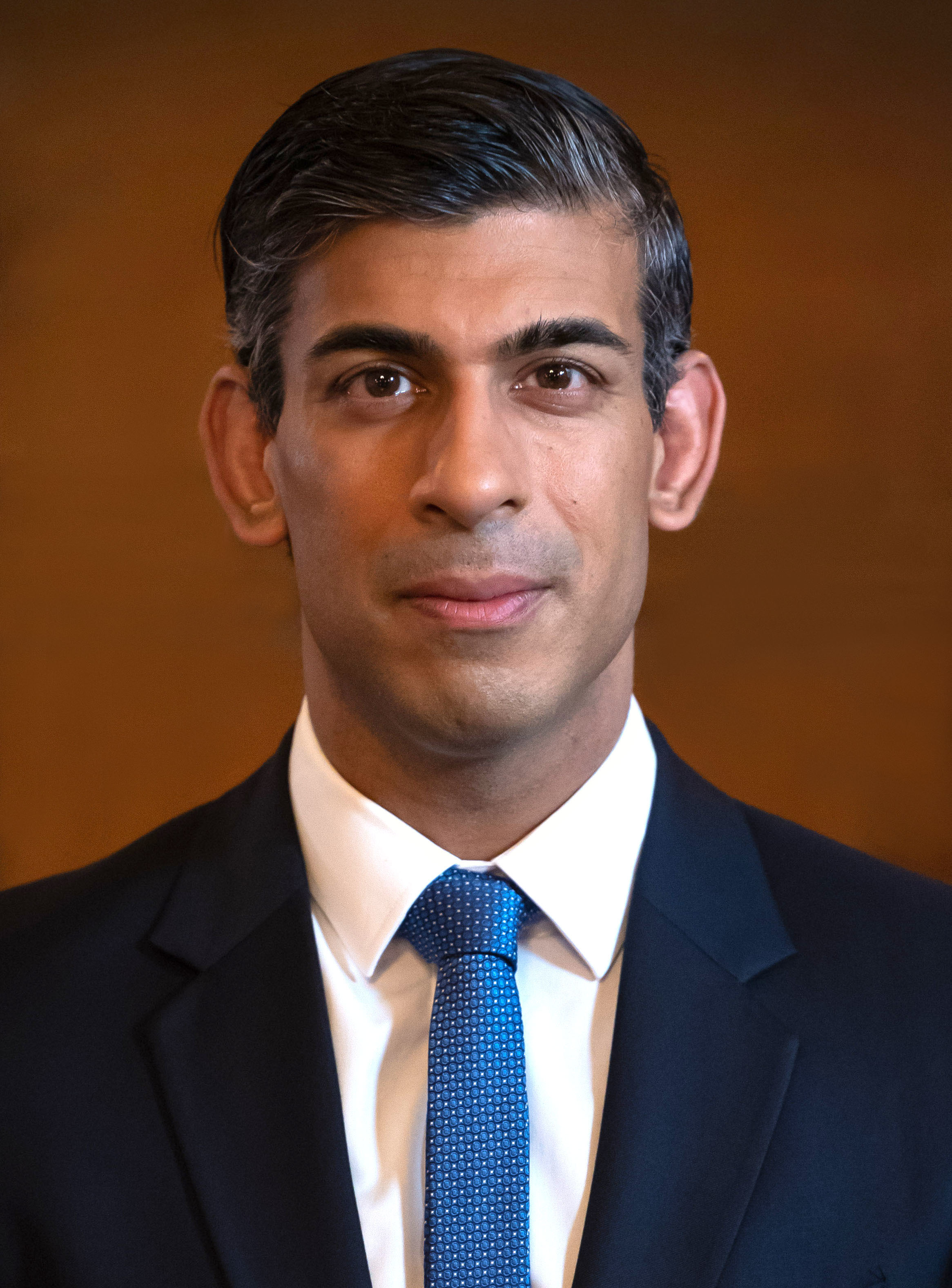
Rishi Sunak

- Peter Ainsworth (1956–2021) — Conservative MP for East Surrey
- Charles Banner (born 1980) - Conservative peer and King’s Counsel
- Geoffrey Bing (1909–1977) — Labour MP for Hornchurch
- Bill Cash (born 1940) — Conservative MP for Stone
- Peter Durack (1926–2008) — Australian politician and Attorney-General of Australia
- Edward Fitzalan-Howard, 18th Duke of Norfolk (born 1956) — Earl Marshal
- Sir Louis Gluckstein (1897–1979) — lawyer and Conservative Party politician
- Nick Hawkins (born 1957) — former MP (Conservative) for Blackpool South and Surrey Heath
- J.A. Hobson (1858–1940) — Liberal thinker and political theorist
- Sir Gerald Hurst (formerly Hertz; 1877–1957) — Conservative Party politician
- David Lewis (1909–1981) — Canadian MP and leader of the New Democratic Party
- James Lupton, Baron Lupton, Conservative peer
- Shabana Mahmood — Labour MP for Birmingham Ladywood since 2010
- John Morley (1838–1923) — Liberal statesman and writer
- Noel Newton Nethersole (1903–1959) — Jamaican cricketer and politician, founder of the Bank of Jamaica
- Chukwuemeka Ojukwu (1933–2011) — Biafran secessionist
- Daniel Poneman (born 1956) — United States Deputy Secretary of Energy
- Mel Reynolds (born 1952) — disgraced former United States Representative from Illinois
- Lee Rowley (born 1980) — Conservative MP for North East Derbyshire since 2017
- Oliver Smith (born 1993) — youngest branch party president in British political history for the Liberal Democrats
- Sir John Stanley (born 1942) — former MP for Tonbridge and Malling (Conservative)
- Rishi Sunak (born 1980) — Prime Minister of the United Kingdom (2022-2024) and Conservative MP for Richmond (Yorks) since 2015
- Mahamudu Bawumia (born 1963) - Vice President of the republic of Ghana (since 2017)

=== Professionals ===
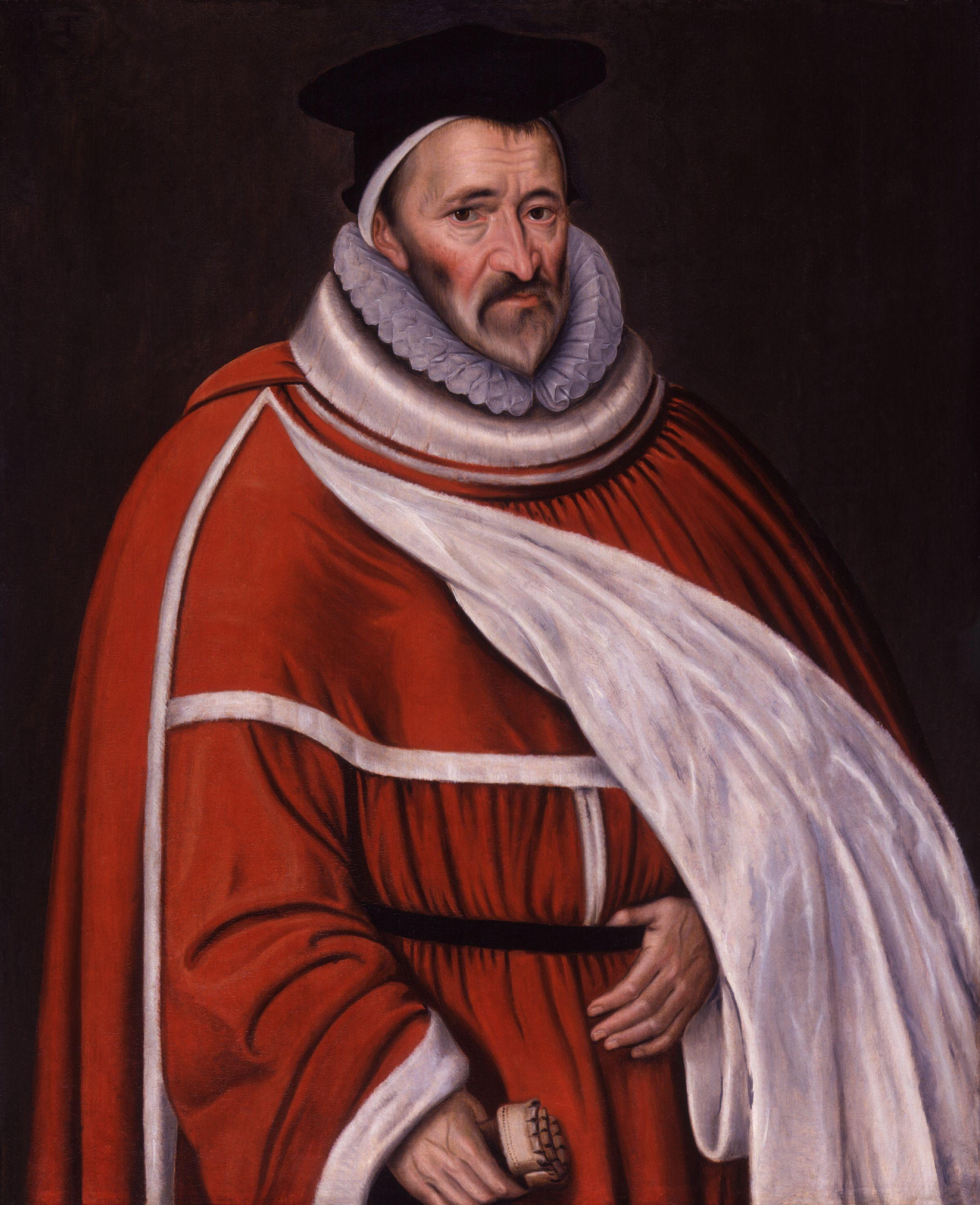
Sir Edmund Anderson

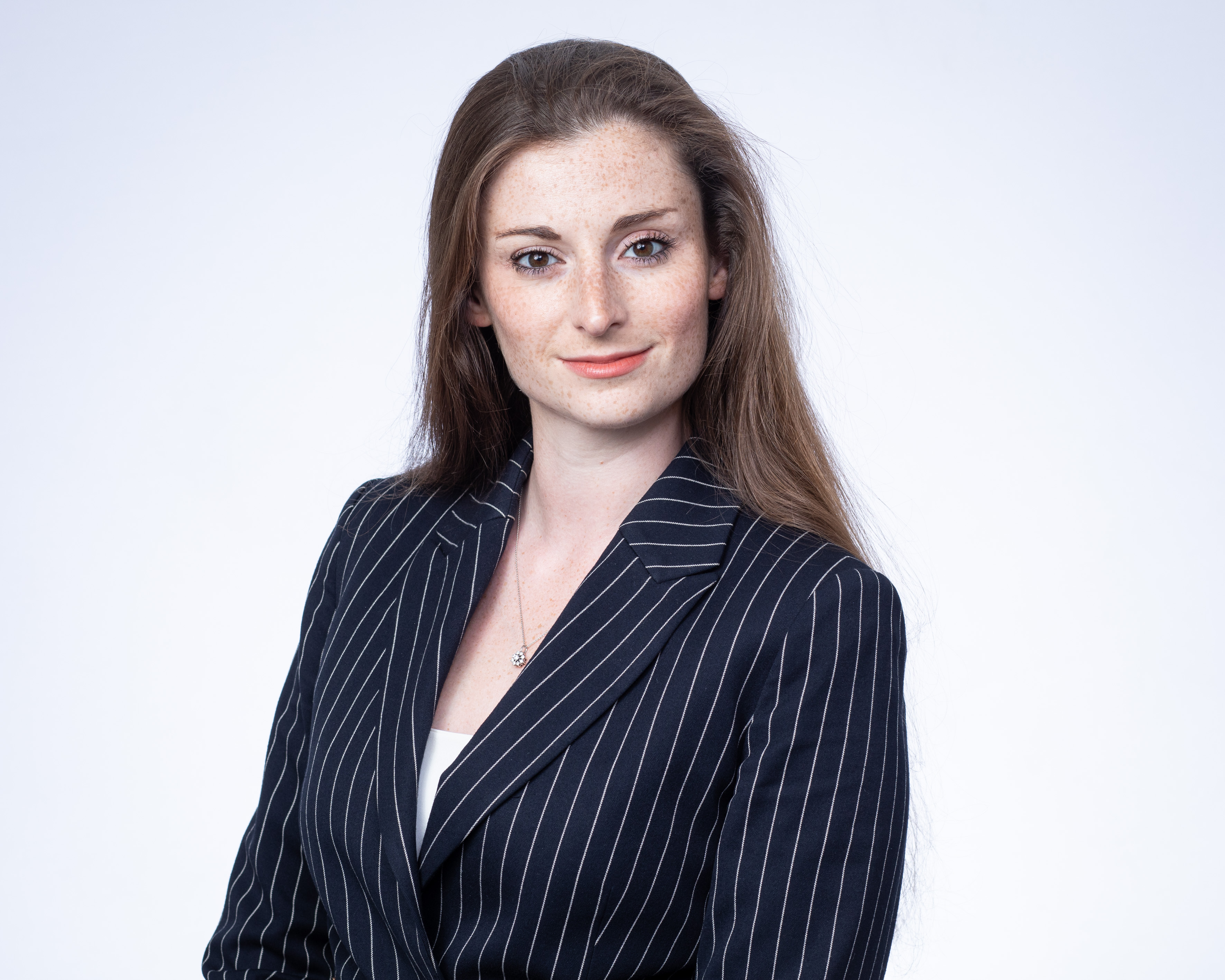
Natasha Hausdorff

- Sir Edmund Anderson (1530–1605) — Chief Justice of the Common Pleas
- Alistair Asprey — Secretary for Security for Hong Kong Government, Commanding Officer of Royal Hong Kong Auxiliary Air Force
- Charles Banner, Baron Banner (born 1980) — planning barrister
- James Burge (1925–2010) — English criminal law barrister, original inspiration for the fictional barrister Rumpole of the Bailey
- Sir Horace Byatt (1875–1933) — governor of Somaliland, Tanganyika, and Trinidad and Tobago
- Joseph Darracott (1934-1998) – art historian, museum curator and writer
- Natasha Hausdorff (born 1989) – barrister, international law commentator, and Israel advocate
- Sir Nicholas Hilliard (born 1959) — Common Serjeant of London
- Sir Brian Keith (born 1944) – judge of the High Court of England and Wales
- David Lewis (born David Losz; 1909-1981) – Canadian labour lawyer and politician.
- Sir Donald Limon (1932–2012) – Clerk of the House of Commons
- Sir Andrew Longmore (born 1944) — Lord Justice of Appeal
- Simon McKie – Advisory services chairman, writer, and lecturer
- Sir Harry Ognall (1934–2021) – High Court judge, barrister, and author
- John Rickman (1771-1840) — statistician, government official and Clerk Assistant, House of Commons
- Robert Rogers, Baron Lisvane (born 1950) – former Clerk of the House of Commons

=== Sportsmen ===
- Will Bratt (born 1988) — racing driver
- Steph Cook (born 1972) — modern pentathlete and Olympic gold medalist
- Lionel Cornish (1879–1939) - 1908 Olympic athlete
- Rowland George (1905–1997) — rower and Olympic gold medalist
- Derek Johnson — Olympic silver and bronze medalist runner

== Academics, fellows, and tutors ==
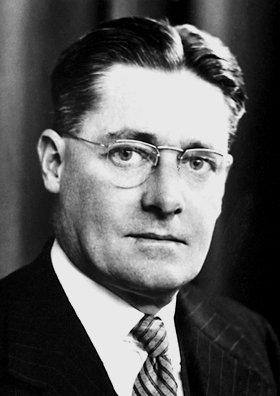
Howard Florey — Nobel Prize recipient

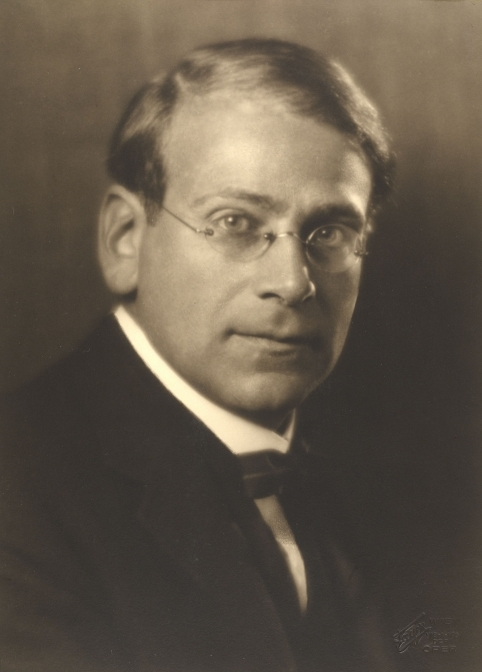
Egon Wellesz

- Sir Edward Abraham (Fellow 1948–1999)
- Samuel Alexander (Fellow 1882-1938)
- Peter Atkins (Fellow 1965–2007, Acting Rector 2007)
- Cécile Fabre (Fellow 2010-2014)
- Howard Florey (Lord Florey) (Fellow 1934–1962)
- Vivian H. H. Green (Fellow 1951–2005, Rector 1983–1987)
- Susan Greenfield (Fellow 1985–present)
- Norman Heatley (Fellow 1948–1978, Supernumerary Fellow 1978–2004)
- Paul Langford (Fellow 1970–2015, Rector 2000–2012)
- Peter Eugene McCullough (Fellow)
- Keith Murray (Fellow 1937–1993, Rector 1944–1953)
- Sir Walter Fraser Oakeshott — Academic and discoverer of the Winchester Manuscript of Le Morte d'Arthur (Rector 1954–1972)
- Mark Pattison (Fellow 1839–1884, Rector 1861–1884)
- John Potter (Fellow 1694–1747)
- John Radcliffe (Fellow 1670–1675)
- Sir Walter Baldwin Spencer (biologist and anthropologist) (Fellow 1886; Honorary Fellow 1916-1929)
- Nevil Sidgwick (Fellow 1901–1958)
- Egon Wellesz (Fellow 1932–1974)
- John Wesley — theologian and founder of Methodism

== Rectors ==
Rector is the title of the head of house of Lincoln College.

- William Chamberleyn, 1429–34
- John Beke, 1434–61
- John Tristropp, 1461–79
- George Strangways, 1480–88
- William Bethome, 1488–93
- Thomas Bank, 1493–1503
- Thomas Drax, 1503–19
- John Cottisford, 1519–39
- Hugh Weston, 1539–56
- Christopher Hargreaves, 1556–58
- Henry Henshaw, 1558–60
- Francis Babington, 1560–63
- John Bridgewater, 1563–74
- John Tatham, 1574–76
- John Underhill, 1577–90
- Richard Kilby, 1590–1620
- Paul Hood, 1621–68
- Nathaniel Crew, 1668–72
- Thomas Marshall, 1672–85
- Fitzherbert Adams, 1685–1719
- John Morley, 1719–31
- Euseby Isham, 1731–55
- Richard Hutchins, 1755–81
- Charles Mortimer, 1781–84
- John Horner, 1784–92
- Edward Tatham, 1792–1834
- John Radford, 1834–51
- James Thompson, 1851–60
- Mark Pattison, 1861–84
- William Walter Merry, 1884–1918
- John Arthur Ruskin Munro, 1919–44
- Keith Anderson Hope Murray, 1944–53
- Walter Fraser Oakeshott, 1953–72
- Burke Trend, 1973–83
- Vivian Hubert Howard Green, 1983–87
- Maurice Shock, 1987–94
- Eric Anderson, 1994–2000
- Paul Langford, 2000–12
- Henry Woudhuysen, 2012–24
- Nigel Clifford, 2024–
