= Anthony Ashley-Cooper, 3rd Earl of Shaftesbury =

English politician, philosopher and writer (1671–1713)

The Right Honourable The Earl of Shaftesbury
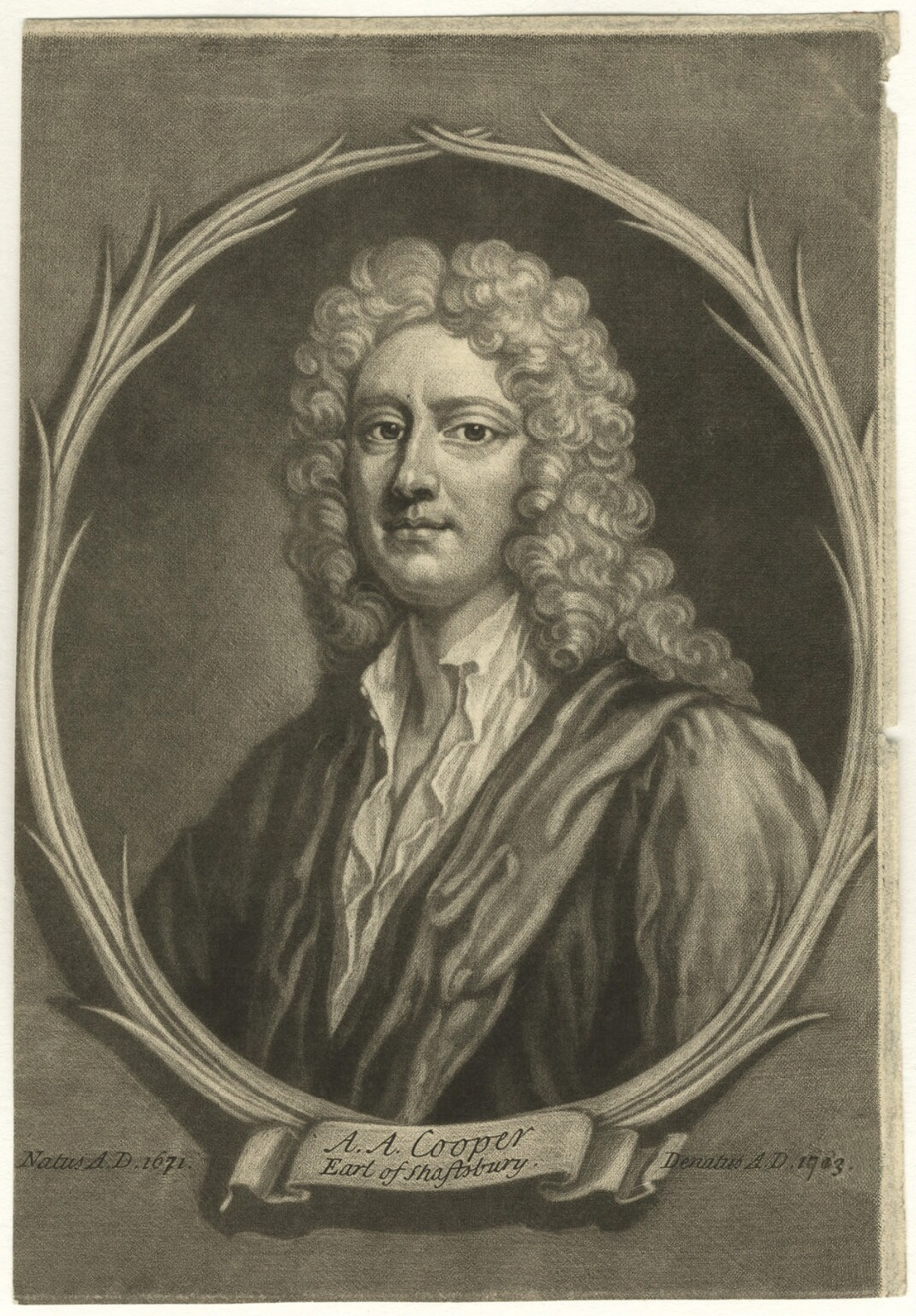
- Portrait by Francis Kyte

Member of the England Parliament for Poole
- In office 1695–1698 Serving with Sir Nathaniel Napier
- Preceded by: John Trenchard; Sir Nathaniel Napier
- Succeeded by: William Joliffe; William Phippard
- Born: 26 February 1671; London, England
- Died: 16 February 1713 (aged 41); Naples, Kingdom of Naples

Philosophical work
- Era: 18th-century philosophy Early modern philosophy
- Region: Western philosophy
- School: Cambridge Platonism

Anthony Ashley-Cooper, 3rd Earl of Shaftesbury (26 February 1671 – 16 February 1713) was an English Whig politician, philosopher and writer.

== Early life ==
He was born at Exeter House in London, the son and first child of the future Anthony Ashley Cooper, 2nd Earl of Shaftesbury and his wife Lady Dorothy Manners, daughter of John Manners, 8th Earl of Rutland. Letters sent to his parents reveal emotional manipulation attempted by his mother in refusing to see her son unless he cut off all ties to his sickly and secluded father.

At the age of three Ashley-Cooper was made over to the formal guardianship of his grandfather. John Locke, as medical attendant to the Ashley household, was entrusted with the supervision of his education. It was conducted according to the principles of Locke's Some Thoughts Concerning Education (1693), and the method of teaching Latin and Greek conversationally was pursued by his instructress, Elizabeth Birch.

At the age of eleven, it is said, Ashley could read both languages with ease. Birch had moved to Clapham and Ashley spent some years there with her. In 1683, after the death of the first Earl, his father sent Lord Ashley, as he now was by courtesy, to Winchester College. Under a Scottish tutor, Daniel Denoune, he began a continental tour with two older companions, Sir John Cropley, 2nd Baronet, and Thomas Sclater Bacon.

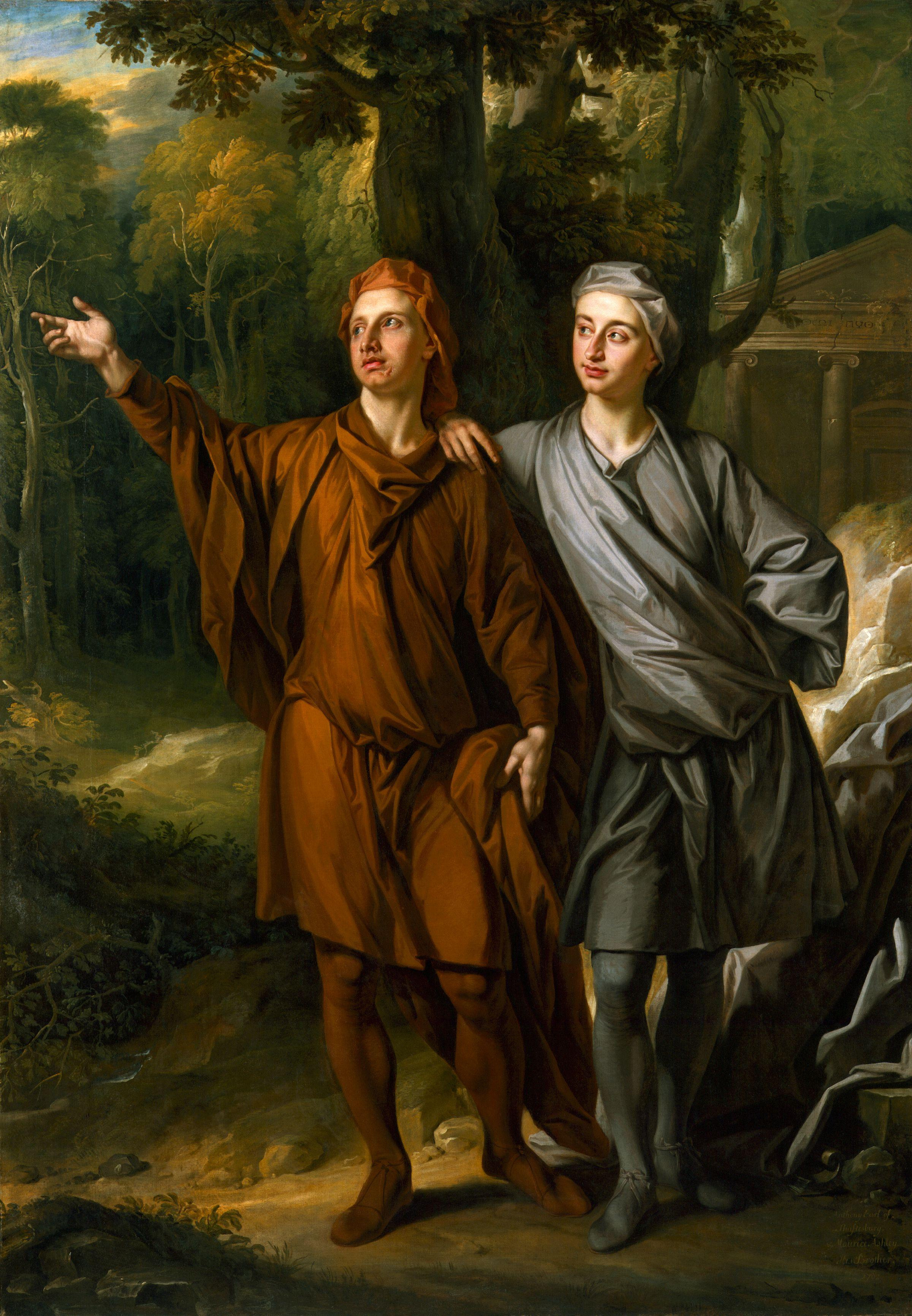
1700–1701 portrait of Cooper and his brother Maurice designed to illustrate Cooper's neoplatonist beliefs

== Under William and Mary ==
After the Glorious Revolution, Lord Ashley returned to England in 1689. It took five years, but he entered public life, as a parliamentary candidate for the borough of Poole, and was returned on 21 May 1695. He spoke for the Bill for Regulating Trials in Cases of Treason, one provision of which was that a person indicted for treason or misprision of treason should be allowed the assistance of counsel.

Although a Whig, Ashley was not partisan. His poor health forced him to retire from parliament at the dissolution of July 1698. He suffered from asthma. The following year, to escape the London environment, he purchased a property in Little Chelsea, adding a 50-foot extension to the existing building to house his bedchamber and Library, and planting fruit trees and vines. He sold the property to Narcissus Luttrell in 1710.

He was Lord Proprietor of the English colony of Carolina in North America and the Bahamas during this time.

Lord Ashley moved to the Netherlands. Away for over a year, Ashley returned to England, and shortly succeeded his father as Earl of Shaftesbury. He took an active part, on the Whig side in the House of Lords, in the January 1701 English general election, and again, with more success, in the November 1701 English general election.

== Under Queen Anne ==
After the first few weeks of Anne's reign, Shaftesbury, who had been deprived of the vice-admiralty of Dorset, returned to private life. In August 1703, he again settled in the Netherlands. At Rotterdam he lived, he says in a letter to his steward Wheelock, at the rate of less than £200 a year, and yet had much to dispose of and spend beyond convenient living.

Shaftesbury returned to England in August 1704, he landed at Aldeburgh, Suffolk having escaped a dangerous storm during his voyage. He had symptoms of consumption, and gradually became an invalid. He continued to take an interest in politics, both home and foreign, and supported England's participation in the War of the Spanish Succession.

The declining state of Shaftesbury's health rendered it necessary for him to seek a warmer climate and in July 1711 he set out for Italy. He settled at Naples in November, and lived there for more than a year.

== Death ==
Shaftesbury died at Chiaia in the Kingdom of Naples, on 15 February 1713 (N.S.) His body was brought back to England and buried at Wimborne St Giles, the family seat in Dorset.

== Associations ==
John Toland was an early associate, but Shaftesbury after some time found him a troublesome ally. Toland published a draft of the Inquiry concerning Virtue, without permission. Shaftesbury may have exaggerated its faults, but the relationship cooled. Toland edited 14 letters from Shaftesbury to Robert Molesworth, published in Toland in 1721. Molesworth had been a good friend from the 1690s and he regarded Molesworth as a mentor. Other friends among English Whigs were Charles Davenant, Andrew Fletcher of Saltoun, Walter Moyle, William Stephens and John Trenchard.

From Locke's circle in England, Shaftesbury knew Edward Clarke, Damaris Masham and Walter Yonge. In the Netherlands in the late 1690s, he got to know Locke's contact Benjamin Furly. Through Furly he had introductions to become acquainted with Pierre Bayle, Jean Leclerc and Philipp van Limborch. Bayle introduced him to Pierre Des Maizeaux. Letters from Shaftesbury to Benjamin Furly, his two sons, and his clerk Harry Wilkinson, were included in a volume entitled Original Letters of Locke, Sidney and Shaftesbury, published by Thomas Ignatius Maria Forster (1830, and in enlarged form, 1847).

Shaftesbury was a patron of Michael Ainsworth, a young Dorset man of Wimborne St Giles, maintained by Shaftesbury at University College, Oxford. The Letters to a Young Man at the University (1716) were addressed to Ainsworth. Others he supported included Pierre Coste and Paul Crellius.

== Works ==
Most of the works for which Shaftesbury is known were completed in the period 1705 to 1710. He collected a number of those and other works in Characteristicks of Men, Manners, Opinions, Times (first edition 1711, anonymous, 3 vols.). His philosophical work was limited to ethics, religion, and aesthetics where he highlighted the concept of the sublime as an aesthetic quality. Basil Willey wrote "his writings, though suave and polished, lack distinction of style".

=== Contents of the Characteristicks ===
This listing refers to the first edition. The later editions saw changes. The Letter on Design was first published in the edition of the Characteristicks issued in 1732.

Volume I The opening piece is A Letter Concerning Enthusiasm, advocating religious toleration, published anonymously in 1708. It was based on a letter sent to John Somers, 1st Baron Somers of September 1707. At this time repression of the French Camisards was topical. The second treatise is Sensus Communis: An Essay on the Freedom of Wit and Humour, first published in 1709. The third part is Soliloquy: or, Advice to an Author, from 1710.

Volume II It opens with Inquiry Concerning Virtue and Merit, based on a work from 1699. With this treatise, Shaftesbury became the founder of moral sense theory. It is accompanied by The Moralists, a Philosophical Rhapsody, from 1709. Shaftesbury himself regarded it as the most ambitious of his treatises. The main object of The Moralists is to propound a system of natural theology, for theodicy. Shaftesbury believed in one God whose characteristic attribute is universal benevolence; in the moral government of the universe; and in a future state of man making up for the present life.

Volume III Entitled Miscellaneous Reflections, this consisted of previously unpublished works. From his stay at Naples there was A Notion of the Historical Draught or Tablature of the Judgment of Hercules.

=== Philosophical moralist ===
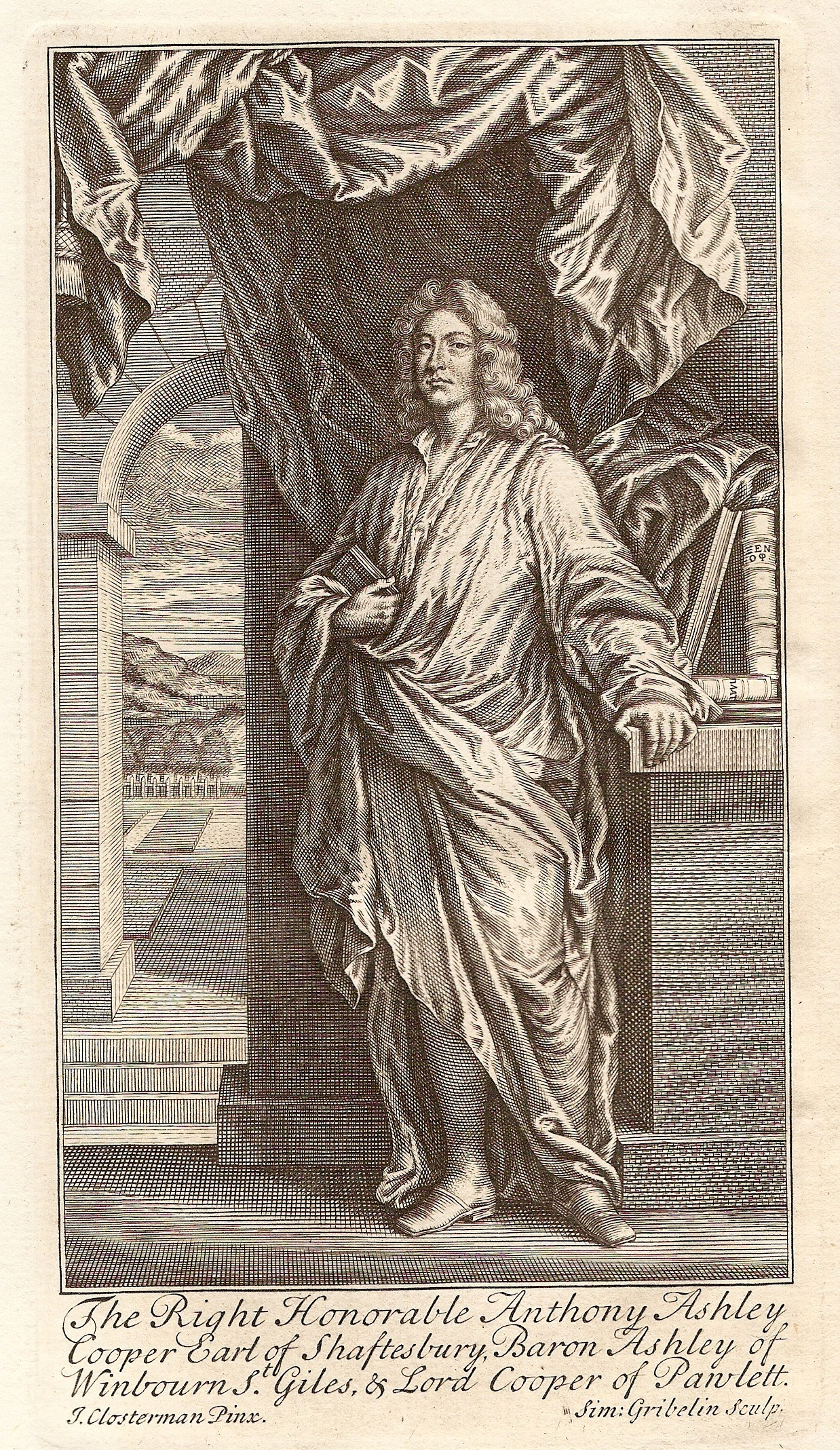
Engraving of Anthony Ashley Cooper in the first volume of Characteristicks from 1732

Shaftesbury as a moralist opposed Thomas Hobbes. He was a follower of the Cambridge Platonists, and like them rejected the way Hobbes collapsed moral issues into expediency. His first published work was an anonymous Preface to the sermons of Benjamin Whichcote, a prominent Cambridge Platonist, published in 1698. In it he belaboured Hobbes and his ethical egoism, but also the commonplace carrot and stick arguments of Christian moralists. While Shaftesbury conformed in public to the Church of England, his private view of some of its doctrines was less respectful.

His starting point in the Characteristicks, however, was indeed such a form of ethical naturalism as was common ground for Hobbes, Bernard Mandeville and Spinoza: appeal to self-interest. He divided moralists into Stoics and Epicurean, identifying with the Stoics and their attention to the common good. It made him concentrate on virtue. He took Spinoza and Descartes as the leading Epicureans of his time (in unpublished writings).

Shaftesbury examined man first as a unit in himself, and secondly socially. His major principle was harmony or balance, rather than rationalism. In man, he wrote,

"Whoever is in the least versed in this moral kind of architecture will find the inward fabric so adjusted, [...] that the barely extending of a single passion too far or the continuance [...] of it too long, is able to bring irrecoverable ruin and misery".

This version of a golden mean doctrine that goes back to Aristotle was savaged by Mandeville, who slurred it as associated with a sheltered and comfortable life, Catholic asceticism, and modern sentimental rusticity. On the other hand, Jonathan Edwards adopted Shaftesbury's view that "all excellency is harmony, symmetry or proportion".

On man as a social creature, Shaftesbury argued that the egoist and the extreme altruist are both imperfect. People, to contribute to the happiness of the whole, must fit in. He rejected the idea that humankind is naturally selfish; and the idea that altruism necessarily cuts across self-interest. Thomas Jefferson found this general and social approach attractive.

This move relied on a close parallel between moral and aesthetic criteria. In the English tradition, this appeal to a moral sense was innovative. Primarily emotional and non-reflective, it becomes rationalised by education and use. Corollaries are that morality stands apart from theology, and the moral qualities of actions are determined apart from the will of God; and that the moralist is not concerned to solve the problems of free will and determinism. Shaftesbury in this way opposed also what is to be found in Locke.

=== Reception ===
The conceptual framework used by Shaftesbury was representative of much thinking in the early Enlightenment, and remained popular until the 1770s. When the Characteristicks appeared they were welcomed by Le Clerc and Gottfried Leibniz. Among the English deists Shaftesbury was significant, plausible and the most respectable.

==== By the Augustans ====
In terms of Augustan literature, Shaftesbury's defence of ridicule was taken as an entitlement to scoff, and to use ridicule as a "test of truth". Clerical authors operated on the assumption that he was a freethinker. Ezra Stiles, reading Characteristicks in 1748 without realising Shaftesbury had been marked down as a deist, was both impressed and sometimes shocked. Around this time John Leland and Philip Skelton stepped up a campaign against deist influence, tarnishing Shaftesbury's reputation.

While Shaftesbury wrote on ridicule in the 1712 edition of Characteristicks, the modern scholarly consensus is that the uses of his views on it as a "test of truth" were a stretch. According to Alfred Owen Aldridge, the "test of truth" phrase is not to be found in Characteristicks; it was imposed on the Augustan debate by George Berkeley.

The influence of Shaftesbury, and in particular The Moralists, on An Essay on Man, was claimed in the 18th century by Voltaire (in his philosophical letter "On Pope"), Lord Hervey and Thomas Warton, and supported in recent times, for example by Maynard Mack. Alexander Pope did not mention Shaftesbury explicitly as a source: this omission has been understood in terms of the political divide, Pope being a Tory. Pope references the character Theocles from The Moralists in the Dunciad (IV.487–490):

"Or that bright Image to our Fancy draw,
Which Theocles in raptur'd vision saw,
While thro' Poetic scenes the Genius roves,
Or wanders wild in Academic Groves".

In notes to these lines, Pope directed the reader to various passages in Shaftesbury's work.

==== In moral philosophy and its literary reflection ====
Shaftesbury's ethical system was rationalised by Francis Hutcheson, and from him passed with modifications to David Hume; these writers, however, changed from reliance on moral sense to the deontological ethics of moral obligation. From there it was taken up by Adam Smith, who elaborated a theory of moral judgement with some restricted emotional input, and a complex apparatus taking context into account. Joseph Butler adopted the system, but not ruling out the place of "moral reason", a rationalist version of the affective moral sense. Samuel Johnson, the American educator, did not accept Shaftesbury's moral sense as a given, but believed it might be available by intermittent divine intervention.

In the English sentimental novel of the 18th century, arguments from the Shaftesbury–Hutcheson tradition appear. An early example in Mary Collyer's Felicia to Charlotte (vol.1, 1744) comes from its hero Lucius, who reasons in line with An Enquiry Concerning Virtue and Merit on the "moral sense". The second volume (1749) has discussions of conduct book material, and makes use of the Philemon to Hydaspes (1737) of Henry Coventry, described by Aldridge as "filled with favorable references to Shaftesbury." The eponymous hero of The History of Sir Charles Grandison (1753) by Samuel Richardson has been described as embodying the "Shaftesburian model" of masculinity: he is "stoic, rational, in control, yet sympathetic towards others, particularly those less fortunate." A Sentimental Journey Through France and Italy (1768) by Laurence Sterne was intended by its author to evoke the "sympathizing principle" on which the tradition founded by latitudinarians, Cambridge Platonists and Shaftesbury relied.

==== Across Europe ====
In 1745 Denis Diderot adapted or reproduced the Inquiry concerning Virtue in what was afterwards known as his Essai sur le Mérite et la Vertu. In 1769 a French translation of the whole of Shaftesbury's works, including the Letters, was published at Geneva.

Translations of separate treatises into German began to be made in 1738, and in 1776–1779 there appeared a complete German translation of the Characteristicks. Hermann Theodor Hettner stated that not only Leibniz, Voltaire and Diderot, but Gotthold Ephraim Lessing, Moses Mendelssohn, Christoph Martin Wieland and Johann Gottfried von Herder, drew from Shaftesbury.

Herder in early work took from Shaftesbury arguments for respecting individuality, and against system and universal psychology. He went on to praise him in Adrastea. Wilhelm von Humboldt found in Shaftesbury the "inward form" concept, key for education in the approach of German classical philosophy. Later philosophical writers in German (Gideon Spicker with Die Philosophie des Grafen von Shaftesbury, 1872, and Georg von Gizycki with Die Philosophie Shaftesbury's, 1876) returned to Shaftesbury in books.

== Legacy ==
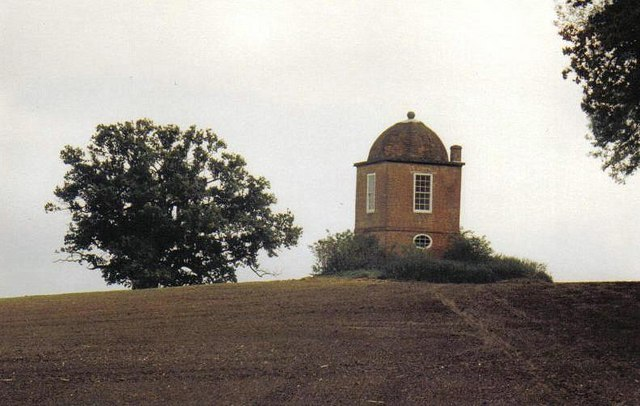
Philosopher's Tower on the Shaftesbury Estate

At the beginning of the 18th century, Shaftesbury built a folly on the Shaftesbury Estate, known as the Philosopher's Tower. It sits in a field, visible from the B3078 just south of Cranborne.

In the Shaftesbury papers that went to the Public Record Office are several memoranda, letters, rough drafts, etc.

A portrait of the 3rd Earl is displayed in Shaftesbury Town Hall.

== Family ==
Shaftesbury married in 1709 Jane Ewer, the daughter of Thomas Ewer of Bushey Hall, Hertfordshire. On 9 February 1711, their only child Anthony, the future fourth Earl was born.

His son succeeded him in his titles and republished Characteristicks in 1732. His great-grandson was the famous philanthropist, Anthony Ashley Cooper, 7th Earl of Shaftesbury.

== Publications of Shaftesbury ==
The following list of Shaftebury's principal publications has been sourced from The third Earl of Shaftesbury, 1671–1713 by Robert Voitle.

- The Danger of Mercenary Parliaments. 1698. With the collaboration of John Toland.
- Select Sermons of Dr. Whichcot[e]. London, 1698. Preface by Shaftesbury.
- An Inquiry Concerning Virtue, in Two Discourses. London, 1699.
- The Adept Ladys or The Angelick Sect. Being the Matters of fact of certain Adventures Spiritual, Philosophical, Political, and Gallant. In a Letter to a Brother. 1702.
- Paradoxes of State, Relating to the Present Juncture of Affairs in England and the rest of Europe; Chiefly grounded on his Majesty's Princely, Pious, and most Gracious Speech. London, 1702. With the collaboration of John Toland.
- The Sociable Enthusiast. A Philosophical Adventure Written to Palemon. [1704?]
- A Letter Concerning Enthusiasm, To My Lord *****. London, 1708.
- The Moralists, a Philosophical Rhapsody. Being a recital of certain conversations upon natural and moral subjects. London, 1709.
- Sensus Communis: An Essay on the Freedom of Wit and Humour. In a letter to a friend. London, 1709.
- Soliloquy: or, Advice to an Author. London, 1710.
- AΣKHMATA ["Exercises"). Written from 1698 to 1712. Edited by Benjamin Rand in 1900 in The Life, Unpublished Letters, and Philosophical Regimen of Anthony, Earl of Shaftesbury.
- Characteristicks of Men, Manners, Opinions, Times. 3 vols. London, 1711. [Second corrected edition, 1714.]
- Second Characters, or the Language of Forms. Largely written in 1712.
- A Letter Concerning the Art or Science of Design, written from Italy (on the occasion of Some Designs in Painting), to my Lord *****. [This appears in some copies of the 1714 edition of Characteristicks, and regularly from the 1732 edition on.]
- A Notion of the Historical Draught or Tablature of the Judgment of Hercules. 1713. [First printed in French in the November 1712 edition of the Journal des sçavans as "Raisonnement sur le tableau du jugement d'Hercule, selon l'histoire de Prodicus." It is in some copies of the 1714 edition of Characteristicks and most later ones.]
- Plasticks, or the Original Progress and Power of Designatory Art.
- Several Letters Written by a Noble Lord to a Young Man at the University. London, 1716.
- Letters from the Right Honourable the late Earl of Shaftesbury, to Robert Molesworth, Esq. ... with two letters written by the late Sir John Cropley. Ed. with an introduction by John Toland. London, 1721.
- Letters of the Earl of Shaftesbury. Collected into one volume, London, 1750.

== Notes ==
Attribution

Parliament of England
Preceded by Sir Nathaniel Napier, Bt; Sir John Trenchard	Member of Parliament for Poole with Sir Nathaniel Napier, Bt; 1695–1698	Succeeded by William Joliffe; Sir William Phippard
Peerage of England
Preceded by Anthony Ashley Cooper	Earl of Shaftesbury; 1699–1713	Succeeded by Anthony Ashley Cooper
