= John Coventry (Weymouth MP) =

British politician

Sir John Coventry (c. 1636–1685) was an English politician who sat in the House of Commons between 1667 and 1682.

Coventry was son of John Coventry (died 1652), the second son of lord keeper Thomas Coventry of Croome Park, Worcestershire. Between 1655 and 1659, he travelled on the continent with his tutor the poet Edward Sherburne. He matriculated at Queen's College, Oxford in 1660 and was made a Knight of the Bath at the coronation of Charles II, the following year.

In 1667, he went with his uncle Henry Coventry to the negotiations leading to the Treaty of Breda, ending the Second Anglo-Dutch War. That year and in the following parliaments of 1678, 1679 and 1681, he was elected for Weymouth. He followed Lord Ashley in politics, and was a fairly active member.

On 21 December 1670, owing to a jest made by Coventry in the House of Commons on the subject of the King's amours, Sir Thomas Sandys, an officer of the guards, with other accomplices, by the order of Monmouth, and (it was said) with the approval of the king himself, waylaid him as he was returning home to Suffolk Street and slit his nose to the bone. The outrage created an extraordinary sensation in the Commons, and in consequence Parliament debated a bill "to prevent malicious maiming and wounding" (22 & 23 Chas. II, c.1), a measure known as the "Coventry Act" was passed, declaring assaults accompanied by personal mutilation a felony without benefit of clergy, an Act not repealed until 1828.

Sir William Coventry, his uncle, spoke slightingly of him, ridicules his vanity and wished him out of the House of Commons to be "out of harm's way". The character of Amnon in John Dryden's Absalom and Achitophel (1681) is thought to be based on him.

He was suspected of having become a Roman Catholic while abroad in the 1650s and evidently was when he made his will in 1667. However, during the Exclusion Crisis, he sided with the party seeking the exclusion of the Duke of York from the king's presence.

He died unmarried.

== Notes ==
Parliament of England
Preceded by Sir William Penn; Bullen Reymes; Winston Churchill; Sir John Strangways	Member of Parliament for Weymouth and Melcombe Regis with Sir William Penn 1667–1670; Bullen Reymes 1667–1673; Winston Churchill 1667–1679; Lord Ashley 1670–1679; John Man 1673–1679; Thomas Browne 1679–1680; Michael Harvey 1679–1682; Sir John Morton 1679–1682; Henry Henning 1680–1682; 1667–1682	Succeeded by Michael Harvey; Sir John Morton; Henry Henning; George Strangways
Political offices
Preceded by The Earl of Marlborough	Custos Rotulorum of Somerset; 1636–1646	Succeeded by Interregnum
