= John Churchill (lawyer) =

English lawyer and politician (1600–1673)

Sir John Churchill
- Sir
- Churchill arms: Sable, a lion argent, a bend gules
- Born: 1600
- Died: 1673 (aged 72–73)
- Buried: St Andrew's Church, Bridport
- Noble family: Churchill
- Spouse: Sarah Winston
- Issue: Sir Winston Churchill
- Parents: Jasper Churchill; Elizabeth Chaplet
- Occupation: Lawyer, politician

Sir John Churchill (1600–1673) was an English lawyer and politician. His practice enjoyed great success during the 1630s and he was a member of the Middle Temple and deputy registrar of Chancery. He bought an estate at Newton Montacute near Sherborne in Dorset. During the English Civil War he supported Charles I and his son Sir Winston served as a Cavalier in the king's army while John, too old for military service, served Charles in a civil capacity. However, following the Battle of Naseby he withdrew his support for the king, sometime before the final Siege of Oxford. Nonetheless, the victorious Parliamentarians imposed fines of £840 on him, but he was permitted to keep his property.

He died in 1673 and was buried at St Andrew's Church, Bridport.

== Family ==
John Churchill was the son of Jasper Churchill and Elizabeth Chaplet. He had a younger brother also named Jasper. In 1618, he married Sarah Winston, the daughter of Sir Henry Winston of Gloucestershire. He was the father of Sir Winston Churchill, the grandfather of John Churchill, Duke of Marlborough, and the direct ancestor to Winston Churchill, who served as British prime minister during World War II.

== Bibliography ==
- Holmes, Richard. Marlborough: England's Fragile Genius. Harper Press, 2008.
