= Winston Churchill (Cavalier) =

English soldier, historian, and politician (1620–1688)

The Honourable Sir Winston Churchill FRS
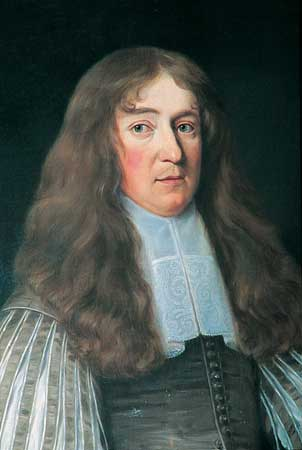
- Portrait of Sir Winston Churchill
- Born: 18 April 1620
- Died: 26 March 1688 (aged 67)
- Noble family: Churchill
- Spouse: Elizabeth Drake (m. 1648)
- Issue: 11, including: John Churchill, 1st Duke of Marlborough; George Churchill; Charles Churchill; Arabella Churchill
- Parents: Sir John Churchill; Sarah Winston
- Occupation: Soldier, historian, politician

Coat of arms: sable a lion rampant argent on a canton of the second a cross gules.

Sir Winston Churchill FRS (18 April 1620 – 26 March 1688), known as the Cavalier Colonel, was an English soldier, historian, and politician. He was the father of John Churchill, 1st Duke of Marlborough and a direct ancestor and eponym of Sir Winston Churchill, who served as British prime minister in the 20th century during the Second World War.

== Life and career ==
Churchill was the son of Sir John Churchill of Dorset, a lawyer and politician, and his wife Sarah Winston, daughter of Sir Henry Winston. Churchill was educated at St John's College, Oxford, but he left university without taking a degree. The main reason for it was the beginning of the Civil War.

Churchill was a fervent Royalist throughout his life. He fought and was wounded in the Civil War as a captain in the King's Horse and, after the Royalists were defeated, was forced to pay a recompense fee of £446 (equivalent to around £44,600 in the present day).

After the Restoration, he sat as a Member of Parliament for Weymouth and Melcombe Regis from 1661 to 1679 and for Lyme Regis from 1685 to 1688. He was also a Commissioner of the Irish Court of Claims and Explanations between 1662 and 1668, and a Junior Clerk Comptroller to the Board of Green Cloth from 1664 to 1679.

Churchill was knighted in 1664 and made a Fellow of the Royal Society the same year. He also published a history of the kings of England, entitled Divi Britannici; being a remark upon the Lives of all the Kings of this Isle, from the year of the World 2855 until the year of Grace 1660 (1675). He died in March 1688, at the age of 67.

== Marriage and children ==
On 26 May 1648, Churchill married Elizabeth Drake, daughter of Sir John Drake (d. 25 August 1636) and his wife, Eleanor Boteler, daughter of John Boteler, 1st Baron Boteler of Brantfield, and maternal niece of George Villiers, 1st Duke of Buckingham.

They had seven sons and four daughters.

Four of their children gained distinction:

- Arabella Churchill (1648–1730) became a mistress of King James II in about 1665 and was the mother of four of his children; among her descendants are Earl Waldegrave; the Earls Spencer; the Dukes of Berwick, and the later Dukes of Alba; Viscount Falmouth.
- John Churchill (1650–1722) became a famous military commander and was created Duke of Marlborough;
- George Churchill (1654–1710) became an admiral in the Royal Navy; and,
- Charles Churchill (1656–1714) became a general in the British Army under his eldest brother and married Mary Gould (she later married the 2nd Earl of Abingdon).

Of the other children:

- Mountjoy died in infancy;
- Winston died at the Battle of Solebay in 1672, aged 20;
- Jasper attended Queen's College, Oxford, and was commissioned in the Duke of York's Regiment in 1678, but he appears to have died soon thereafter; and,
- Theobald attended Queen's College, took holy orders, and was commissioned chaplain in the King's Own Royal Regiment of Dragoons, commanded then by his eldest brother, in November 1683, dying in 1685 at age 22.
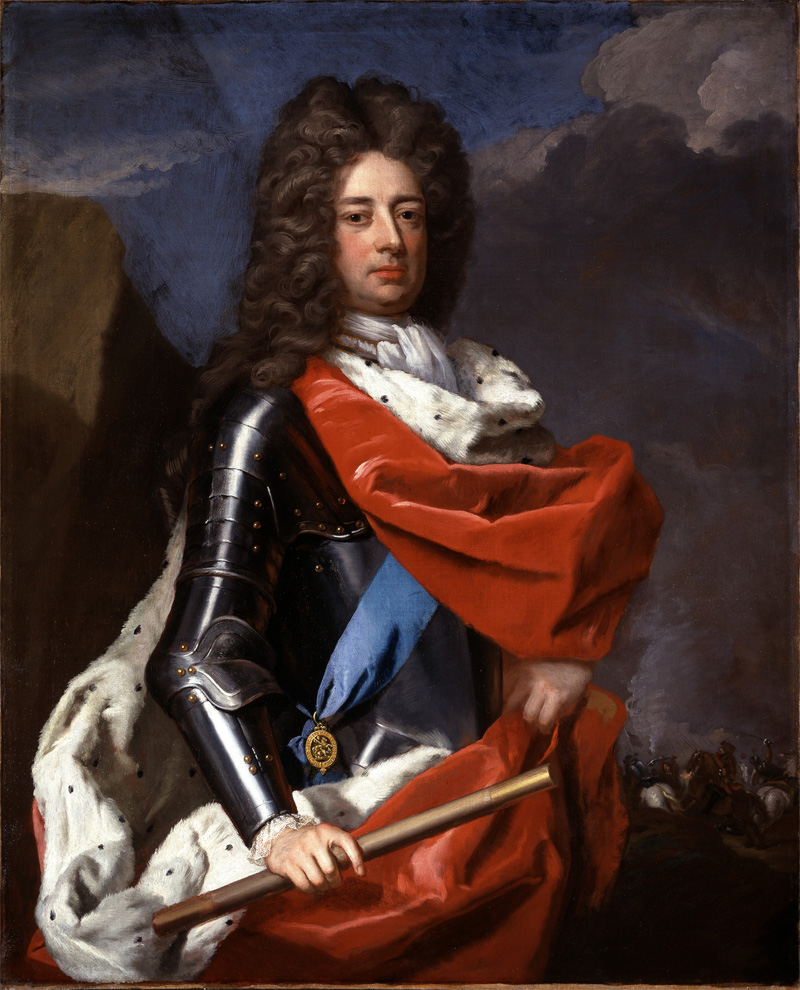
General John Churchill

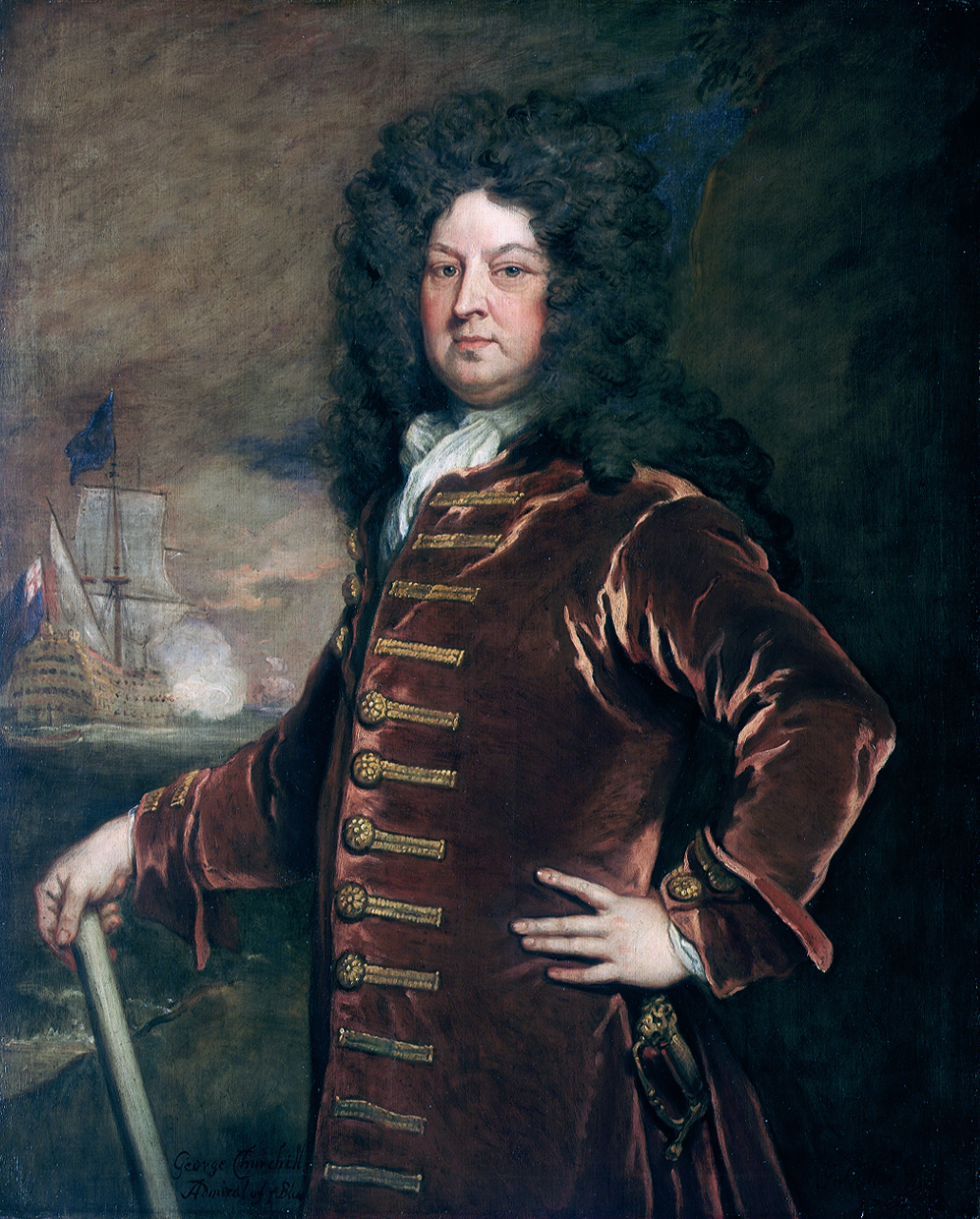
Admiral George Churchill

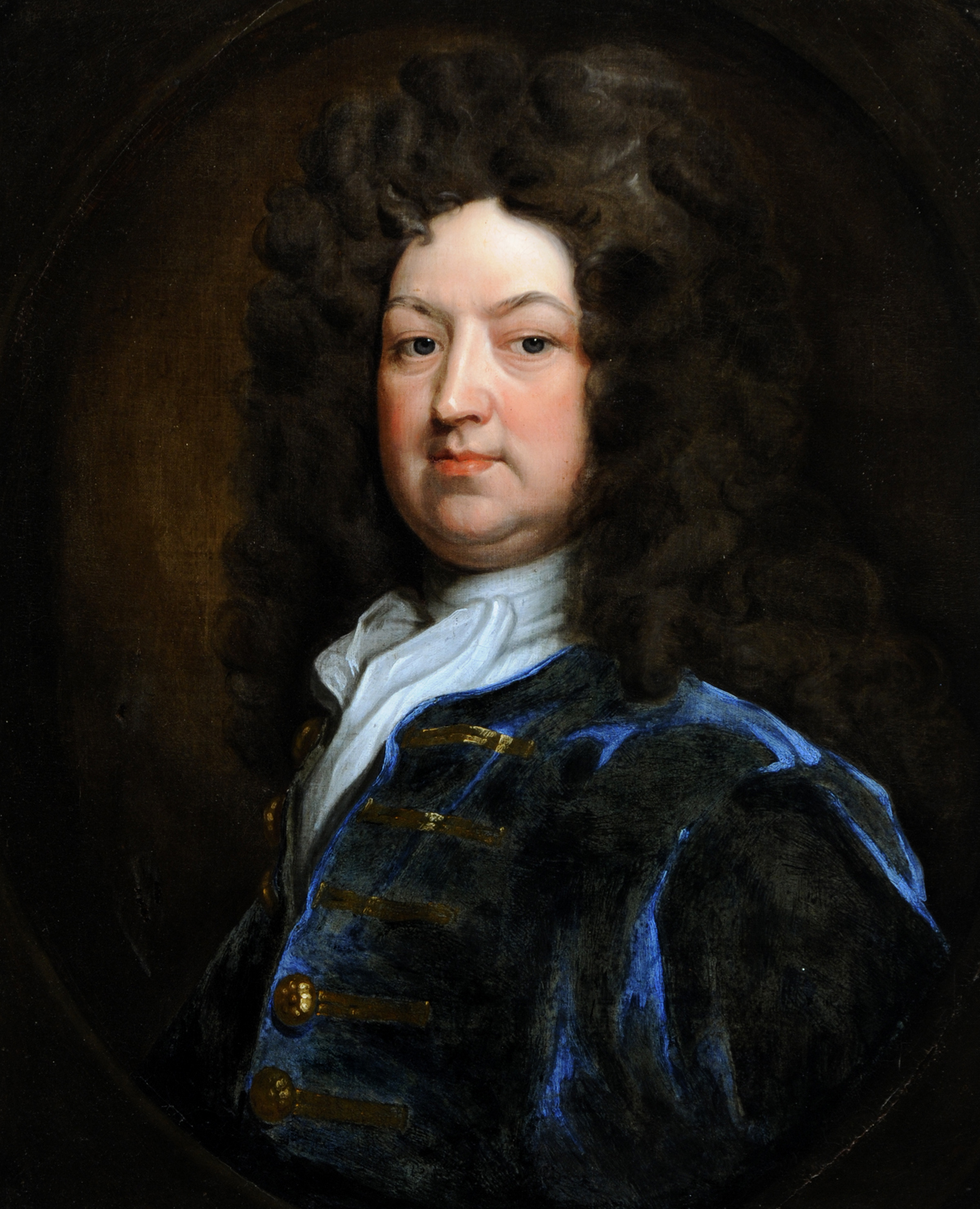
General Charles Churchill

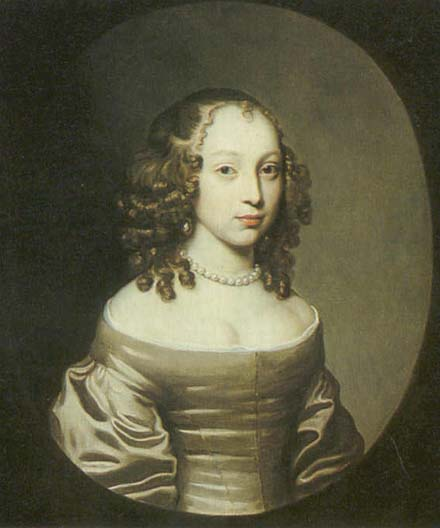
Lady Arabella Churchill

Parliament of England
| Preceded by Sir William Penn; Henry Waltham; Peter Middleton; Bullen Reymes | Member of Parliament for Weymouth and Melcombe Regis; 1661–1679; With: Sir William Penn 1661–1670; Bullen Reymes 1661–1673; Sir John Strangways 1661–1667; Sir John Coventry 1667–1679; Lord Ashley 1670–1679; Sir John Man 1673–1679 | Succeeded by Sir John Coventry; Lord Ashley; Thomas Browne; Michael Harvey |
| Preceded by Henry Henley; Thomas Moore | Member of Parliament for Lyme Regis; 1685–1688; With: John Pole | Succeeded by John Pole; John Burridge |
