= Edward Tatham =

English college head, clergyman and controversialist

Edward Tatham (1749–1834) was an English college head, clergyman and controversialist, Rector of Lincoln College, Oxford, from 1792 to his death.

== Life ==
Born at Milbeck, township of Dent, in the parish of Sedbergh, then in Yorkshire, and baptised at Dent on 1 October 1749, was the son of James Tatham of that parish. He was educated at Sedbergh School under Dr. Wynne Bateman, and was the Tatham who was admitted at Magdalene College, Cambridge, as sizar on 11 May 1767; but the entry does not give the Christian name of either father or son, and he presumably never went into residence. He entered as batler at Queen's College, Oxford, 15 June 1769, and graduated B.A. 1772, M.A. 1776.

Tatham took deacon's orders in 1776 and priest's orders in 1778, and the curacy of Banbury was his first charge. The fire at Queen's College in 1779 destroyed his books and some of his manuscripts, and he seems to have moved to Banbury. On 27 December 1781 he was elected to a Yorkshire fellowship at Lincoln College, Oxford, and became its acting tutor, proceeding B.D. in 1783 and D.D. in 1787.

On 6 November 1787, Tatham was elected sub-rector of Lincoln College, and on 15 March 1792 he was unanimously elected Rector. To this post was attached the rectory of Twyford, Buckinghamshire, with a right of residence at the rectory of Combe. He made improvements to the rectorial houses at Twyford and Combe, about ten miles from Oxford, and he is described as a contributor to the improvements at the college, presumably to the front quadrangle, which he gave incongruous battlements.

Tatham preached about 1802 a famous sermon, two hours and a half long, in defence of the disputed verse in St. John's first epistle (v. 7). Tatham concluded the discourse by leaving the subject to the learned bench of bishops, ‘who have little to do and do not always do that little.’ Usually at open war with his fellow members of the Hebdomadal Council, he vehemently opposed the views advocated by Cyril Jackson and the new examinations which had been instituted through his influence at the university. He issued in 1807 an ‘Address to the Members of Convocation on the proposed New Statute for Public Examinations,’ and it was followed by several pamphlets of a similar kind, including ‘Address to Lord Grenville on Abuses in the University’ (1811), and ‘Oxonia Purgata: a Series of Addresses on the New Discipline’ (1813).

In the closing years of his life, he chiefly lived at Combe rectory. He scarcely ever appeared at Oxford, unless it was to bring with him in his dogcart a pair of pigs of his own breeding for sale in the pig-market. Many caricatures and lampoons of him passed from hand to hand at Oxford, and he was known as ‘the devil’ who looked over Lincoln.

On the nomination of the trustees of the Bridgewater estate, Tatham, when a very old man, was appointed in 1829 to the rectory of Whitchurch, Shropshire. He died at the rectory-house in the parish of Combe on 24 April 1834, and was buried in the church of All Saints, Oxford, where a monument was erected by the widow to his memory.

== Works ==
Tatham's major work was his set of Bampton lectures, entitled The Chart and Scale of Truth by which to find the Cause of Error, vol. i. 1790, vol. ii. n.d. [1792]. A new edition, from the author's manuscripts at Lincoln College, and with a memoir, preface, and notes, by E. W. Grinfield, came out in 1840. This series of discourses embodied a new system of logic. His principle was that truth "becomes varied and modified as it passes through the human faculties", and that it pervades the various departments of general knowledge, being finally summed up in "the summum genus of knowledge, the knowledge of revealed theology". Edmund Burke called on Tatham soon after its publication, and expressed high approbation. Dr. Thomas Reid and David Doig admired it, and the article "Logic" in the fourth edition of the Encyclopædia Britannica was almost wholly taken from it. Tatham imitated the style of William Warburton.

Besides polemical sermons preached at Oxford, Tatham published:

- Oxonia Explicata et Ornata (anon.), 1773; 2nd edit. improved and enlarged (anon.), 1777. He anticipated the erection of a martyr's memorial, and advocated architectural improvements at Oxford. It would appear that he published about 1815 a further tract on Architectural Improvements in Oxford.
- Essay on Journal Poetry, 1778.
- Twelve Discourses introductory to the Study of Divinity, 1780.
- Letters to Burke on Politics, 1791; the first was on "the principles of government'", the second on "civil liberty". They contained some severe reflections on Joseph Priestley. On 1 July 1791 there appeared in the daily prints a letter from Tatham to the Revolution Society, declining an invitation to dinner.
- Letter to Pitt on the National Debt, 1795.
- Letter to Pitt on a National Bank, 1797.
- Letter to Pitt on the State of the Nation and the Prosecution of the War, 1797.
- Plan of Income-tax, 1802. He claimed to have invented the property tax of 1797.
- Observations on the Scarcity of Money and its Effects upon the Public; 3rd edit. 1816; reprinted in The Pamphleteer (vol. vii.). He argued that there was too little money in circulation, and that the bullion committee should have compelled the Bank of England to produce large coinages in gold and silver.
- Letter to Lord Grenville on the Metallic Standard, 1820; 2nd edit. 1820. He pleaded that bank-paper should be continued as legal tender, and that silver should be made the metallic standard.

== Family ==
He married, in 1801, Elizabeth, the wealthy daughter of John Cook of Cheltenham. She died on 24 August 1847, having founded at Lincoln College, in her husband's memory, a scholarship of the annual value of fifty guineas, limited in the first instance to candidates born or educated in Berkshire.

== Sources ==
- This article incorporates text from a publication now in the public domain: Lee, Sidney, ed. (1898). "Tatham, Edward". Dictionary of National Biography. Vol. 55. London: Smith, Elder & Co.

Academic offices
Preceded by John Horner	Rector of Lincoln College, Oxford; 1792–1834	Succeeded by John Radford
