= Anthony Ashley-Cooper, 2nd Earl of Shaftesbury =

English peer and Member of Parliament (1652-1699)

The Right Honourable The Earl of Shaftesbury
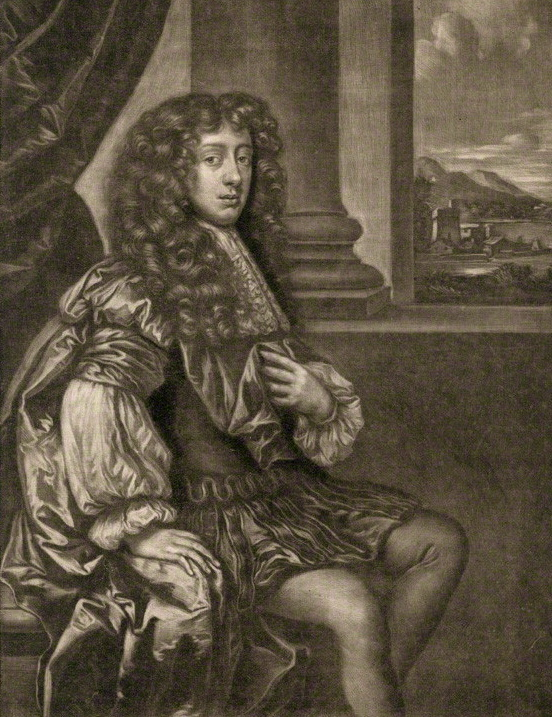
- The 2nd Earl of Shaftesbury

Member of Parliament for Weymouth and Melcombe Regis
- In office 1670–1679 Serving with Bullen Reymes (1670–1673); Winston Churchill (1670–1679); Sir John Coventry (1670–1679); John Man (1673–1679); Thomas Browne (1679); Michael Harvey (1679)
- Preceded by: Sir William Penn; Bullen Reymes; Winston Churchill; Sir John Coventry
- Succeeded by: Sir John Coventry; Thomas Browne; Michael Harvey; Sir John Morton

Personal details
- Born: 16 January 1652
- Died: 2 November 1699 (aged 47)
- Spouse: Lady Dorothy Manners (m. 1669; died 1698)
- Parents: Anthony Ashley-Cooper, 1st Earl of Shaftesbury (father); Lady Frances Cecil (mother)
- Relatives: John Manners (father-in-law); Anthony Ashley-Cooper (son); Maurice Ashley-Cooper (son)

Anthony Ashley-Cooper, 2nd Earl of Shaftesbury (16 January 1652 – 2 November 1699), known as Lord Ashley from 1672 to 1683, was an English peer and Member of Parliament.

Shaftesbury was the son of Anthony Ashley-Cooper, 1st Earl of Shaftesbury, and Lady Frances Cecil. He was elected to the House of Commons for Weymouth and Melcombe Regis in 1673, a seat he held until 1679. In 1683 he succeeded his father in the earldom and entered the House of Lords.

Lord Shaftesbury married Lady Dorothy Manners, daughter of John Manners, 8th Earl of Rutland, in 1669. He died in November 1699, aged 47, and was succeeded in his titles by his son Anthony, who became a noted philosopher and writer.

Parliament of England
Preceded by Sir William Penn; Bullen Reymes; Winston Churchill; Sir John Coventry	Member of Parliament for Weymouth and Melcombe Regis; 1670–1679; With: Bullen Reymes 1670–1673; Winston Churchill 1670–1679; Sir John Coventry 1670–1679; John Man 1673–1679; Thomas Browne 1679; Michael Harvey 1679	Succeeded by Sir John Coventry; Thomas Browne; Michael Harvey; Sir John Morton
Military offices
Vacant Title last held by Bullen Reymes	Vice-Admiral of Dorset; 1679–1699	Succeeded by Thomas Strangways
Peerage of England
Preceded by Anthony Ashley-Cooper	Earl of Shaftesbury; 1683–1699	Succeeded by Anthony Ashley-Cooper
