= John Radford =

John Radford may refer to:

- John B. Radford (1813–1872), American physician, businessman and namesake of Radford, Virginia
- John Radford (footballer) (born 1947), former English football player
- John Radford (broadcaster), Canadian broadcaster
- John Radford (politician) (1930–2001), Australian politician
- John Radford (wine writer) (1946–2012), British writer and broadcaster on wine and food
- John Radford (businessman) (born 1965), English football club chairman
- John Radford (Rector of Lincoln College, Oxford) (1782–1851), Oxford college head

== See also ==
- John Worboys (born 1957), British criminal, also known as John Radford
