= John Beke =

John Beke may refer to:

- John Beke (academic administrator) (fl. 1635), English academic
- John Beke, 1st Baron Beke (died c. 1303), British peer
