= Waddon Manor =

Historic house in Dorset, England

Coordinates: 50°40′14″N 2°32′20″W

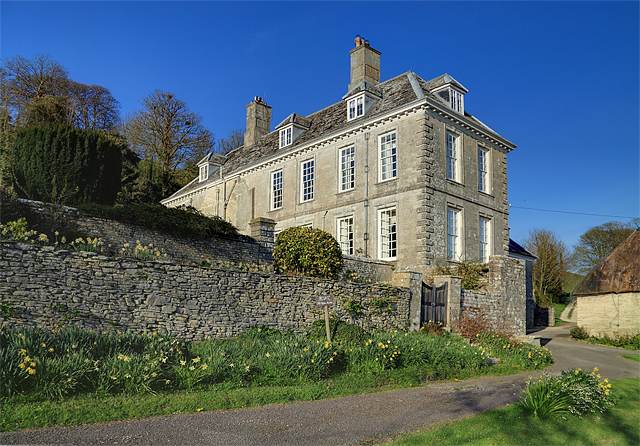
Waddon Manor in 2009

Waddon Manor is a grade I listed country house in Portesham, Dorset. An original house on the site was built by Bullen Rymes in around 1650, but the present house was built by Henry Chafin in around 1700.

In 1967, the house was featured in John Schlesinger's Oscar-nominated adaptation, Far From the Madding Crowd, as the home of William Boldwood, who was played by Peter Finch. The house was also photographed by John Piper, and that photograph is held at the Tate.
