= Bullen Reymes =

English courtier, diplomat and politician

Bullen Reymes (28 December 1613 – 18 December 1672) was an English courtier, diplomat and politician who sat in the House of Commons from 1660 to 1672. He fought in the Royalist army in the English Civil War.

== Life ==
Reymes was the eldest son of Bullen Reymes of Westminster and his wife Mary Petre, daughter of William Petre of Torbryan, Devon. He was educated privately and at Merton College, Oxford (BA 1670) and the Middle Temple.

He travelled abroad, where he was attaché at the Paris embassy from 1631 to 1632 and based in Venice (where he played the lute and 'red in Shakespeares playes') from 1634 to 1635 and 1636 to 1637. He also visited Sicily, met Artemisia Gentileschi in Naples and travelled as far as Athens, where he saw 'the beautiful ruins' before the disastrous 1687 explosion in the Parthenon. He was a captain of foot in 1640 and a Gentleman of the Privy Chamber from 1641 to 1646.

=== Civil war ===
He supported the King in the Civil War, and was colonel of horse in the Royalist army from 1643 to 1646. He was active in defending Exeter and was made a freeman in 1645. The city surrendered in 1646 and he laid down his arms. He was treated leniently by the committee for compounding for Dorset and paid no more than £100. In 1650, he was imprisoned in Taunton Castle and after the Battle of Worcester helped some Royalists to escape abroad. He succeeded to the heavily mortgaged estates of his father in 1652.

=== Later career ===
In June 1660, Reymes was elected Member of Parliament for Weymouth and Melcombe Regis in a by-election to the Convention Parliament. He resumed his position as gentleman of the privy chamber in the same month. He was servant to the Duke of Gloucester until September 1660, and was commissioner for assessment for Dorset from August 1660 to 1669. In 1661 he was re-elected MP for Weymouth and Melcombe Regis in the Cavalier Parliament, and proved to be a very active member. In the same year he became freeman of Weymouth and Vice Admiral of Dorset until his death. He was commissioner for loyal and indigent officers for Dorset in 1662, and commissioner for assessment for Westminster from 1663 to 1669. At this time he was involved in a feud with the Strangways family over various matters. He was commissioner for sick and wounded in Hampshire and Dorset 1664 to 1667 and was appointed commissioner for Tangier from 1664 until his death. He became a freeman of Portsmouth in 1665 and was deputy treasurer of prizes at Portsmouth from 1665 to 1667.

He had become a merchant of sailcloth, and was supplying sailcloth to the navy at the time of the second Dutch war when he had several minor administrative posts. In 1668 he became surveyor of the Great Wardrobe and achieved great savings after the mismanagement of the previous post holder. He was commissioner for sick and wounded for Hampshire and Dorset again from 1671 until his death. he was elected a Fellow of the Royal Society in 1667.

Reymes was friends with the diarists, Samuel Pepys and John Evelyn, and was a keen theatre-goer and gardener. He is mentioned six times in Pepys’ Diary. For instance, on 24 January 1668, Pepys wrote: "Sat by Colonell Reames, who understands and loves a play as well as I, and I love him for it."

In 1672 Reymes was unwell and retired to Dorset where, after a lingering illness, he died in December at the age of 68, and was buried in Portesham church. He was survived by his daughters but only one of his sons, also called Bullen (who died at Waddon after having been mysteriously found wounded in Weymouth in 1695).

=== Family ===
Reymes married Elizabeth Gerard, daughter of Thomas Gerard of Trent, Somerset in 1640 and had three sons and two daughters. Elizabeth died at Waddon, in Dorset, in 1661. Reymes remarried. His second wife, Anna, outlived him.

Parliament of England
Preceded by Edward Montagu; Sir William Penn; Peter Middleton; Henry Waltham	Member of Parliament for Weymouth and Melcombe Regis; 1660–1672; With: Henry Waltham 1660–1661; Peter Middleton 1660–1661; Sir William Penn 1660–1670; Sir John Strangways 1661–1666; Winston Churchill 1661–1672; Sir John Coventry 1667–1672; Lord Ashley 1670–1672	Succeeded by John Man; Lord Ashley; Winston Churchill; Sir John Coventry
