= Peter Middleton (MP) =

English merchant and politician (1603–1661)

Peter Middleton (1603–1661) was an English merchant and politician who sat in the House of Commons between 1659 and 1660.

== Early life ==
Middleton was the fourth son of Margaret Mounsel (a daughter of merchant John Mounsel, of Weymouth) and Robert Middleton, MP for Weymouth and Melcombe Regis and the City of London. After the death of his mother, his father married Eleanor (née Saltonstall) Harvie, the widow of Vincent Harvie and a daughter of Lord Mayor of London Sir Richard Saltonstall. Her sister, Elizabeth Saltonstall, was married to Richard Wyche, and her brother, Peter Saltonstall, was equerry at the court of James VI and I. Another sister, Hester Saltonstall, was married to Peter's uncle, Sir Thomas Myddelton, the parents of Thomas Myddelton, also an MP.

Among his large family were uncles Thomas Myddelton, a Lord Mayor of London, William Myddelton, a poet and seaman who died at Antwerp in 1621, and Sir Hugh Myddelton, 1st Baronet, a merchant and clothmaker who was appointed Royal Jeweller by King James VI and I.

== Career ==
In 1627 he became a Turkey merchant and joined the Levant and East India Companies. He was later living in Russia, where he was probably a buyer of furs. He held £1,000 stock in the East India Company, and was a member of the committee of the company from 1659 until his death.

In 1659, Middleton was elected Member of Parliament for Weymouth and Melcombe Regis in the Third Protectorate Parliament. He was re-elected MP for the constituency in 1660, when he was involved in a double return to the Convention Parliament but was accepted by the House on 5 May. He was one of the five MPs who were authorised to raise a loan of £2,000 in the City of London and who then funded the loan from their own pockets after they met with some difficulty. They received the thanks of the House on 25 May. He was a commissioner for assessment for London from August 1660. He stood for Weymouth and Melcombe Regis in 1661 but was defeated.

== Personal life ==
After 25 July 1657, Middleton was married to Mary Parry, widow of Fulke Parry, merchant tailor of London.

Middleton died at the age of about 58 and was buried at St Dunstan-in-the-East on 24 December 1661.

Parliament of England
Preceded by Denis Bond	Member of Parliament for Weymouth and Melcombe Regis; 1659; With: Walden Lagoe; John Trenchard; John Clark	Succeeded by William Sydenham
Preceded by William Sydenham	Member of Parliament for Weymouth and Melcombe Regis; 1660; With: Edward Montagu; Sir William Penn; Henry Waltham; Bullen Reymes	Succeeded by Sir William Penn; Bullen Reymes; Winston Churchill; Sir John Strangways
