= Henry Waltham =

English politician (died 1668)

Member of the House of Commons

Personal details
- Died: 1668
- Spouse: Ruth Lindsay (m. 1646)

Henry Waltham (died 1668) was an English politician who sat in the House of Commons in 1660, representing Weymouth and Melcombe Regis.

Waltham was the son of Henry Waltham of Weymouth, who was MP in 1628. He was in business supplying naval stores. On the outbreak of the Civil War, he joined the parliamentary army. He was made a freeman of Weymouth in 1647. He was an alderman from 1649 to 1662 and served as mayor from 1657 to 1658. In 1658 he was commissioner for sequestrations for Dorset. He stood unsuccessfully for parliament at Weymouth in 1659, but was elected Member of Parliament for Weymouth and Melcombe Regis in 1660 for the Convention Parliament. He did not stand in 1661 and in 1662 he refused oaths and was removed from the corporation.

Waltham married Ruth Lindsay, daughter of Edward Lindsay, a merchant of Weymouth, before 1646.

Parliament of England
Preceded by William Sydenham	Member of Parliament for Weymouth and Melcombe Regis; 1660; With: Edward Montagu; Sir William Penn; Peter Middleton; Bullen Reymes	Succeeded by Sir William Penn; Bullen Reymes; Winston Churchill; Sir John Strangways
