= Edward Sherburne =

English translator and poet (1618-1702)

Sir Edward Sherburne
- Born: 1618; Cripplegate, London, England
- Died: 1702 (aged 83–84); England
- Occupations: Poet, translator, royalist
- Writing career
- Language: English

Sir Edward Sherburne (18 September 1618 – 4 November 1702) was an English poet, translator, and royalist soldier of the seventeenth century.

== Early life ==
Edward Sherburne was born 18 September 1618 in Goldsmith Rents, Cripplegate, London, the son of another Sir Edward Sherburne (1578–1641), a civil servant and secretary of the East India Company, and his wife Frances (1588-1673), a daughter of John Stanley of Roydon Hall, Essex. His father, a descendant of the Sherburnes of Stonyhurst, had moved from Oxford to London to be employed as agent to Sir Dudley Carleton (later Viscount Dorchester); he was later employed as secretary to Nicholas Bacon (Lord Keeper) from 1617 to 1621, as secretary of the East India Company from 1621, and finally as Clerk of the Ordnance of the Tower of London from 1626.

The younger Edward was tutored first under Thomas Farnaby and later Charles Alleyn, until the latter's death in 1640. Thereupon he attempted an abortive tour of France and Italy, returning in late 1641 upon the news of the grave illness of his father, who died in December of that year. He succeeded his father as Clerk of the Ordnance, having obtained the reversion of that office in 1637–1638.

== Civil War ==
Due to his staunch royalist and Roman Catholic views, Sherburne was removed as Clerk of the Ordnance by order of the House of Lords at the outbreak of the civil war. For the following months he was prisoner in the custody of the usher of the black rod until his release in October of that year, whereupon he joined the forces of the king at Oxford. On the surrender of Oxford, in June 1646, he moved to London to live in Middle Temple with his kinsman Thomas Povey. He also asserted, in petitioning for compensation in 1661, that he 'kept the train of ordnance together, to serve as a troop in the field in the decline of the late king's cause* and preserved the ordnance records, so that it is now restored to its primitive order and constitution'.

Now living in near poverty—due to the seizure of his estate and considerable library—he obtained the acquaintance of several notable literary figures of the day, including his kinsman the author Thomas Stanley, the dramatist James Shirley, and latterly of the collector and naturalist Sir Hans Sloane. It was at this stage that he began the truly literary portion of his life, devoting a great deal of time to scholarship of the classics and publishing his first independent published works in 1648, both translations in verse of Seneca the Younger: "Medea, a Tragedie, written in Latine, by Lucius Annæus Seneca" and "Seneca's Answer to Lucius his Quære: Why Good Men suffer Misfortunes, seeing there is a Divine Providence". The latter contained a dedication to the 'King of Sorrows' Charles I, then captive on the Isle of Wight, who may detect "a glympse of Your own invincible Patience and inimitable Magnanimity; in bearing and ever-mastering Mis-fortunes" carefully omitting the continuing line "being a Stoicall Exhortation to the Anticipation of Death".

== Interregnum ==
Following the execution of the king in January 1649, Sherburne moved from London, along with Thomas Stanley, staying at the country homes of the latter's relations in Cumberlow Green, Hertfordshire and Flower, Northamptonshire. His budding French and Italian scholarship, greatly encouraged by Stanley, bore fruit in his 1651 "Poems and Translations Amorous, Lusory, Morall, Divine" dedicated to Stanley.

Sherburne was then enlisted as a tutor to the young Sir George Savile (later the Marquess of Halifax), and was linked at this time with the steward (of the same name) of Rufford Abbey who was involved in the Penruddock uprising. On the recommendation of Savile's mother, he was then attached as tutor to John Coventry, accompanying him on an extensive trip through "All France, Italy, some Part of Hungary, the Greater Part of Germany, Holland, and the Rest of the low Countries, and Flandres, returning Home about the End of October 1659".

== Post-Restoration ==
At the Restoration Sherburne was restored to his office as Clerk of the Ordnance, and references in state papers suggest that he continued to be a diligent public servant. In this role he was principal author of the Rules, Orders, and Instructions given to the office of ordnance in 1683, which continued in use largely unaltered until the office was abolished in 1857. Near the time of the Popish Plot efforts were made to remove him on grounds of religion, but he was supported by the king, by whom he was granted a knighthood on 6 January 1682.

At the time of the Glorious Revolution Sherburne was unable to swear the new oaths on grounds of his Roman Catholicism, and was forced to retire. As his petition to the then Master-General of the Ordnance the Earl of Romney went unanswered, it is likely he was supported in his final years by his cousin Sir Nicholas Sherburne of Stonyhurst Hall. He died on 4 November 1702 and is buried in the chapel of the Tower.

== Legacy ==
Sherburne's literary reputation rests principally on his work as a translator. His poems, rare in number and largely unoriginal, serve largely to illuminate the literary fashions of the day, rather than stand as model works in their own right.

Among his works was a book entitled, The Sphere of Marcus Manilius Made an English Poem: With Annotations and an Astronomical Appendix, which foraged into the mathematical sciences, documenting and sharing the depth to his knowledge of both ancient and modern concerns held by astronomers up to around 1675. The work ends with his exhortations to the reader to support the establishment of an English astronomical observatory, as was concurrently being championed by his colleague, Jonas Moore.

== Other works and translations ==
Books:

- Medea: a Tragedie. Written in Latine by Lucius Annévs Seneca. English'd by E. S. Esq; with Annotations (London: Printed for Humphrey Moseley, 1648).
- Seneca's Answer to Lvcilivs his Qvære; Why Good Men suf er Misfortunes seeing there is a Divine Providence? Written Originally in Latine Prose, and Now Translated into English Verse, By E.S. Esq. (London: Printed for Humphrey Moseley, 1648).
- Poems and Translations amorous, lusory, morall, divine (London: Printed by William Hunt for Thomas Dring, 1651); republished as Salmacis, Lyrian & Sylvia, Forsaken Lydia, The Rape of Helen, A Comment thereon, With Severall other Poems and Translations (London: Printed by William Hunt for Thomas Dring, 1651).
- The Sphere of Marcus Manilius Made an English Poem: With Annotations and an Astronomical Appendix. By Edward Sherburne, Esquire (London: Printed for NathanaelBrooke, 1675).
- Troades, or, The Royal Captives. A Tragedy, written Originally in Latin by Lucius Annæus Seneca, the Philosopher. English'd by Edward Sherburne, Esq; with Annotations (London: Printed by Anne Godbid & John Playford for SamuelCarr, 1679).
- The Comparison of Pindar and Horace, Written in French by Monsieur Blondel, Master in Mathematicks to the Dauphin, English'd By Sir Edward Sherburne, Kt. (London: Printed for Thomas Bennet, 1696).
- The Tragedies of L. Annæus Seneca the Philosopher; viz. Medea, Phædra and Hippolytus, Troades, or the Royal Captives, and The Rape of Helen, out of the Greek of Coluthus; Translated into English Verse; with Annotations. To which is prefixed the Life and Death of Seneca the Philosopher; with a Vindication of the said Tragedies to Him, as their Proper Author. (London: Samuel Smith and Benjamin Walford, 1701; reprinted, 1702; facsimile of 1702 printing, New York: AMS, 1976).

Preceded by Edward Sherburne (died 1641)	Clerk of the Ordnance; December 1641 – August 1642	Succeeded by John White
