= William Stephens (minister) =

William Stephens (c. 1647–1718) was an English cleric.

== Life ==
Stephens obtained his Master of Arts at St Edmund Hall, Oxford, in 1671, and his Bachelor of Divinity in 1678. He became rector (1690) of Sutton, Surrey, now part of London.

His pamphlet, "An Account of the Growth of Deism in England" (1696), provides some information on early English deism, which he describes as an unintended consequence of the foreign education of young gentlemen. He claims that, when they return home, the trappings of the Church of England remind such men of the powerful Catholic Church they were warned to distrust. In this way he linked the lack of religious tolerance with the growth of religious skepticism.

A strong Whig he was regarded as one of the radical whig Commonwealthmen.

On 30 January 1700 he was asked to preach the traditional sermon before the House of Commons of England in memory of Charles I. (He had delivered a sermon on the same occasion six years earlier, before the Lord Mayor.) He omitted the prayer for the King and Royal Family, and his comments, which included a suggestion that the sermons be discontinued, resulted in a vote of censure from a strongly Tory Parliament. The text was reprinted in 1752.

A later pamphlet, "A Letter to the Author of the Memorial of the Church of England" (1707), resulted in a fine of 100 marks, and he narrowly escaped time in the pillory.

== Bibliography ==
- "A sermon preached before the Right Honourable the Lord Mayor, and aldermen of the city of London at St. Mary-Le-Bow, Jan. 30th, 1693/4"
- "An Account of the Growth of Deism in England" (1696)
- "A sermon preach'd before the Honourable House of Commons, January 30, 1699/1700 being an anniversary sermon for the day"
- "A sermon preached at the Temple-Church on Sunday, the 18th of February 1699/1700"
- "A Letter to the Author of the Memorial of the Church of England" (1707)
