= Simon McKie =

Simon McKie is the chairman and a designated member of McKie & Co (Advisory Services) LLP. He is also a writer and lecturer on taxation and other matters and a contributor to the charitable and technical activities of a number of professional bodies.

McKie was educated at Christ's Hospital and at Lincoln College, Oxford, where he studied English Language and Literature. He subsequently qualified as a Chartered Accountant, Chartered Tax Adviser, Barrister and Trust and Estate Practitioner.

McKie has specialised in private client taxation since the early 1980s. He was formerly a Director of Rathbones, a partner in, and head of, the City tax practice of, Robson Rhodes (chartered accountants) and the Head of Taxation at Coutts & Co.

== Contribution to wider professional life ==
McKie has sat on a large number of professional committees, including the technical committees of the Chartered Institute of Taxation and the Faculty of Taxation Currently he sits on the Technical Committee of the Society of Trust & Estate Practitioners. He has sat on a number of joint committees of the tax profession and her Majesty's Revenue and Customs (and its predecessor bodies) including the 'Tax Law Rewrite Consultative Committee'. He has been an elected member of the governing Council of the Institute of Chartered Accountants in England & Wales. He is a former Chairman of the Faculty of Taxation, of the Faculty's Inheritance Tax and Trusts Sub-Committee and of the Capital Taxes Sub-Committee of the Chartered Institute of Taxation. He is a current member of the Capital Gains Tax and Investment Income Sub-Committee and the Succession Taxes Sub-Committee of the Chartered Institute of Taxation.

== Technical writing and lectures ==
McKie on Statutory Residence has been described as the book 'to which the tax scholars of the future will turn for an example of how we made law in the early part of the 21st century', and as 'the authoritative introduction to an area of continuing importance'.

McKie was formerly on the editorial boards of Taxation, the Tax Journal and TAXline and was the Capital Gains Tax correspondent of Private Client Business.

With his wife, Sharon McKie, he writes and edits an e-magazine on private client taxation entitled the 'Rudge Revenue Review'. He also writes a blog on taxation matters of relevance to private clients and their advisers entitled the 'Hissing Goose'.

=== Shortlistings in Taxation Awards ===
McKie has been shortlisted for the award of Tax Writer of the Year in Taxation magazine's annual Taxation Awards in every year from 2010 to the latest year, 2015.

== Other writings ==
=== On cider making ===
McKie has also written a guide to cider making entitled Making Craft Cider – A Ciderist's Guide

== Foundation and chairmanship of McKie & Co ==
=== History and structure ===
On leaving Coutts & Co (where he was Head of Taxation), McKie established a practice under the name McKie & Co on 1 November 1998 to provide taxation consultancy advice on matters of taxation affecting the private client, primarily to accountants, solicitors and other advisers of private clients. McKie & Co (Advisory Services) LLP ('MCLLP'), a limited liability partnership which was registered in England and Wales under registration number OC300925, succeeded to the practice of McKie & Co on 1 January 2002. The members and designated members of MCLLP are Sharon McKie and Simon McKie.

=== Awards ===
MCLLP has twice won the Award of Tax Consultancy Firm of the Year in Taxation magazine's Taxation Awards most recently in 2012 and 2015. It won the award for the Boutique Firm of the Year in the Society of Trust and Estate Practitioners Awards in 2009/2010 being short listed again in 2013/2014.

=== Services ===
The services which MCLLP provides to its clients fall into three categories.

First, it provides bespoke direct taxation advice to solicitors, accountants and other advisers of private clients throughout the country and overseas, covering all of the United Kingdom direct taxation issues which face private clients and advice on the interaction of UK direct taxation with the taxation of other jurisdictions. Secondly, it provides litigation support in respect of private client taxation and its principals act as expert witnesses. It provides guidance on any direct taxation issues concerning the private client which are at issue in a dispute, in particular in litigation with HMRC or involving allegations of professional negligence. It provides advice and support in respect of mediation. Thirdly, McKie & Co provides bespoke taxation advice to private clients in respect of their taxation affairs and dealings with Her Majesty's Revenue & Customs.
