= Francis Kyte =

English painter

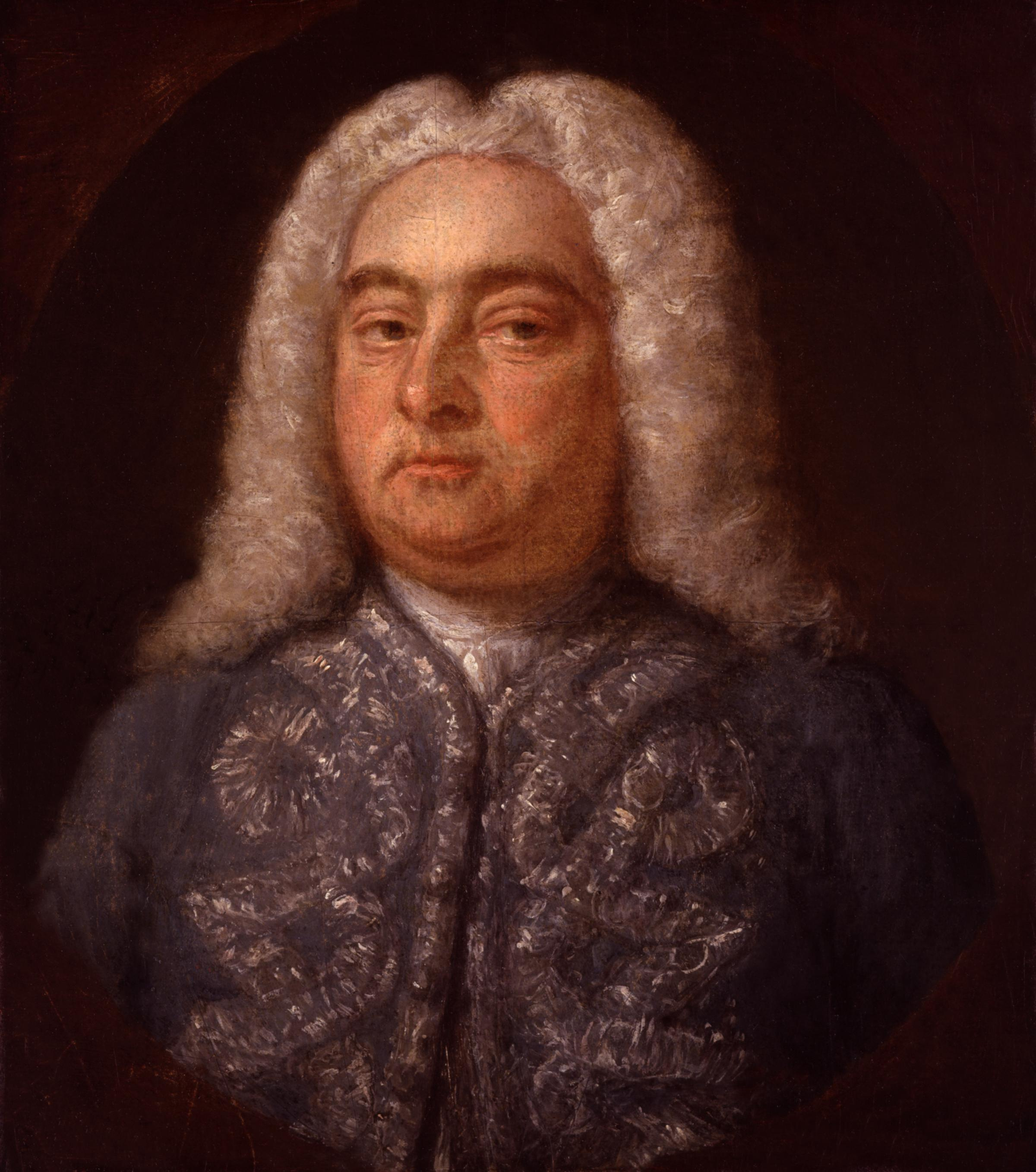
George Frederick Handel, by Francis Kyte

Francis Kyte (active 1710 – 1744) was an English engraver and portrait painter.

Having worked for two decades as a mezzotint engraver, producing portraits of famous or fashionable people for the publishing trade in London, in particular for printsellers Edward Cooper and later also for John Bowles, for whom he made 32 mezzotint portraits for Bowles' "Worthies of Britain" series. During the 1740s Kyte began painting portraits himself. Kyte's portrait of George Frederick Handel is on view at the Handel House Museum, London.
