= William Chamberleyn =

William Chamberleyn (died 7 March 1434) was an Oxford college head in the 15th-century.

Chamberleyn was the inaugural rector of Lincoln College, Oxford.

Academic offices
Preceded by New foundation	Rector of Lincoln College, Oxford; 1429–1434	Succeeded by John Beke
