= John Tristropp =

Oxford college head

John Tristropp (died 1479) was an Oxford college head in the 15th-century.

Tristropp had been a Fellow of Lincoln College, Oxford from as early as 1445, and was elected its Rector in 1461. He died in December 1479 and is buried at St Michael's Church, Oxford. He also served as rector of Rousham, Oxfordshire from 1456 to 1462.

Academic offices
Preceded by John Beke	Rector of Lincoln College, Oxford; 1461–1479	Succeeded by George Strangways
