= George Strangways =

George Strangways, was an Oxford college head in the 15th century.

Strangways became a Fellow of Lincoln College, Oxford in 1474 and was elected its Rector in January 1480. He resigned the Rectorship in 1488. He later became Archdeacon of Coventry and was a chaplain to king Henry VII. He is buried at St Michael's Church, Oxford.

Academic offices
Preceded by John Tristropp	Rector of Lincoln College, Oxford; 1480–1488	Succeeded by William Bethome
