= Thomas Brinknell =

Thomas Brinknell or Brynknell (died 1539?), was a professor at Oxford.

Brinknell was educated at Lincoln College, Oxford and was appointed head-master of the school attached to Magdalen College, where he 'exercised an admirable way of teaching.' He afterwards studied for a time at University College, and became intimate with Cardinal Wolsey. He proceeded B.D. in 1501, and D.D. on 13 March 1507/1508, 'at which time,' says Anthony a Wood 'the professor of div. or commissary did highly commend him for his learning.' On 7 January 1510/1511 he was collated to a prebend in Lincoln Cathedral, and on the same date was made master of the hospital of St. John at Banbury. In 1521 he was nominated professor of divinity on Cardinal Wolsey's new foundation. He apparently died in 1539. He was the author of a treatise against Martin Luther, which does not seem to have been printed. According to Wood it was 'a learned piece,' and 'commended for a good book.' Wolsey recommended Brinknell to Henry VIII as 'one of those most fit persons in the university to encounter Mart. Luther.'
