= Thomas Bank =

Senior academic at the University of Oxford

Thomas Bank, STP was an Oxford college head in the 16th-century.

He was Rector of Lincoln College, Oxford, from 1493 to 1503; and Vice-Chancellor of the University of Oxford from 1501 to 1502.
