= St Andrew's Church, Bridport =

Church in Dorset, England

St Andrew's Church
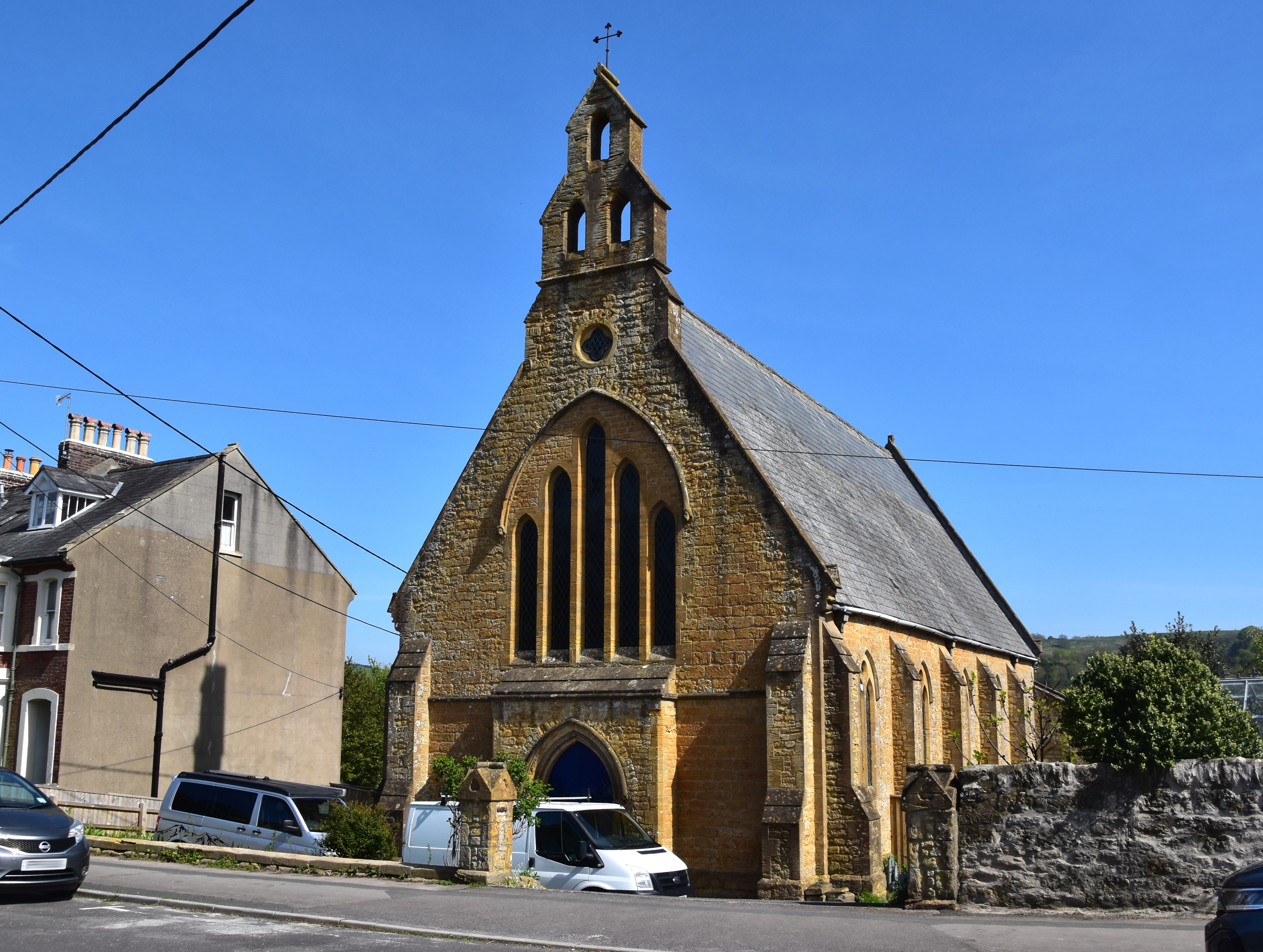
- St Andrew's Church

Religion
- Affiliation: Church of England
- Ecclesiastical or organizational status: Redundant
- Year consecrated: 1860

Location
- Location: Bridport, Dorset, England
- Interactive map of St Andrew's Church
- Coordinates: 50.7351°N 2.7501°W

Architecture
- Architect: Thomas Talbot Bury
- Type: Church

St Andrew's Church is a former Church of England church in Bridport, Dorset, England. It was built in 1858–60 to the designs of Thomas Talbot Bury and has been a Grade II listed building since 1975.

== History ==
St Andrew's was built in the parish of Bradpole, specifically to serve the outlying part of the village and the growing population within the north-east region of Bridport. As Bradpole's Holy Trinity Church was an inconvenient distance for some residents and often filled to capacity for services, a chapel of ease was proposed for the area. Through the efforts of the vicar of the parish, Rev. A. Broadley, the cost of the church was raised by private subscription, including a £500 donation from Miss Strong, and grants from the Diocesan Church Building Society and Incorporated Society in London.

The tender of Messrs Chick and Son of Beaminster was accepted for £1,079 and the foundation stone laid by the Bishop of Salisbury, Rev. Walter Kerr Hamilton, on 21 August 1858. The masonry work was undertaken by Mr. Gibbs of Bradpole. St Andrew's was consecrated by the Bishop of Salisbury on 27 September 1860. It continued to serve the parish until the church was made redundant on 1 August 1978 and sold to a private owner for light industrial use as a workshop and store.

== Architecture ==
St Andrew's is built of coursed and squared limestone, sourced from quarries in Powerstock, and ashlar dressings of Ham stone, in an Early English style. It has a roof of blue slate, with a bellcote containing three openings. Built to accommodate 300 persons, the interior is made up of a five-bay nave, measuring 80 by 26 feet, a two-bay chancel, measuring 24 by 18 feet, a lean-to vestry and organ chamber.

The church's original furnishings included benches of stained deal, a carved communion table of oak, donated by the Bishop of Salisbury, and a pulpit and font of Ham stone. The chancel's fittings were carved from oak, with the floor laid with encaustic tiles from Mintons and Poole potteries. The mural decorations of the chancel were created by Mrs. Broadley and friends. The church's stained glass windows were created by Heaton and Butler of London. Another stained glass window was installed in 1868, created by Heaton, Butler and Bayne.

In their 2002 inspection of the interior, Historic England recorded that "extensive" alterations and removals had taken place. The font had been removed but other features, including the pulpit and altar, remained. Some stained glass remained in the chancel, although other examples had either been donated to the Stained Glass Museum of Ely Cathedral in 1979 or installed in St John's Church at West Bay.
