= Peter Eugene McCullough =

British-based American academic and educator

Peter Eugene McCullough is Sohmer Fellow, and head of English literature at Lincoln College, Oxford University. He specializes in Early Modern Religious writing, particularly that of Lancelot Andrewes and John Donne. He is Lay Canon (History) at St Paul's Cathedral, London.

== Education ==
Born and raised in northern California, McCullough attended Nevada Union High School in Grass Valley, California. He earned his first degree in 1987 from UCLA, followed by a PhD (1992) and two years of post-doctoral teaching at Princeton University (1994–97). He was a Junior Research Fellow at Trinity College, Oxford, and taught various classes and tutorials on the topics of English Literature from 1509-1642 and English Literature from 1642-1740. His undergraduate degree was from the UCLA and he earned his PhD from Princeton University.

== Work ==
Following his PhD, he took a Junior Research Fellowship at Trinity College, Oxford, in 1994. Afterwards, he received a Fellowship from Lincoln College for teaching and research where he remains. His work appeared in the Huntington Library Quarterly.

He is currently chief editor and contributor for a 14 volume work on John Donne.

== Personal ==
McCullough lives in Oxford, England, with his partner.

== Bibliography ==
- Julia M. Walker, ed. (1998). "Out of Egypt". Dissing Elizabeth: negative representations of Gloriana. Duke University Press. ISBN 978-0-8223-2074-6.
- Sermons At Court. Cambridge University Press. 1998. ISBN 978-0-521-59046-4.
- Peter E. McCullough; Lori Anne Ferrell, eds. (2000). The English Sermon Revised: Religion, Literature and History 1600-1750. Manchester University Press.
- Lancelot Andrewes: Selected Sermons and Lectures. Oxford University Press. 2005. ISBN 978-0-19-818774-5.

== Reviews ==
- "Book Review - Europe: Early Modern and Modern". American Historical Review. 104. June 1999. Archived from the original on 6 December 2009.
- Milton, Anthony (1 March 2001). "Sermons at Court. Politics and Religion in Elizabethan and Jacobean Preaching/Government by Polemic. James I, the King's Preachers, and the Rhetorics of Conformity, 1603-1625". Anglican and Episcopal History. 70 (1). Archived from the original on 29 August 2020 – via Questia.
