= William Bethome =

William Bethome, STP was an Oxford college head in the 15th-century.

Bethome was educated at Eton College. He was Rector of Lincoln College, Oxford, from 1488 to 1493.
