= John Beke (academic administrator) =

John Beke, STB was an Oxford college head in the 15th-century.

Beke was appointed Rector of Lincoln College, Oxford on 7 May 1434 by the Visitor (then William Grey). He later served as Rector at Oddington, Oxfordshire in 1443-1444.

Academic offices
| Preceded by William Chamberleyn | Rector of Lincoln College, Oxford; 1434–1461 | Succeeded by John Tristropp |
