= John Horner (Rector of Lincoln College, Oxford) =

John Horner, DD (b & d Oxford 13 March 1747 – 20 February 1792) was an Oxford college head.

He graduated BA from Merton College, Oxford, in 1689. He was rector of Lincoln College, Oxford, from 1784 until his death. He was also priest in ordinary at the Chapel Royal.
