= John Radford (Rector of Lincoln College, Oxford) =

John Radford, DD (b Attercliffe 26 May 1782; d Oxford 21 October 1851) was an Oxford college head in the 19th century.

He was born in Sheffield and graduated BA from Lincoln College, Oxford, in 1804, MA in 1807 and BD in 1815. He was a Fellow of Lincoln from 1805 and also held the living at Twyford, Buckinghamshire. Radford was Rector of Lincoln College, Oxford, from 1834 until his death. His Times obituary stated

"He was much beloved by all classes for his affable and kind demeanour."
