= John Man =

English clergyman, college head, and diplomat (1512–1569)

John Man (1512–1569) was an English clergyman, college head, and diplomat.

== Life ==
He was born at Lacock or Winterbourne Stoke, in Wiltshire. He was educated at Winchester College from 1523, and New College, Oxford, where he graduated B.A. in 1533, and M.A. in 1537, and became a Fellow. Under suspicion of heresy, he was expelled; but became the principal of White Hall, Oxford in 1547.

In 1562 he was appointed Warden of Merton College, Oxford, by the influence of Archbishop Matthew Parker. He became Dean of Gloucester in 1566. In 1567 he was sent by Elizabeth I as her ambassador to Madrid; the mission was unsuccessful and he was recalled in 1568. Dr. John Man was a Protestant cleric, who called the pope in public a canting little monk. Some sources maintain he was expelled by Philip II.

== Works ==
He published Common places of Christian Religion (1563), based on Wolfgang Musculus.

Diplomatic posts
Preceded by	English Ambassador to Spain; 1567–1568	Succeeded by John Digby, 1st Earl of Bristol
