= John Cottisford =

English churchman and academic

John Cottisford (died c.1540) was an English churchman and academic, Rector of Lincoln College, Oxford, from 1518.

== Life ==
He was educated at Lincoln College, taking the degrees of B.A. in 1505, M.A. in 1510, and D.D. in 1525 (3 July). He served as proctor for 1515, and, on the resignation of Thomas Drax, was elected rector of his college (2 March 1518). This position he held for nearly twenty years. He was also commissary or Vice-Chancellor of Oxford University. He received this appointment from Archbishop William Warham, the chancellor, on the death of Thomas Musgrave in the autumn of 1527, and took the oaths on 7 December. On Warham's death in August 1532 he resigned, and was succeeded by William Tresham, the nominee of John Longland, bishop of Lincoln, the newly elected Chancellor. As commissary, Cottisford was engaged in the attempt to stop the introduction of heretical Protestant books into Oxford, and in the arrest of Thomas Garret, parson of Honey Lane, London, who was active in the distribution of such literature, and was subsequently burnt at Smithfield in company with Robert Barnes and William Jerome. An account of the whole affair, and the dismay of Cottisford on hearing of Garret's escape from prison, is in John Foxe's Acts and Monuments.

In 1532, Henry VIII nominated him as one of the canons of the new college, to become Christ Church, Oxford, which he erected on the foundation laid by Cardinal Wolsey, but he continued to hold his rectorship of Lincoln College, in which capacity he signed an acknowledgment of the royal supremacy on 30 July 1534. His connection with Lincoln College was terminated by his resignation on 7 January 1538, and shortly after he was collated to the prebend of All Saints in Hungate, Lincoln. His successor was collated in October 1542.

== Sources ==
- This article incorporates text from a publication now in the public domain: "Cottisford, John". Dictionary of National Biography. London: Smith, Elder & Co. 1885–1900.

Academic offices
Preceded by Thomas Drax	Rector of Lincoln College, Oxford; 1518–1539	Succeeded by Hugh Weston
Preceded by Martin Lyndsey	Vice-Chancellor of the University of Oxford; 1527–1531	Succeeded by Henry White
Preceded by Henry White	Vice-Chancellor of the University of Oxford; 1532–1532	Succeeded by William Tresham
