= Simon Grene =

English vice-chancellor

Simon Grene (alias Fotherby) was an English 16th-century Vice-Chancellor of the University of Oxford.

Grene was a Doctor of Divinity and a Fellow of Lincoln College, Oxford. He was twice appointed Vice-Chancellor of Oxford University in 1503 and 1505.

== Bibliography ==
- Hibbert, Christopher, ed. (1988). The Encyclopaedia of Oxford. Macmillan. ISBN 0-333-39917-X.

Preceded by William Atwater, Thomas Banke, Hugh Saunders	Vice-Chancellor of the University of Oxford; 1503–1504	Succeeded by John Kynton, Robert Tehy
Preceded by John Kynton, Robert Tehy	Vice-Chancellor of the University of Oxford; 1505–1506	Succeeded by John Thornden, William Fauntleroy
