= John Thornden =

English vice-chancellor and suffragan bishop

John Thornden (or Thornton) was an English 16th-century Vice-Chancellor of the University of Oxford, and became a suffragan bishop.

Thornden was a Doctor of Divinity. Thornden was appointed Vice-Chancellor of Oxford University several times from 1503 onwards. He was also a suffragan bishop to the Archbishop of Canterbury, William Warham.

== Bibliography ==
- Hibbert, Christopher, ed. (1988). The Encyclopaedia of Oxford. Macmillan. ISBN 0-333-39917-X.

Preceded by William Atwater, Thomas Banke, Hugh Saunders	Vice-Chancellor of the University of Oxford; 1503–1504	Succeeded by John Kynton, Robert Tehy
Preceded by John Kynton, Robert Tehy	Vice-Chancellor of the University of Oxford; 1505–1509	Succeeded by William Fauntleroy
Preceded by William Fauntleroy	Vice-Chancellor of the University of Oxford; 1510–1511	Succeeded by William Fauntleroy, Thomas Drax, John Roper, John Cockys, Edmund Wylsford
Preceded by Edmund Wylsford, William Fauntleroy, John Kynton	Vice-Chancellor of the University of Oxford; 1513–1515	Succeeded by Edmund Wylsford
