= David Hays (academic) =

English friar and vice-chancellor

David Hays (aka Huys) was an English 15th–16th-century Vice-Chancellor of the University of Oxford.

Hayes was a Doctor of Divinity and a Dominican Catholic Friar. He was appointed Vice-Chancellor of Oxford University during 1499–1500, together with William Atwater and Thomas Chaundeler.

== Bibliography ==
- Hibbert, Christopher, ed. (1988). The Encyclopaedia of Oxford. Macmillan. ISBN 0-333-39917-X.

Preceded by Thomas Harpur	Vice-Chancellor of the University of Oxford; 1499–1500	Succeeded by William Atwater
