= William Grey (bishop of Ely) =

15th-century Bishop of Ely and Treasurer of England

- Bishop of Ely
- Appointed: 21 June 1454
- Term ended: 4 August 1478
- Predecessor: Thomas Bourchier
- Successor: John Morton
- Previous post: Archdeacon of Richmond

Orders
- Consecration: 8 September 1454 by Thomas Bourchier

Personal details
- Died: 4 August 1478
- Denomination: Catholic

William Grey

Lord High Treasurer
- In office 25 October 1469 – 10 July 1470
- Preceded by: John Langstrother
- Succeeded by: John Tiptoft

William Grey (died 1478) was a medieval English churchman, academic, and Lord High Treasurer. He served as Chancellor of Oxford University and as Bishop of Ely.

== Family ==
Grey was the son of Sir Thomas Grey, one of the conspirators in the Southampton Plot, and Alice Neville, the daughter of Ralph Neville, 1st Earl of Westmorland, by his first wife Margaret (d.1396), daughter of Hugh Stafford, 2nd Earl of Stafford.

He had three brothers, and four or five sisters, including:

- Sir Thomas Grey (1404 – d. before 1426), who in 1412, at eight years of age, was betrothed to Isabel, then three years of age, only daughter of Richard of Conisburgh, 3rd Earl of Cambridge, and Anne Mortimer, but died childless.
- Sir Ralph Grey (d. 17 March 1442), who married Elizabeth FitzHugh, daughter of Henry FitzHugh, 3rd Baron FitzHugh, and Elizabeth Grey, and left children.
- Sir John Grey.
- a sister who married a husband surnamed Arundel.
- Joan Grey (c. 1408–1488), who married Sir John Salvin.
- Elizabeth Grey (c. 1402–1454), who married firstly, Sir William Whitchester, and secondly, Sir Roger Widdrington.

== Studies in England ==
Grey was educated at Balliol College, Oxford, and in due course became a Doctor of Divinity at Oxford University. His powerful family connections early secured him ecclesiastical preferment. On 11 January 1430–1 he was collated to the prebend of Kentish Town in the Diocese of London, an office which he held until 1446. On 16 May 1434 he was made archdeacon of Northampton, and in the same year prebendary of Thame in the Diocese of London; these preferments he occupied until 1454. On 21 October 1443, he was collated to the prebend of Longdon in the Diocese of Lichfield. Towards the end of 1447 he is mentioned as prebendary of Barnby, and then for a short time in the latter part of 1452 of Driffield, both in the Diocese of York. Before this last date, on 3 March 1449–50, he was admitted archdeacon of Richmond.

How far these various and accumulated preferments imply a residence in England may be doubtful, but that Grey lived for some time in Oxford, possibly with the object of completing the acts required for the degree of Doctor of Divinity, is shown by the facts that he was elected Chancellor of the University, and held that office in 1440-1 and also during a part of 1442, and that later in this year he acted for a time as commissary. Probably his long sojourn abroad may be placed partly before 1440 and mostly after 1442.

== Studies abroad ==
Grey's travels led him first to Cologne, where he studied logic, philosophy, and theology. He lived there in princely style and with a magnificent household, for some years. Then, possibly after an interval spent in England, he went to Italy in order to apply himself more closely to the study of classical learning. He stayed for a while in Florence and then removed to Padua. Afterwards, being advised to profit by the teaching of the famous Guarino da Verona, he settled in Ferrara. Here, too, he kept a splendid establishment, and maintained Niccolò Perotti, afterwards well known as a grammarian, in his household, probably about 1477–8. Perotti was a mere youth, but his Greek scholarship made his help valuable to the Englishman. Grey remained at Ferrara until 1449, when Henry VI appointed him his proctor at the Roman curia. He took Perotti with him and afterwards procured him a post in the household of Cardinal Bessarion.

== Bishop of Ely ==
Grey's devotion to humanism and his patronage of learned men naturally found favour in the eyes of Pope Nicholas V. As early as 1450 the latter sought to obtain for him the bishopric of Lincoln, and failing to accomplish this, on 21 June 1454, on the elevation of Bishop Bourchier to the see of Canterbury, nominated him to the vacant bishopric of Ely. In the bull of provision Grey is described as apostolic notary and referendary. The temporalities were restored to him on 6 September, and he was consecrated by the new archbishop at Mortlake two days later. But he was not installed in his cathedral until St Cuthbert's Day, 20 March 1457–8, when there was a great frost.

== Contributions to Balliol College Library ==
Grey devoted much care to the collection of manuscripts, and wherever he resided constantly employed scribes to make copies of such books as he could not otherwise obtain. Many of these he had adorned with costly miniatures and initial letters by the skill of an artist who worked for him at Florence. It was his desire to make his collection the nucleus of a library for Balliol College, Oxford, to the building of which, as well as to that of the master's lodgings and of the old buttery and hall, he contributed largely. The work was finished about 1477 by Robert Abdy, then master of the college, and enriched with some two hundred manuscripts, the bishop's gift. Of these, many were destroyed in the reign of Edward VI and during the English Civil War, and by Wood's time few of the miniatures in the remaining volumes had escaped mutilation. But by 1890, no less than 152 of Grey's codices were still in the possession of the college, and form a large part of Roger Mynors' 1963 catalogue of the college's manuscripts. The bishop's coat of arms (gules, a lion rampant, within a bordure engrailed argent) is displayed on two windows of the Old Library, and in the panels below the window of the Master's dining room.

== Mediator during the Wars of the Roses ==
During the troubled years of his episcopate Grey never took a leading part in public affairs. He devoted himself rather to the charge of his diocese, and still more probably to his learned interests, which were reputed to extend not only to Greek but also to Hebrew, while in his palace on Holborn he maintained the same stately establishment as that for which he had been famous on the continent. Yet there is ample evidence also of his political activity.

In the beginning of 1455, he was appointed to serve on a commission to arbitrate between the Duke of York and the Duke of Somerset, the failure of which was shown in the first battle of St. Albans in the following May. Later on, apparently in 1460, before the battle of Northampton, he again took part in an attempted reconciliation of the Yorkist leaders. At length, on 25 October 1469, he was made Lord High Treasurer, and held the seals until the following July. Grey's tenure as Lord High Treasurer occurred during the Great Bullion Famine and the Great Slump in England. On 26 August 1471 he was named first on a commission of fifteen to hold a diet at Alnwick to deal with the infractions of the truce with Scotland, and in the following March to treat with the Scots ambassadors at Newcastle-upon-Tyne on 25 April, and again on 16 May he was entrusted with a similar negotiation.

In February 1477–8, Grey's health showed signs of breaking down. After Easter, he quit his London palace for Ely, and then, as his weakness increased, he removed to his neighbouring manor of Downham. Here he died on Tuesday, 4 August 1478. On the next day his body was borne to Ely with great pomp, attended by almost all the priests of the Isle, and on that Thursday the bishop was buried between two marble pillars on the north side of Ely Cathedral, the fabric of which owes not a little to his munificence.

== Footnotes ==
Academic offices
| Preceded by Richard Roderham | Chancellor of the University of Oxford; 1440–1442 | Succeeded by Thomas Gascoigne |
| Preceded by John Gorsuch, Robert Thwaytes, William Babington | Vice-Chancellor of the University of Oxford; 1442–1443 | Succeeded by William Dowson, William Westkarre |
Political offices
| Preceded by John Langstrother | Lord High Treasurer; 1469–1470 | Succeeded by John Tiptoft, 1st Earl of Worcester |
Catholic Church titles
| Preceded by Thomas Bourchier | Bishop of Ely; 1454–1478 | Succeeded by John Morton |
