= Thomas Banke =

English vice-chancellor

Thomas Banke was an English 16th-century Vice-Chancellor of the University of Oxford.

Banke was a Doctor of Divinity and a Rector of Lincoln College, Oxford. He was appointed Vice-Chancellor of Oxford University during 1501–03.

== Bibliography ==
- Hibbert, Christopher, ed. (1988). The Encyclopaedia of Oxford. Macmillan. ISBN 0-333-39917-X.

Preceded by William Atwater	Vice-Chancellor of the University of Oxford; 1501–1503	Succeeded by John Thornden, John Kynton, Simon Grene
