= Richard Barnack =

English vicar and vice-chancellor

Richard Barnack was an English 16th-century vicar and vice-chancellor at the University of Oxford.

He was a doctor of divinity at New College, Oxford. In 1519, he was appointed Vice-Chancellor of Oxford University, continuing until 1520, and was vicar of Adderbury in northern Oxfordshire.

== Bibliography ==
- Hibbert, Christopher, ed. (1988). The Encyclopaedia of Oxford. Macmillan. ISBN 0-333-39917-X.

Academic offices
Preceded by Richard Duck	Vice-Chancellor of the University of Oxford; 1519–1520	Succeeded by William Broke
