= Robert Smith (Oxford) =

English vice-chancellor

Dr Robert Smith (aka Smyth) was an English 15th-century Vice-Chancellor of the University of Oxford.

Hayes was a Doctor of Divinity at Lincoln College, Oxford and a Principal of Hampton Hall, in Turl Street near Lincoln College. He was appointed Vice-Chancellor of Oxford University during 1493–1497.

== Bibliography ==
- Hibbert, Christopher, ed. (1988). The Encyclopaedia of Oxford. Macmillan. ISBN 0-333-39917-X.

Preceded by John Coldale	Vice-Chancellor of the University of Oxford; 1493–1497	Succeeded by William Atwater
