= Thomas Harpur (academic) =

English vice-chancellor

Thomas Harpur (died 1508) was an English Vice-Chancellor of the University of Oxford.

Harpur was a Doctor of Divinity. He was a Fellow and then Warden of Merton College, Oxford, during 1507–8. In 1498, he was appointed Vice-Chancellor of Oxford University. He is also vicar of St Nicholas, Bristol, and died there in 1508. A double-brass with an inscription was installed to his and Ralph Hamsterley's memory in Merton College Chapel. Ralph Hamsterley was a Fellow of Merton College and later Master of University College, Oxford.

== Bibliography ==
- Hibbert, Christopher, ed. (1988). The Encyclopaedia of Oxford. Macmillan. ISBN 0-333-39917-X.

Academic offices
Preceded by William Atwater	Vice-Chancellor of the University of Oxford; 1498–1499	Succeeded by David Hays, William Atwater, Thomas Chaundeler
Preceded by Richard FitzJames	Wardens of Merton College, Oxford; 1507–1508	Succeeded by Richard Rawlins
