= Dooke =

Dooke is a surname, and may refer to:

- Richard Dooke, English 16th-century Vice-Chancellor of Oxford University

== See also ==
- Doke
