= Edmund Wylsford =

English academic administrator

Edmund Wylsford (died 1516) was an English 16th-century Provost of Oriel College, Oxford and a vice-chancellor of the University of Oxford.

Wylsford was a Doctor of Divinity. He was Provost of Oriel College between 30 October 1507 and his death on 3 October 1516. During this period, he was appointed Vice-Chancellor of Oxford University as part of a committee multiple times in 1511, 1512, 1514, and 1515.

== See also ==
- List of provosts of Oriel College, Oxford

== Bibliography ==
- Hibbert, Christopher, ed. (1988). The Encyclopaedia of Oxford. Macmillan. ISBN 0-333-39917-X.

Preceded by Thomas Cornysh	Provost of Oriel College, Oxford; 1507–1516	Succeeded by James More
Preceded by John Thornden, John Mychell	Vice-Chancellor of the University of Oxford; 1511–1513	Succeeded by William Fauntleroy, John Kynton, John Thornden
Preceded by William Fauntleroy, John Kynton, John Thornden	Vice-Chancellor of the University of Oxford; 1514–1516	Succeeded by Lawrence Stubbs
