= William Fauntleroy =

English university vice-chancellor

William Fauntleroy was an English 16th-century Fellow of New College, Oxford and a vice-chancellor of the University of Oxford.

Fauntleroy was born in Sherborne, Dorset. He was the son of John Fauntleroy and the brother of Elizabeth Fauntleroy, Abbess of Amesbury. He gained a Doctor of Divinity in 1506 at New College in Oxford. He was appointed Vice-Chancellor of Oxford University as part of a committee multiple times annually during 1506 to 1513. He was probably Rector of Lydlinch in Dorset during 1527–1537.

== Bibliography ==
- Hibbert, Christopher, ed. (1988). The Encyclopaedia of Oxford. Macmillan. ISBN 0-333-39917-X.

Preceded by Simon Grene, John Roper, John Adams	Vice-Chancellor of the University of Oxford; 1506–1507	Succeeded by John Thornden, John Avery, John Kynton
Preceded by John Thornden, John Avery, John Kynton	Vice-Chancellor of the University of Oxford; 1508–1510	Succeeded by John Thornden, John Mychell
Preceded by John Thornden, John Mychell	Vice-Chancellor of the University of Oxford; 1511–1514	Succeeded by John Thornden, Lawrence Stubbs, Edmund Wylsford, Hugh Whytehead
