= List of vice-chancellors of the University of Oxford =

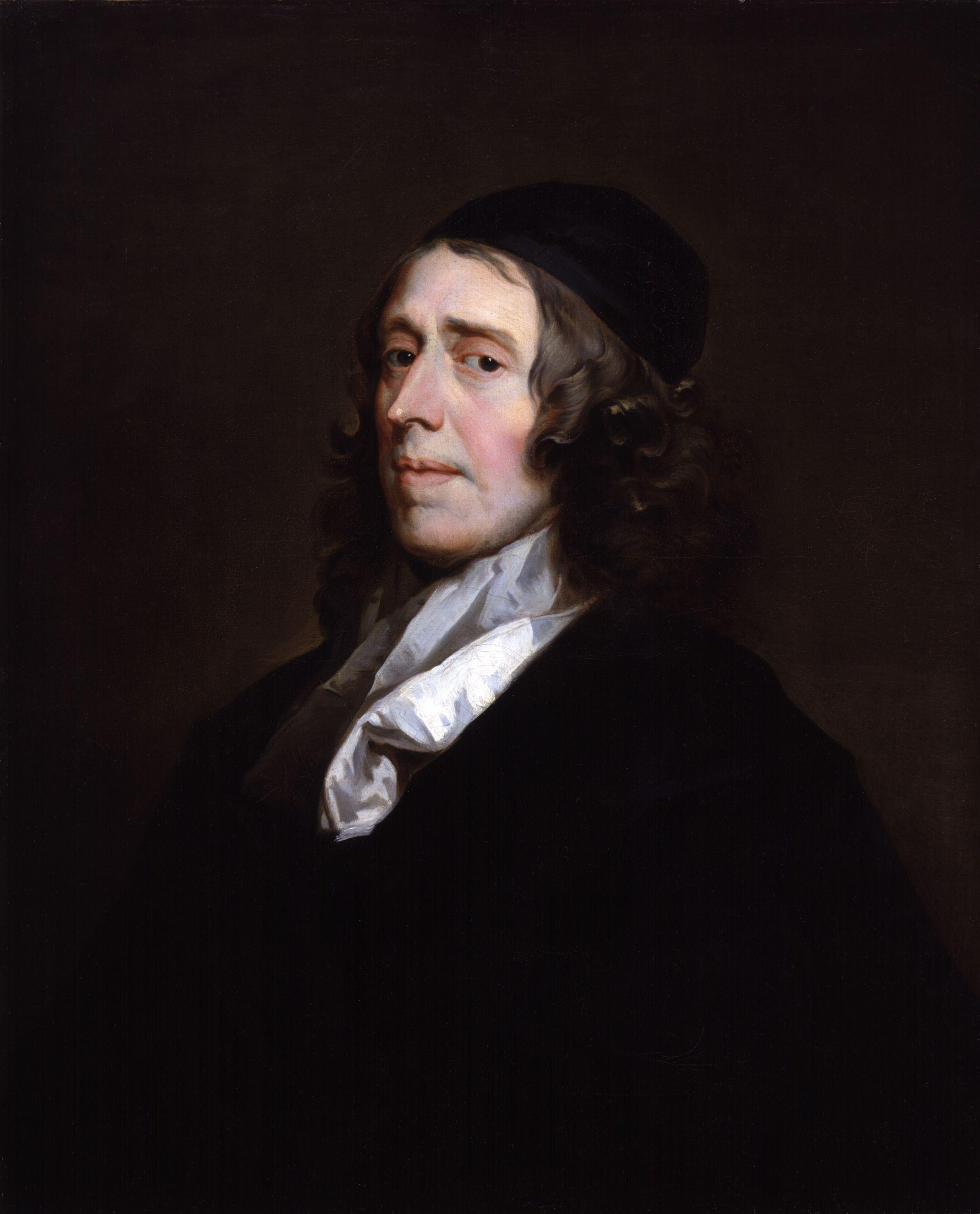
John Owen, appointed Vice-Chancellor by Oliver Cromwell in 1652

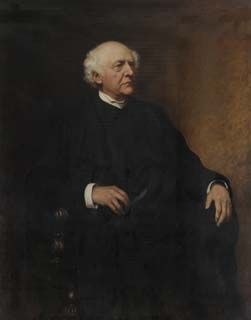
Henry Liddell, appointed Vice-Chancellor in 1870.

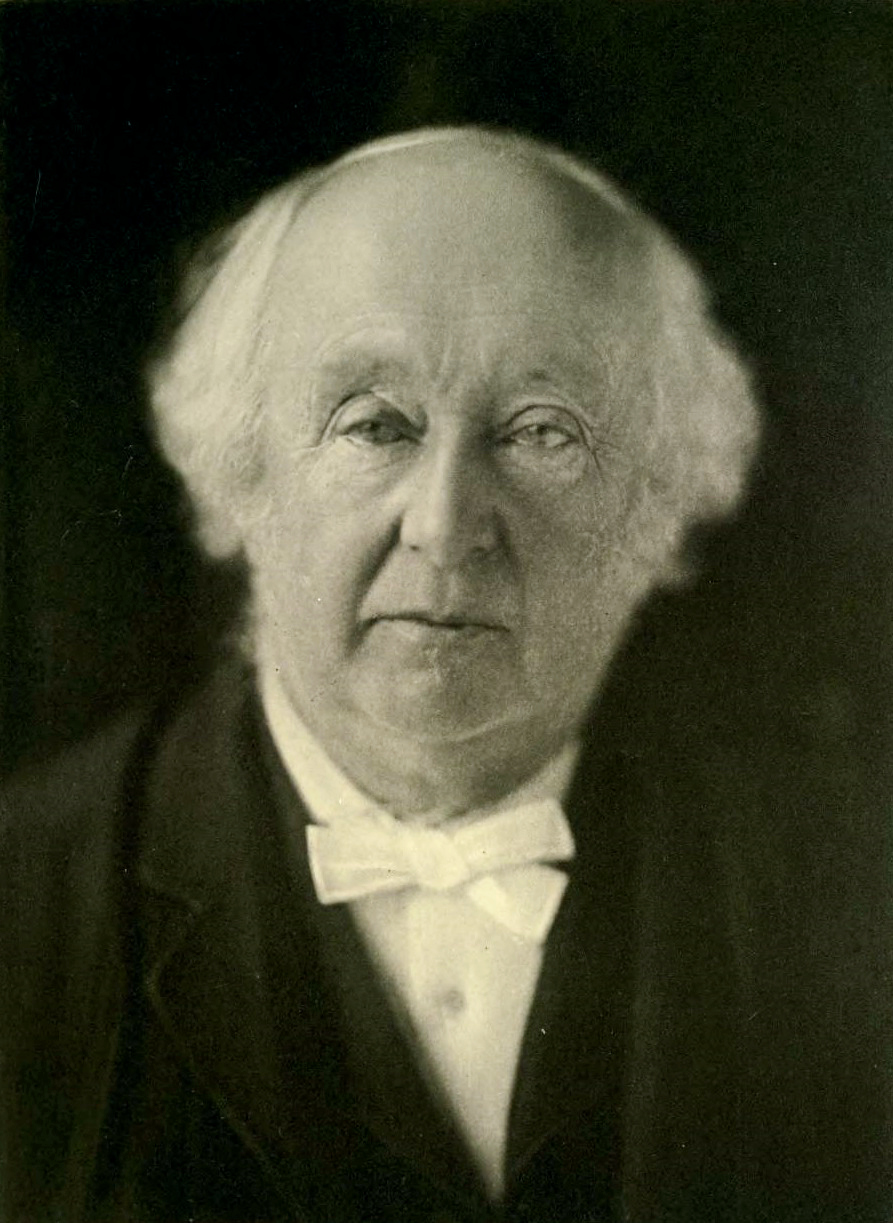
Benjamin Jowett, appointed Vice-Chancellor in 1882.

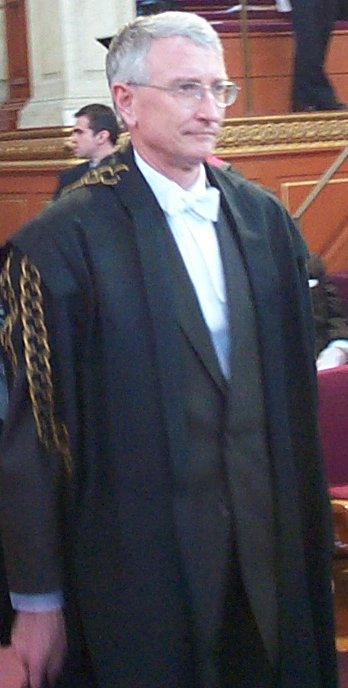
John Hood, appointed Vice-Chancellor in 2004.

The vice-chancellor of the University of Oxford is the chief executive and leader of the University of Oxford. The following people have been vice-chancellors of the University of Oxford, formally known as the Right Worshipful the vice-chancellor.

== Chronological list ==
- 1230 – Elyas de Daneis
- 1270 – Robert Steeton
- 1288 – John Heigham
- 1304 – John de Oseworhd
- 1311 – Walter Gifford
- 1325 – Richard Kamshale
- 1333 – Richard FitzRalph
- 1336 – John de Ayllesbury
- 1337 – John de Reigham
- 1347 – Hugh de Willoughby
- 1348 – William de Hawkesworth
- 1367 – John de Codeford
- 1368 – John de Codeford
- 1377 – Robert Aylesham
- 1382 – Fr Peter Stokes
- 1386 – Henry Nafford or Yafford
- 1389 – John Lyndon
- 1391 – John Ashwardby
- 1394 – Richard Ullerston
- 1396 – Nicholas Faux
- 1397 – William Farendon or Faringdon
- 1399 – John Snappe and others
- 1401 – William Farendon
- 1404 – Griffin Kirkadam
- 1405 – William Farendon
- 1406 – John Whytehede
- 1407 – John Orum
- 1422 – John Daventry
- 1426 – Richard Roderham
- 1430 – Thomas Eglesfield
- 1431 – Richard Roderham
- 1433 – John Burbach or Hurbach
- 1434 – Thomas Gascoigne, Christopher Knolles, John Burbach
- 1435 – John Burbach, Thomas Bonyngworth
- 1436 – John Burbach, Thomas Greneley
- 1437 – John Gorsuch, Thomas Greneley
- 1438 – John Gorsuch, William Hawtrine
- 1439 – John Gorsuch, John Burbach, Thomas Southam, Thomas Gascoigne
- 1440 – John Gorsuch
- 1441 – John Gorsuch, Robert Thwaytes, William Babington
- 1442 – William Grey, William Babington, John Gorsuch, William Westkarre
- 1443 – William Dowson, William Westkarre
- 1444 – William Dowson, Richard Hall, William Westkarre
- 1445 – William Dowson, John Selot
- 1446 – William Westkarre, John Moreton, William Dowson
- 1447 – John Burneby, William Dowson
- 1448 – John Burneby
- 1449 – John Willey, John Burneby, William Dowson
- 1450 – Richard Ringstede, John Beke, Roger Bulkeley, John Van
- 1451 – John Beke, John Van
- 1452 – John Beke, Thomas Tweyn or Yweyn alias Chalke, Thomas Saunders
- 1453 – Luke Lacock, Robert Thwayts, Thomas Saunders
- 1454 – Thomas Tweyn, Thomas Saunders
- 1455 – Thomas Twynge alias Bonifaunt
- 1456 – Thomas Saunders
- 1457 – Thomas Chippenham
- 1458 – Walter Wynhale, Thomas Twynge
- 1459 – John Danvers, Thomas Jaune or Jane
- 1460 – Thomas Tweyn
- 1461 – William Ive, Roger Bulkeley
- 1462 – William Ive
- 1463 – John Watts, Thomas Chaundler, David Husband, John Mulcaster
- 1464 – Laurence Cokkys, Thomas Chaundler, Roger Bulkeley, John Caldbeck, Thomas Person
- 1465 – Thomas Smith, Robert Ixworth, John Caldbeck, Thomas Chaundler
- 1466 – Thomas Chaundler, John Caldbeck, Thomas Stevyn, Laurence Cokkys, Thomas Hill
- 1467 – Thomas Chaundler, Thomas Stevyn, Thomas Walton
- 1468 – Thomas Stevyn, Thomas Jaune
- 1469 – Robert Tulley, Thomas Jaune
- 1470 – Thomas Stevyn
- 1480 – John Lane, William Sutton
- 1481 – Richard Fitzjames, William Sutton
- 1482 – Robert Wrangwais, William Sutton
- 1484 – Richard Mayew, Thomas Pawnton
- 1485 – Richard Mayew
- 1486 – John Taylor
- 1487 – Richard Estmond
- 1488 – John Coldale
- 1489 – John Coldale
- 1490 – John Coldale
- 1491 – Richard Fitzjames, John Coldale
- 1492 – John Coldale
- 1493 – Robert Smith
- 1497 – William Atwater
- 1498 – Thomas Harpur
- 1499 – David Hays, William Atwater, Thomas Chaundeler
- 1500 – William Atwater
- 1501 – Thomas Banke, Hugh Saunders alias Shakspeere
- 1502 – William Atwater, Thomas Banke, Hugh Saunders
- 1503 – John Thornden or Thornton, John Kynton, Simon Grene alias Fotherby
- 1504 – John Kynton, Robert Tehy or Thay
- 1505 – Simon Grene, John Roper, John Adams
- 1506 – John Thornden, William Fauntleroy
- 1507 – John Thornden or Thornton, John Avery, John Kynton
- 1508 – William Fauntleroy, John Thornden
- 1509 – William Fauntleroy
- 1510 – John Thornden, John Mychell
- 1511 – William Fauntleroy, Thomas Drax, John Roper, John Cockys, Edmund Wylsford
- 1512 – Edmund Wylsford, William Fauntleroy, John Kynton
- 1513 – William Fauntleroy, John Kynton, John Thornden
- 1514 – John Thornden, Lawrence Stubbs, Edmund Wylsford, Hugh Whytehead
- 1515 – Edmund Wylsford
- 1516 – Lawrence Stubbs
- 1517 – Richard Duck or Doke
- 1518 – Richard Duck or Doke
- 1519 – Richard Barnack, Richard Duck or Doke
- 1520 – William Broke or Brook, Richard Benger
- 1521 – Richard Benger
- 1522 – Richard Benger
- 1523 – Thomas Musgrave
- 1527 – Martin Lyndsey, John Cottisford
- 1528 – John Cottisford
- 1531 – Henry White
- 1532 – John Cottisford, William Tresham
- 1547 – Walter Wright
- 1550 – William Tresham
- 1551 – Owen Oglethorpe
- 1552 – James Brookes or Brooks, Richard Marshall
- 1553 – Richard Marshall
- 1554 – John Warner
- 1555 – Richard Smyth
- 1556 – William Tresham, Thomas Raynolds
- 1557 – Thomas Raynolds, Thomas Whyte
- 1558 – William Tresham
- 1559 – John Warner
- 1560 – Francis Babbington
- 1561 – Francis Babbington
- 1562 – Thomas Whyte
- 1564 – John Kennall
- 1567 – Thomas Cowper
- 1570 – Thomas Cowper
- 1571 – Lawrence Humphrey
- 1576 – Herbert Westfaling
- 1577 – William Cole
- 1578 – Martin Culpepper
- 1579 – Tobias Matthew
- 1580 – Arthur Yeldard
- 1581 – William James
- 1582 – Robert Hovenden
- 1583 – Thomas Thornton
- 1584 – John Underhill
- 1585 – Edmund Lilly
- 1586 – Daniel Bernard
- 1587 – Francis Wyllis
- 1588 – Martin Heton
- 1589 – Nicholas Bond
- 1590 – William James
- 1592 – Nicholas Bond
- 1593 – Edmund Lilly
- 1596 – Thomas Ravys
- 1598 – Thomas Singleton
- 1599 – Thomas Thornton
- 1600 – George Abbot
- 1601 – George Ryves
- 1602 – John Howson
- 1603 – George Abbot
- 1604 – John Williams
- 1605 – George Abbot
- 1606 – Henry Airay
- 1607 – John King
- 1611 – Thomas Singleton
- 1614 – William Goodwyn
- 1616 – Arthur Lake
- 1617 – William Goodwyn
- 1619 – John Prideaux
- 1621 – William Piers
- 1624 – John Prideaux
- 1626 – William Juxon
- 1628 – Accepted Frewen
- 1630 – William Smyth
- 1632 – Brian Duppa
- 1634 – Robert Pincke
- 1636 – Richard Baylie
- 1638 – Accepted Frewen
- 1640 – Christopher Potter
- 1641 – John Prideaux
- 1642 – John Prideaux in absentia (duties performed by Robert Pincke and then John Tolson as Pro-Vice-Chancellors)
- 1643 – John Tolson, Robert Pincke
- 1645 – Samuel Fell
- 1648 – Edward Reynolds
- 1650 – Daniel Greenwood
- 1652 – John Owen
- 1657 – John Conant
- 1660 – Paul Hood
- 1661 – Richard Baylie
- 1662 – Walter Blandford
- 1664 – Robert Say
- 1666 – John Fell
- 1669 – Peter Mews
- 1673 – Ralph Bathurst
- 1676 – Henry Clerk
- 1677 – John Nicholas
- 1679 – Timothy Halton
- 1682 – John Lloyd
- 1685 – Timothy Halton
- 1686 – John Venn
- 1687 – Gilbert Ironside
- 1689 – Jonathan Edwards
- 1692 – Henry Aldrich
- 1695 – Fitzherbert Adams
- 1697 – John Meare
- 1698 – William Paynter
- 1700 – Roger Mander
- 1702 – William Delaune
- 1706 – William Lancaster
- 1710 – Thomas Brathwait
- 1712 – Bernard Gardiner
- 1715 – John Baron
- 1718 – Robert Shippen
- 1723 – John Mather
- 1728 – Edward Butler
- 1732 – William Holmes
- 1735 – Stephen Niblett
- 1738 – Theophilus Leigh
- 1741 – Walter Hodges
- 1744 – Euseby Isham
- 1747 – John Purnell
- 1750 – John Browne
- 1753 – George Huddesford
- 1756 – Thomas Randolph
- 1759 – Joseph Browne
- 1765 – David Durell
- 1768 – Nathan Wetherell
- 1772 – Thomas Fothergill
- 1776 – George Horne
- 1780 – Samuel Dennis
- 1784 – Joseph Chapman
- 1788 – John Cooke
- 1792 – John Wills
- 1796 – Scrope Berdmore
- 1797 – Edmund Isham
- 1798 – Michael Marlow
- 1802 – Whittington Landon
- 1806 – Henry Richards
- 1807 – John Parsons
- 1810 – John Cole
- 1814 – Thomas Lee
- 1818 – Frodsham Hodson
- 1820 – George William Hall
- 1824 – Richard Jenkyns
- 1828 – John Collier Jones
- 1832 – George Rowley
- 1836 – Ashhurst Turner Gilbert
- 1840 – Philip Wynter
- 1844 – Benjamin Parsons Symons
- 1848 – Frederick Charles Plumptre
- 1852 – Richard Lynch Cotton
- 1856 – David Williams
- 1858 – Francis Jeune
- 1862 – John Prideaux Lightfoot
- 1866 – Francis Leighton
- 1870 – Henry George Liddell
- 1874 – James Edwards Sewell
- 1878 – Evan Evans
- 1882 – Benjamin Jowett
- 1886 – James Bellamy
- 1890 – Henry Boyd
- 1894 – John Richard Magrath
- 1898 – Sir William Reynell Anson
- 1899 – Thomas Fowler
- 1901 – David Binning Monro
- 1904 – William Walter Merry
- 1906 – Thomas Herbert Warren
- 1910 – Charles Buller Heberden
- 1913 – Thomas Banks Strong
- 1917 – Herbert Edward Douglas Blakiston
- 1920 – Lewis Richard Farnell
- 1923 – Joseph Wells
- 1926 – Francis William Pember
- 1929 – Frederick Homes Dudden
- 1932 – Francis John Lys
- 1935 – Alexander Dunlop Lindsay
- 1938 – George Stuart Gordon
- 1941 – Sir William David Ross
- 1944 – Sir Richard Winn Livingstone
- 1947 – William Teulon Swan Stallybrass
- 1948 – Reverend John Lowe
- 1951 – Sir Cecil Maurice Bowra
- 1954 – Alic Halford Smith
- 1957 – John Cecil Masterman
- 1958 – Thomas Sherrer Ross Boase
- 1960 – Arthur Lionel Pugh Norrington
- 1962 – Walter Fraser Oakeshott
- 1964 – Kenneth Clinton Wheare
- 1966 – John Norman Davidson Kelly
- 1966 – Kenneth Turpin
- 1969 – Alan Bullock, Lord Bullock of Leafield
- 1973 – Sir John Habakkuk
- 1977 – Sir Rex Richards
- 1981 – Sir Geoffrey Warnock
- 1985 – Lord Neill of Bladen
- 1989 – Sir Richard Southwood
- 1993 – Sir Peter North
- 1997 – Sir Colin Lucas
- 2004 – Sir John Hood
- 2009 – Andrew D. Hamilton
- 2016 – Dame Louise Richardson
- 2023 – Irene Tracey

== See also ==
- List of chancellors of the University of Oxford
- List of University of Oxford people
- List of vice-chancellors of the University of Cambridge
