= Cowdale =

Cowdale may refer to:

- Cowdale, hamlet within King Sterndale
- John Cowdale, MP for Carlisle
