= Richard Roderham =

Richard Roderham was a medieval churchman and university Vice-Chancellor and Chancellor.

Roderham attended Balliol College, Oxford. He was Chancellor of the Church of Hereford. He became Vice-Chancellor of the University of Oxford twice during 1426–1430 and 1431–1433. In 1433, he became the Rector of Grey Friars, Oxford. He acted as the Chancellor of Oxford University for the period 1440–1.

== Bibliography ==
- Hibbert, Christopher, ed. (1988). The Encyclopædia of Oxford. Macmillan. ISBN 0-333-39917-X.

Academic offices
Preceded by John Daventry	Vice-Chancellor of the University of Oxford; 1426–1430	Succeeded by Thomas Eglesfield
Preceded by Thomas Eglesfield	Vice-Chancellor of the University of Oxford; 1431–1433	Succeeded by John Burbach
Preceded by John Norton	Chancellor of the University of Oxford; 1440–1442	Succeeded by William Grey
