= Martin Lyndsey =

English university vice-chancellor

Martin Lyndsey DD (or Lindsey) was an English 16th-century university vice-chancellor.

Lyndsey was a Doctor of Divinity and a Fellow of Lincoln College, Oxford. In 1527, Lyndsey was appointed Vice-Chancellor of the University of Oxford.

== Bibliography ==
- Hibbert, Christopher, ed. (1988). The Encyclopaedia of Oxford. Macmillan. ISBN 0-333-39917-X.

Academic offices
Preceded by Thomas Musgrave	Vice-Chancellor of the University of Oxford; 1527–1528	Succeeded by John Cottisford
