= William Atwater (bishop) =

English churchman

William Atwater (1440–1521) was an English churchman, who became Bishop of Lincoln in 1514.

He was a Fellow of Magdalen College, Oxford, from 1480. He served as Vice-Chancellor of Oxford University, in the period from 1497 to 1503.

Atwater became vicar of Cumnor in 1495. He became Dean of the Chapel Royal, in 1502. In 1504, he was appointed Canon of the eleventh stall at St George's Chapel, Windsor Castle, a position he held until 1514. He was chancellor of Lincoln from 1506 to 1512.

== Bibliography ==
- Concise Dictionary of National Biography
- Margaret Bowker (1968), The Secular Clergy in the Diocese of Lincoln, 1495 to 1520
- A. Hamilton Thompson (editor) (1940), Visitations in the Diocese of Lincoln 1517–1531. Vol I. Visitations of Rural Deaneries by William Atwater…1517–1520. (Publications of the Lincoln Record Society, Vol. 33.)

Academic offices
Preceded by Robert Smith	Vice-Chancellor of the University of Oxford; 1497–1498	Succeeded by Thomas Harpur
Preceded by Thomas Harpur	Vice-Chancellor of the University of Oxford; 1499–1501	Succeeded by Thomas Banke, Hugh Saunders
Preceded by Thomas Banke, Hugh Saunders	Vice-Chancellor of the University of Oxford; 1502–1503	Succeeded by John Thornden, John Kynton, Simon Grene
Catholic Church titles
Preceded by Thomas Wolsey	Bishop of Lincoln; 1514–1521	Succeeded by John Longland
