= Dokes =

Dokes is a surname. Notable people with the name include:

- Michael Dokes (1958–2012), American boxer
- Phil Dokes (1955–1989), American football player
- Talesha Dokes, American politician

== See also ==
- Doke
