= John Kynton =

English Franciscan friar and vice-chancellor

John Kynton (died 1536) was an English 16th-century Franciscan friar, divinity professor, and a vice-chancellor of the University of Oxford.

In 1500 Kynton graduated as a Doctor of Divinity at Oxford, where he was a Minorite or Friar Minor. He was appointed Vice-Chancellor of Oxford University as part of a committee several times annually during 1503–1513.

Kynton was a senior theologian at Oxford and preached the University sermon on Easter Sunday in 1515. He was among the four Doctors of Divinity appointed by the University in 1521 to consult with Thomas Wolsey about Lutheran doctrines and he assisted in a further examination of the reformer's works undertaken by the theologians at Oxford on the command of King Henry VIII. He is believed to have written at this time a treatise entitled "Contra Doctrinam Mart. Lutheri". He was the divinity reader at Magdalen College, and third Margaret Professor of Theology at Oxford University. He resigned the latter post in 1530. In 1530, he was one of the leading members of the committee of Oxford theologians to whom the question of the validity of King Henry VIII's marriage to Catherine of Aragon was referred.

Kynton died on 20 January 1536 (or 1535) and was buried in the chapel of Durham College, now Trinity College, Oxford.

== Bibliography ==
- Hibbert, Christopher, ed. (1988). The Encyclopaedia of Oxford. Macmillan. ISBN 0-333-39917-X.

Preceded by John Thornden, William Fauntleroy	Vice-Chancellor of the University of Oxford; 1503–1505	Succeeded by Simon Grene, John Roper, John Adams
Preceded by John Thornden, John Avery, John Kynton	Vice-Chancellor of the University of Oxford; 1507–1508	Succeeded by William Fauntleroy, John Thornden
Preceded by William Fauntleroy, Thomas Drax, John Roper, John Cockys, Edmund Wylsford	Vice-Chancellor of the University of Oxford; 1512–1514	Succeeded by John Thornden, Lawrence Stubbs, Edmund Wylsford, Hugh Whytehead
