= Richard Benger =

English university vice-chancellor

Richard Benger was an English 16th-century university vice-chancellor.

Benger was a Doctor of Decretals and a Fellow of New College, Oxford. In 1520, Benger was appointed Vice-Chancellor of the University of Oxford.

== Bibliography ==
- Hibbert, Christopher, ed. (1988). The Encyclopaedia of Oxford. Macmillan. ISBN 0-333-39917-X.

Academic offices
Preceded by William Broke	Vice-Chancellor of the University of Oxford; 1520–1523	Succeeded by Thomas Musgrave
