= John Langstrother =

Prior and Treasurer of England (died 1471)

Sir John Langstrother

Lord High Treasurer
- In office 16 August – 25 October, 1469
- Preceded by: Richard Woodville
- Succeeded by: William Grey
- In office 20 October, 1470 – 20 April, 1471
- Preceded by: John Tiptoft
- Succeeded by: Henry Bourchier

Personal details
- Died: 6 May, 1471 Tewkesbury, Gloucestershire, England
- Resting place: Clerkenwell, London, England

Sir John Langstrother (died 6 May, 1471) was Treasurer of England, prior of the Knights of St John in England, and Preceptor of Balsall.

A son of Thomas Langstrother of Crosswaite, he was by 1463 a councillor of the Yorkist king Edward IV. He was an administrator of the Knights of St John of Jerusalem and on 9 March 1469 was unanimously chosen as Prior of England, the Order's chief officer in the kingdom. Following the defeat of Edward's supporters by the Earl of Warwick on 26 July 1469 at the Battle of Edgecote Moor he was appointed Lord High Treasurer by the short-lived regime of the Duke of Clarence and Warwick, but was dismissed by Edward when he regained power in mid-September. He was reinstated in October 1470 as Treasurer and Warden of the Mint after the temporary re-accession of Henry VI, who had been restored with the help of Clarence and Warwick. Langstrother's tenures as Lord High Treasurer and Warden of the Mint occurred during the Great Bullion Famine and the Great Slump in England.

After the Yorkist victory at the Battle of Tewkesbury on 4 May 1471, where he had shared command of the Lancastrian centre, he sought sanctuary in Tewkesbury Abbey but was taken out and executed in Tewkesbury town centre two days later. He was buried in the Order's hospital of St John at Clerkenwell.

== See also ==
- The Crusades
- HM Treasury

Political offices
Preceded by Richard Woodville	Lord High Treasurer; 1469	Succeeded by William Grey
Preceded by John Tiptoft	Lord High Treasurer; 1470–1471	Succeeded by Henry Bourchier
