= John Tiptoft, 1st Earl of Worcester =

English nobleman and scholar (1427–1470)

John Tiptoft KG
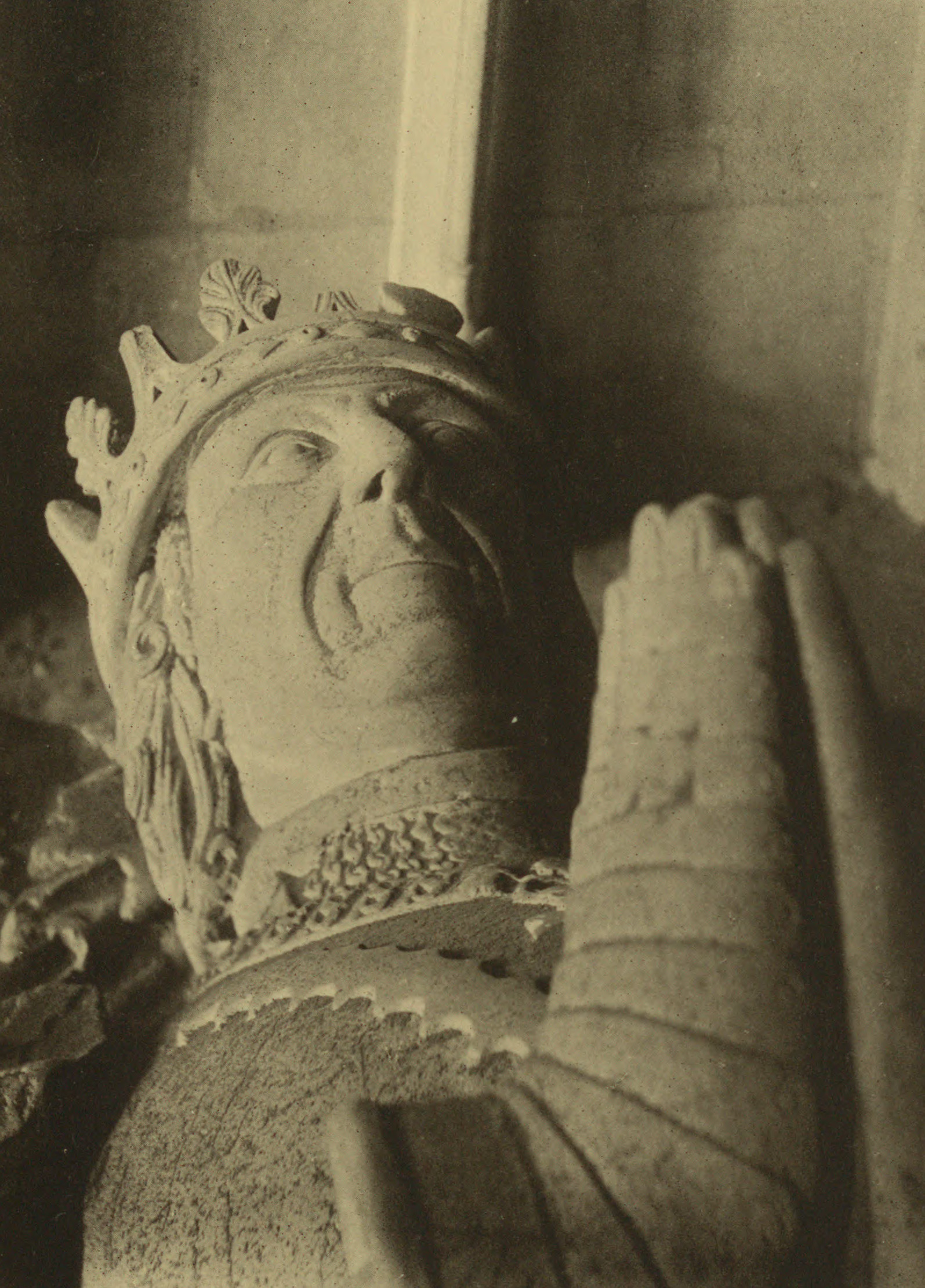
- Monumental effigy to the Earl of Worcester, Ely Cathedral.

Lord High Treasurer
- In office 15 April 1452 – 15 March 1455
- Preceded by: John Beauchamp
- Succeeded by: James Butler
- In office 14 April 1462 – 24 June 1463
- Preceded by: Henry Bourchier
- Succeeded by: Edmund Grey
- In office 10 July – 18 October 1470
- Preceded by: William Grey
- Succeeded by: John Langstrother

Lord High Constable of England
- In office 1461–1467
- Preceded by: Humphrey Stafford
- Succeeded by: Richard Woodville

Constable of the Tower
- In office December 1461 – 18 October 1470
- Preceded by: Henry Bourchier
- Succeeded by: John Sutton

Lord Steward
- In office 1463–1467
- Preceded by: William Neville
- Succeeded by: Henry Bourchier

Lord Deputy of Ireland
- In office 1467–1468
- Preceded by: Thomas FitzGerald, 7th Earl of Desmond
- Succeeded by: Thomas FitzGerald, 7th Earl of Kildare

Personal details
- Born: 8 May 1427 Great Eversden, Cambridgeshire, England
- Died: 18 October 1470 (aged 43) Tower Hill, London, England
- Resting place: Blackfriars, City of London, England

John Tiptoft, 1st Earl of Worcester KG (8 May 1427 – 18 October 1470), was an English nobleman and scholar who served as Lord High Treasurer, Lord High Constable of England and Lord Deputy of Ireland. He was known as "the Butcher of England" to his Tudor detractors.

== Life ==
=== Birth and education ===
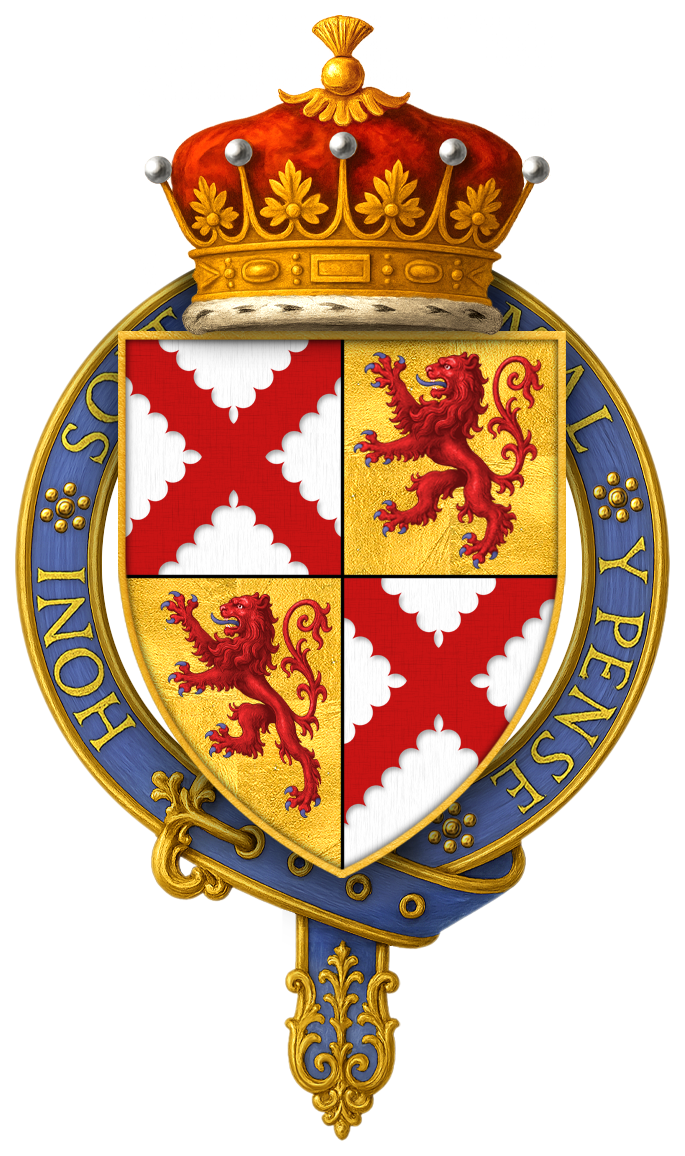
Arms of Sir John Tiptoft, 1st Earl of Worcester, KG: Quarterly 1 and 4: Argent, a saltire engrailed gules (Tiptoft); 2 and 3: Or, a lion rampant gules (Charleton)

Born at Great Eversden in 1427, he was the son of John Tiptoft, 1st Baron Tiptoft, and Joyce Cherleton, co-heiress of Edward Charleton, 5th Baron Cherleton. He was notable for his education, studying at University College at Oxford University from the ages of 13 to 16.

Through his father, he was a descendant of Charlemagne and through his mother he was a descendant of Llywelyn the Great and Edward I of England.

=== Marriages and children ===
He married thrice:

1. Cecily Neville, Duchess of Warwick, daughter of Richard Neville, 5th Earl of Salisbury, in 1449, by whom he had no issue. She died 28 July 1450.
2. Elizabeth Greyndour (d. 1452), daughter and sole heiress of Robert (d. 1443) of and Joan Greyndour of Clearwell, Gloucestershire. They had one son, John, who died the year of his birth, 1452.
3. Elizabeth Hopton (b. c. 1445, d. 22 June 1498), daughter of Sir Thomas Hopton and Eleanor Lucy; granddaughter of Sir Walter Hopton and widow of Sir Roger Corbet of Moreton Corbet (d. 8 June 1467). They married at Ludlow about September 1467, and received a pardon for marrying without a licence dated 9 May 1468. They had a son, Edward, who died unmarried in 1485.

=== Career ===
He enjoyed a brilliant early career. After being created Earl of Worcester on 16 July 1449, he was employed in a number of official posts, first as Lord High Treasurer (1452–1454) and then as Lord Deputy of Ireland (1456–1457). He then departed on a pilgrimage to the Holy Land in 1458, and returned by way of Italy, where he stayed for two years, studying at the University of Padua. There he gained a considerable reputation as a scholar of Latin.

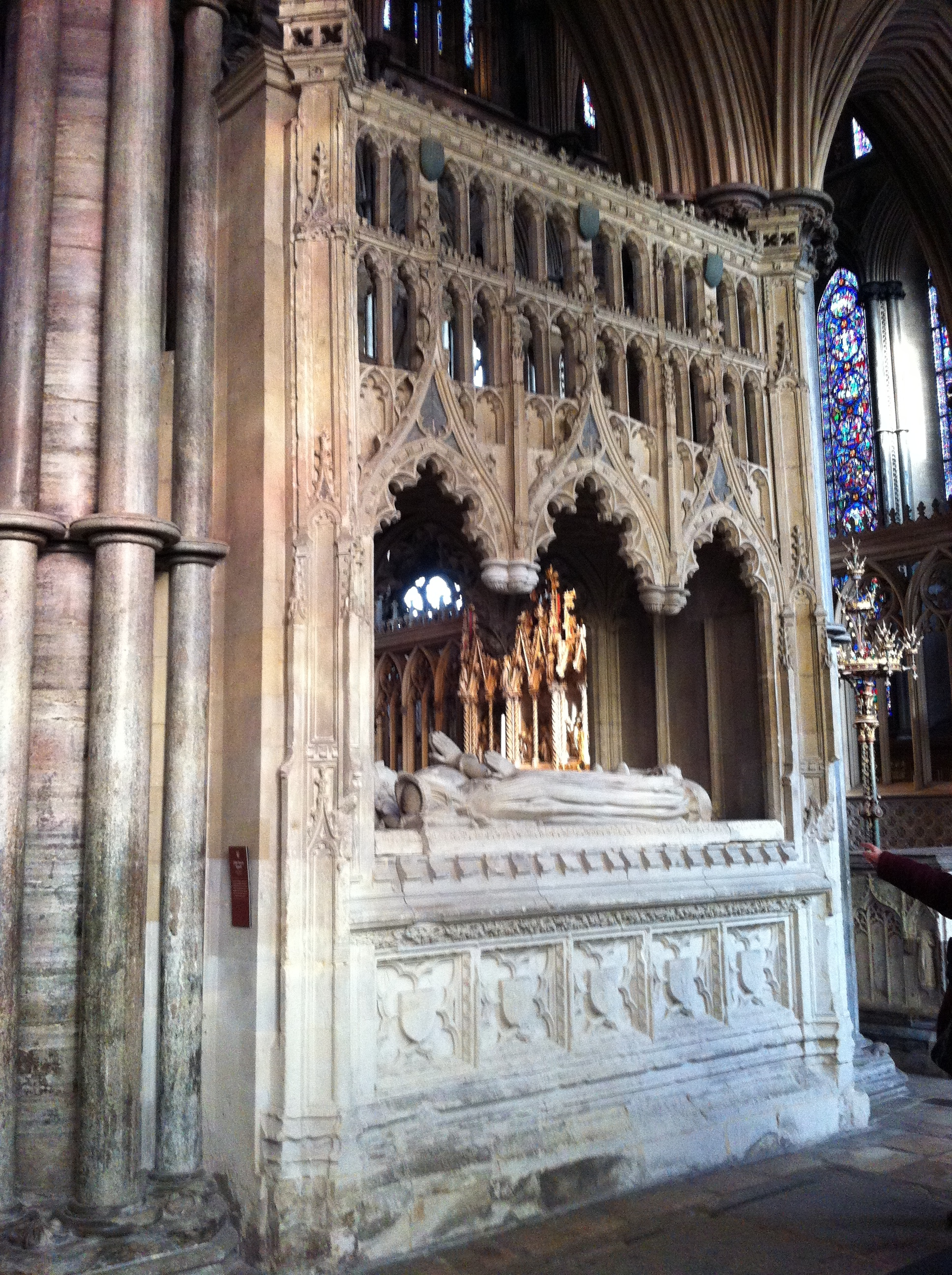
Memorial to John Baron Tiptoft, Earl of Worcester in Ely Cathedral

He returned to England in 1461 and was received with favour by Edward IV, receiving the Order of the Garter and being appointed to a number of posts, including in 1461, Constable of the Tower of London for life and in 1463, Lord Steward of the Household. Most notably, as Lord High Constable (1462), he presided over trials which resulted in the attainders and executions of Lancastrians, an office which he carried out with exceptional cruelty, having them beheaded, quartered, and impaled.

In 1464, he was appointed Chancellor of Ireland for life and, in 1467, he again became Lord Deputy of Ireland, and brought about the execution of Thomas FitzGerald, 7th Earl of Desmond. Tiptoft served again as Lord High Treasurer from 1462 to 1463, and again from July to October 1470. Tiptoft's tenure as Lord High Treasurer occurred during the Great Bullion Famine and the Great Slump in England.

=== Death ===
Upon the Readeption of Henry VI in 1470, Tiptoft was unable to escape with Edward IV and his supporters. He was captured by the Lancastrians and beheaded at the Tower of London, attainted and his title forfeited. His last act was to ask the executioner to chop off his head with three blows, for the sake of the Trinity.

The title "2nd Earl of Worcester" was the only peerage restored to his minor son Edward, on 14 April 1471, although no regent is named. His son Edward died in 1485, while still a minor, and without issue. The titles thus became extinct on his death, or in abeyance between his aunts as co-heiresses.

== Bibliography ==
- Kingsford, Charles Lethbridge (1911). "Worcester, John Tiptoft, Earl of" . In Chisholm, Hugh (ed.). Encyclopædia Britannica. Vol. 28 (11th ed.). Cambridge University Press. pp. 820–821.
- Kohl, Benjamin. "Tiptoft, John, 1st earl of Worcester". Oxford Dictionary of National Biography (online ed.). Oxford University Press. doi:10.1093/ref:odnb/27471. (Subscription, Wikipedia Library access or UK public library membership required.)
- Mitchell, R. J. (1938). John Tiptoft (1427–1470). Longmans.
- Mitchell, R. J. (1965). The Spring Voyage: The Jerusalem Pilgrimage in 1458. Readers Union.
- Spring, Peter (2018). Sir John Tiptoft, 'Butcher of England': Earl of Worcester, Edward IV's Enforcer and Humanist Scholar. Pen and Sword.

Political offices
Preceded by The Lord Beauchamp of Powick	Lord High Treasurer; 1452–1455	Succeeded by The Earl of Ormond
Preceded by The Earl of Essex	Lord High Treasurer; 1461–1463	Succeeded by The Lord Grey de Ruthin
Preceded by Humphrey Stafford, 1st Duke of Buckingham	Lord High Constable; 1461–1467	Succeeded by Richard Woodville, 1st Earl Rivers
Preceded by William Grey	Lord High Treasurer; 1470	Succeeded by John Langstrother
Peerage of England
New creation	Earl of Worcester; 1449–1470	Succeeded by Edward Tiptoft
Preceded by John Tiptoft	Baron Tiptoft; 1443–1470	Succeeded by Edward Tiptoft
