= Richard FitzJames =

15th and 16th-century Bishop of Chichester, Bishop of Rochester, and Bishop of London

- Bishop of London
- Appointed: 5 June 1506
- Term ended: 15 January 1522
- Predecessor: William Barons
- Successor: Cuthbert Tunstall
- Previous posts: Bishop of Rochester; Bishop of Chichester

Orders
- Consecration: 21 May 1497

Personal details
- Died: 15 January 1522
- Denomination: Catholic Church
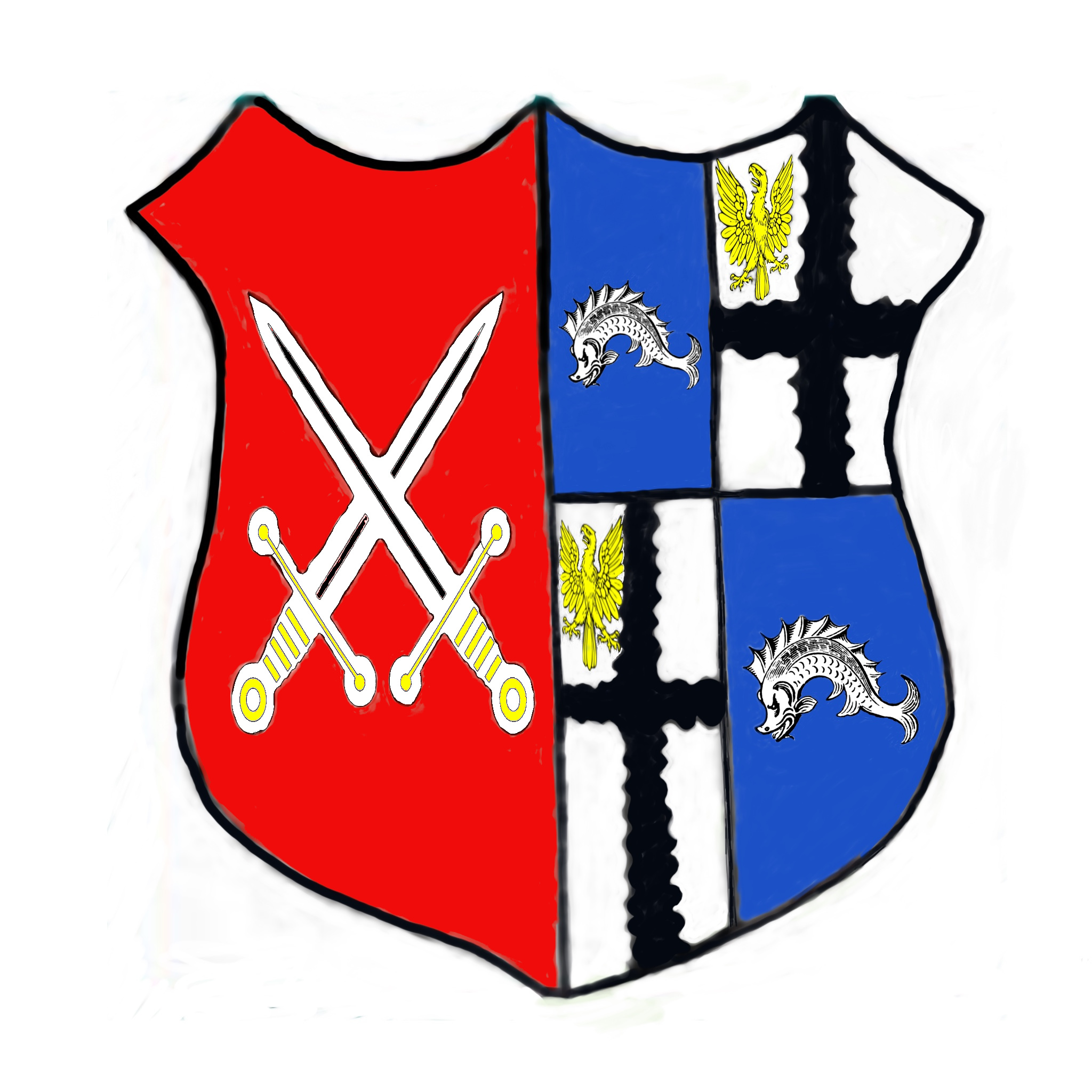
- Coat of arms

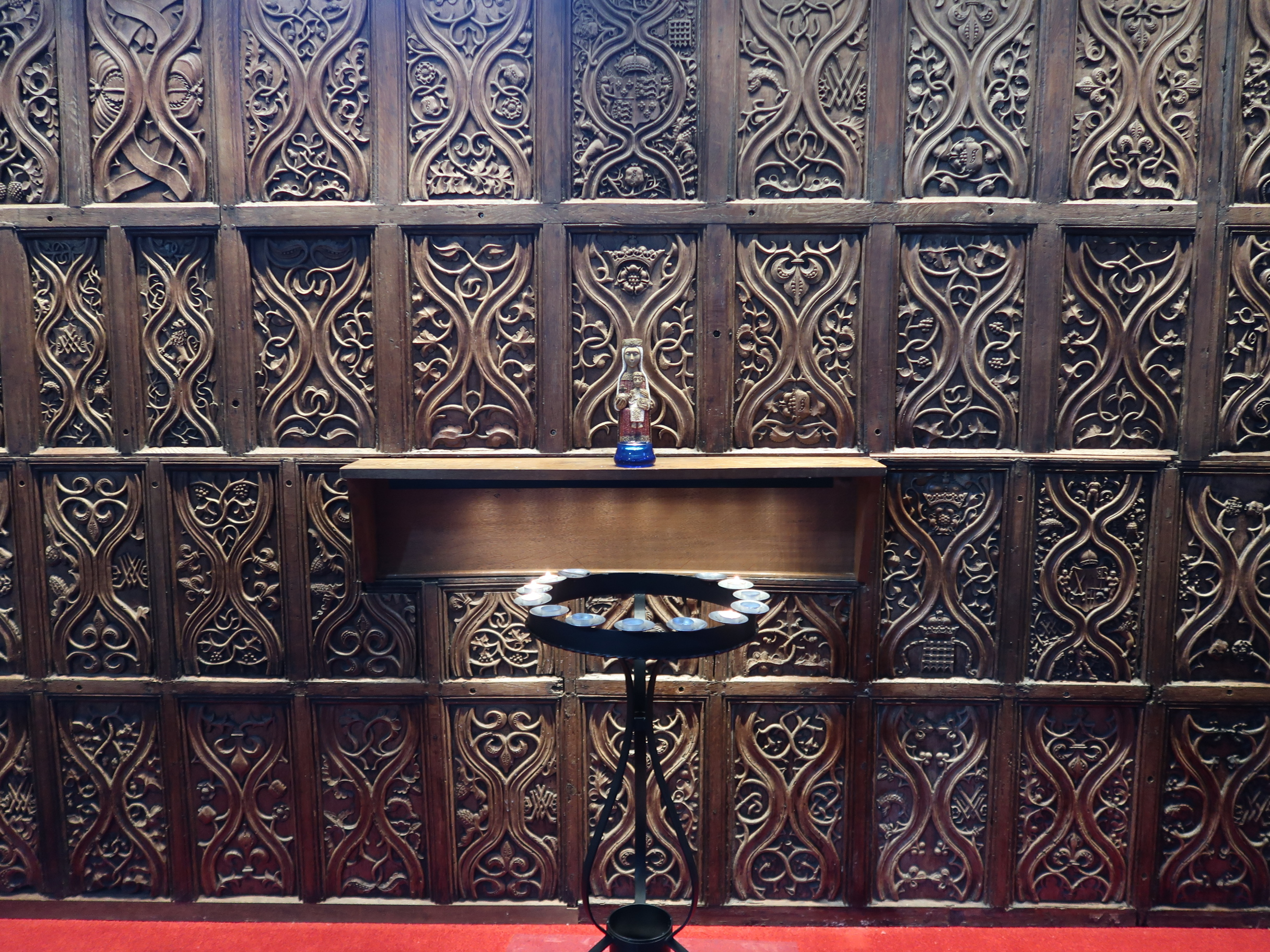
Steyning Screen

Richard FitzJames (died 1522) was an English academic and administrator who became successively Bishop of Rochester, Bishop of Chichester, and Bishop of London.

== Origins ==
Born about 1442, he was the son of John FitzJames (died 1476), who lived at Redlynch in Somerset, and his wife Alice Newburgh. The judge Sir John FitzJames was his nephew.

== Career ==
He was principal of St Alban Hall, Oxford from 1477 to 1481, and Vice-Chancellor of Oxford University in 1481 and 1491.

He was nominated to the see of Rochester on 2 January 1497 and consecrated on 21 May 1497, being translated to the see of Chichester on 29 November 1503. He was translated from Chichester to the see of London about 5 June 1506.

He died in London on 15 January 1522, and was buried in a tomb he had prepared for himself in the nave of Old St Paul's Cathedral, with his arms being depicted on the ceiling. During his life he had co-founded a school in his native Somerset, now known as King's School Bruton, which he remembered in his will dated 11 April 1518.

== Steyning Screen ==
He probably commissioned wooden panelling, originally for the Bishop of London's Palace at Fulham, which, eventually, became a screen now displayed in the Parish Church of St Andrew and St Cuthman in Steyning, West Sussex. It commemorates the wedding of Henry VIII and Catherine of Aragon, bearing the Royal Arms and Catherine's pomegranates, as well as Richard FitzJames Coat of Arms and the date 1522. It is suggested that it would be an embarrassment after the divorce and so it was removed from Fulham Palace.

Academic offices
Preceded by John Lane, William Sutton	Vice-Chancellor of Oxford University; 1481	Succeeded by Robert Wrangwais, William Sutton
Preceded by John Gigur	Warden of Merton College, Oxford; 1482–1507	Succeeded by Thomas Harper
Preceded by John Coldale	Vice-Chancellor of Oxford University; 1491	Succeeded by John Coldale
Catholic Church titles
Preceded by Thomas Savage	Bishop of Rochester; 1497–1503	Succeeded by John Fisher
Preceded by Edward Story	Bishop of Chichester; 1503–1506	Succeeded by Robert Sherburne
Preceded by William Barnes	Bishop of London; 1506–1522	Succeeded by Cuthbert Tunstall
