= Daniel Bernard =

Daniel Bernard may refer to:

- Daniel Bernard (academic) (died 1588), English clergyman and scholar
- Daniel Bernard (businessman) (1946–2026), French businessman
- Daniel Bernard (politician) (born 1959), Canadian serving as Member of the National Assembly
- Daniel Bernard (war criminal) (1914–1962), Dutch war criminal, see Operation Silbertanne
- Daniel Bernard (diplomat) (1941–2004), French Ambassador to the United Kingdom
- Daniel Bernard Roumain (born 1970), American classically trained composer, performer, violinist and band-leader
- Daniel Bernard (footballer) (1949–2020), French footballer
