= Elyas de Daneis =

English university vice-chancellor

Elyas de Daneis was an English medieval university vice-chancellor. In 1230, Elyas de Daneis became the first Vice-Chancellor of the University of Oxford.

== Bibliography ==
- Hibbert, Christopher, ed. (1988). The Encyclopaedia of Oxford. Macmillan. ISBN 0-333-39917-X.
