= Edward Vaughan (bishop) =

Welsh bishop (died 1522)

Edward Vaughan (or Wagham) (died 1522) was a Welsh bishop of St David's, remembered for construction work in his diocese.

== Life ==
He is assumed to have been of Welsh origin, according to some a native of South Wales. He was born about the middle of the fifteenth century, and was educated at Cambridge, where he graduated LL.D. On 21 June 1487 he was instituted to the church of St. Matthew, Friday Street, London, and subsequently became vicar of St Mary's Church, Islington also. At St. Paul's Cathedral he was successively promoted to the prebend of Reculverland, on 15 April 1493, that of Harleston, 16 November 1499, and was made treasurer 10 November 1503, holding along with the latter the prebend of Bromesbury in the same church. He built a house near St. Paul's for his successors in the treasurership, and distributed five hundred marks to the poor in London in time of dearth. He was made archdeacon of Lewes in 1509, and on 22 July in the same year, vacating his London appointments, he was consecrated bishop of St. David's, to which he was promoted by the pope's bull of provision dated 13 January 1509.

He erected at St. David's the chapel which still bears his name. On its walls he placed three coats-of-arms his own, those of Henry VII, and of Sir Rhys ap Thomas, probably a past patron, and who spent his latter days at Carew Castle, close to Lamphey, at that time an episcopal residence. He remodelled and roofed the lady chapel and its ante-chapel, while the roof of the nave, and probably also the porch and the upper stage of the tower, belong to his period. He also built the chapel at Lamphey, and John Leland ascribes to him the chapel of St. Justinian (now in ruins), the chapel at Llawhaden Castle, where Vaughan often resided, and a great barn (now destroyed) at Lamphey. The interior decoration of Hodgeston church is supposed to be his.

Vaughan died in November 1522, and was buried in the chapel which he built and which bears his name. Over him was placed a marble tomb, with his effigy in brass; what now remains is a large slab of shell marble, immediately in front of the altar.

Catholic Church titles
Preceded by Robert Sherborne	Bishop of St David's; 1509–1522	Succeeded by Richard Rawlins
