= Robert Thwaits =

English medieval academic administrator

Robert Thwaits (also Thwayts and Thwaytes) was an English medieval academic administrator.

Thwaits was the Vice-Chancellor of Oxford University on 1441 and 1453. He was the Chancellor of Oxford University during 1445–6. From 1450 until 1465, he was the Master of Balliol College, Oxford.

== Bibliography ==
- Hibbert, Christopher, ed. (1988). The Encyclopædia of Oxford. Macmillan. ISBN 0-333-39917-X.

Academic offices
Preceded by John Gorsuch	Vice-Chancellor of the University of Oxford; 1441	Succeeded by William Babington
Preceded by Luke Lacock	Vice-Chancellor of the University of Oxford; 1453	Succeeded by Thomas Saunders
Preceded by Thomas Gascoigne	Chancellor of the University of Oxford; 1445–1446	Succeeded by Gilbert Kymer
Preceded by William Brandon	Master of Balliol College, Oxford; 1450–1465	Succeeded by William Lambtone
