= Thomas Bourchier (cardinal) =

English archbishop and lord chancellor (1404–1486)

His Eminence Thomas Bourchier
- Cardinal, Archbishop of Canterbury; Primate of All England
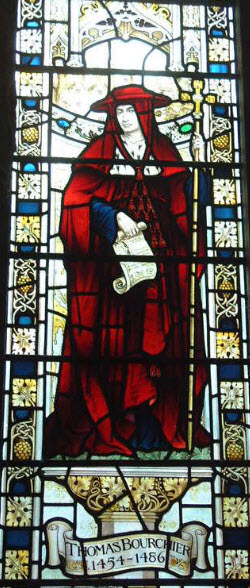
- 1909 stained glass depiction in Sevenoaks Church, Kent, of Thomas Bourchier, wearing a cardinal's galero (a broad-brimmed hat). His residence of Knole House, which he built, was situated opposite the church
- Church: Catholic Church
- Appointed: 23 April 1454
- Installed: 26 January 1455
- Term ended: 30 March 1486
- Predecessor: John Kemp
- Successor: John Morton

Orders
- Ordination: 1433
- Consecration: 15 May 1435 by Henry Beaufort
- Created cardinal: 18 September 1467 by Paul II
- Rank: Cardinal priest

Personal details
- Born: 1404
- Died: 30 March 1486 (aged 81–82) Knole House
- Buried: Canterbury Cathedral
- Education: University of Oxford

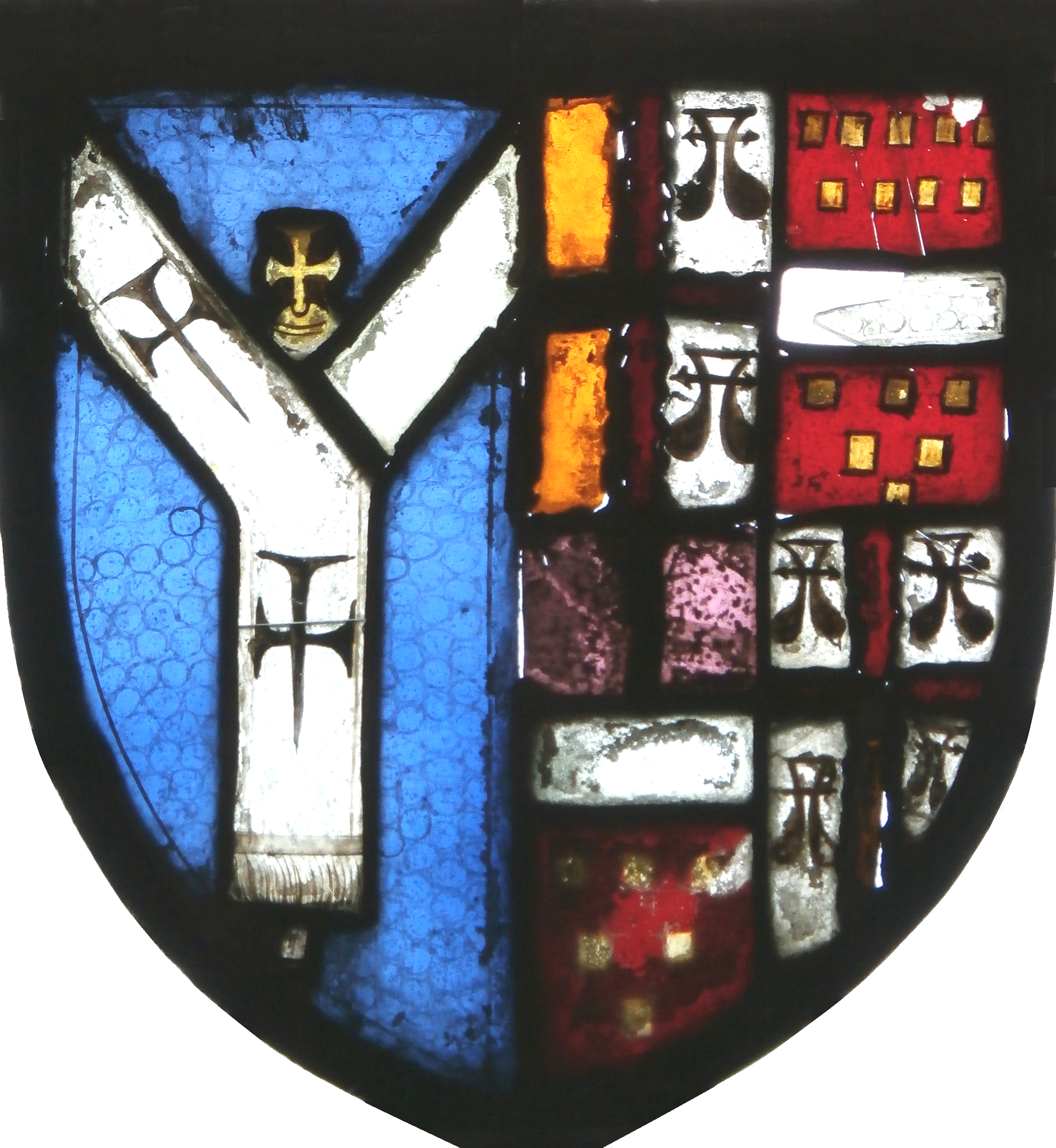
- Coat of arms

Thomas Bourchier (1404 – 30 March 1486) was a medieval English cardinal, Archbishop of Canterbury, and Lord Chancellor of England.

== Origins ==
Bourchier was a younger son of William Bourchier, 1st Count of Eu (died 1420) by his wife Anne of Gloucester, a daughter of Thomas of Woodstock (1355–1397), youngest son of King Edward III. One of his brothers was Henry Bourchier, 1st Earl of Essex (died 1483), and his great-nephew was John Bourchier, 2nd Baron Berners, the translator of Froissart. Humphrey Stafford, 1st Duke of Buckingham was his half-brother.

He was educated at the University of Oxford, after which he entered the church and obtained rapid promotion.

== Career ==
After holding some minor appointments he was consecrated Bishop of Worcester on 15 May 1434. In the same year of 1434 he was Chancellor of the University of Oxford, and in 1443 was appointed Bishop of Ely. In April 1454 he was made Archbishop of Canterbury, and became Lord Chancellor of England in March 1455.

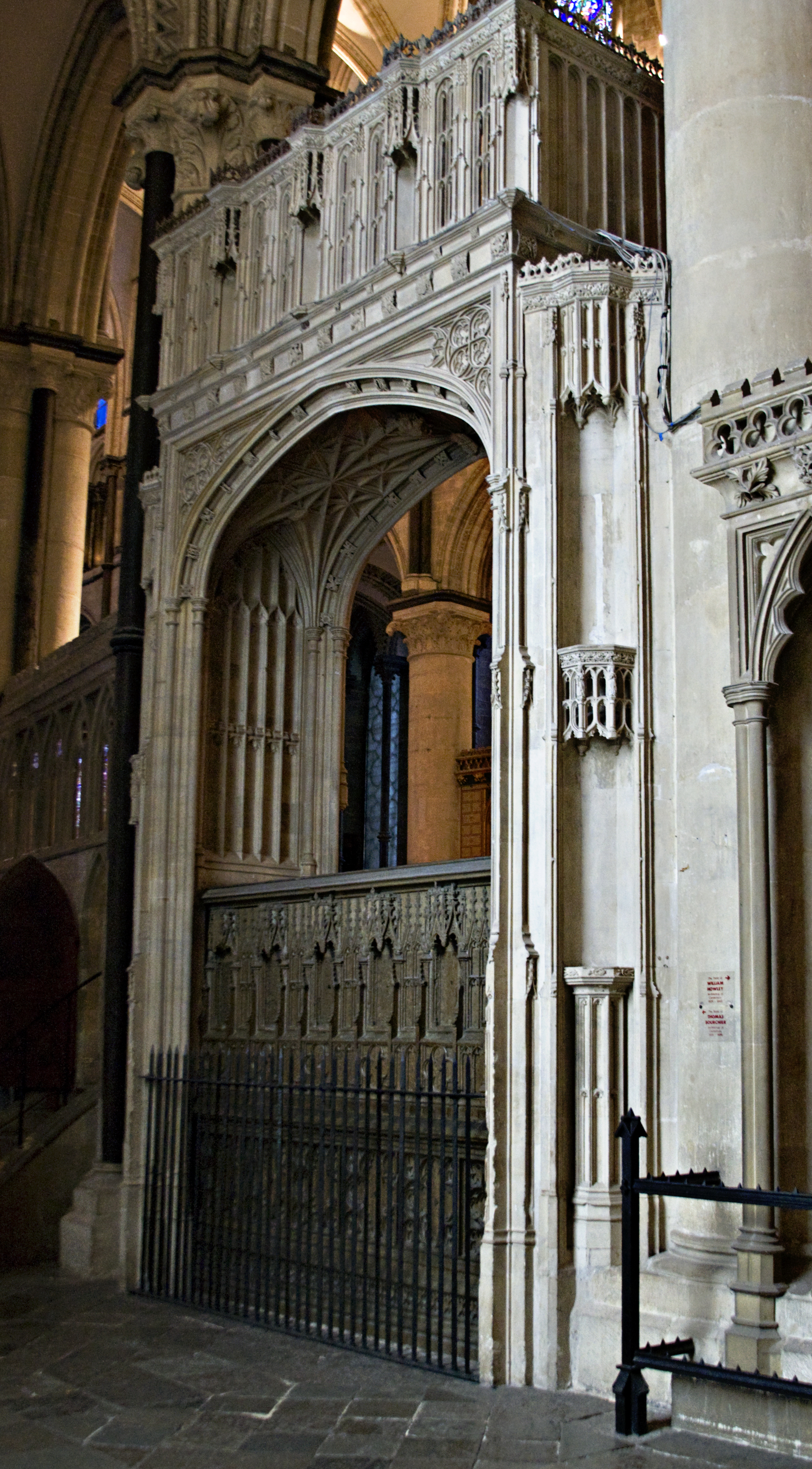
Tomb of Thomas Bourchier in Canterbury Cathedral

Bourchier's short term of office as chancellor coincided with the start of the Wars of the Roses, and at first he was not a strong partisan, although he lost his position as chancellor when Richard Plantagenet, 3rd Duke of York, was deprived of power in October 1456. In 1458 he helped to reconcile the contending parties as part of The Love Day, but when the war was renewed in 1459 he had become a decided Yorkist. He crowned Duke Richard's son Edward Plantagenet, 4th Duke of York as King Edward IV in June 1461, and four years later he crowned Edward's queen, Elizabeth Woodville.

In 1457 Bourchier took the chief part in the trial for heresy of Reginald Pecock, Bishop of Chichester. In 1473 he was created a cardinal, not after some delay as this honour had been sought for him by King Edward IV in 1465. In 1475 he was one of the four arbitrators appointed to arrange the details of the Treaty of Picquigny between England and France. After the death of King Edward IV in 1483 Bourchier persuaded the queen to allow her younger son, Richard of Shrewsbury, Duke of York, to join his elder brother King Edward V in (supposedly protective) residence in the Tower of London. Although Bourchier had sworn, before his father's death, to be faithful to King Edward V, he nevertheless crowned King Richard III in July 1483.

The third English king crowned by Bourchier was King Henry VII (1485–1509), whom he also married to Elizabeth of York in January 1486.

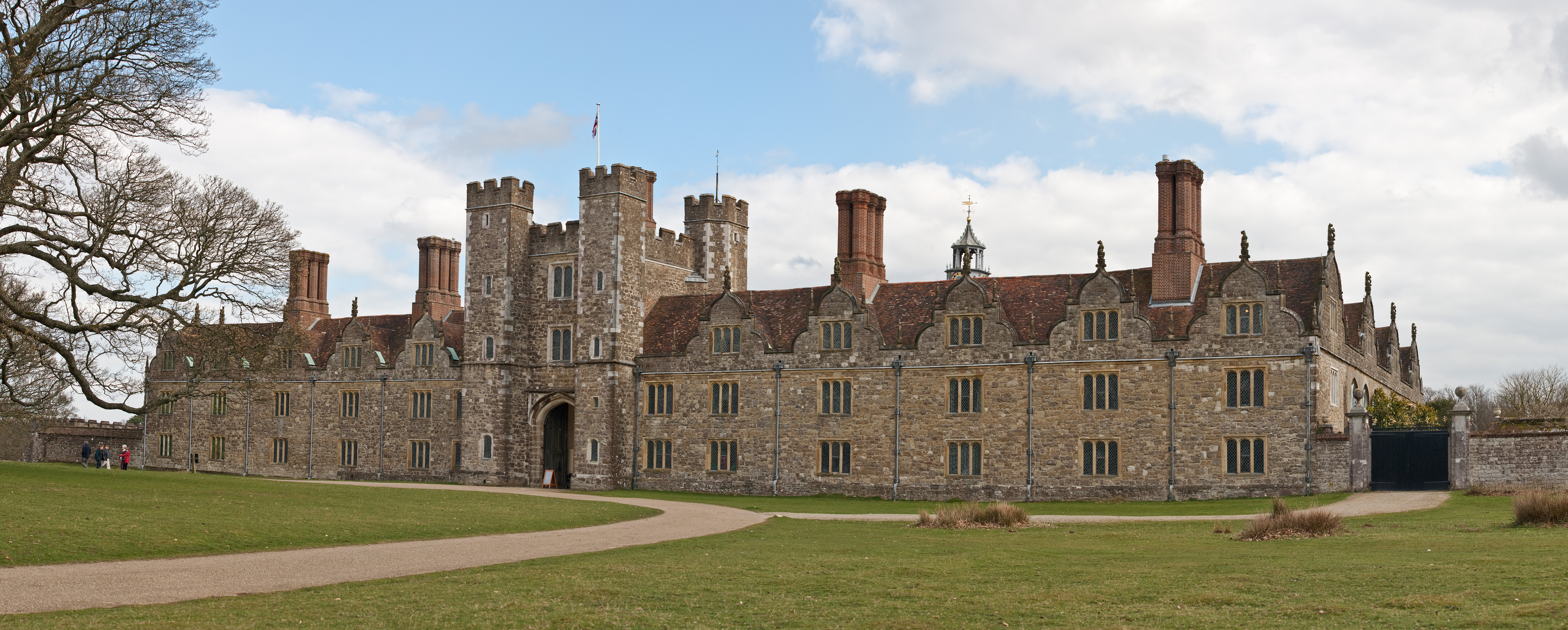
Knole House, Kent

== Death and burial ==
Bourchier died on 30 March 1486 at the palatial residence he had transformed, Knole House, near Sevenoaks in Kent, and was buried in Canterbury Cathedral, where his monument can be found.

== Citations ==
Academic offices
Preceded by Gilbert Kymer	Chancellor of the University of Oxford; 1433–1437	Succeeded by John Carpenter
Political offices
Preceded by The Earl of Salisbury	Lord Chancellor; 1455–1456	Succeeded by William Waynflete
Catholic Church titles
Preceded by Thomas Brunce	Bishop of Worcester; 1434–1443	Succeeded by John Carpenter
Preceded by Lewis of Luxembourg	Bishop of Ely; 1443–1454	Succeeded by William Grey
Preceded by John Kemp	Archbishop of Canterbury; 1454–1486	Succeeded by John Morton
Preceded by Dénes Szécsi	Cardinal priest of San Ciriaco alle Terme Diocleziane; 1467–1486	Succeeded by Bernardino Lunati
