= Walter Wright (academic) =

English academic administrator

Walter Wright LL.D. was an English academic administrator at the University of Oxford.

Wright was a Doctor of Law. He served as vice-chancellor of Oxford University from 1547 until 1550.

Wright was also Archdeacon of Oxford nfrom 1543 until his death in 1561.

Academic offices
Preceded by William Tresham	Vice-Chancellor of Oxford University; 1547–1550	Succeeded by William Tresham
Church of England titles
Preceded by Richard Curwen	Archdeacon of Oxford; 1543–1561	Succeeded by John Kennall
