= Francis Willis (academic) =

Francis Willis D.D. (a.k.a. Francis Wyllis; died 1597) was an academic administrator at the University of Oxford and Dean of Worcester.

In 1577, Willis was elected President of St John's College, Oxford, a post he held until 1590. While President at St John's College, he was also Vice-Chancellor of Oxford University from 1587 until 1588. He was also a canon of Bristol Cathedral, of which city he was said to be a native.

Willis was Dean of Worcester from 1586 until his death in 1597.

Academic offices
Preceded by Toby Mathew	President of St John's College, Oxford; 1577–1590	Succeeded by Ralph Hutchison
Preceded by Daniel Bernard	Vice-Chancellor of Oxford University; 1587–1588	Succeeded by Martin Heton
