= Edmund Lilly (academic administrator) =

English academic administrator

Edmund Lilly D.D. (died 7 February 1610) was an English academic administrator at the University of Oxford.

Lilly became Master (head) of Balliol College, Oxford on 1 August 1580, a post he held until his death in 1610. During his time as Master of Balliol, he was twice Vice-Chancellor of Oxford University for the periods 1585–1586 and 1593–1596. Lilly was deemed an "excellent divine".

Academic offices
Preceded by Adam Squier	Master of Balliol College, Oxford; 1585–1586	Succeeded by Robert Abbot
Preceded by John Underhill	Vice-Chancellor of Oxford University; 1585–1586	Succeeded by Daniel Bernard
Preceded by Nicholas Bond	Vice-Chancellor of Oxford University; 1593–1596	Succeeded by Thomas Ravys
