= Richard Rawlins =

Welsh bishop (died 1536)

Richard Rawlins (died 1536) was Bishop of St David's between the years 1523 and 1536.

He graduated B.D. in 1492, D.D. in 1495, was a fellow in 1480, and warden of Merton College, Oxford in 1508 to 1521. He was installed rector of St. Mary Woolnoth, London in 1494, canon of St. Paul's in 1499, vicar of Hendon, Middlesex in 1504, vicar of Thornton, Yorkshire in 1505 and subdean of York from 1504 to 1507. He was made a canon of Windsor in 1506 and Archdeacon of Cleveland in 1507 (to 1523).

After spending two years with the king in France, where he was present at the sieges of Turwin and Tournay, he was installed as rector of St. Martin, Ludgate in 1514 and collated Archdeacon of Huntingdon (1514–23). He was appointed Lord Almoner in 1514 and consecrated Bishop of St. David's in 1523, holding the seat until his death in 1536.

Whilst Warden of Merton College, Oxford, he was known for selling land designated for the completion of a cruciform chapel for the establishment of Corpus Christi College (as a result the chapel remains T-shaped and set an example for the shape of subsequent college chapels).

Academic offices
Preceded by Thomas Harper	Warden of Merton College, Oxford; 1508–1521	Succeeded by Roland Philips
Religious titles
Preceded by Edward Vaughan	Bishop of St David's; 1523–1536	Succeeded by William Barlow
