= William Broke =

English college head and vice-chancellor

William Broke (or Brook) was an English 16th-century college head and university vice-chancellor at the University of Oxford.

Broke was a Doctor of Decretals and a Warden of All Souls College, Oxford between 1504 and 1524. In 1520, Broke was appointed Vice-Chancellor of Oxford University.

== Bibliography ==
- Hibbert, Christopher, ed. (1988). The Encyclopaedia of Oxford. Macmillan. ISBN 0-333-39917-X.

Academic offices
Preceded by Thomas Hobbs	Warden of All Souls College; 1504–1524	Succeeded by John Cole
Preceded by Richard Duck	Vice-Chancellor of the University of Oxford; 1520–1520	Succeeded by Richard Benger
