= William Tresham (priest) =

English priest and university official

William Tresham (1495–1569) was an English priest in the Tudor period and an official of the University of Oxford.

== Life ==
William Tresham was born in Oakley Magna, Northamptonshire in 1495. He obtained various degrees from the University of Oxford as a member of Merton College – Bachelor of Arts (BA) in 1515, Master of Arts (MA) in 1520, Bachelor of Theology in 1528, and Doctor of Theology in 1532. In between these achievements, he served as Registrar of the university from 1524 to 1520 and was ordained as a priest in 1526. He later served as Vice-Chancellor of the University of Oxford (from 1532 to 1547, then again in 1550, 1556 and 1558), and also held offices at Merton College.

He was appointed as a canon of Cardinal College, holding this position when it was refounded as King Henry VIII College and then Christ Church, Oxford). His parish posts included St Mary Magdalen, Oxford, and Bampton, Oxfordshire, and Bugbrooke and Towcester (both in Northamptonshire), with additional appointments as Chancellor of Chichester Cathedral and as a canon of Lincoln Cathedral. He was a "theological conservative" during the turbulent religious changes during his lifetime, and was regarded as "forthright, active, and intelligent." By 1551, his views of the religious line taken by Edward VI led to his imprisonment in the Fleet Prison, but he was released when Mary I came to the throne in 1553, with whose opinions he was more in sympathy. He refused, however, to swear the required oath of supremacy when Elizabeth I came to power, although he had offered her congratulations upon her succession on behalf of Oxford (along with the Warden of Merton, Thomas Raynolds). As a result, he was removed from all his positions, save only the rectory of Towcester, and held at Lambeth Palace until he promised not to interfere with religious matters. He died in 1569 and was buried in Bugbrooke.

Academic offices
Preceded by John Cottisford	Vice-Chancellor of the University of Oxford; 1532–1547	Succeeded by Walter Wright
Preceded by Walter Wright	Vice-Chancellor of the University of Oxford; 1550–1551	Succeeded by Owen Oglethorpe
Preceded by Richard Smyth	Vice-Chancellor of the University of Oxford; 1556	Succeeded by Thomas Raynolds
Preceded by Thomas Whyte	Vice-Chancellor of the University of Oxford; 1558–1559	Succeeded by John Warner
