= Thomas Musgrave (academic) =

English university vice-chancellor

Thomas Musgrave (or Moscrof) was an English 16th-century university vice-chancellor.

Musgrave was a Doctor of Physic and a Fellow of Merton College, Oxford. In 1523, Musgrave was appointed Vice-Chancellor of the University of Oxford.

== Bibliography ==
- Hibbert, Christopher, ed. (1988). The Encyclopaedia of Oxford. Macmillan. ISBN 0-333-39917-X.

Academic offices
Preceded by Richard Benger	Vice-Chancellor of the University of Oxford; 1523–1527	Succeeded by Martin Lyndsey
