= John Bernard (author) =

English academic and writer

- Born: Yorkshire, the West Riding
- Died: 1550
- Occupation(s): academic and religious author
- Known for: Latin devotional work Oratio Pia

John Bernard (died 1554) was an English academic and religious author. He is known for a Latin devotional work Oratio Pia that was published some 14 years after his death, and then translated into English.

== Life ==
Bernard was from Yorkshire, and is thought to have been from the West Riding. He was a student at Queens' College, Cambridge, where he was a scholar in 1541. He proceeded B.A. in 1543–4. He became Trotter's priest there about 1544, and a Fellow shortly afterwards that year. He commenced M.A. in 1547.

Bernard was bursar of his college from 1550 to 1552. At the beginning of the reign of Mary I of England, he retained his fellowship, he retained his fellowship, despite reforming and evangelical Protestant views, and that year was licensed to preach. He died in 1554.

== Works ==
Bernard composed Oratio pia, religiosa, et solatii plena, de vera animi tranquillitate. It was found in the author's study, after his death, and published at London, 1568, with a dedication to the courtier Peter Osborne, by his brother Thomas Bernard who edited the work. A translation into English, by Anthony Marten, was published under the title of The Tranquillitie of the mind: an excellent Oration directing every man and woman to the true tranquillity and quietness of the minde, London, 1570.

The book is considered an example of the Protestant belles lettres of the period, comparable with works of the Huguenot minister Jean de L'Espine, and of Jeremias Bastingius from Middelburg.

== Family ==
Bernard was the brother of Thomas Bernard (died 1582) and uncle of Daniel Bernard.
