= Richard Duck =

English college fellow and university vice-chancellor

Richard Duck (also Doke or Dooke) was an English 16th-century college fellow and university vice-chancellor at the University of Oxford.

Duck was a Doctor of Divinity and a Fellow of Exeter College, Oxford. In 1517, Duck was appointed Vice-Chancellor of Oxford University, continuing until 1520.

Duck was appointed Archdeacon of Salisbury in 1536.

== Bibliography ==
- Hibbert, Christopher, ed. (1988). The Encyclopaedia of Oxford. Macmillan. ISBN 0-333-39917-X.

Preceded by Lawrence Stubbs	Vice-Chancellor of the University of Oxford; 1517–1519	Succeeded by Richard Barnack
Preceded by Richard Barnack	Vice-Chancellor of the University of Oxford; 1519–1520	Succeeded by William Broke
