= Malshanger =

Village in Hampshire, England

Coordinates: 51.2689°N 1.1870°W

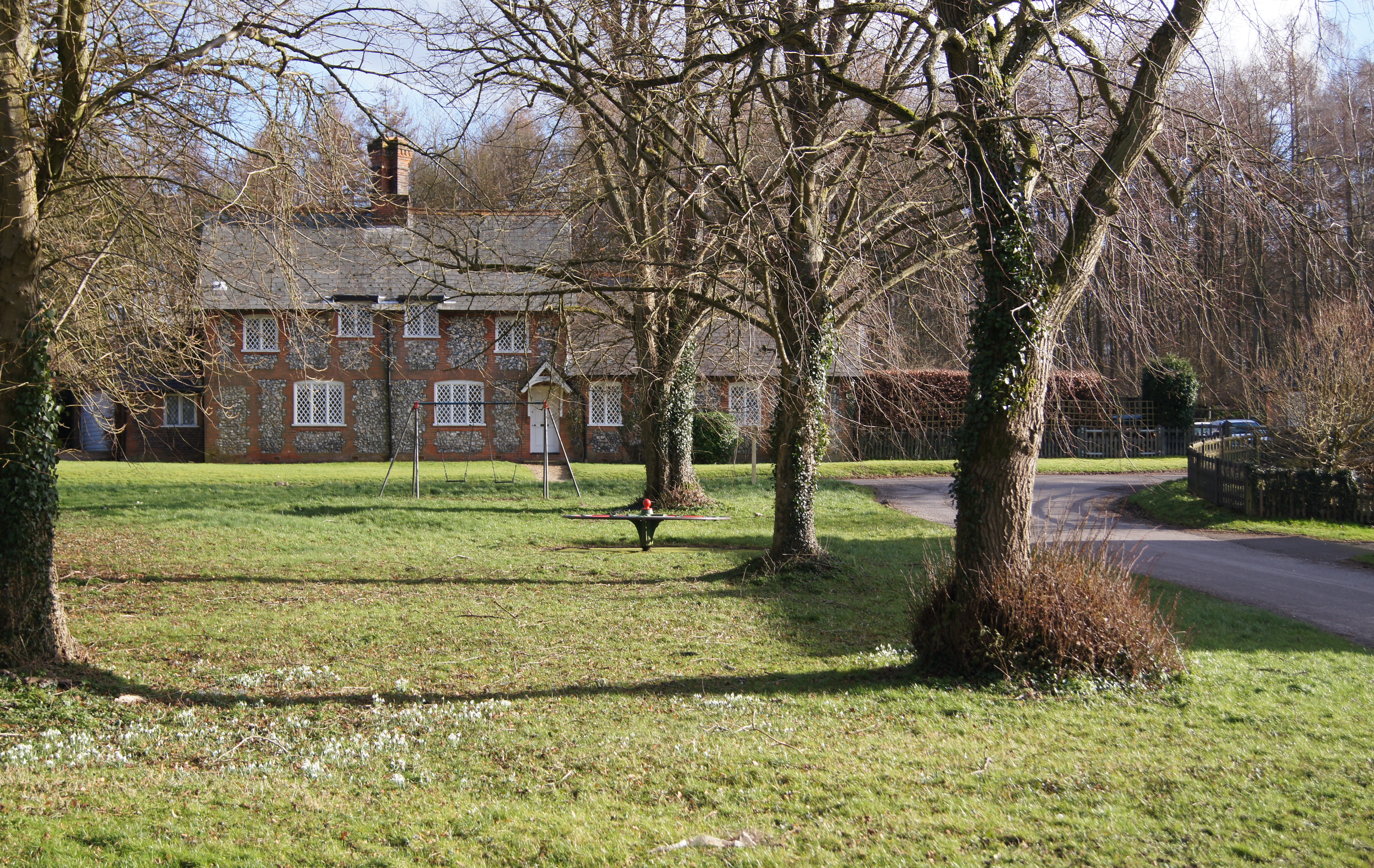
- Play area

- Location within Hampshire
- OS grid reference: SU5681352507
- Civil parish: Oakley
- District: Basingstoke and Deane
- Shire county: Hampshire
- Region: South East
- Country: England
- Sovereign state: United Kingdom
- Post town: BASINGSTOKE
- Postcode district: RG23
- Dialling code: 01256
- Police: Hampshire and Isle of Wight
- Fire: Hampshire and Isle of Wight
- Ambulance: South Central
- UK Parliament: Basingstoke

Malshanger is a small village in the Basingstoke and Deane district of Hampshire, England. Its nearest town is Basingstoke, which lies approximately 4.5 miles (7.1 km) south-east from the village.

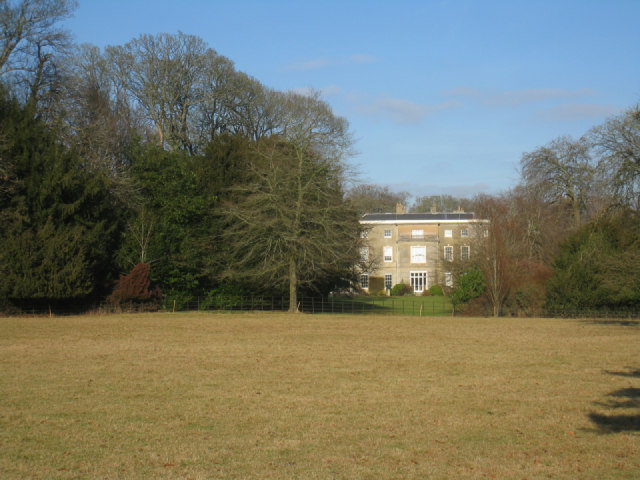
Malshanger House

== Governance ==
The village is part of the civil parish of Oakley, and is part of the Oakley and North Waltham ward of Basingstoke and Deane borough council.

== Notable people ==
- William Warham, Archbishop of Canterbury
- Charles Metcalfe, 1st Baron Metcalfe
