= Agnes Ashford =

Christian evangelist

Agnes Ashford (fl. 15th century) was a Christian evangelist.

In the 15th century, Bishop Longland of Lincoln was investigating the activities of the Lollards. His people were informed that Ashford had taught "part of the Sermon on the Mount" to James Morden. Before six bishops, Ashford was warned not to teach these things, even to her own children. Witnesses against her included her son Thomas Tredway, who testified that she had forbidden him to "worship the images of saints" (see idolatry, iconoclasm).
