= Robert Hovenden =

English academic administrator

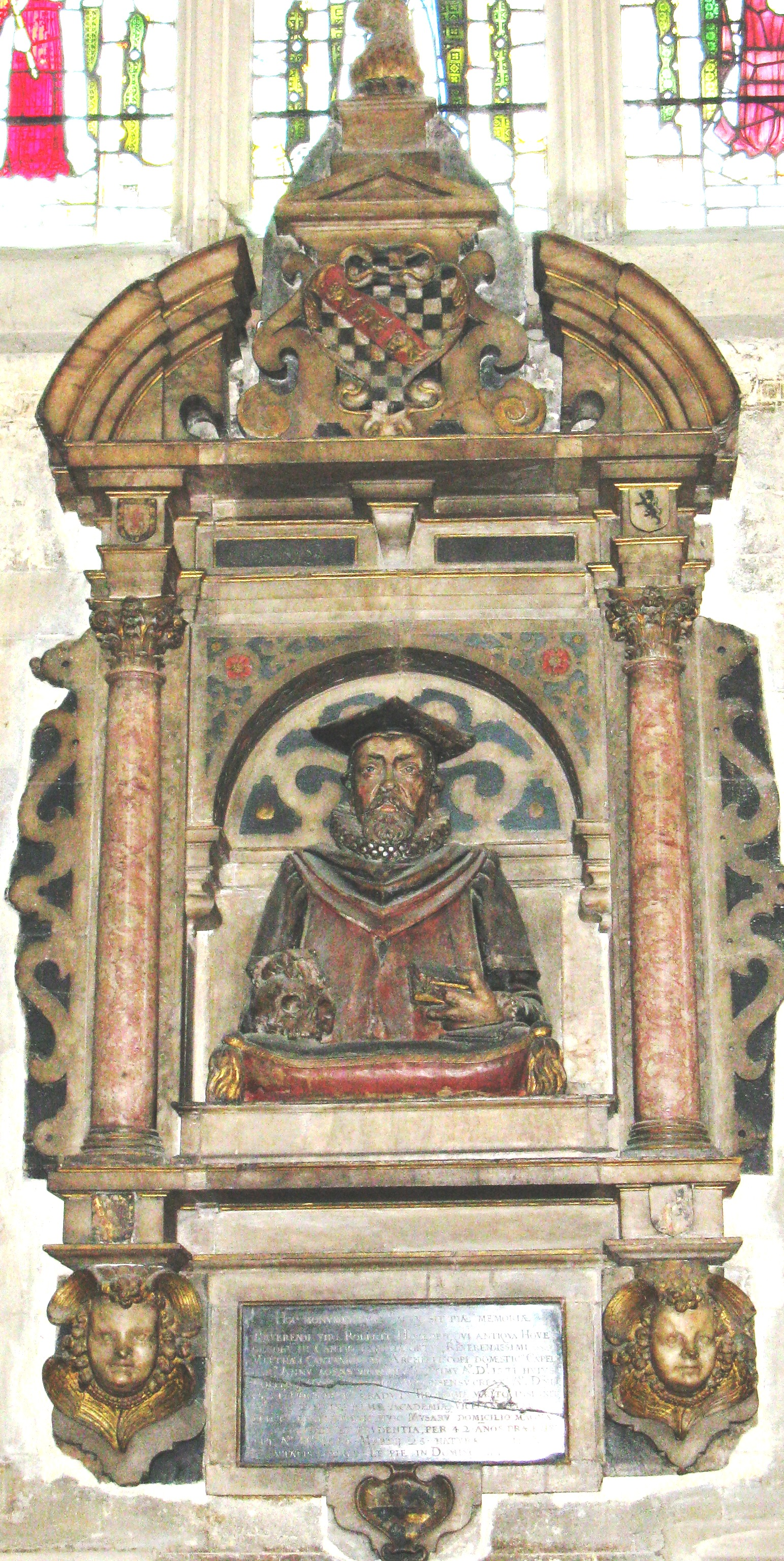
Funerary monument of Rev. Dr. Robert Hovenden in the All Souls College Chapel at Oxford.

Robert Hovenden D.D. (1544–1614) was an English academic administrator at the University of Oxford.

Hovenden was elected Warden (head) of All Souls College, Oxford in 1571, a post he held until 1614. During his time as Warden of All Souls College, he was also Vice-Chancellor of Oxford University during 1582–3. Hovenden was a humanist, undertook building work for All Souls College, and produced strip maps of the college estates.

== Life ==
He was the eldest son of William Hoveden or Hovenden of Canterbury. He was educated at the University of Oxford, was elected a Fellow of All Souls' College in 1565, and graduated BA in the following year, and MA in 1570. He became chaplain to Archbishop Matthew Parker, and in 1570 or 1571 held the prebend of Clifton in Lincoln Cathedral.

On 12 November 1571, Hovenden succeeded Richard Barber as Warden of the college. In 1575 he supplicated for the degree of BD, but proceeded no further until 1580, when he performed all the exercises for the degrees of B.D. and DD, making the pretensions of the Pope the subject of his disputations. He was licensed as D.D. in 1581. In 1582, he filled the office of Vice-Chancellor of Oxford University. In 1581 he was holding, with his wardenship, the prebend of Henstridge in Wells Cathedral, and in 1589 the third prebend in Canterbury Cathedral.

Hovenden entered on his duties as Warden of All Souls while the college was striving to preserve its Catholic 'monuments of superstition' in the chapel from demolition, but in December 1573 the orders of the commissioners in the matter were too stringent to be any longer disobeyed. Hovenden exerted himself, however, to secure the profitable management of the college estates. He caused to be made a series of maps of the collegiate property which are still in existence. He successfully resisted the request of Queen Elizabeth that the college should grant a lease of certain lands to Lady Stafford on terms which would have been disadvantageous to the college, although the lady herself offered the warden £100. Hovenden succeeded in recovering for the college the rectory of Stanton Harcourt, Oxfordshire, which had been granted to it by Cardinal Pole, but resumed by the crown on the accession of Elizabeth. He completed the Warden's lodgings, which had been begun about fifteen years before; enlarged the grounds of the college by adding the site of a house known as 'The Rose,' where there was a famous well; rearranged the old library, now disused, and converted into rooms; introduced a better system of keeping the college books and accounts; and put in order and catalogued the archives.

Hovenden rigorously upheld his authority within the college. With the aid of the visitor, Archbishop Edmund Grindal, he compelled Fellows who desired to practice law or medicine in London to vacate their fellowships: his contest with Henry Wood, one of the Fellows, was related by John Strype. He carefully scrutinised claims to fellowships on the plea of founder's kin.

The main alteration which he made in the constitution of the college was the admission of poor scholars (servientes), who in 1612 numbered thirty-one, but they were discontinued during the Commonwealth and were later represented only by four bible clerks.

Hovenden died on 25 March 1614, and was buried in the college chapel, where there is his monument with an inscription. There was a bust of Hovenden in the Codrington Library at All Souls, executed by Sir Henry Cheere.

== Works ==
Hovenden wrote a life of Archbishop Chichele, the founder of All Souls', which was used by Sir Arthur Duck in his life of the archbishop (1617); and a catalogue of the wardens and fellows of the college.

== Family ==
Hovenden married Katherine, eldest daughter of Thomas Powys of Abingdon, and is doubtfully said to have had a daughter, Elizabeth, wife of Edward Chaloner, second son of Sir Thomas Chaloner of Steeple Claydon, Buckinghamshire.

He had two younger brothers. Christopher (1559–1610) was a Fellow of All Souls College (1575–81), member of the Middle Temple, and Rector of Stanton Harcourt (by presentation of All Souls). He was buried at Stanton Harcourt in 1610, having married Margery Powys, sister of the Warden's wife. The warden erected a monument over his grave. The second brother, George (1562–1625), was Rector of Harrietsham, Kent, a living also in the gift of All Souls, and held the tenth prebend in Canterbury Cathedral from 15 December 1609 till his death at Oxford 24 October 1625. Both brothers secured beneficial leases of college property.

Academic offices
Preceded by Richard Barber	Warden of All Souls College, Oxford; 1571–1614	Succeeded by Richard Moket
Preceded by William James	Vice-Chancellor of Oxford University; 1582–1583	Succeeded by Thomas Thornton
