= Thomas Gascoigne (academic) =

English medieval theologian and academic administrator

Thomas Gascoigne (1404–1458) was an English medieval theologian and academic administrator. He was twice Vice-Chancellor and twice Chancellor of Oxford University.

Thomas was born in Hunslet, near Leeds, only son to the lord of the manor at Leeds, Richard Gasgoigne and his wife Beatrix. Thomas's inheritance on Richard's death in 1422 gave him a reasonable degree of financial security throughout his life. He studied at Oxford from 1416 to 1420; was ordained a priest in 1427; and was appointed to the rectory of Kirk Deighton (about 15 miles north-west of Hunslet) in July 1433 (from which he resigned in 1443, apparently because his duties at Oxford prevented him from fulfilling pastoral duties in the rectory). He maintained his Oxford connections, however, and on 14 June 1434 he became a Doctor of Theology, serving as vice-chancellor and chancellor of the university at various points between 1439–45 and again, during a break between Chancellors, in 1453. Thus his career was focused on Oxford, although he was also chaplain to Henry VI sometime in the period 1434–45; had a brief spell at the rectory of St Peter's Cornhill, in London, from November 1445; and became a canon of Wells on 7 February 1449. February 8, 1449 saw Oriel College granting him rent-free accommodation for the rest of his life. Thomas died on 13 March 1458 and was buried in New College, Oxford.

Gascoigne compiled his magnum opus, Dictionarium Theologicum (or Liber de Veritatibus), between about 1434 and his death in 1458. In this, he reported the story of Chaucer's deathbed repentance for his literary sins.

Academic offices
| Preceded by John Burbach | Vice-Chancellor of Oxford University; 1434 | Succeeded by Nicholas Faux |
| Preceded by John Gorsuch, William Hawtrine | Vice-Chancellor of Oxford University; 1439 | Succeeded by John Gorsuch |
| Preceded by William Grey | Chancellor of Oxford University; 1442 | Succeeded by Henry Sever |
| Preceded by Henry Sever | Chancellor of Oxford University; 1443–1445 | Succeeded by Robert Thwaits |
