= Henry White (academic) =

English priest, academic and lawyer

Henry White LLD (died 1538) was an English priest, academic, and lawyer. He was Vice-Chancellor of the University of Oxford in 1531, and principal of the School of Canon Law.

== Life ==
Henry White was the eldest son of Robert White, a prosperous merchant of Farnham, in Surrey, and his wife Kateryn Wells. There were eight sons and three daughters living at the time of Robert's death in 1518, when Robert entailed his various lands and tenements in Hampshire, Surrey and Berkshire in six parcels upon his six elder sons, with reversion in default to the eldest of all surviving, sons having precedence over daughters. Henry's portion consisted of his father's lands and tenements in Aldershot and Camberley, but all the estates were first to be enjoyed by his mother during her lifetime.

Henry was a Fellow of New College, Oxford (which was associated with the school at Winchester College) from 1515 to 1527, where he took the degree of Bachelor of Civil Law on 4 July 1524, and Bachelor of Canon Law on 8 July 1527, proceeding to Doctor of Canon Law on 18 February 1527/28. He was principal of New Inn Hall in 1529-30, and was Vice-Chancellor of the University of Oxford in 1531. He became principal or chief moderator of the school of canon law. His brother John White the elder, future Bishop of Lincoln (1554-56), and Bishop of Winchester (1556-59), was also at New College from the late 1520s, taking B.A. in 1529 and M.A. in 1534: John then went on to be headmaster, and (from 1541) Warden of Winchester College.

Henry's will, made and proved in 1538, appointed as his executors Dr John London, Warden of New College, Dr John Holyman of Exeter College, Oxford (where Henry had a chamber), and Dr John White the elder. By the time of his death he had taken on administration of his brother Robert's will, on behalf of Robert's children: also (under the terms of his father's will) he had fallen heir to the patrimonies of his brothers Thomas and William, parts of which (Finchampstead, Cove and Winchfield) then passed to John the elder, while Henry's lands in Aldershot passed to the next brother, John White the younger (died 1573), afterwards Sir John, Member of Parliament and Lord Mayor of London.

Academic offices
Preceded by John Cottisford	Vice-Chancellor of the University of Oxford; 1531–1532	Succeeded by John Cottisford
