= William Barons =

- Bishop of London
- Church: Roman Catholic
- Diocese: Diocese of London
- Elected: 1504
- Term ended: 1505 (death)
- Predecessor: William Warham
- Successor: Richard FitzJames
- Other posts: Master of the Rolls; 1502–1504

Orders
- Consecration: 26 November 1504

Personal details
- Died: 1505
- Denomination: Roman Catholic
- Education: University of Oxford

William Barons (also Barnes; died 1505) was the Bishop of London from 1504 to 1505. He was also Master of the Rolls of the Court of Chancery from 1502 to 1504.

== Life ==
Remarkably little is known of his family background and early life. The little information we have comes from the Paston Letters, from which it is clear that he was related, though probably only distantly, to the Paston family. In 1504, on the death of Sir John Paston, he wrote to condole with the family on the death of "Cousin Paston".

He took the degree of LL.D. at the University of Oxford. On the vacancy of the archdiocese of Canterbury in 1500, he became commissary of the chapter and of the prerogative court. That same year he obtained the livings of East Peckham in Kent, and of Beaconsfield in Buckinghamshire; in 1501 that of Gedney in Lincolnshire; in 1502 that of Bosworth in Leicestershire; and in 1503 that of Tharfield in the archdeaconry of Huntingdon.

In 1501, at the marriage of Arthur, Prince of Wales, and Catherine of Aragon, when the banns were asked in St. Paul's Cathedral, it was arranged that the king's secretary should 'object openly in Latin against the said marriage', alleging reasons why it could not be lawful, and that he should be answered by Barons, who was to produce the dispensation. Barons, in high favour, was made master of the rolls on 1 February following (1502). On 24 January 1503 he assisted in laying the first stone of Henry VII's chapel at Westminster.

On 3 August 1504, he was appointed by papal provision bishop of London on William Warham's translation to Canterbury, Henry VII having written to Pope Julius II in his favour on 8 July preceding. He received the temporalities on 13 November and gave up his office of Master of the Rolls the same day. He was consecrated on 26 November; he died on 9 or 10 October 1505.

== Notes ==
Catholic Church titles
| Preceded by William Warham | Bishop of London; 1504–1505 | Succeeded by Richard FitzJames |
