= Thomas Reynolds (bishop) =

English bishop and academic

Thomas Reynolds (also "Reynold" or "Raynolds") (died c.1560) was an English bishop and academic. He was the Warden of Merton College, Oxford, from 1545 and was created Bishop of Hereford by Mary I.

== Life ==
A cleric of the reformed Church of England under Edward VI, after the Restoration he was a chaplain to Queen Mary, who gave him preferment and created him Dean of Exeter in 1555. He also served as Vice-Chancellor of the University of Oxford. On the accession of Elizabeth I, the formalities for his post as bishop were not yet complete and he was deprived. He died in the Marshalsea Prison.

Reynolds was the uncle of John Reynolds and William Reynolds, of a family near Pinhoe, Devon. Adam Hamilton has argued for a relationship to Richard Reynolds, and incidentally for an identification of Thomas Reynolds as a Catholic at an earlier period of his life.

Academic offices
Preceded by Henry Tindall	Warden of Merton College, Oxford; 1545–1559	Succeeded by James Gervase
Preceded by William Tresham	Vice-Chancellor of Oxford University; 1556–1557	Succeeded by Thomas Whyte
Church of England titles
Preceded by Robert Parfew	Bishop of Hereford; 1557–1558	Succeeded by John Scory
