= Henry Sever =

English divine and educational administrator

Henry Sever DD (died 1471) was an English medieval divine and educational administrator.

Sever became the senior proctor at Merton College, Oxford in 1427. Sever was the chaplain and almoner of King Henry VI. He was also the first Provost (head school governor) of Eton College, from 1440 to 1442. He was the Chancellor of Oxford University during 1442–3. He became Prebendary (1445) and then Chancellor (1449) of St Paul's Cathedral in London. From 1455 until his death in 1471, he was the Warden of Merton College, Oxford.

Academic offices
Preceded by None	Provost of Eton College; 1440–1442	Succeeded by William Waynflete
Preceded by Thomas Gascoigne	Chancellor of the University of Oxford; 1442–1443	Succeeded by Thomas Gascoigne
Preceded by Elias Holcot	Warden of Merton College, Oxford; 1455–1471	Succeeded by John Gigur
