= Thomas Thornton (academic administrator) =

Church of England priest and academic administrator (c.1541–1629)

Thomas Thornton (c.1541–1629) was an English Church of England clergyman and academic administrator.

Thornton received a Bachelor of Divinity degree followed by a Doctor of Divinity degree at Oxford University. He was based at Christ Church, Oxford and was a Canon of Christ Church Cathedral, Oxford. He was twice vice-chancellor at the University of Oxford during 1583–4 and 1599–1600. He was also Precentor of Hereford Cathedral from 1573, and Master of the Library there from 1595; he re-organized the library and had new bookcases installed on the model of those in the Bodleian Library

Academic offices
| Preceded by Robert Hovenden | Vice-Chancellor of Oxford University; 1583–1584 | Succeeded by John Underhill |
| Preceded by Thomas Singleton | Vice-Chancellor of Oxford University; 1599–1600 | Succeeded by George Abbot |
