= John Norton (academic) =

John Norton (died 1462) was a medieval churchman and university Chancellor.

Norton was a Doctor of Canon Law and a Fellow of New College, Oxford, from 1404 until 1421, when he left to join the Court of Arches. In 1433, he became the vicar-general of Salisbury. He joined the Bishop of Durham, Robert Neville, as Chancellor in Durham. He was Chancellor of the University of Oxford during 1439–40. In 1440, he became the vicar-general of York.

Academic offices
Preceded by Richard Praty	Chancellor of the University of Oxford; 1439–1440	Succeeded by Richard Roderham
