= John Burneby =

Archdeacon of Totnes from 1443 to 1453

John Burneby was Archdeacon of Totnes from 1443 until 1453; and Vice-Chancellor of the University of Oxford from 1447 to 1449.

Church of England titles
Preceded by Alan Kirketon	Archdeacon of Totnes; 1443–1453	Succeeded by Thomas Manning
