= Daniel Bernard (academic) =

English clergyman and scholar

Daniel Bernard D.D. (died 1588) was an English Church of England clergyman and scholar.

Bernard was based at Christ Church, Oxford. He was Canon of Christ Church Cathedral, Oxford from 1577. He received his Doctor of Divinity degree in 1585 and was vice-chancellor at the University of Oxford during 1586–7.

He was the brother of the author John Bernard (died 1554?) of Queens' College, Cambridge and the divine Thomas Bernard (died 1582), also a Canon of Christ Church.

Academic offices
Preceded by Edmund Lilly	Vice-Chancellor of Oxford University; 1586–1587	Succeeded by Francis Wyllis
