= William Goodwin (priest) =

English Anglican clergyman and academic

William Goodwin (died 1620) was an English Anglican clergyman and academic, Dean of Christ Church, Oxford from 1611.

== Life ==
He was a scholar of Westminster School, and was elected in 1573 to Christ Church, Oxford. In 1590 he is mentioned as sub-almoner to Queen Elizabeth, and prebendary of York. He accumulated the degrees of B.D. and D.D. 1602, and on resigning his prebend in 1605 he was appointed chancellor of York, an office which he retained with many other Yorkshire benefices until 1611, when he was promoted to the deanery of Christ Church.

In 1616 he became Archdeacon of Middlesex and rector of Great Allhallows, London; from the latter, however, he withdrew in 1617 on being presented to the living of Chalgrove, Oxfordshire. In 1616 he likewise received from the Lord-chancellor Thomas Egerton the living of Stanton St. John, Oxfordshire. He was vice-chancellor of Oxford in 1614, 1615, 1617, 1618, and died 11 June 1620, in his sixty-fifth year. His remains were interred in Christ Church Cathedral, where a monument was erected to his memory.

Goodwin, in his capacity of chaplain to James I, preached before the king at Woodstock 28 August 1614. This sermon was published at Oxford. He is also mentioned as having delivered sermons in memory of Henry Frederick, Prince of Wales 1612; of Sir Thomas Bodley, 1613; and of Anne of Denmark, 1618, at the chapel of St. Mary's, Oxford. Thomas Goffe preached his funeral sermon in Latin, published at Oxford in 1620.
