= John Longland =

English bishop

The Right Reverend John Longland
- Bishop of Lincoln
- Church: Roman Catholic/Church of England
- Diocese: Lincoln
- Appointed: 20 March 1521
- In office: 1521-1547
- Predecessor: William Atwater
- Successor: Henry Holbeach

Orders
- Consecration: 5 May 1521 by William Warham

Personal details
- Born: 1473 Henley-on-Thames, Oxfordshire, England
- Died: 7 May 1547 (aged 73–74) Wooburn, Buckinghamshire, England
- Buried: Eton College
- Parents: Thomas Longland & Isabel Staveley

John Longland (1473 – 7 May 1547) was an English cleric. He was Dean of Salisbury from 1514 to 1521 and Bishop of Lincoln from 1521 to his death in 1547.

== Career ==
He was made a Demy at Magdalen College, Oxford in 1491 and became a Fellow. He was King Henry VIII's confessor and was said to have been one of those who first persuaded the King that he should annul his marriage to Catherine of Aragon.

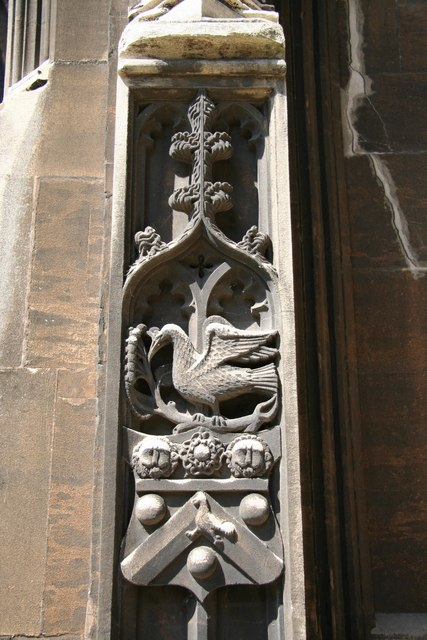
Arms of Bishop John Longland, Lincoln Cathedral

In 1519 he was appointed Canon of the sixth stall at St George's Chapel, Windsor Castle, a position he held until 1520. He was also Lord Almoner from c.1521. He was consecrated a bishop on 5 May 1521, by William Warham, Archbishop of Canterbury, assisted by John Fisher, Bishop of Rochester; Nicholas West, Bishop of Ely; and John Vesey, Bishop of Exeter.

During the English Reformation, he was among the conservative bishops, recognizing Transubstantiation. His conservatism is attested to by his complaint in 1536 to Thomas Cromwell about Protestant preachers in his diocese. Longland is referred to by John Foxe, the controversial Protestant martyrologist, as "a fierce and cruel vexer of the faithful, poor servants of Christ." Foxe claimed that Longland violently constrained men, women, and maidens to testify against one another, and that he delivered some over to the secular arm to be burned.

== See also ==
- Lollardy, a proto-protestant reform movement persecuted by Longland
- Agnes Ashford, a protestant proselytizer warned off by Longland
- List of chancellors of the University of Oxford

Religious titles
Preceded by William Atwater	Bishop of Lincoln; 1521–1547	Succeeded by Henry Holbeach
Academic offices
Preceded by William Warham	Chancellor of the University of Oxford; 1532–1547	Succeeded by Richard Cox
