= Doke =

Doke /ˈdoʊk/ is both a surname and a given name. Notable people with the name include:

- Clement Martyn Doke (1893–1980), South African linguist
- Larry Doke, Canadian politician
- Richard Doke, English 16th-century Vice-Chancellor of Oxford University
- Doke Schmidt (born 1992), Dutch footballer

== See also ==
- Doké, a town in Côte d'Ivoire
