= William Warham =

Archbishop of Canterbury from 1503 to 1532

The Most Reverend and Right Honourable William Warham
- Archbishop of Canterbury
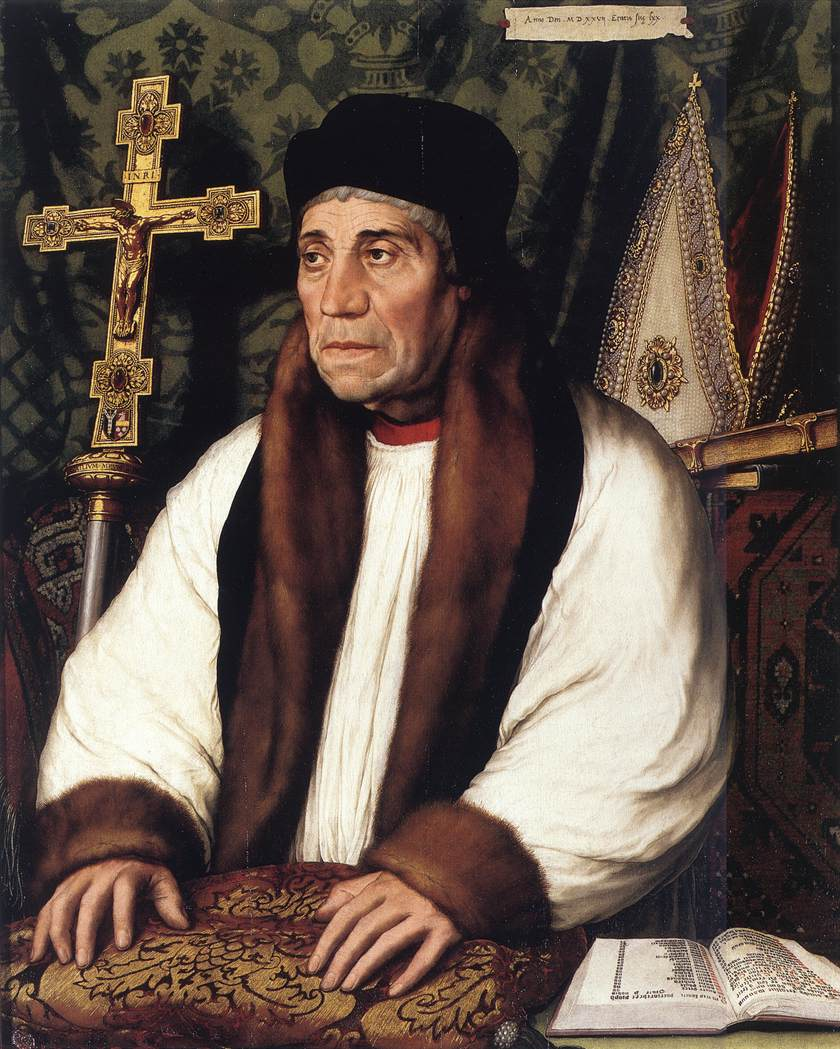
- Portrait by Hans Holbein the Younger (1527)
- Church: Catholic Church
- Appointed: 29 November 1503
- Term ended: 22 August 1532
- Predecessor: Henry Deane
- Successor: Thomas Cranmer

Orders
- Consecration: 25 September 1502 by Richard Foxe

Personal details
- Born: c. 1450 Malshanger, Hampshire, England
- Died: 22 August 1532 Hackington, Kent, England
- Buried: Canterbury Cathedral, Kent, England
- Parents: Robert Warham of Malshanger

William Warham (c. 1450 – 22 August 1532) was Archbishop of Canterbury from 1503 until his death in 1532.

== Early life and education ==
Warham was the son of Robert Warham of Malshanger in Hampshire. He was educated at Winchester College and New College, Oxford.

== Legal career ==
After graduating, Warham practised and taught law both in London and Oxford. His father was a tenant farmer, but his brother, Sir Hugh Warham, acquired an estate at Croydon, which passed to his daughter Agnes, who married Sir Anthony St Leger.

== Bishopric ==
Later, Warham took holy orders, held two livings (Barley and Cottenham) and became Master of the Rolls in 1494. Henry VII found him a useful and clever diplomatist. He helped to arrange the marriage between Henry's son, Arthur, Prince of Wales, and Catherine of Aragon. He went to Scotland with Richard Foxe, then bishop of Durham, in 1497. He was partly responsible for several commercial and other treaties with Maximilian I, Holy Roman Emperor, also Count of Flanders and Regent Duke of Burgundy, on behalf of his son Philip IV of Burgundy.

== Archbishopric ==
In 1502, he was consecrated Bishop of London and became Keeper of the Great Seal, but his tenure of both offices was short, as in 1504, he became Lord Chancellor and Archbishop of Canterbury. In 1506, he became Chancellor of Oxford University, a role he held until his death. In 1509, he presided over the wedding of and then crowned Henry VIII and Catherine of Aragon.

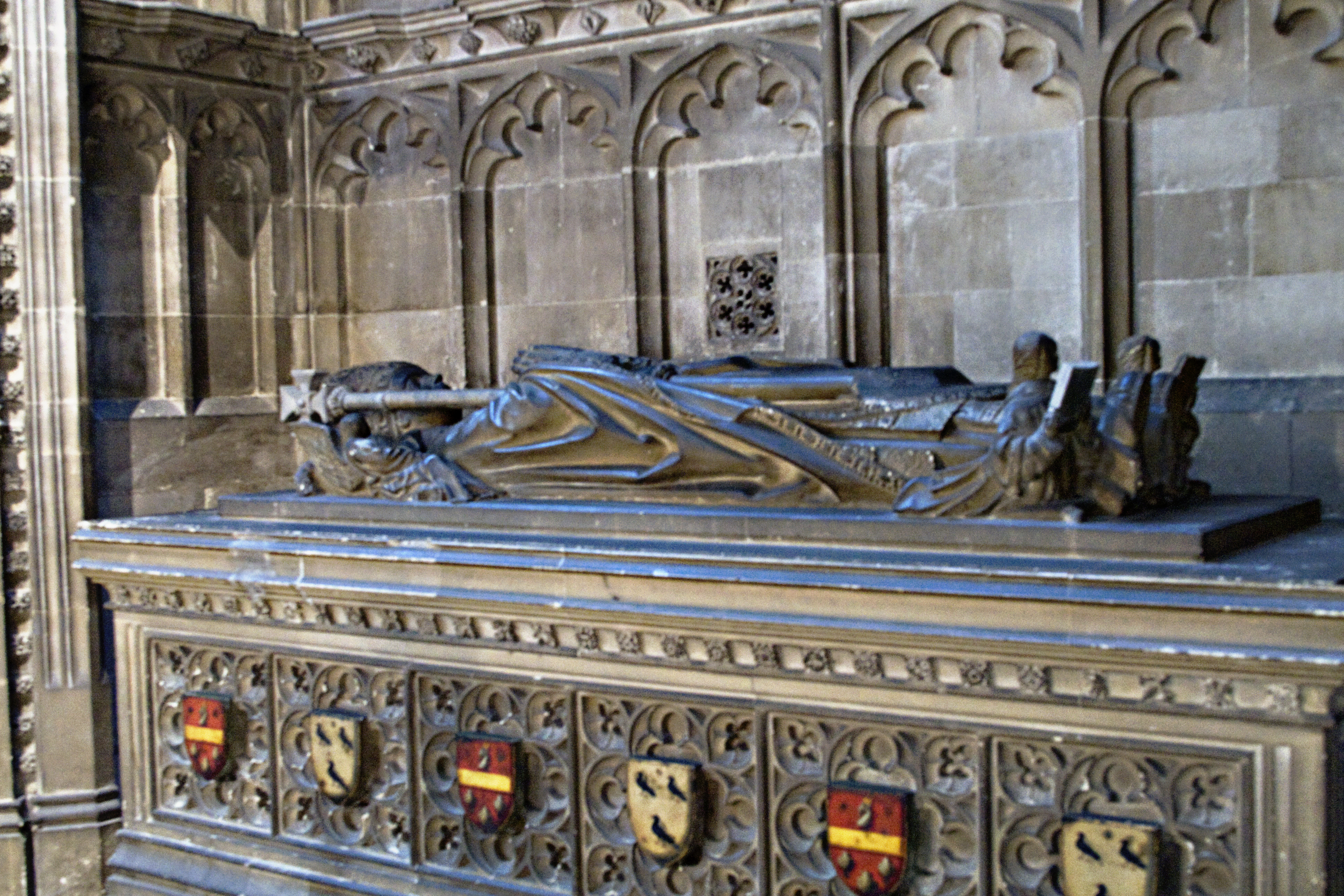
Warham's tomb in Canterbury Cathedral

On 28 September 1511, he made a visit to the hospital at Maison Dieu, Faversham.

As archbishop, Warham seems to have been somewhat arbitrary; for example, his actions led to a serious quarrel with Foxe, then Bishop of Winchester, and others in 1512. That made him gradually withdraw into the background after the coronation. He resigned the office of Lord Chancellor in 1515 and was succeeded by Thomas Wolsey, whom he had consecrated as bishop of Lincoln in the previous year. His resignation was possibly because of his dislike of Henry's foreign policy.

Warham was present at the Field of the Cloth of Gold in 1520 and assisted Wolsey as assessor during the secret inquiry into the validity of Henry's marriage with Catherine in 1527. Throughout the divorce proceedings, Warham's position was essentially that of an old and weary man. He was named as one of the counsellors to assist the queen, but, fearing to incur the king's displeasure and using his favourite phrase ira principis mors est ("the king's anger is death"), he gave her very little help and signed the letter to Pope Clement VII that urged the pope to assent to Henry's wish. Later, it was proposed that the archbishop himself should try the case, but the suggestion came to nothing.

Warham presided over the Convocation of 1531, when the clergy of the Province of Canterbury voted £100,000 to the king to avoid the penalties of praemunire and accepted Henry as supreme head of the church with the face-saving clause "so far as the Law of Christ allows".

In Warham's concluding years, however, the archbishop showed rather more independence. In February 1532, he protested against all acts concerning the church passed by the parliament that met in 1529, but that did not prevent the important proceedings which secured the complete submission of the church to the state later in the same year. Against this further compliance with Henry's wishes, Warham drew up a protest in which he likened the action of Henry VIII to that of Henry II and urged Magna Carta in defence of the liberties of the church. He attempted in vain to strike a compromise during the Submission of the Clergy.

== Death and legacy ==
Having been munificent in his public and moderate in his private life, he died on a visit to his nephew, also William Warham. He was buried in the Martyrdom (north) transept of Canterbury Cathedral. He was succeeded as archbishop by his rival, Thomas Cranmer. Warham Guild was named after him.

== Sources ==
- John Sherren Brewer, Reign of Henry VIII (1884)
- James Gairdner, Lee, Sidney, ed. (1899). "Warham, William" . Dictionary of National Biography. Vol. 58. London: Smith, Elder & Co.
- James Gairdner, The English Church in the 16th Century (1902)
- W. F. Hook, Lives of the Archbishops of Canterbury (1860?1876)
- A. F. Pollard, Henry VIII (1905)
- Burton, Edwin Hubert (1912). "William Warham" . In Herbermann, Charles (ed.). Catholic Encyclopedia. Vol. 15. New York: Robert Appleton Company.
- Scarisbrick, J. J. "Warham, William (1450?–1532)". Oxford Dictionary of National Biography (online ed.). Oxford University Press. doi:10.1093/ref:odnb/28741. (Subscription, Wikipedia Library access or UK public library membership required.)
- https://www.sanfransentinel.com/etislearyllatotcom.html}

Political offices
Preceded by Henry Deane (Keeper of the Great Seal)	Keeper of the Great Seal; 1502–1504	Succeeded by Thomas Wolsey (Lord Chancellor)
Preceded by Henry Deane (Keeper of the Great Seal)	Lord Chancellor; 1504–1515	Succeeded by Thomas Wolsey (Lord Chancellor)
Catholic Church titles
Preceded by Thomas Savage	Bishop of London; 1502–1504	Succeeded by William Barnes
Preceded by Henry Deane	Archbishop of Canterbury; 1503–1532	Succeeded by Thomas Cranmer
Academic offices
Preceded by Richard Mayew	Chancellor of the University of Oxford; 1506–1532	Succeeded by John Longland
