= Thomas Chaundler =

English playwright and illustrator

Thomas Chaundler (1418–1490) was an English playwright and illustrator.

A manuscript at Trinity College, Cambridge, depicts Chaundler presenting one of his plays to the Bishop of Bath, Thomas Beckynton, in 1460.

== Life ==
He was born about 1418 in the parish of St. Cuthbert's, Wells. At the end of May 1430, he was admitted scholar of Winchester College, and on 1 May 1435 he was elected scholar of New College, Oxford. He became fellow on 1 May 1437, graduated B.A. and M.A., and in 1444 served the office of proctor. He was admitted B.D. on 8 February 1449-50, and on 18 November following was elected warden of Winchester College. On 9 March 1450 – 1451 he supplicated for the degree of B. Can. L., and on 15 July 1452 he was collated by his friend and fellow Wykehamist, Thomas Beckington, to the chancellorship of Wells Cathedral. On 22 February 1453 – 1454, Chaundler was elected Warden of New College; on 22 October following he supplicated for the degree of B.C.L., but 'vacat' is noted on the margin of the register, and on 3 March 1454-5, as warden of New College, he graduated D.D. On 6 July 1457, on the resignation of George Neville, Chaundler was elected Chancellor of Oxford University; he held the office until 15 May 1461, when Neville was again appointed, and from 1463 to 1467 Chaundler acted as vice-chancellor.

Outside the university, Chaundler held many ecclesiastical preferments. He was rector of Hardwick, Buckinghamshire, parson of Meonstoke, Hampshire, and prebendary of Bole in York Cathedral in 1466. On 25 February 1466-7, he was admitted chancellor of York, and in the same month he was granted a canonry and prebend in St. Stephen's, Westminster. Soon afterwards he became chaplain to Edward IV, and on 18 December 1467 was granted the rectory of All Hallows, London. He resigned this living in 1470, and on 15 August 1471 was collated to the prebend of Cadington Major in St. Paul's Cathedral. He gave up this prebend in 1472, and on 4 June was re-elected chancellor of Oxford University, George Neville having sided against Edward IV during Warwick's revolt. Chaundler held the chancellorship until 1479, serving during the same period on the commission of the peace for Oxford; he resigned the wardenship of New College in 1475. On 27 January 1475-6, he was collated to the prebend of Wildland in St. Paul's Cathedral, and in the following month he exchanged the prebend of Cadington Major for that of South Muskham in Southwell Church. On 23 March 1481-2, he was installed dean of Hereford; he resigned the prebend of South Muskham in 1485, the chancellorship of York in 1486, and the prebend of Wildland before 1489; but on 16 December 1486 he received the prebend of Gorwall and Overbury in Hereford Cathedral. He died on 2 November 1490, and was buried in Hereford Cathedral.

== Bibliography ==
- Collocutiones septem et allocutiones duae de laudibus Willelmi de Wykeham, Wintoniensis episcopi; c. 1460
- Liber apologeticus de omni statu humanae naturae (A defence of human nature in every state)

== Notes ==
Attribution

This article incorporates text from a publication now in the public domain: Pollard, Albert Frederick (1901). "Chaundler, Thomas". In Lee, Sidney (ed.). Dictionary of National Biography (1st supplement). London: Smith, Elder & Co.

Academic offices
Preceded by Nicholas Ossulbury	Warden of New College, Oxford; 1454–1475	Succeeded by Walter Hyll
Preceded by George Neville	Chancellor of the University of Oxford; 1457–1461	Succeeded by George Neville
Preceded by William Ive	Vice-Chancellor of the University of Oxford; 1463–1468	Succeeded by Thomas Stevyn, Thomas Jaune
Preceded by George Neville	Chancellor of the University of Oxford; 1472–1479	Succeeded by Lionel Woodville
