= Great Slump (15th century) =

Economic depression in 15th century England

The Great Slump was an economic depression that occurred in England from the 1430s to the 1480s.

== History ==
The Great Slump occurred in England between approximately 1440 and 1480. The economic decline began in the 1430s in Northern England, spreading south in the 1440s, with the economy not recovering until the 1480s. The Great Slump took place against a wider trading crisis in Northern Europe, driven by shortages of silver, essential for the money supply, and a breakdown in trade. Some accounts refer to the event as a "credit crunch".

Some scholars blamed the slump on the effects of the Hundred Years' War and the economic blockades suffered by England due to its predations in France and its wars with Spain and the Hanseatic League. It was also said to be driven by harvest failures in the 1430s and disease amongst livestock, that drove up the price of food and damaged the wider economy. Starting in 1368 China's Ming Dynasty reversion to silver currency from the fiat currency of the Mongol Yuan Dynasty created substantial demand for the metal for the entirety of their reign.

The Great Slump was far-reaching in England. Certain groups were particularly badly affected: cloth exports fell by 35 per cent in four years at the end of the 1440s, for example, collapsing by up to 90 per cent in some parts of the south-west. Prices of remaining trade goods fell dramatically as well. Popular rebellions ensued in 1450 under Jack Cade, and the events contributed to the outbreak of the Wars of the Roses in the 1460s. English merchants tried to survive through the formation of merchant networks, which enabled them to organize into large conglomerates. This allowed access to bullion and well-guarded credit.

== See also ==
- Great Bullion Famine
- Economy of England in the Middle Ages
- John and William Merfold
- Hundred Years' War

== Bibliography ==
- Craig, John (1953). The Mint: A History of the London Mint from A.D. 287 to 1948. Cambridge, England: Cambridge University Press. pp. 85–96. ASIN B0000CIHG7.
- Davies, Glyn (1997) [1994]. A History of Money: From Ancient Times to the Present Day (Reprint ed.). Cardiff: University of Wales Press. pp. 168–174. ISBN 978-0708313510.
- Hatcher, John (2002). "The Great Slump of the Mid-Fifteenth Century". In Britnell, Richard; Hatcher, John (eds.). Progress and Problems in Medieval England: Essays in Honour of Edward Miller. Cambridge, UK: Cambridge University Press. ISBN 978-0-521-52273-1.
- Hicks, Michael (2012). The Wars of the Roses. New Haven and London: Yale University Press. ISBN 978-0-300-18157-9.
