= Thomas Drax =

Thomas Drax was an Oxford college head in the 16th century.

He was Rector of Lincoln College, Oxford, from 1503 to 1518; and Vice-Chancellor of the University of Oxford from 1511 to 1512. He was also a Canon of Lichfield Cathedral.
