= Hugh Saunders (academic) =

English clergyman and academic

Hugh Saunders DD (died 1537), otherwise Hugh Shakespeeres or Breakspeare, was an English clergyman and academic, Principal of St Alban Hall, Oxford, 1501–1503, and Vice-chancellor of the University of Oxford in 1501 and 1502.

A pluralist, Saunders was vicar of St Nicholas Church, Deptford in 1502–1503, and of Hoo St Werburgh in 1503, and he resigned from Meopham in 1504. In 1509 he became a canon of St Paul's, in 1513 Rector of St Mary's, Whitechapel, and in 1516 of Gestingthorpe, Essex, as well as Rector of Mixbury; his will was proved on 26 February 1538.
