= John Coldale =

16th-century English politician

John Coldale or Cowdale (by 1495 – 1534 or later), of Carlisle, Cumberland, was an English politician.

He was a member (MP) of the parliament of England for Carlisle in 1529.
