= Lawrence Stubbs =

Oxford college head

Lawrence Stubbs, D.D. was an Oxford college head in the 16th-century.

Stubbs was Vice-Chancellor of the University of Oxford from 1514 to 1516, and President of Magdalen College, Oxford, from 1525 to 1527. A priest, he was also Rector of Fobbing and a Canon of York Minster.
