= The Encyclopaedia of Oxford =

1988 history book

The Encyclopaedia of Oxford is an encyclopaedia covering the history of Oxford in England.

The book was published by Macmillan in 1988 (ISBN 0-333-39917-X, 978-0-333-39917-0). It was edited by the Oxford-educated historian Christopher Hibbert with the help of the associate editor, his brother Edward Hibbert.

The encyclopaedia was published in hardback and then a paperback version (Papermac, reissued in 1992, ISBN 0-333-48614-5), but only one edition was produced and copies are now sought, typically selling for more than the original selling price of £25 for the hardback edition, even in paperback form.

The book mainly consists of detailed historical entries in alphabetical order. Many entries concern architecture and buildings, and the University of Oxford and its colleges. Appendices include lists of notable people who have held important offices associated with Oxford, especially the university, in date order.

== See also ==
- The London Encyclopaedia, also edited by Christopher Hibbert
