= List of masters of Balliol College, Oxford =

Balliol College, Oxford, one of the constituent colleges of the University of Oxford, is governed by the Master and Fellows of the college. The Master, when elected, must be "the person who is, in their [the Fellows'] judgement, most fit for the government of the College as a place of religion, learning, and education". Although the rules in no way suggest a preference for an alumnus/alumna or Fellow of the college to be chosen, there have been few who were not: only one Master in the 20th century had no previous connection with the college (David Lindsay Keir 1946-1964) and the previous non-member to hold the post before that was Theophilus Leigh, elected in 1726. However, the current Master of Balliol, Helen Ghosh, studied at St Hugh's and Hertford colleges.

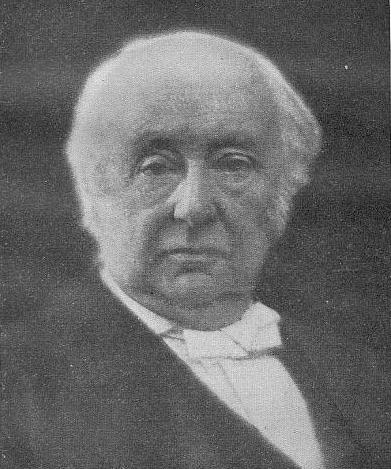
Benjamin Jowett

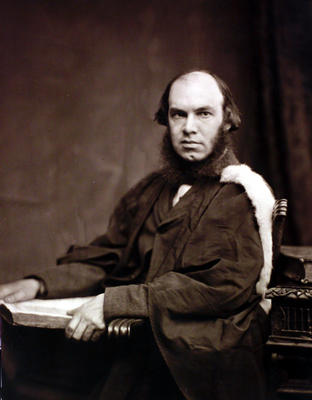
Edward Caird

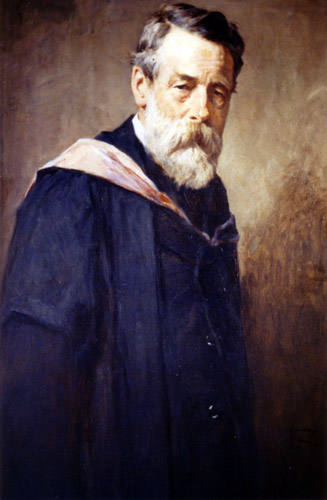
James Leigh Strachan Davidson

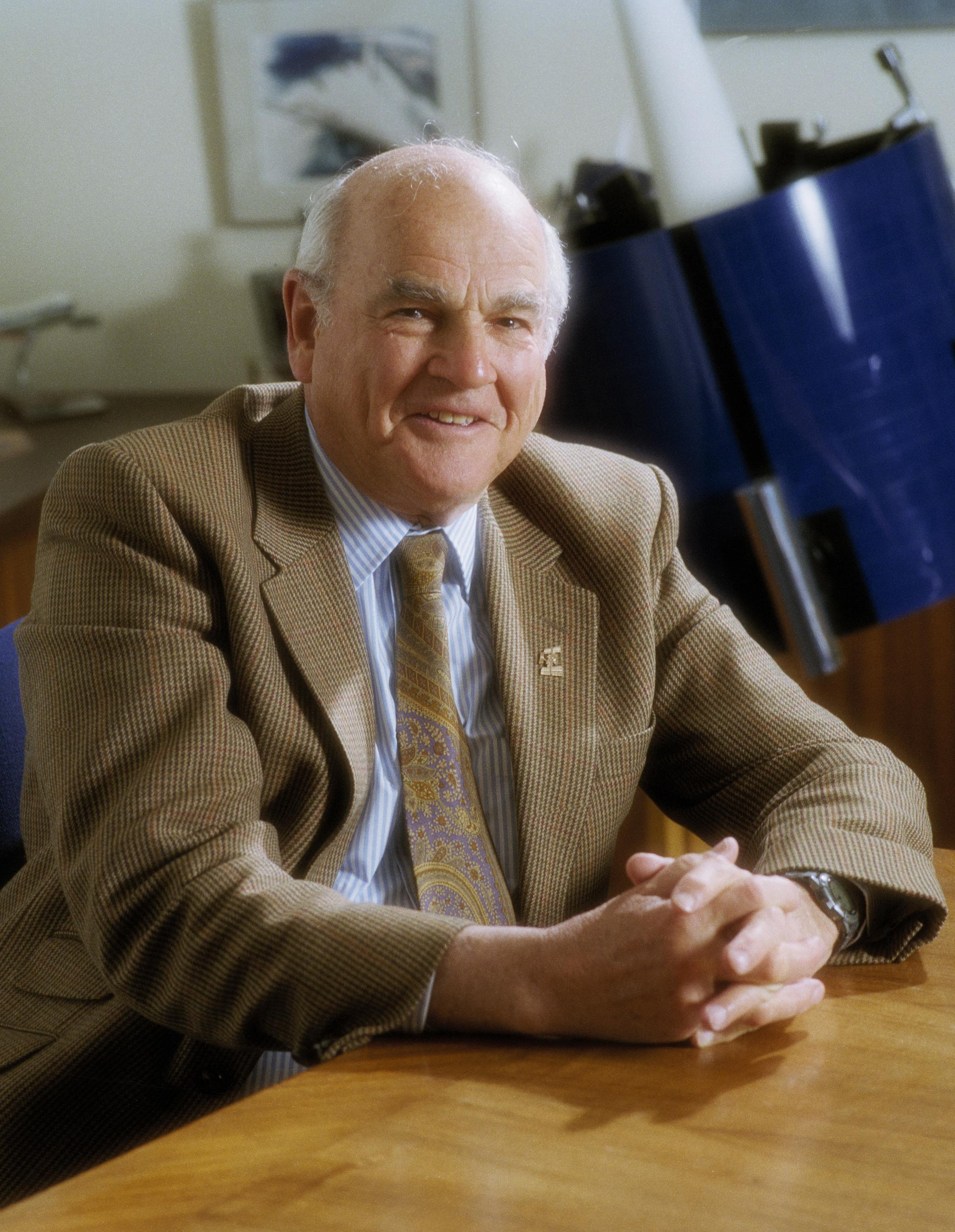
Baruch Samuel Blumberg

List of masters of Balliol
Name	Date	Details
Walter de Fodringeye	1282	
Hugh de Warkenby	1296	
Stephen de Cornubia	1303	
Richard de Chickwell	1309	
Thomas de Waldeby	1321	
Henry de Seton	1323	
Nicholas de Luceby	1327	
John Poclynton	1332	
Hugh Corbrygge	1340	
Robert de Derby	1356	
John Wycliffe	1360	
John Hugate	1366	
Thomas Tyrwhit	1371	
Hamond Haskman	1397	
William Lambert	1406	
Thomas Chase	1412	
Robert Burley	1428	
Richard Stapilton	1429	
William Brandon	1429	
Robert Twaytes	1450	
William Lambton	1461	
John Segden	1472	
Robert Abdy	1477	
William Bell	1496	
Richard Barningham	1504	
Thomas Cisson	1511	
Richard Stubbys	1518	
William White	1525	
George Coote	1539	
William Wright	1545	
James Brooks	1547	Bishop of Gloucester (1554–1558)
William Wright	1555	
Francis Babington	1559	
Antony Garnet	1560	
Robert Hooper	1563	
John Piers	1570	
Adam Squier	1571	
Edmund Lilly	1580	
Robert Abbots	1609	Later Bishop of Salisbury
John Parkhurst	1616	
Thomas Laurence	1637	
George Bradshaw	1646	
Henry Savage	1650	
Thomas Good	1672	
John Venn	1678	
Roger Mander	1687	
John Baron	1704	
Joseph Hunt	1721	
Theophilus Leigh	1726	Longest incumbent in office
John Davey	1785	
John Parsons	1798	Bishop of Peterborough from 1813
Richard Jenkyns	1819	
Robert Scott	1854	Dean Ireland's Professor of the Exegesis of Holy Scripture at Oxford (1861 to 1870); Dean of Rochester (1870 to 1887)
Benjamin Jowett	1870	
Edward Caird	1893–1907	Snell Exhibitioner 1860; Professor of Moral Philosophy at the University of Glasgow 1866; First lay Master.
James Leigh Strachan Davidson	1907–16	
Arthur Lionel Smith	1916–24	
Alexander Dunlop Lindsay	1924–49	Vice-Chancellor in 1935. Founder of the University of Keele
David Lindsay Keir	1949–65	Fellow of University Coll. 1921; Vice-Chancellor, Queen's University Belfast 1939.
Christopher Hill	1965–78	
Sir Anthony Kenny	1978–89	
Baruch Blumberg	1989–94	George Eastman Visiting Professor 1983; Co-recipient of Nobel Prize in Physiology or Medicine.
Colin Lucas	1994–2001	Vice-Chancellor (1997–2004)
Andrew Graham	1997–2001 (acting); 2001–2011	
Drummond Bone	2011–18	Byron Scholar, Snell Exhibitioner 1968; Principal of Royal Holloway, University of London (2000 to 2002); Vice-Chancellor of the University of Liverpool (2002 to 2008)
Helen Ghosh	April 2018 - July 2026	
Seamus Perry	From July 2026	
