= Robsart =

Robsart can refer to:

== People ==
- Amy Robsart (1532-1560), also known as Lady Amy Dudley, wife of Lord Robert Dudley, tragic heroine of Walter Scott's fictionalized novel Kenilworth (1821)

== Places ==
- Robsart, Saskatchewan, a village in the Canadian province of Saskatchewan, named after Amy Robsart
- Robsart, New Mexico, a ghost town in Lincoln County, New Mexico
