= Joseph Hunt =

Joseph Hunt may refer to:

- Joseph Hunt (priest), English Anglican priest and master of Balliol College, Oxford
- Joseph Hunt (MP) (1762-1816) senior employee of the Admiralty forced to resign as an MP
- Joseph J. Hunt, American labor union leader
- J. McVicker Hunt, American educational psychologist and author
- Joe Hunt (1919–1945), American tennis player and naval aviator
- Jody Hunt (born 1961), American lawyer and U.S. Department of Justice official
- Joseph Hunt (engineer) (born 1956), American engineer, NASA mission manager and flight director
- Joey Hunt, American football center

== See also ==
- Billionaire Boys Club, an investing and social club founded by Joseph Henry Hunt
