= Antony Garnet =

Antony Garnet was an English academic during the 16th-century: he graduated B.A. from Balliol College, Oxford in 1547 and M.A. in 1551; and was Master of Balliol from 1560 to 1563.

In 1557, when he was still a Fellow of Balliol College, he donated a silver spoon to the college's chapel.

Academic offices
Preceded by Francis Babington	Master of Balliol College, Oxford; 1560–1563	Succeeded by Robert Hooper
