= George Bradshaw (master) =

George Bradshaw was an English academic.

Bagshaw graduated B.A. from Balliol College, Oxford in 1630 and M.A. in 1635, in which year he became a Fellow. He was Master of Balliol from 1646 to 1651.

== Notes ==
Academic offices
Preceded by Thomas Laurence	Master of Balliol College, Oxford; 1546–1545	Succeeded by Henry Savage
