= Walter Hodges =

Walter Hodges may refer to:

- C. Walter Hodges (1909–2004), English illustrator and author
- Walter Hodges (academic) (died 1757), English academic administrator at the University of Oxford
