= John Parkhurst (master) =

English academic and priest (1563–1639)

John Parkhurst (1563-1639) was an English academic during the late 16th and early 17th centuries.

Parkhurst entered Magdalen College, Oxford in 1580. He graduated B.A. in 1584. He was a Fellow of Magdalen from 1588 to 1603. A priest, he held livings at Shillingford, Newington and Little Wakering.He was Master of Balliol from 1617 to 1637.

== Notes ==
Academic offices
Preceded by Robert Abbot (bishop)	Master of Balliol College, Oxford; 1617–1637	Succeeded by Thomas Laurence
