= Thomas Cisson =

English academic

Thomas Cisson was an English academic during the 16th-century:

Cisson graduated BD at Balliol College, Oxford; and was Master of Balliol from 1512 to 1518.

== Notes ==
Academic offices
Preceded by Richard Barningham	Master of Balliol College, Oxford; 1512–1518	Succeeded by Richard Stubbys
