= John Venn (disambiguation) =

John Venn (1834–1923) was an English logician and mathematician.

John Venn may also refer to:

- John Venn (academic) (died 1687), English academic administrator
- John Venn (politician) (1586–1650), English politician
- John Venn (priest) (1759–1813), one of the founders of the Church Missionary Society, son of Henry Venn
- John Archibald Venn (1883–1958), British economist
