= George Bradshaw (disambiguation) =

George Bradshaw (1801–1853) was an English cartographer, printer and publisher.

George Bradshaw may also refer to:

- George Bradshaw (footballer) (1904–1951), English footballer for Blackpool, Bury and Tranmere Rovers
- George Bradshaw (footballer, born 1913), English footballer for Bury, New Brighton, Doncaster Rovers, Everton and Oldham Athletic
- George Bradshaw (writer) (1909–1973), American journalist
- George Bradshaw (baseball) (1924–1994), American baseball player
- George Bradshaw (master), English academic, master of Balliol College, Oxford
