= John Piers =

Archbishop of York from 1589 to 1594

The Most Reverend John Piers
- Archbishop of York
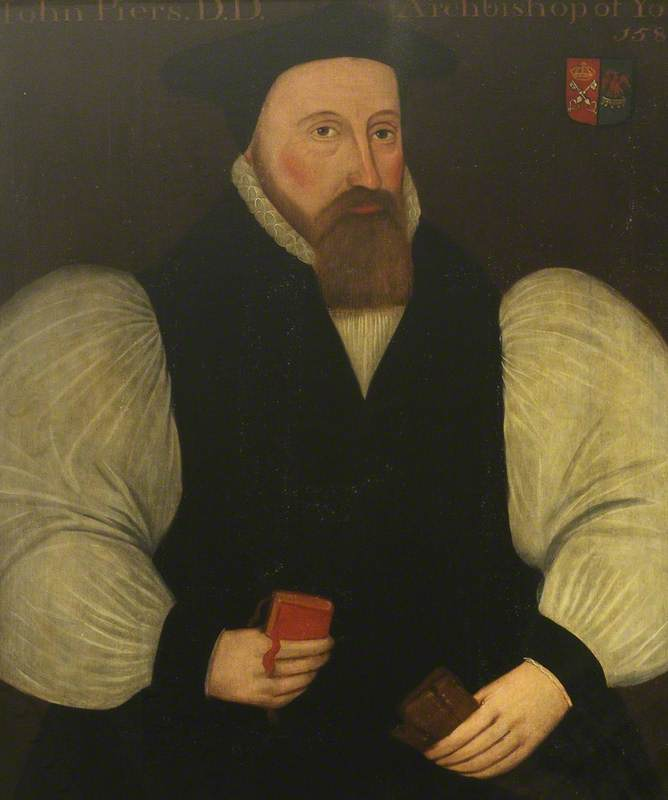
- Installed: 1589
- Term ended: 1594
- Predecessor: Edwin Sandys
- Successor: Matthew Hutton

Orders
- Consecration: 15 April 1576 by Edmund Grindal

Personal details
- Born: 1522/23 South Hinksey
- Died: 1594 Bishopthorpe
- Buried: York Minster
- Denomination: Church of England

John Piers (Peirse) (1522/3 – 1594) was Archbishop of York between 1589 and 1594. Previous to that he had been Bishop of Rochester and Bishop of Salisbury.

== Life ==
He was born at South Hinksey, near Oxford, and was educated at Magdalen College School. He became a demy of Magdalen College in 1542, and graduated B.A. in 1545, M.A. 1549, B.D. 1558, and D.D. 1565–6. He was elected probationer-fellow of Magdalen in 1545, and full fellow in 1546. In the following year he became a senior student of Christ Church, Oxford, on the condition of returning to his old college if at the end of twelve months he desired to do so. This he did, and was re-elected fellow in 1548–9.

He took holy orders, and in 1558 was instituted to the rectory of Quainton, Buckinghamshire. There, according to Anthony à Wood, he fell into the habit of drinking in alehouses, he was weaned of the habit by a clerical friend. He was rector of Langdon in Essex from 1567 to 1573. On his return he took a leading place in the university, and his course of promotion was steady and rapid. In 1570 he was elected Master of Balliol College, holding also the college living of Fillingham in Lincolnshire.

In 1567 he was appointed to the deanery of Chester, to which, in May 1571, he added that of Salisbury. At Salisbury, by command of the Queen, he brought the ritual and statutes of his cathedral into conformity with the spirit of the Reformation, with changes away from Catholic practice. In the same year (1571) he received from the crown the deanery of Christ Church, Oxford, with licence to hold his other deaneries and livings in commendam. Chester he resigned in 1573, and Salisbury in 1578. On the elevation of Edmund Freake to Norwich he was elected bishop of Rochester, and was consecrated 15 April 1576. He held the bishopric of Rochester little more than a year, being translated to Salisbury on Edmund Gheast's death in November 1577.

Elizabeth made him in 1576 lord high almoner In this capacity he had a dispute with the George Talbot, 6th Earl of Shrewsbury respecting deodands, which was settled amicably. In January 1583 he was employed by Elizabeth to signify to Grindal that he should resign his archbishopric on account of failing health and increasing blindness. The archbishop's death in July of that year put an end to the negotiation. In 1585 he was consulted by Elizabeth whether she could legitimately assist the Low Countries in their struggle with Philip II of Spain, and gave a long affirmative reply. In 1585, again, he was one of the prelates before whom Edward Gellibrand, fellow of Magdalen, was cited as being the ringleader of the Presbyterian party in Oxford.

Two years later Robert Dudley, 1st Earl of Leicester made an ineffectual attempt to obtain his translation to Durham. On the defeat of the Spanish Armada, he was appointed by Elizabeth to preach at the thanksgiving service at St. Paul's Cathedral on 24 November 1588.

His translation to the archbishopric of York was as Sandys's successor in 1589. His tenure of the primacy was short. He died at Bishopthorpe on 28 September 1594, aged 71. He was unmarried. He was buried at the east end of York Minster, with a long epitaph.

Church of England titles
Preceded by Edmund Freke	Bishop of Rochester; 1576–1578	Succeeded by John Young
Preceded by Edmund Gheast	Bishop of Salisbury; 1577–1589	Succeeded by John Coldwell
Preceded by Edwin Sandys	Archbishop of York; 1589–1594	Succeeded by Matthew Hutton
Academic offices
Preceded by Robert Hooper	Master of Balliol College, Oxford; 1570	Succeeded by Adam Squier
