= Thomas Warmestry =

Thomas Warmestry (1610 – 30 October 1665) was Dean of Worcester from 1661 until his death.

== Biography ==
Warmestry was born in Worcester in 1610, the son of William Warmestry and younger brother of the poet Gervase Warmestry, into an ancient Worcester family. Gervase succeeded William as registrar of the Diocese of Worcester, a post which had been in the Warmestry family since 1544.

Thomas Warmestry was educated at the King's School, Worcester and at Oxford (matriculated at Christ Church in 1628 aged 18, and graduated BA at Brasenose College in 1628, MA at Christ Church in 1631, DD 1642).

On 13 April 1635 he was instituted rector of Whitchurch, Warwickshire, and he was clerk for the diocese of Worcester in both convocations of the clergy held in 1640. His speech to Convocation in November 1640 expressed reservations regarding the new Laudian canons and church imagery: he declared that worship should be "directed to the right object; not to altars, not to images, but to God". Warmestry was a moderate Anglican, who desired that Anglican episcopal government "may be fatherly, not despotical, much less tyrannical".

In 1646 he was appointed by the city of Worcester to treat with the parliamentary army respecting the city's surrender. Afterwards he joined King Charles I at Oxford, when he was deprived of his church preferment. Later he removed to London, where he acted as almoner and confessor to royalist sufferers. In May 1653 he compounded for his lands at Paxford in the parish of Blockley in Worcestershire, and the sequestration was removed. In September of the same year he, with Thomas Good, met and conferred with Richard Baxter at Cleobury Mortimer in Shropshire as to the advisability of the clergy of Shropshire joining the Worcestershire association; Warmestry professed his ‘very good liking’ of the design, and signed a paper to that effect on 20 September 1653. He does not, however, seem to have had any real sympathy with Baxter, who complained that after he was silenced Warmestry, when dean of Worcester, went purposely to Baxter's ‘flock’ and preached ‘vehement, tedious invectives.’ He held for a time the post of lecturer at St Margaret's, Westminster, for his removal from which the parliament petitioned Oliver Cromwell, on 23 June 1657, on account of his delinquency.

While residing in Chelsea, at the house of Lady Laurence, Warmestry was involved in the conversion to Christianity of Rigep Dandulo, a Muslim from Chios. Dandulo was baptised by Peter Gunning in 1657. Warmestry's account of the conversion, The Baptized Turk (1658), includes a description and analysis of a dream experienced by Dandulo.

At the Restoration Warmestry petitioned, in view of his losses during the Civil War and his loyalty to the royalist cause, to be appointed Master of the Savoy, a position to which Gilbert Sheldon was instead appointed. However, he did gain the following livings:

- Canon of Gloucester Cathedral (1660)
- Dean of Worcester (1661)
- Vicar of Bromsgrove, Worcestershire (1662)

As Dean of Worcester, Warmestry experienced difficulties regarding the installation of the great organ in the cathedral. After he complained about organ-builder William Hathaway's workmanship in May 1665, on 5 August Robert Skinner (Bishop of Worcester) wrote to Gilbert Sheldon (Archbishop of Canterbury) that Hathaway and consultant Christopher Gibbons were taking advantage of the Dean's "utter ignorance in re musica": the Dean was "ὄνος πρὸς λύραν [an ass to the lyre], had no more skill in an organ than a beast that hath no understanding."

He died on 30 October 1665, and was buried in Worcester Cathedral.

== Published works ==
He published:

- Suspiria Ecclesiæ et Reipublicæ Anglicanæ, London, 1640.
- A Convocation Speech against Images, Altars, Crosses, the New Canons, the Oaths, London, 1641.
- Pax Vobis; or a Charme for Tumultuous Spirits, London, 1641.
- Ramus Olivæ; or an Humble Motion for Peace, Oxford, 1642, 1644.
- An Answer to certain Observations of W. Brydges concerning the Present Warre against his Majestie, n.p. 1643.
- The Preparation for London, London, 1648.
- The Vindication of the Solemnity of the Nativity of Christ, n.p. 1648.
- The Baptised Turk, London, 1658.
- The Countermine of Union: a short Platform of Expedients for Peace, London, 1660.
- An Humble Monitory to the Most Glorious Majesty of Charles II (including verses extant in Addit. MS. 23116), London, 1661.
- A Box of Spicnard; or a Little Manuel of Sacramental Instruction and Devotion, London, 1664.

Church of England titles
Preceded by John Oliver	Dean of Worcester; 1661–1665	Succeeded by William Thomas
