= John Davey (master) =

John Davey, D.D. (11 May 1732 – 5 October 1798) was Master of Balliol College, Oxford, from 1785 until his death.

Davey graduated B.A. from Balliol in 1753; M.A. in 1757; and B.D. in 1784. His first act as Master was to bring in as Fellow John Parsons from Wadham College. The college finances were improved by the development of the Long Benton Colliery.
