= Robert Hooper (master) =

Robert Hooper (1563-1639) was an English academic during the 16th-century.

Hooper graduated B.A. from Balliol College, Oxford in 1558 and M.A. in 156o.. He was a Fellow of Magdalen from 1588 to 1603. A priest, he held the living at Fugglestone St Peter. He was Master of Balliol from 1563 to 1570.

== Notes ==
Academic offices
Preceded by Antony Garnet	Master of Balliol College, Oxford; 1563–1570	Succeeded by John Piers
