= William Good (Jesuit) =

William Good, S.J. (1527 – 5 July 1586) was an English Jesuit and educator in Ireland.

== Life ==
Born at Glastonbury, Somerset, he was educated there, and admitted to Corpus Christi College, Oxford, 26 February 1546. He was elected a fellow there on 15 June 1548, and commenced M.A. 18 July 1552, being around then humanity reader in the college. He was one of the clerks of the market in 1552.

In Queen Mary's reign he obtained the benefice of Middle Chinnock, Somerset, the prebend of Comba Octava in the church of Wells, and the head-mastership of the grammar school at Wells. Soon after the accession of Elizabeth he left for Tournai, where in 1562 he was admitted into the Society of Jesus by Everard Mercurian. After he had passed his novitiate he was sent into Ireland with Richard Creagh as a missionary for several years and there taught at a Jesuit school at Limerick. Then he went to Leuven, where he became acquainted with Robert Parsons, whom he persuaded to join the Jesuit order. In 1577 he was professed of the four vows at Rome.

Subsequently, he visited Sweden and Poland in company with Antonio Possevino in order to settle some affairs relating to the order. While living in Poland, he was elected by the provincial meeting as procurator to the fourth general congregation and took part in the election of Claudio Acquaviva as general of the Jesuits (1581). After the congregation was over he remained as confessor to the English College, Rome. Good died at Naples on 5 July (N. S.) 1586, and was buried in the college of the Jesuits in that city.

His Ecclesiae Anglicanae Trophea, sive sanctorum Martyrum, Rome, 1584, contained thirty-six plates, engraved on copper. They reproduced pictures that formerly covered the walls of the church attached to the English College at Rome, and presented by George Gilbert, S.J. Good had superintended the work and supplied the artist with the subjects. A reproduction of the engravings, under the editorial supervision of John Morris, S.J., appeared in 1888.
