= William White (master) =

English academic

William White, D.D. (fl. 1505-1539) was an English academic during the 16th-century. White graduated MA from Balliol College, Oxford in 1505; BCL in 1515; and BD in 1517. A priest, he was Vicar of St Lawrence Jewry in the City of London from 1517. White was Master of Balliol from 1525 to 1539, when he probably resigned under duress. His will was proved in 1547.

== Notes ==
Academic offices
Preceded by Richard Stubbys	Master of Balliol College, Oxford; 1525–1529	Succeeded by George Cotes
