= Rigep Dandulo =

17th-century Turkish convert to Christianity in England

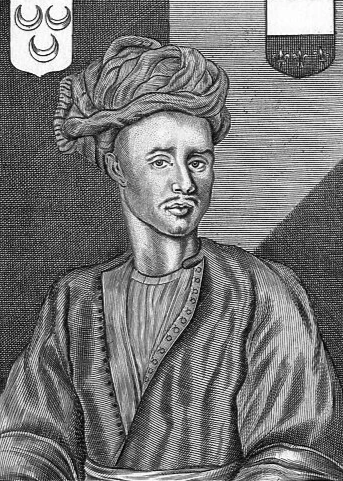
- 17th-century engraving of Rigep Dandulo by Thomas Cross
- Born: 1633; İzmir, Anatolia Eyalet, Ottoman Empire
- Died: fl. 1661; London ?

Rigep Dandulo (1633 – fl. 1661), also known as Recep Dandulo (Ottoman Turkish: رجب داندولو) and Philip Dandulo, was a Turkish convert to Christianity of Venetian patrician and Greek origins. After a visit to England, he ended up converting to Christianity. Dandulo remained in England until his death.

== Early life ==
Dandulo was born in İzmir in 1633 to a Greek Orthodox mother and a Muslim father, who was a silk merchant in Chios. As a relative of figures such as Enrico Dandolo and Andrea Doria, Dandulo hailed from the prestigious House of Dandolo. To elaborate on Dandulo's link to the Dandolo lineage, Thomas Warmestry posited that segments of the family had relocated from Italy to the Ottoman-ruled Greek island of Kea during the Ottoman–Venetian wars, his family's place of residence for centuries.

Dandulo was kidnapped by Moorish pirates and taken to Egypt when he was six years old. He would escape years later and come across an agent of the Levant Company in Algiers who talked to him about his native country of England. Dandulo, intrigued, wanted to see the 'strange country' for himself.

== Arrival in England ==
Dandulo arrived in London in May 1657 as part of a diplomatic mission for bolstering business and trade between England and the Ottoman city of Algiers. He stayed at the home (Chelsea Manor) of Lady Lawrence, having met her traveling son in İzmir. This Lady Lawrence may have been Grissell Lawrence (d. 1675), widow of prominent merchant Sir John Lawrence (d. 1638). Lady Lawrence's Turkish son-in-law, Isaac Lawrence, convinced Dandulo to stay in England so that he could help him on business matters.

Warmestry, who was also a member of the Lawrence household, was prompted by Lady Lawrence to encourage Dandulo's conversion from Islam to Christianity. He would do this with the help of Peter Gunning, a Westminster divine named Reverend Thirsecross, and Mr. Samois, a Turkish translator. They were ultimately successful in their goal.

== Baptism ==
Dandulo was publicly baptised as an Anglican on 8 November 1657 by Gunning at a chapel within Exeter House, a mansion in London owned by Lord Burghley. He was given the Christian name of Philip. Warmestry's account of the conversion, The Baptized Turk (1658), includes a description and analysis of a dream experienced by Dandulo, which was the direct inspiration of conversion for him.

== Later life ==
Not much is known about Dandulo's life after his conversion. He moved to Holborn shortly after his conversion, where he would stay in a certain Lady Hatter's residence. He would then move to Westminster with his wife and children. Dandulo would continue living as a Christian and died in England.
