= Thomas Good =

English academic and clergyman

Thomas Good (a.k.a. Thomas Goode, 1609 – 9 April 1678) was an English academic and clergyman, and Master of Balliol College, Oxford. He is known as a moderate in and orthodox apologist for the Church of England, engaging with Richard Baxter and urging him to clarify a 'middle way'.

== Life ==
Originally from the Tenbury Wells area of Worcestershire, England, Good was educated at the King's School, Worcester in the time of Henry Bright.

He was admitted scholar at Balliol College in 1624, and took the degree of B.A. in 1628. Next year he was elected probationer-fellow, and in 1630 fellow of his college. He proceeded M.A. in 1631, and B.D. in 1639. He became vicar of St Alkmund's in Shrewsbury, probably in 1642. From this living, he was then ejected; but he continued to hold the rectory of Coreley in Shropshire, to which he had been instituted before 1647, throughout the Interregnum, and he submitted to the parliamentary visitors for Oxford, being appointed one of the visitors' delegates on 30 September 1647.

With Thomas Warmestry, he met Richard Baxter and other ministers of the Worcestershire Association in September 1653 at Cleobury Mortimer, to discuss the question of the Shropshire clergy joining the association; he signed a paper expressing approval of the articles of agreement. He obtained leave of absence from Balliol College for a large part of the period from 1647 to 1658, and then resigned his fellowship. At the Restoration he was created doctor of divinity as a sufferer for the King's cause. He was also appointed prebendary of Hereford on 29 August 1660, and about the same time he was presented to the rectory of Wistanstow in Herefordshire. In 1672 he was unanimously elected Master of Balliol College. He died at Hereford 9 April 1678 and was buried in Hereford Cathedral.

== Works ==
His published works were:

- Firmianus and Dubitantius, certain dialogues concerning Atheism, Infidelity, Popery, and other Heresies and Schismes that trouble the peace of the Church and are destructive of primitive piety, Oxford, 1674. Reflections on the nonconformists contained in this work moved Baxter to write the author a letter of protest, which is printed in Reliquiae Baxterianae, pt. iii. pp. 148–51.
- An appeal for the endowment of fellowships in Balliol College.
- A Brief English Tract of Logick, 1677.

== Sources ==
- This article incorporates text from a publication now in the public domain: "Good, Thomas". Dictionary of National Biography. London: Smith, Elder & Co. 1885–1900.

Academic offices
Preceded by Henry Savage	Master of Balliol College, Oxford; 1672–1678	Succeeded by John Venn
