= Richard Stubbys =

Richard Stubbys, D.D. was an English academic during the 16th-century.

Stubbys graduated MA from Balliol College, Oxford in 1509; and BD in 1516. A priest, he was Rector of All Hallows Honey Lane in the City of London from 1517. White was Master of Balliol from 1519 to 1525.

== Notes ==
Academic offices
Preceded by Thomas Cisson	Master of Balliol College, Oxford; 1518–1525	Succeeded by William White
