= Theophilus Leigh =

The Revd Theophilus Leigh, D.D. (1691 – 3 January 1785) was an 18th-century Oxford academic of aristocratic descent.

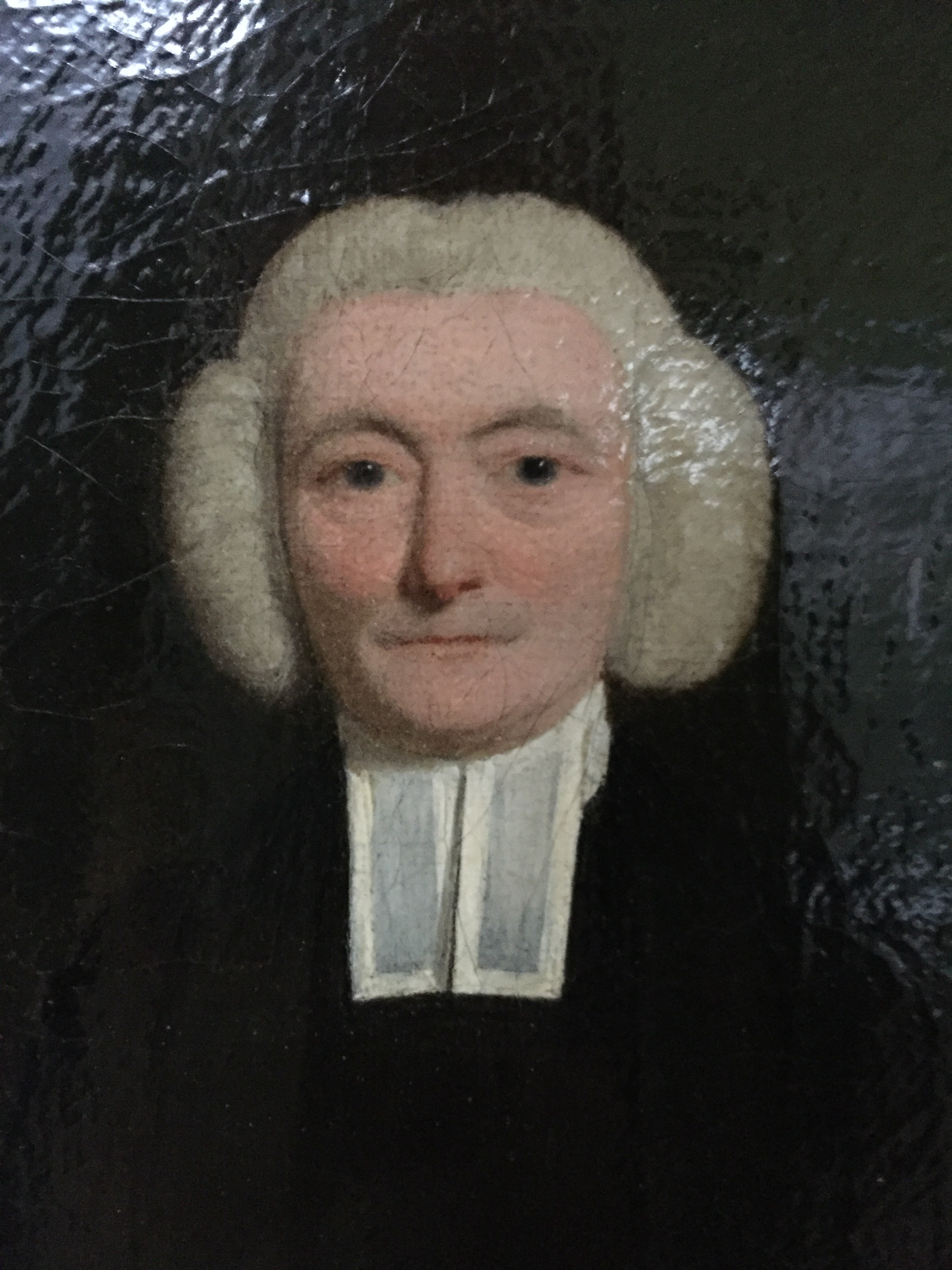
The Revd Theophilus Leigh

== Life ==
Elected Master of Balliol College, Oxford on 12 May 1726, through the influence of his uncle, Lord Chandos, Dr Leigh remained in post until his death in 1785, the longest incumbent in office. Appointed Rector of Broadwell, Gloucestershire in 1718, Leigh served as Vice-Chancellor of Oxford University from 1738 until 1741.

A relative of the Barons Leigh and great-uncle of Jane Austen, he married Anne Bee (died 1766), only daughter of Edward Bee, of Beckley Park, Oxfordshire; they had two daughters, Mary (who married, her first cousin, Rev Thomas Leigh BCL) and Cassandra (who married Rev Samuel Cooke).

== See also ==
- Balliol College
- Leigh baronets

Academic offices
Preceded by Joseph Hunt	Master of Balliol College, Oxford; 1726–1785	Succeeded by John Davey
Preceded by Stephen Niblett	Vice-Chancellor of Oxford University; 1738–1741	Succeeded by Walter Hodges
