= George Gilbert (Jesuit) =

George Gilbert (1559?–1583) was an English Roman Catholic convert and activist, a founder of the Catholic Association in England, and on his deathbed admitted to the Society of Jesus.

== Life ==
Gilbert was born in Suffolk around 1559, and at an early age succeeded on his father's death to extensive landed estates. While travelling on the continent, he was converted to Catholicism by Robert Parsons at Rome in 1579. Upon his return to London, he, in conjunction with Thomas Pounde of Belmont, formed a Catholic Association, consisting of unmarried young men of birth and property. They promised to live on the bare necessities of their state, and to give all of their incomes for the good of the Catholic cause. The association was blessed by Pope Gregory XIII on 14 April 1580.

Members lodged together in the house of Norris, the chief pursuivant, in Fetter Lane or Chancery Lane, London. Norris was influenced by John Aylmer, bishop of London, and was generously paid by Gilbert. At Fulham, the bishop's son-in-law, Dr. Adam Squire, was in Gilbert's pay. Through the connivance of these men, the members of the association were able to receive priests and to have masses celebrated daily in their house until, after the arrival of the Jesuits Parsons and Edmund Campion in England, persecution of Catholics grew more severe.

In 1581, Gilbert deemed it prudent to withdraw to the English College at Reims, where he was welcomed by William Allen. He then entered the English College, Rome, as a pensioner. While preparing to go to France on a papal mission, Gilbert contracted a fever and died on 6 October 1583. Gilbert had seen to the covering of the walls of the English College at Rome with frescoes of the English martyrs. He left the superintendence of this work to William Good, who had the pictures engraved and published, under the title of Ecclesiae Anglicanae Trophaea, Rome, 1584.
