= William Wright (master) =

16th century English Academic

William Wright was an English academic during the 16th-century; he graduated B.A. from Balliol College, Oxford in 1523 and M.A. in 1528; and was Master of Balliol from 1555 to 1559.

== Notes ==
Academic offices
Preceded by James Brooks	Master of Balliol College, Oxford; 1555–1559	Succeeded by Francis Babington
