= William Clarke Wontner =

English painter

- Born: 17 January 1857; Stockwell, Surrey, England
- Died: 23 September 1930 (aged 73); Worcester, England
- Resting place: Ripple, Worcestershire
- Education: William Hoff Wontner (father)
- Known for: Painter
- Movement: Orientalist; Neoclassicism; Academic Classicism
- Spouse: Jessie Marguerite Keene (1872–1950)

William Clarke Wontner (17 January 1857 – 23 September 1930) was an English portrait painter steeped in Academic Classicism and Romanticism.

== Life and career ==
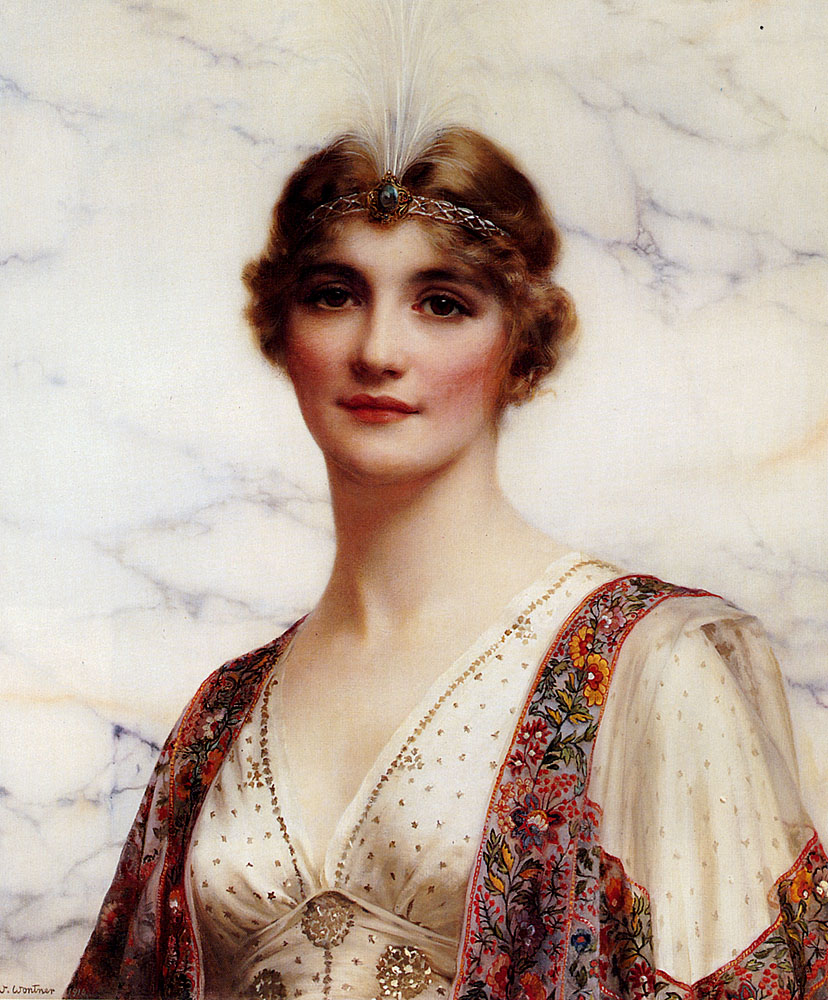
The Fair Persian (1916)

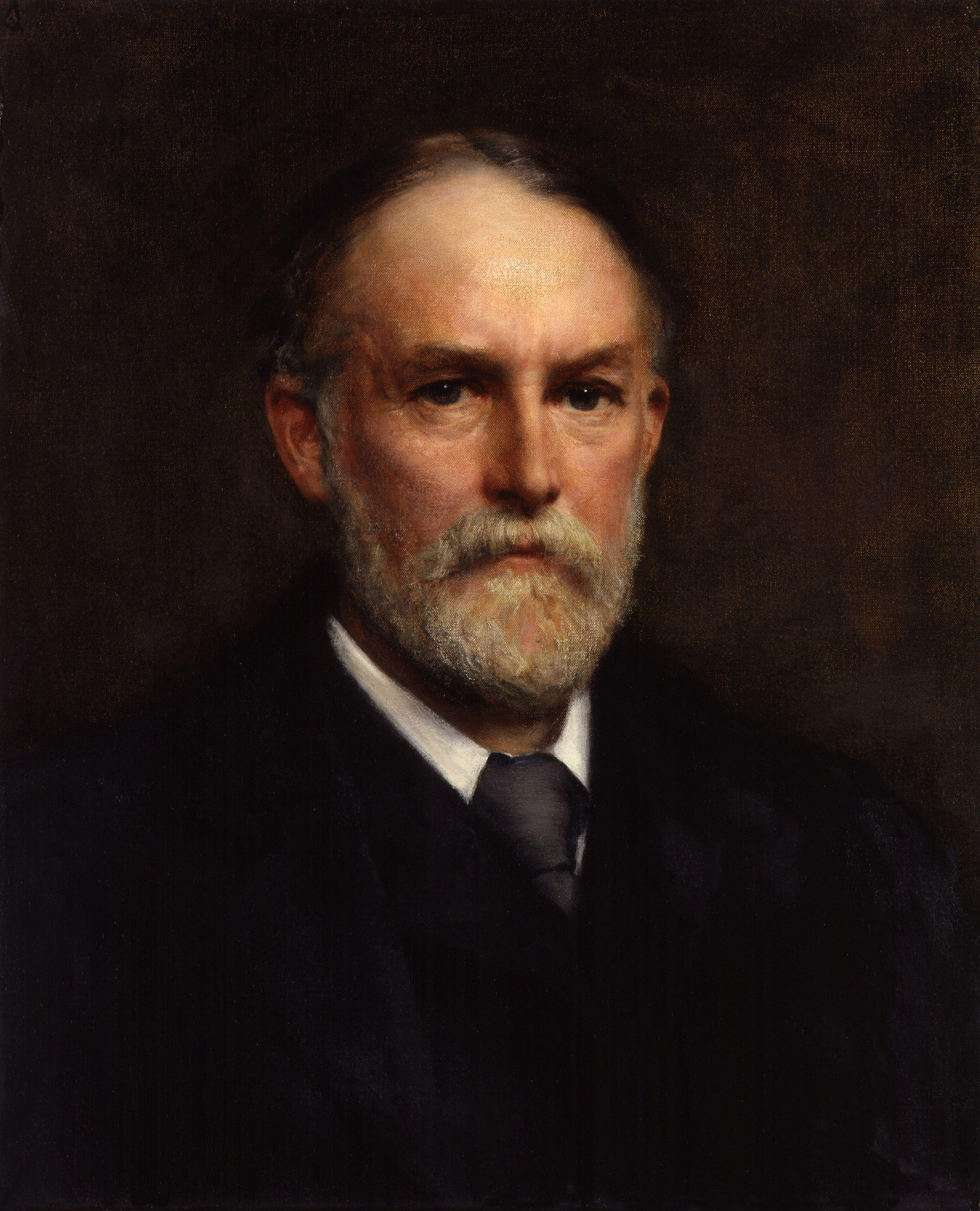
Frederic William Henry Myers

Wontner was born in Stockwell, Surrey, the son of the architect, designer and renderer William Hoff Wontner (1814–1881) and Catherine Smith.

Wontner received his earliest art education from his father. Under his father's direction, he worked with John William Godward (1861–1922), a noted exponent of what became known as Greco-Roman style, who was an acquaintance of the Wontner family. Godward was five years older than Wontner, and the pair became great friends.

In around 1885, Wontner began teaching at the St John's Wood Art School, after he had moved to Hamilton Garden Square. He was a minor painter who was part of the neo-classical movement in England, led by Alma-Tadema. His style favoured seductively languorous women against classical or oriental marbled backdrops.

His faithfully rendered fabrics draped over patently European models somehow created an air of Orientalism. His work was exhibited at the Royal Academy from 1879, and also at the Society of British Artists and at the Royal Institute of Painters in Water Colours. When the Grosvenor Gallery closed in 1890, Wontner exhibited at the New Gallery.

== Private life ==
On 7 June 1894, at St. Dominic's Priory Church, Naverstock Hill, Hampstead Wontner married Jessie Marguerite Keene (1872–1950), a daughter of Charles Joseph Keene. The couple had no children. Wontner, then of Ripple, Worcestershire, died at the Worcester Infirmary on 23 September 1930 and was buried at Ripple three days later.

== Work ==
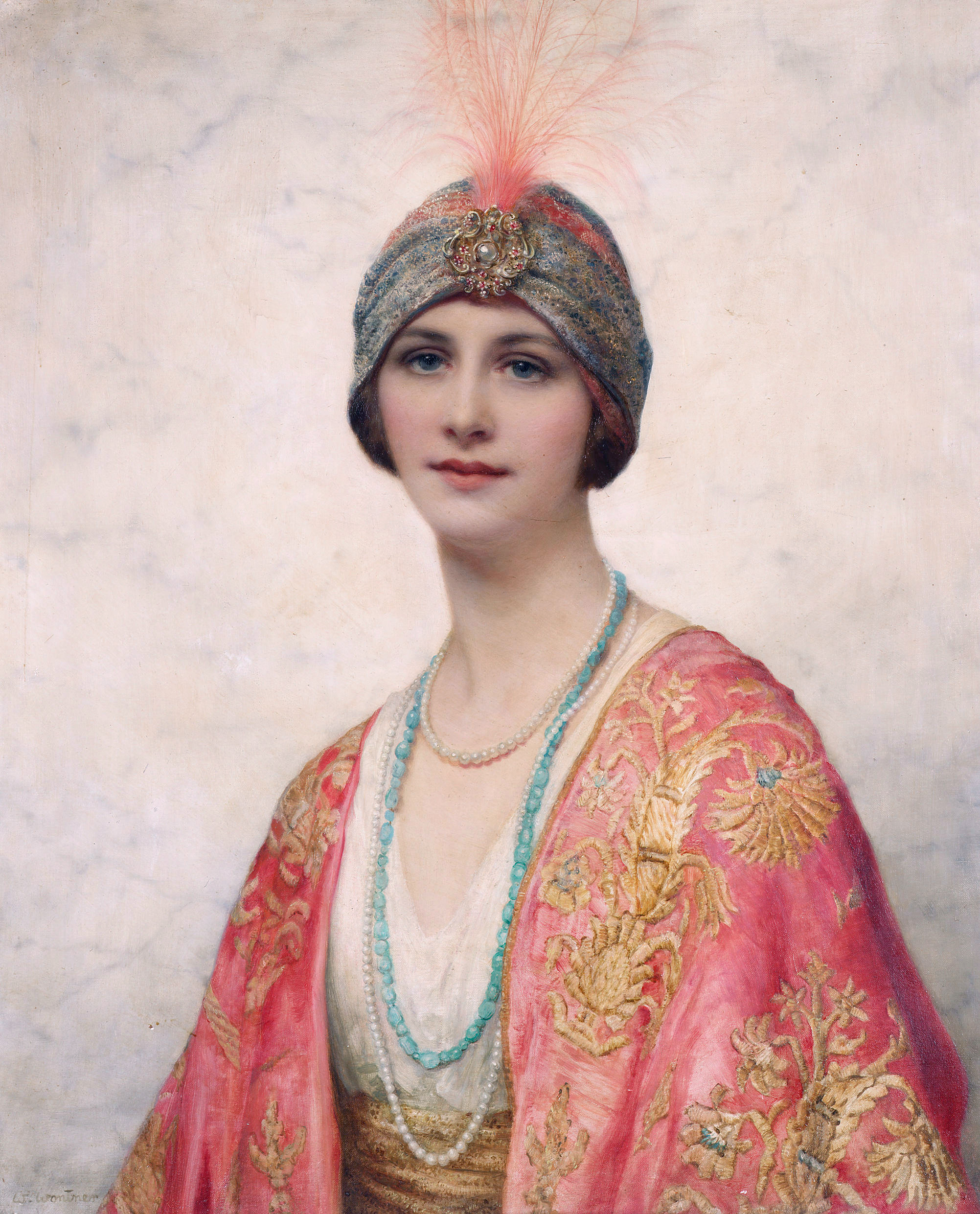
A Beauty in Eastern costume, 1916-1925

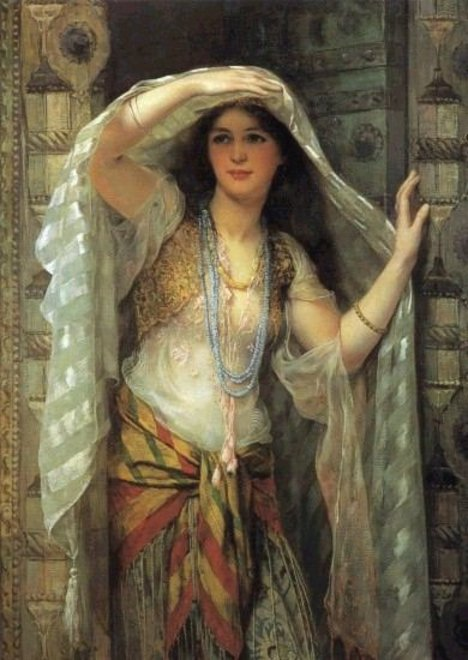
Lady of Baghdad, 1900

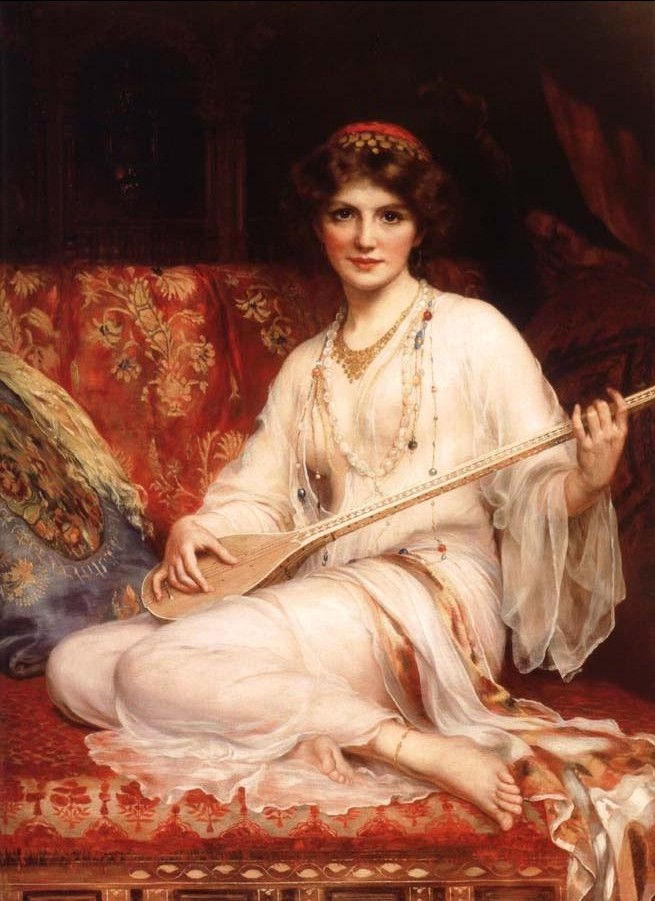
The Dancing Girl, 1903

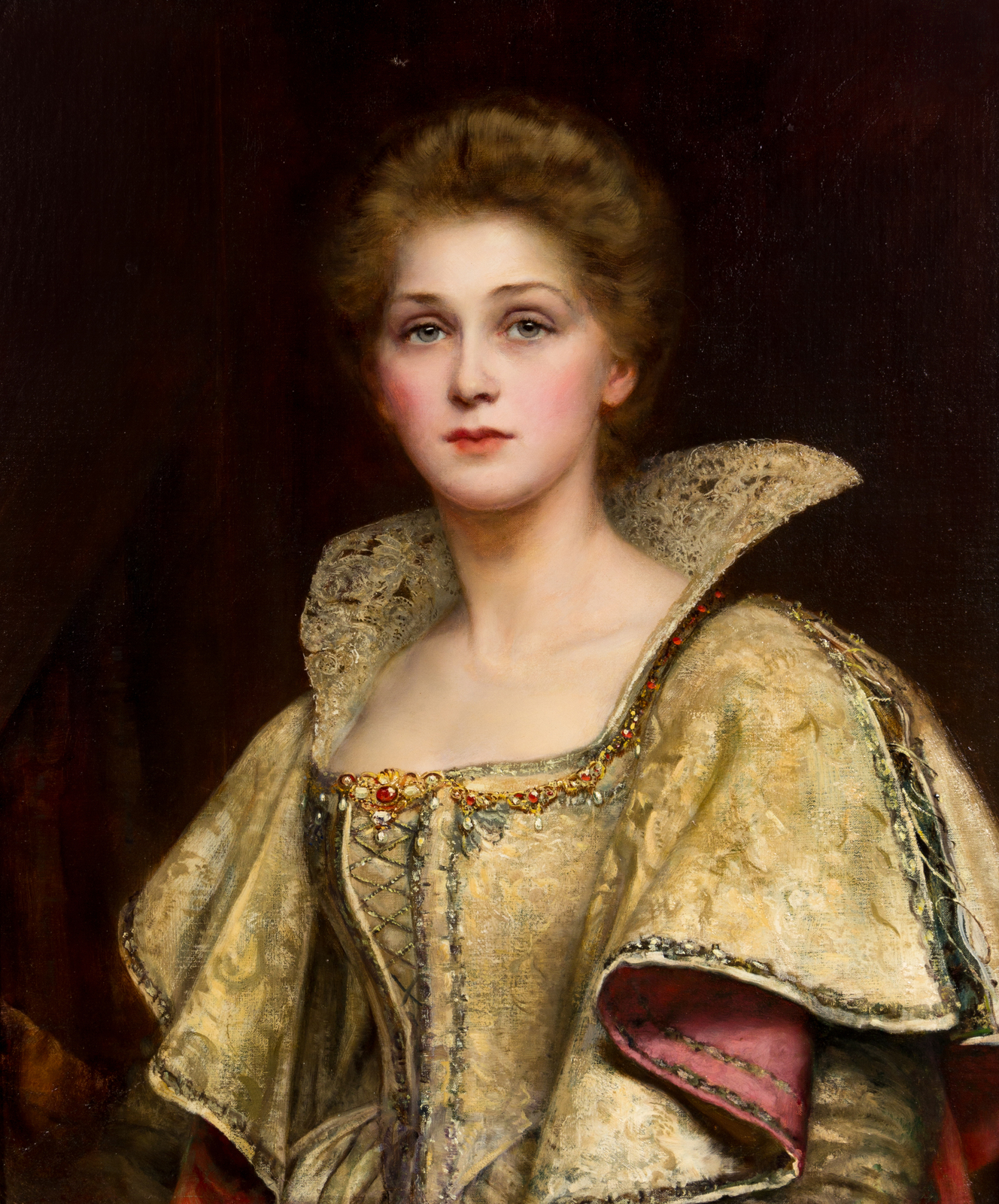
Amy Robsart, 1900

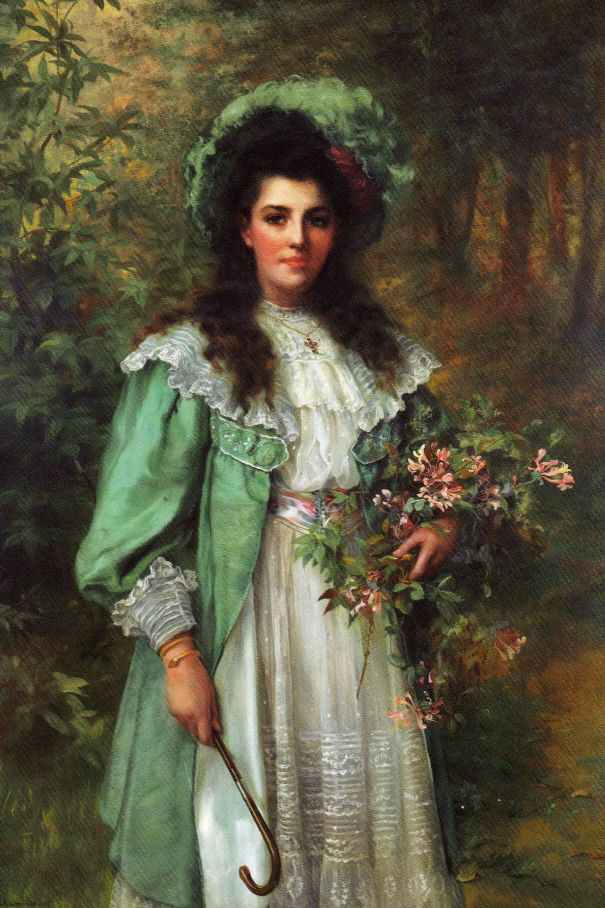
Honeysuckle, 1907

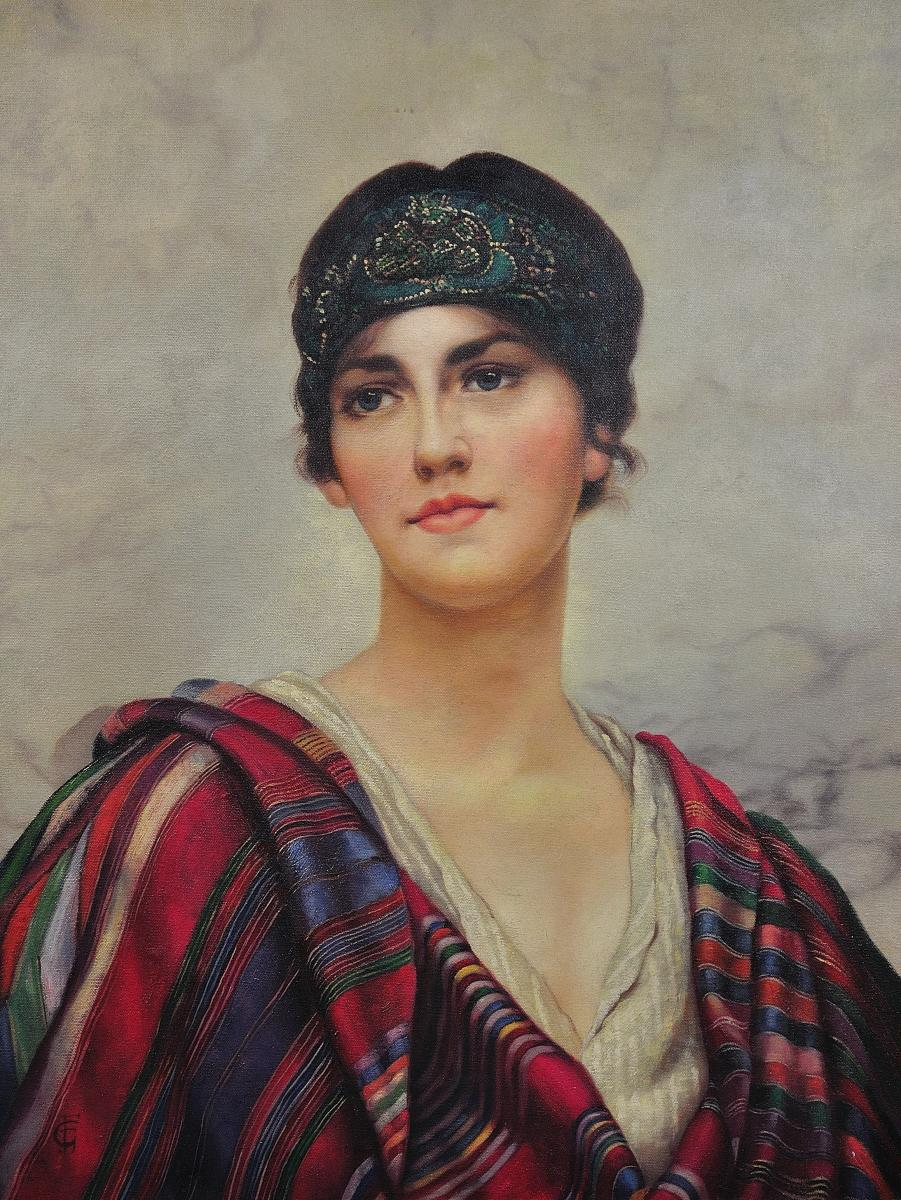
Femme fatale, 1882

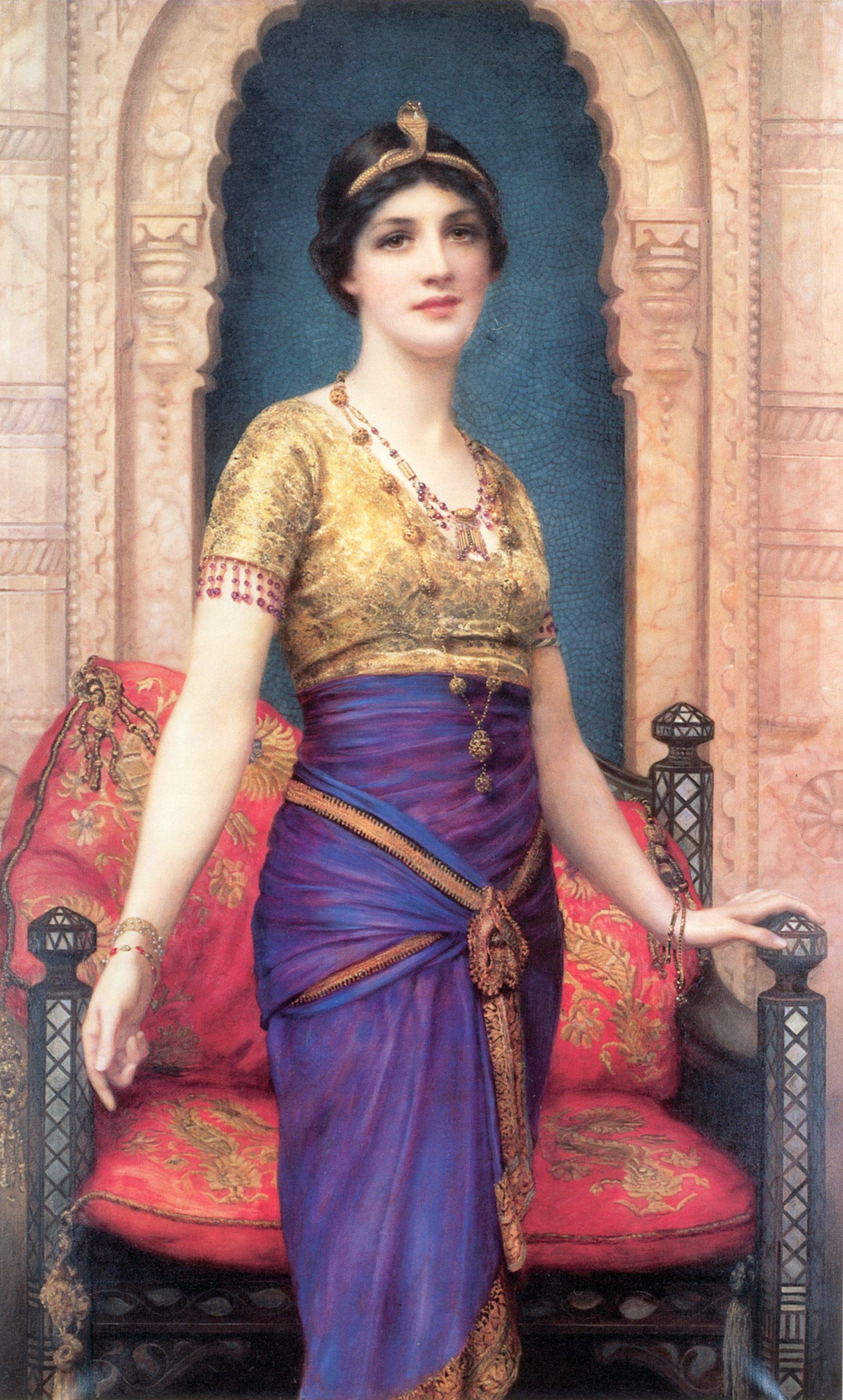
An Egyptian Beauty

== See also ==
- List of Orientalist artists
- Orientalism
