= Francis Babington =

English divine and academic administrator

Francis Babington D.D. (also Babbington, died 1569) was an English divine and an academic administrator at the University of Oxford. He was elected Master (head) of Balliol College, Oxford on 2 September 1559, a post he held until he resigned the following year on 27 October 1560. Babington was Vice-Chancellor of Oxford University from 1560 to 1562. He was also Rector of Lincoln College, Oxford, from 1560 until he resigned in 1563.

== Life ==
Babington is said to have been a native of Leicestershire, to have entered Christ's College, Cambridge, in 1544, and to have taken his B.A. degree in 1548–9. Two years later he was appointed Fellow of St John's College, Cambridge, and in 1552 became M.A. By 1555 he must have changed his religion, for at that date his name is found appended to the Roman Catholic articles of belief. About the same time he seems to have transferred his residence to Oxford, where he 'incepted' in arts 1554. After three years, he was unanimously chosen Proctor of his new university (1557), being already a Fellow of All Souls College. In 1557 and 1558, he successively took his Bachelor's and Doctor's degrees in Divinity; but Wood adds a special warning that such rapid promotion was only because Oxford University was very empty, and wanted "theologists to perform the requisite offices." There were only three doctors in theology who proceeded in six years; and sermons were so rare, that scarce one was given. It is only fair, however, to add that in another passage Wood mentions Francis Babington as renowned for his philosophical and logical disputations.

In 1559, Queen Elizabeth I's visitors removed William Wright from the mastership of Balliol College, Oxford, and appointed Dr Babington instead. Dr Babington had no objection to heaping together a plurality of livings and offices. Between 1557 and 1560, he was rector of at least four parishes: Milton Keynes, Twyford, Sherrington Aldworth, and Adstock; and two or three of these he must have held together. Besides these preferments he was, in May 1560, appointed Rector of Lincoln College, Oxford, and was Sir John Mason's commissary or Vice-Chancellor of Oxford University in 1560, 1561, and 1562. He even held the Lady Margaret readership in divinity for 1561, although the statutes forbade its being held by the Vice-Chancellor.

In March 1562, he appears in conjunction with "Anthony Forster, of Cumnore, gent.", as assisting in forcing a Protestant warden upon the Roman Catholic fellows of Merton College. Wood has given a graphic description of the whole scene. Dr Babington was the Earl of Leicester's chaplain, and seems about this time to have been high in favour with that nobleman. Anthony à Wood tells us that he was one of Leicester's five most trusted advisers in Oxford, and was chosen to preach Amy Robsart's funeral sermon at St Mary's Church, Oxford, on which occasion he "tript once or twice by recommending to his auditors the virtues of that lady so pitifully murdered instead of so pitifully slain." His text was 'Beati mortui qui in Domino moriuntur' (1560) (Bartlett's Cumnor). In the same year, Dr Babington stood as the representative of the more conservative party for the deanery of Christ Church, Oxford against Dr Sampson, the great pillar of the puritanical body. Strype, in his account of this contest, describes Dr Babington as "a man of mean learning and of a complying temper", but he failed in his candidature. He seems by this time to have been losing Leicester's favour, and was more than suspected of being a concealed Papist. In 1563, he had to resign the rectorship of Lincoln College, and two years later was forced to flee overseas, where he is said to have died in 1569.

== Sources ==
"Babington, Francis" . Dictionary of National Biography. London: Smith, Elder & Co. 1885–1900.

Academic offices
Preceded by William Wright	Master of Balliol College, Oxford; 1559–1560	Succeeded by Anthony Garnet
Preceded by John Warner	Vice-Chancellor of Oxford University; 1560–1562	Succeeded by Thomas Whyte
Preceded by Henry Henshaw	Rector of Lincoln College, Oxford; 1560–1563	Succeeded by John Bridgewater
