= Robsart, New Mexico =

Robsart
- Unincorporated community
- Location within the state of New Mexico Robsart (the United States)
- Coordinates: 33°44′11″N 105°49′59″W
- Country: United States
- State: New Mexico
- County: Lincoln
- Time zone: UTC-7 (Mountain (MST))
  - Summer (DST): UTC-6 (MDT)

Robsart is a ghost town in Lincoln County, New Mexico, United States, which is located west of the Lincoln National Forest on Highway 54, north of the town of Carrizozo.

Robsart is served by the Southern Pacific Railroad; little remains of Robsart but the Robsart Siding.

Robsart may have been named by the Southern Pacific Railroad after Amy Robsart from the Sir Walter Scott book Kenilworth, as Robsart, Saskatchewan received its name from the Canadian Pacific Railway.

== Robsart Tank ==
Robsart Tank is a reservoir which gets its name from the nearby unincorporated area, Robsart.
