= Walter Hodges (academic) =

English academic administrator

Walter Hodges D.D. (died 14 January 1757) was an English academic administrator at the University of Oxford.

Hodges was elected Provost (head) of Oriel College, Oxford, on 24 October 1727, a post he held until his death in 1757. During his time as Provost of Oriel College, he was also Vice-Chancellorof Oxford University from 1741 until 1744.

Academic offices
Preceded by George Carter	Provost of Oriel College, Oxford; 1727–1757	Succeeded by Chardin Musgrave
Preceded by Theophilus Leigh	Vice-Chancellor of Oxford University; 1741–1744	Succeeded by Euseby Isham
