= Amy Robsart =

Wife of Robert Dudley, 1st Earl of Leicester

Amy, Lady Dudley
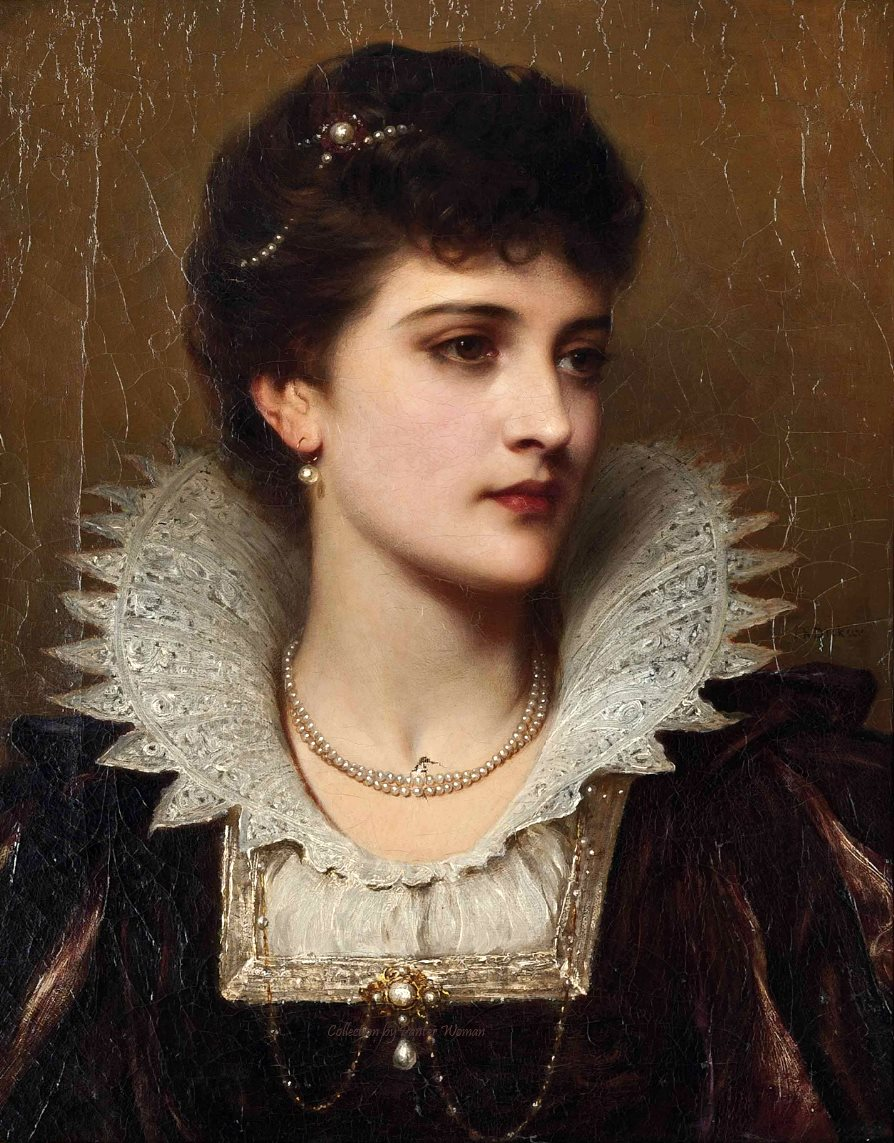
- Fantasy portrait by T.F. Dicksee, 19th century
- Born: Amy Robsart; 7 June 1532; Norfolk, England
- Died: 8 September 1560 (aged 28); Cumnor Place, Oxfordshire, England
- Cause of death: Cervical fracture of the spine
- Known for: Death under mysterious circumstances
- Spouse: Robert Dudley (m. 1550)

Amy, Lady Dudley (née Robsart; 7 June 1532 – 8 September 1560) was the first wife of Robert Dudley, who later became Earl of Leicester, favourite of Elizabeth I of England. In the variable spelling of the day, her name also was spelled as Amye Duddley. She is primarily known for her death, allegedly by falling down a flight of stairs in her home, the circumstances of which were regarded as suspicious at the time, and have often been so subsequently. Amy Robsart was an heiress, as the only child of a substantial Norfolk gentleman.

At nearly 18 years of age, she married Lord Robert Dudley, a son of John Dudley, 1st Duke of Northumberland. In 1553, Robert Dudley was condemned to death and imprisoned in the Tower of London, where Amy Dudley was allowed to visit him. After his release the couple lived in straitened financial circumstances until, with the accession of Elizabeth I in late 1558, Dudley became Master of the Horse, an important court office. It was rumoured that the Queen soon fell in love with him and there was talk that Amy Dudley, who did not follow her husband to court, was suffering from an illness, and that Elizabeth would perhaps marry her favourite should his wife die. The rumours grew more sinister when Elizabeth remained single against the common expectation that she would accept one of her many foreign suitors.

Amy Dudley lived with friends in different parts of the country, having her own household and hardly ever seeing her husband. In the morning of 8 September 1560, at Cumnor Place near Oxford, she insisted on sending away her servants, and later was found dead at the foot of a flight of stairs with a broken neck and two wounds on her head. The coroner's jury's finding was that she had died of a fall downstairs; the verdict was "misfortune", accidental death. The most widely accepted modern explanations of her death have been breast cancer and suicide, although a few historians have probed murder scenarios. The medical evidence of the coroner's report, which was found in 2008, is compatible with accident as well as suicide and other violence.

Amy Dudley's death caused a scandal. Despite the inquest's outcome, Robert Dudley was widely suspected to have orchestrated his wife's demise, a view not shared by most modern historians. He remained Elizabeth's closest favourite, but with respect to her reputation she could not risk a marriage with him. A tradition that Sir Richard Verney, a follower of Robert Dudley, organized Amy Dudley's violent death evolved early, and Leicester's Commonwealth, a notorious and influential libel of 1584 against Robert Dudley, by then Earl of Leicester, perpetuated this version of events. Interest in Amy Dudley's fate was rekindled in the 19th century by Walter Scott's novel, Kenilworth (1821), which presented her death as murder, and numerous adaptations of this for the stage, and in art, which typically took the same line.

== Life ==
Amy Robsart was born in Norfolk, the heiress of a substantial gentleman-farmer and grazier, Sir John Robsart of Syderstone, and his wife, Elizabeth Scott. Amy Robsart grew up at her mother's house, Stanfield Hall (near Wymondham), and, like her future husband, in a firmly Protestant household. She received a good education and wrote in a fine hand. Three days before her 18th birthday she married Robert Dudley, a younger son of John Dudley, Earl of Warwick. Amy and Robert, who were of the same age, probably first met about ten months before their wedding. The wedding contract of May 1550 specified that Amy would inherit her father's estate only after both her parents' death, and after the marriage the young couple depended heavily on both their fathers' gifts, especially Robert's. It was most probably a love-match, a "carnal marriage", as the wedding guest William Cecil later commented disapprovingly. The marriage was celebrated on 4 June 1550 at the royal palace of Sheen, with Edward VI in attendance.

The Earl of Warwick and future Duke of Northumberland was the most powerful man in England, leading the government of the young King Edward VI. The match, though by no means a prize, was acceptable to him as it strengthened his influence in Norfolk. The young couple dwelt mostly at court or with Amy's parents-in-law at Ely House; in the first half of 1553 they lived at Somerset House, Robert Dudley being keeper of this great Renaissance palace. In May 1553 Lady Jane Grey became Amy Dudley's sister-in-law, and after her rule of nine days as England's queen, Robert Dudley was sentenced to death and imprisoned in the Tower of London. He remained there from July 1553 until October 1554; from September 1553 Amy was allowed to visit "and there to tarry with" him at the Tower's Lieutenant's pleasure.

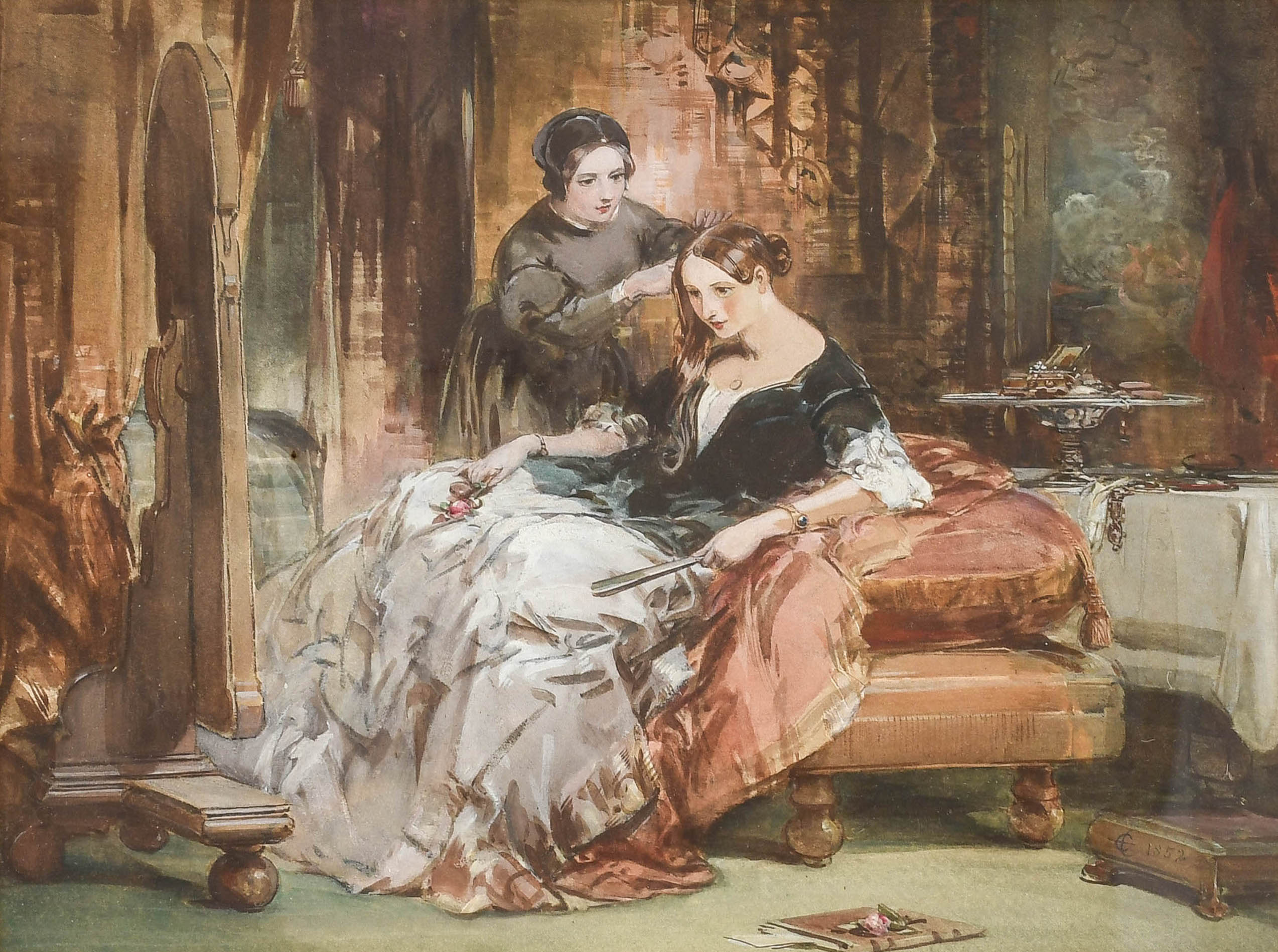
Amy and her maid, watercolour by George Cattermole, 1852

After his release Robert Dudley was short of money and he and Amy were helped out financially by their families. Their lifestyle had to remain modest, though, and Lord Robert (as he was known) was heaping up considerable debts. Sir John Robsart died in 1554; his wife followed him to the grave in the spring of 1557, which meant that the Dudleys could inherit the Robsart estate with the Queen's permission. Amy's ancestral manor house of Syderstone had been uninhabitable for many decades, her childhood home of Stanfield had been left to her mother for life by her first husband, but on her mother's death had reverted to Amy Robsart's half-brother John Appleyard, and the couple were now living in Throcking, Hertfordshire, at the house of William Hyde, when not in London. In August 1557, Robert Dudley went to fight for Philip II of Spain (who was then Mary I's husband) at the Battle of St. Quentin in France. From this time a business letter from Amy Dudley survives, settling some of her husband's debts in his absence, "although I forgot to move my lord thereof before his departing, he being sore troubled with weighty affairs, and I not being altogether in quiet for his sudden departing".

In the summer of 1558, Robert and Amy Dudley were looking for a suitable residence of their own in order to settle in Norfolk; nothing came of this, however, before the death of Queen Mary I in November 1558. Upon the accession of Elizabeth I Robert Dudley became Master of the Horse and his place was now at court at almost constant attendance on the Queen. By April 1559, Queen Elizabeth seemed to be in love with Lord Robert, and several diplomats reported that some at court already speculated that the Queen would marry him, "in case his wife should die", as Amy Dudley was very ill in one of her breasts. (Note: "está muy mala de un pecho", in the Spanish ambassador de Feria's original dispatch (Adams 1995 p. 63).) Very soon court observers noted that Elizabeth never let Robert Dudley from her side. He visited his wife at Throcking for a couple of days at Easter 1559, and Amy Dudley came to London in May 1559 for about a month. At this time, on 6 June, the new Spanish ambassador de Quadra wrote that her health had improved, but that she was careful with her food. She also made a trip to Suffolk; by September she was residing in the house of Sir Richard Verney at Compton Verney in Warwickshire.

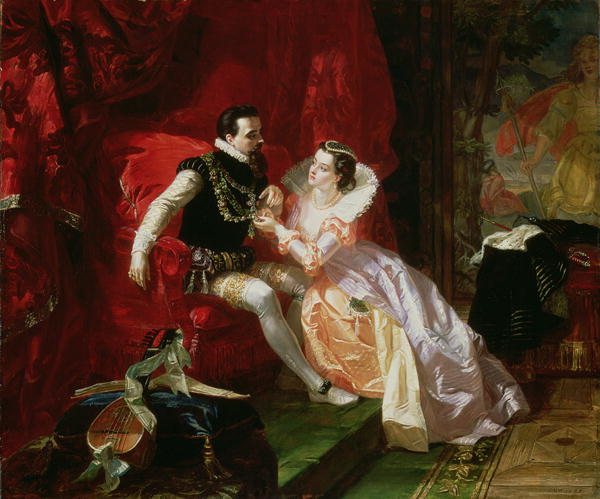
Leicester and Amy Robsart at Cumnor Hall (1866) by Edward Matthew Ward. Fantasy portrait after Walter Scott's novel Kenilworth

By late 1559, several foreign princes were vying for the Queen's hand; indignant at Elizabeth's little serious interest in their candidate, the Spanish ambassador de Quadra and his Imperial colleague were informing each other and their superiors that Lord Robert was sending his wife poison and that Elizabeth was only fooling them, "keeping Lord Robert's enemies and the country engaged with words until this wicked deed of killing his wife is consummated". Parts of the nobility also held Dudley responsible for Elizabeth's failure to marry, and plots to assassinate him abounded. In March 1560 de Quadra informed Philip II: "Lord Robert told somebody … that if he live another year he will be in a very different position from now. … They say that he thinks of divorcing his wife." Amy never saw her husband again after her London visit in 1559. A projected trip of his to visit her and other family never materialized. Queen Elizabeth did not really allow her favourite a wife; according to a contemporary court chronicle, he "was commanded to say that he did nothing with her, when he came to her, as seldom he did".

From December 1559 until her death, Amy Dudley lived at Cumnor Place, also sometimes known as Cumnor Hall, in the village of Cumnor in Berkshire (on the outskirts of Oxford, and now in Oxfordshire). The house, an altered 14th century monastic complex, was rented by a friend of the Dudleys and possible relative of Amy, Sir Anthony Forster. He lived there with his wife and Mrs. Odingsells and Mrs. Owen, relations of the house's owner. Amy's chamber was a large, sumptuous upper story apartment, the best of the house, with a separate entrance and staircase leading up to it. At the house's rear there were a terrace garden, a pond, and a deer park. Amy Dudley received the proceeds of the Robsart estate directly into her hands and largely paid for her own household, which comprised about 10 servants. She regularly ordered dresses and finery as accounts and a letter from her of as late as 24 August 1560 show. She also received presents from her husband. No picture of her is known to have survived, though according to the Imperial ambassador Caspar Breuner, writing in 1559, she was "a very beautiful wife".

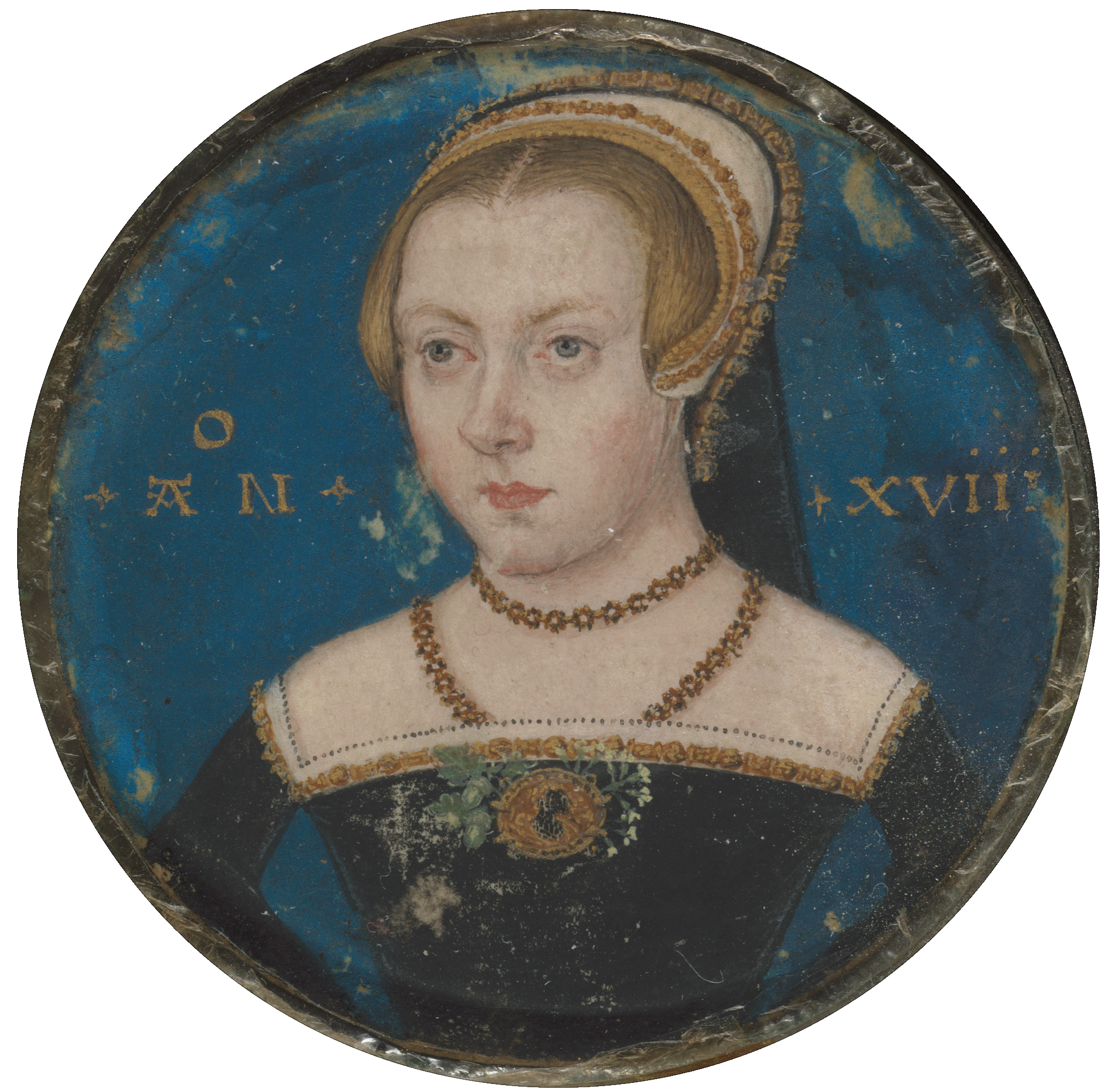
Portrait of an Unknown Lady (ca. 1535), by Lucas Horenbout. Possible portrait miniature of Amy Dudley

However, in 2009, Eric Ives suggested that a portrait miniature now in the Yale Center for British Art, the Yale Miniature, was, in fact, Amy Robsart. Chris Skidmore concurs with this in his 2010 book Death and the Virgin: Elizabeth, Dudley and the Mysterious Fate of Amy Robsart, adding that Robert Dudley used the oak as a personal symbol in his youth, the sitter wearing oak leaves and gillyflowers at her breast. Recently a point has been made of the fact that the sprig of yellow flowers at the lady's breast corresponds with the colours of the Robsart coat of arms, green and yellow, or Vert and Or. The name gilliflower or gillyflower derives from the French giroflée from Greek karyophyllon meaning nut-leaf, the association deriving from the flower's scent, making it another possible wordplay for oak for Robert or even Robsart, Robur being Latin for oak.

The Yale miniature (Portrait of an Unknown Lady), which was formerly attributed to Levina Teerlinc and dated c. 1550 is now thought to be the work of Lucas Horenbout, c. 1535, which would make it impossible as a portrait of Amy Robsart, who was about three at that date. Horenbout died in 1544, before Robsart reached the age of 18 stated for the sitter.

== Death and inquest ==
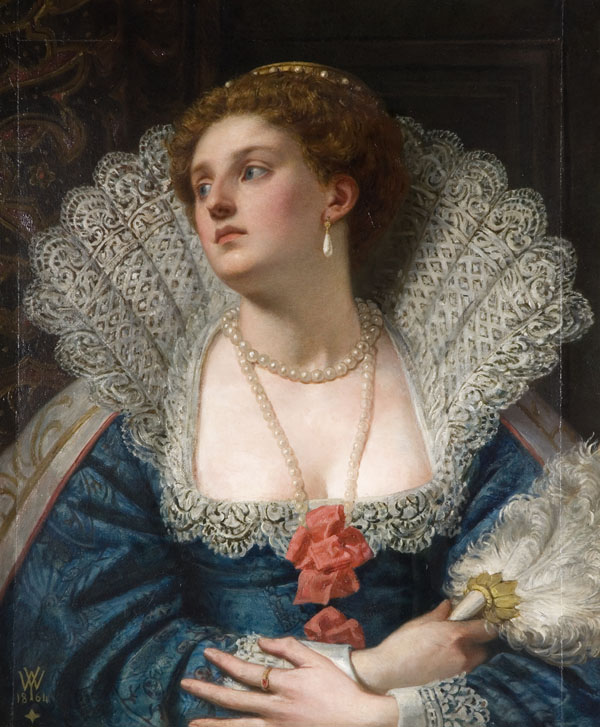
Fantasy Portrait. Amy Robsart, 1864, by William Frederick Yeames, Wolverhampton Art Gallery

On Sunday, 8 September 1560, the day of a fair at Abingdon, Amy Robsart was found dead at the foot of a set of stairs at Cumnor Place. Robert Dudley, at Windsor Castle with the Queen, was told of her death by a messenger on 9 September and immediately wrote to his steward Thomas Blount, who had himself just departed for Cumnor. He desperately urged him to find out what had happened and to call for an inquest; this had already been opened when Blount arrived. He informed his master that Lady Amy Dudley had risen early and

would not that day suffer one of her own sort to tarry at home, and was so earnest to have them gone to the fair, that with any of her own sort that made reason of tarrying at home she was very angry, and came to Mrs. Odingsells … who refused that day to go to the fair, and was very angry with her also. Because [Mrs. Odingsells] said it was no day for gentlewomen to go … Whereunto my lady answered and said that she might choose and go at her pleasure, but all hers should go; and was very angry. They asked who should keep her company if all they went; she said Mrs. Owen should keep her company at dinner; the same tale doth Picto, who doth dearly love her, confirm. Certainly, my Lord, as little while as I have been here, I have heard divers tales of her that maketh me judge her to be a strange woman of mind.

Mrs. Picto was Lady Amy Dudley's maid and Thomas Blount asked whether she thought what had happened was "chance or villainy":

she said by her faith she doth judge very chance, and neither done by man nor by herself. For herself, she said, she was a good virtuous gentlewoman, and daily would pray upon her knees; and divers times she saith that she hath heard her pray to God to deliver her from desperation. Then, said I, she might have an evil toy [suicide] in her mind. No, good Mr. Blount, said Picto, do not judge so of my words; if you should so gather, I am sorry I said so much.

Blount continued, wondering:

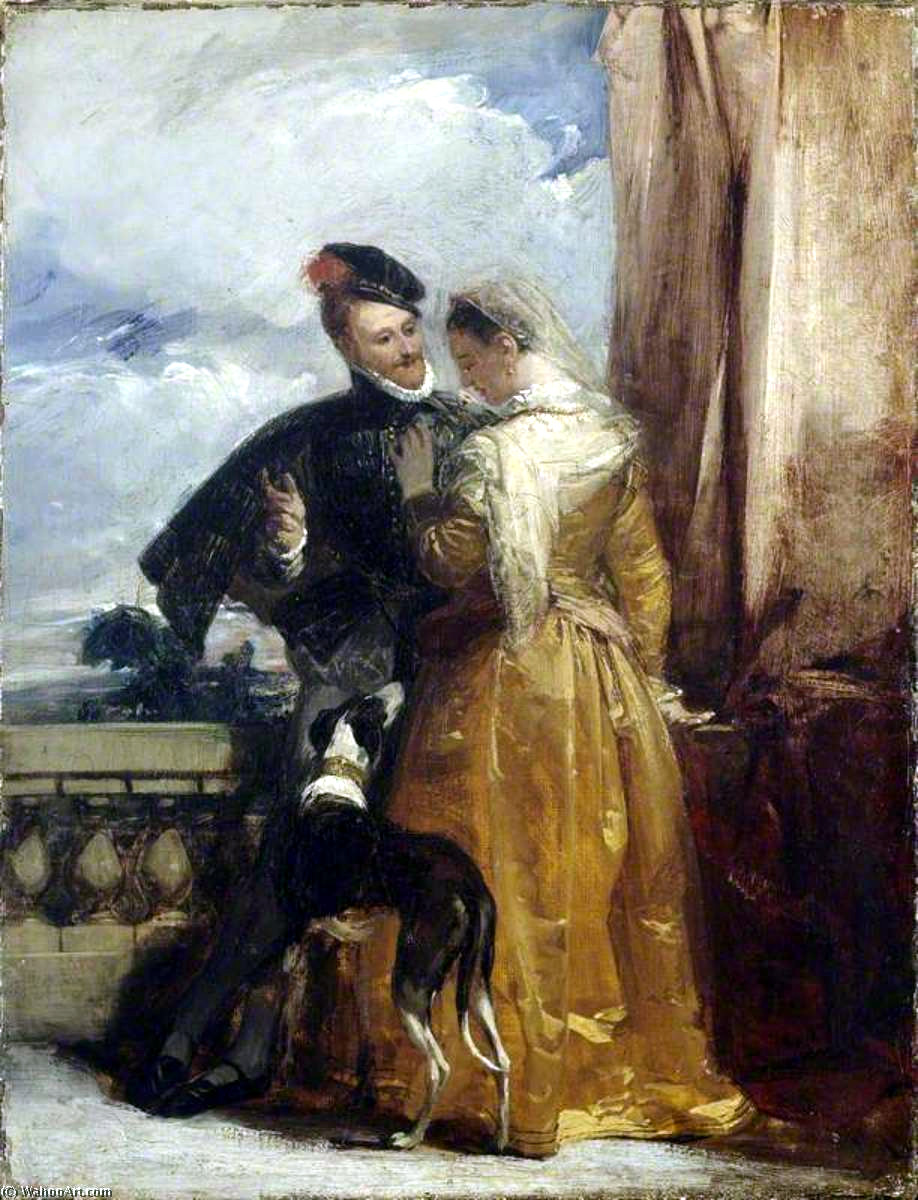
Robert Dudley and Amy Robsart, watercolour, 1820s, Richard Parkes Bonington

My Lord, it is most strange that this chance should fall upon you. It passeth the judgment of any man to say how it is; but truly the tales I do hear of her maketh me to think she had a strange mind in her: as I will tell you at my coming.

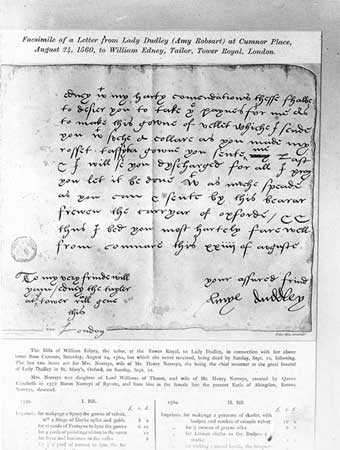
Amy's last letter to her London tailor on 24 August 1560.

The coroner and the 15 jurors were local gentlemen and yeomen of substance. A few days later Blount wrote that some of the jury were no friends of Anthony Forster (a good sign that they would not "conceal any fault, if any be") and that they were proceeding very thoroughly:

they be very secret, and yet do I hear a whispering that they can find no presumptions of evil. And if I may say to your Lordship my conscience: I think some of them be sorry for it, God forgive me. … Mine own opinion is much quieted … the circumstances and as many things as I can learn doth persuade me that only misfortune hath done it, and nothing else.

The jury's foreman assured Robert Dudley in a letter of his own that for all they could find out, it appeared to be an accident. Dudley, desperately seeking to avert damage from what he called "my case", was relieved to hear the impending outcome, but thought "another substantial company of honest men" should undertake a further investigation "for more knowledge of truth". This panel should include any of Lady Amy's available friends and her half-brothers John Appleyard and Arthur Robsart, both of whom he had ordered to Cumnor immediately after Amy's death. Nothing came of this proposal.

The coroner's verdict, pronounced at the local Assizes on 1 August 1561, was that Lady Amy Dudley, "being alone in a certain chamber … accidentally fell precipitously down" the adjoining stairs "to the very bottom of the same". She had sustained two head injuries—one "of the depth of a quarter of a thumb", the other "of the depth of two thumbs". (Note: Chris Skidmore interprets a thumb as the equivalent of about an inch (2, 54 cm), saying one wound was c. 5 mm deep, the other c. 5 cm; the locations of the head wounds are not specified in the coroner's report (Skidmore 2010 p. 232).) She had also, "by reason of the accidental injury or of that fall and of Lady Amy's own body weight falling down the aforesaid stairs", broken her neck, "on account of which ... the same Lady Amy then and there died instantly; ... and thus the jurors say on their oath that the Lady Amy ... by misfortune came to her death and not otherwise, as they are able to agree at present".

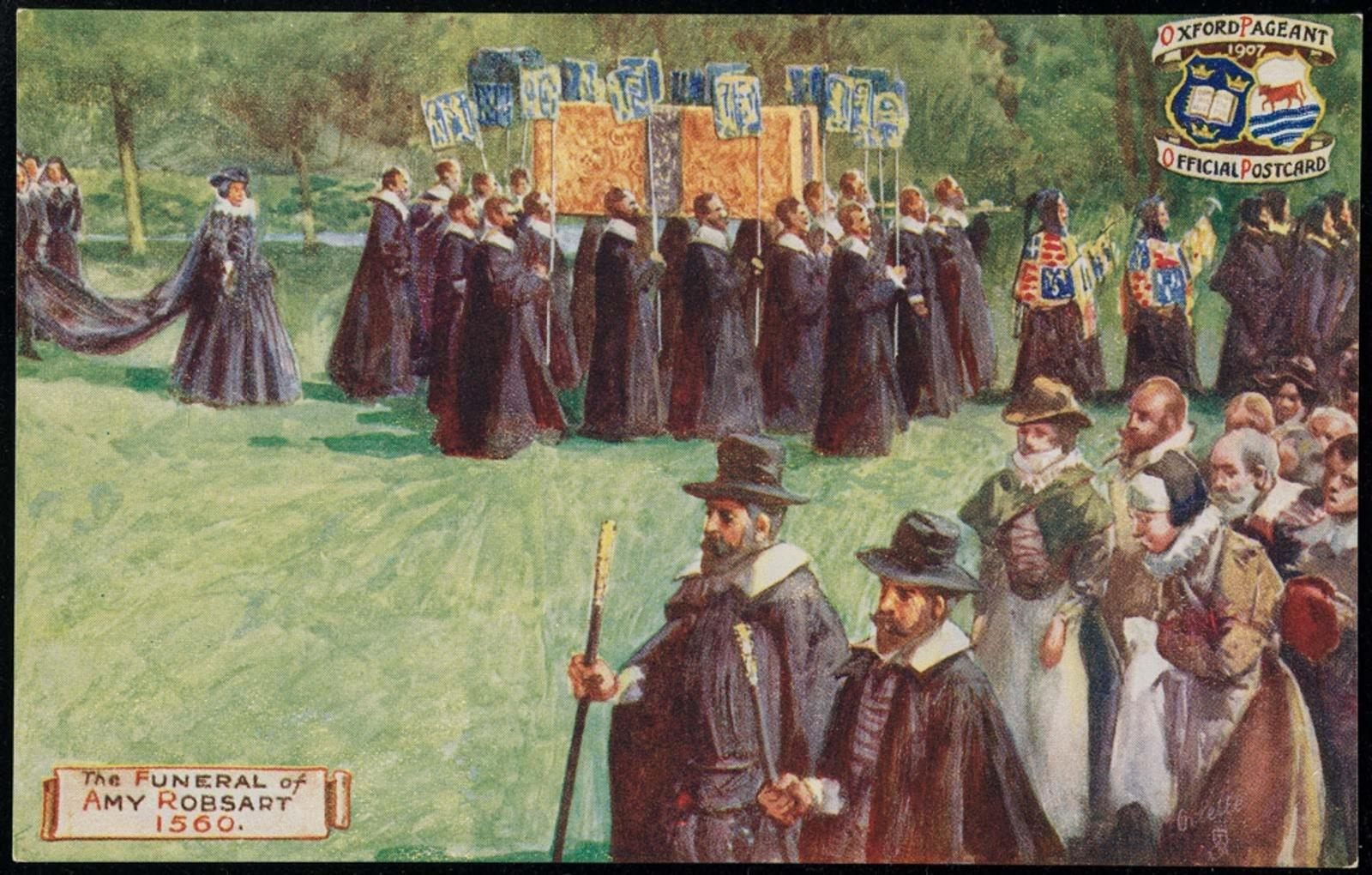
Amy's funeral, as restaged for a pageant in Oxford in 1907

Following her death, Amy Dudley's body was taken to Gloucester Hall, Oxford, where it lay in the room which may now be the Junior Common Room of Worcester College, Oxford. Her coffin was covered with black cloth and the armorials of the couple. On 22 September 1560 it was carried in a large procession to the University Church of St Mary the Virgin, with choristers, the mayor of Oxford, heralds and members of the university. The coffin was carried on a large cloth "herse" 14 feet high at the top, where there were heraldic ornaments, and 10 at the sides, 10 feet long, and 7 1/2 wide. The chief mourner was "Mrs Norrys" or Margery Norris, the queen's intimate friend, attended by other ladies. The sermon was preached by Francis Babington who was both Dudley's chaplain and Vice-Chancellor of Oxford University. According to the gossipy antiquary Anthony Wood, writing a century later, Babington made the mistake of calling Robsart "murdered" in his sermon, thereby permanently losing Dudley's favour when he found out about it. She was buried in the church, though the exact spot is now not known.

The funerary ceremonies were said to have cost Dudley some £2,000 (roughly £1 million in 2021). He wore mourning for about six months but, as was within custom, did not attend the funeral, at which Lady Amy Dudley's half-brothers and neighbours, as well as prominent city and county citizens, played leading parts. The court went into mourning for over a month; Robert Dudley retired to his house at Kew. Six years later Dudley, as Chancellor of the University, hosted the queen in the same church as she heard four hours of theological disputations, before addressing the university in Latin on a visit to Oxford in 1566.

== Aftermath ==
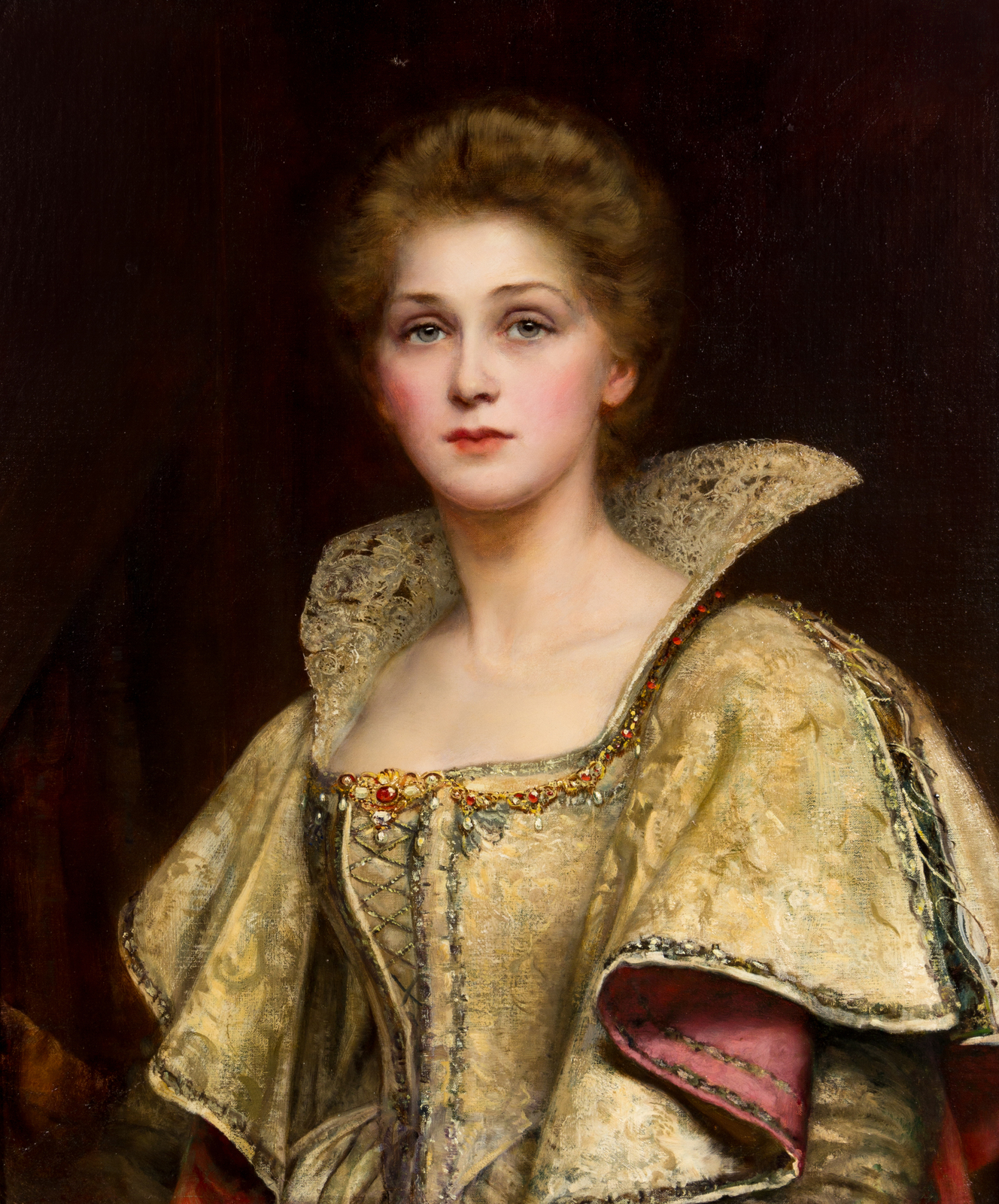
Fantasy portrait of Amy Robsart by William Clarke Wontner

Amy Dudley's death, happening amid renewed rumours about the Queen and her favourite, caused "grievous and dangerous suspicion, and muttering" in the country. Robert Dudley was shocked, dreading "the malicious talk that I know the wicked world will use". William Cecil, the Queen's Principal Secretary, felt himself threatened by the prospect of Dudley's becoming king consort and spread rumours against the eventuality.

Already knowing of her death before it was officially made public, he told the Spanish ambassador that Lord Robert and the Queen wished to marry and were about to do away with Lady Amy Dudley by poison, "giving out that she was ill but she was not ill at all". Likewise strongly opposed to a Dudley marriage, Nicholas Throckmorton, the English ambassador in France, went out of his way to draw attention to the scandalous gossip he heard at the French court. Although Cecil and Throckmorton made use of the scandal for their political and personal aims, they did not believe themselves that Robert Dudley had orchestrated his wife's death.

In October Robert Dudley returned to court, many believed, "in great hope to marry the Queen". Elizabeth's affection and favour towards him was undiminished, and, importuned by unsolicited advice against a marriage with Lord Robert, she declared the inquest had shown "the matter … to be contrary to which was reported" and to "neither touch his honesty nor her honour."

However, her international reputation and even her position at home were imperilled by the scandal, which seems to have convinced her that she could not risk a marriage with Dudley. Dudley himself had no illusions about his destroyed reputation, even when he was first notified of the jury's decision: "God's will be done; and I wish he had made me the poorest that creepeth on the ground, so this mischance had not happened to me." In September 1561, a month after the coroner's verdict was officially passed, the Earl of Arundel, one of Dudley's principal enemies, studied the testimonies in the hope of finding incriminating evidence against his rival.

=== John Appleyard ===
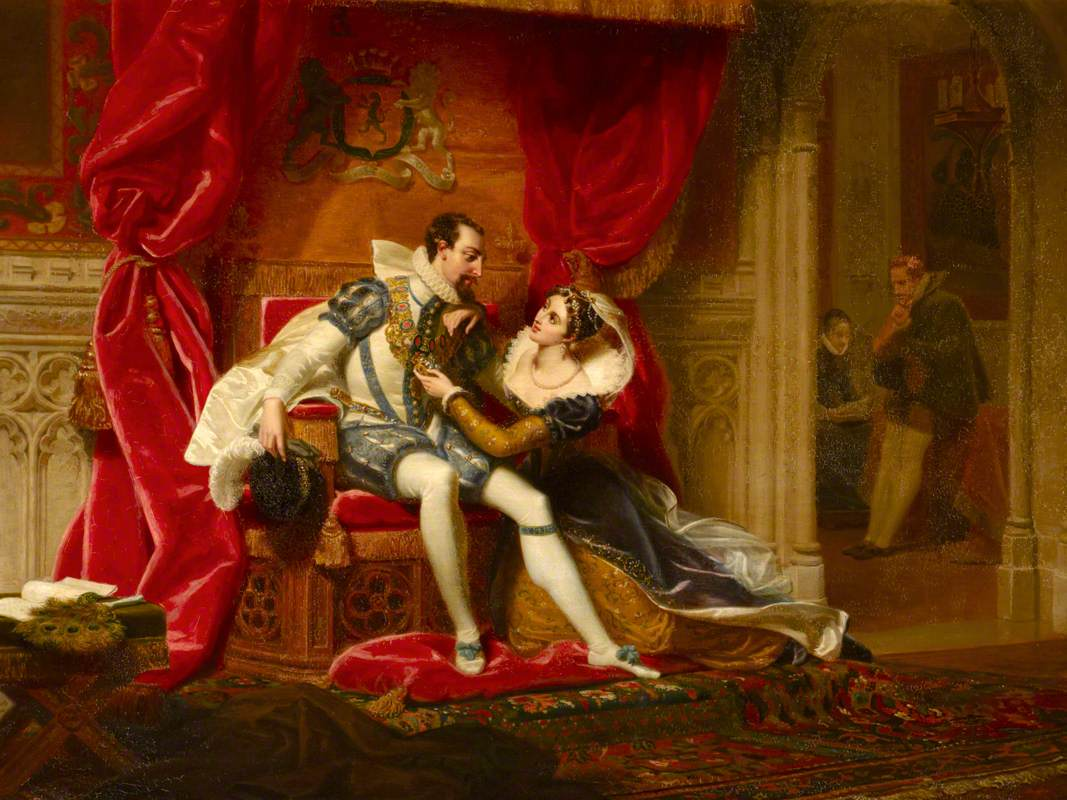
The Earl of Leicester's Visit to Amy Robsart at Cumnor Place, 1825, Henri Fradelle (1778–1865), Petworth House

John Appleyard had profited in terms of offices and annuities from his brother-in-law's rise ever since 1559; he was nevertheless disappointed with what he had got from Robert Dudley, now Earl of Leicester. In 1567 he was approached, apparently on behalf of the Duke of Norfolk and the Earl of Sussex, to accuse Leicester of the murder of his wife for a reward of £1,000 in cash. He refused to cooperate in the plot, although he had, he said, in the last few years come to believe that his half-sister was murdered. He had always been convinced of Dudley's innocence but thought it would be an easy matter to find out the real culprits. He said he had repeatedly asked for the Earl's help to this effect, claiming the jury had not yet come up with their verdict; Dudley had always answered that the matter should rest, since a jury had found that there was no murder, by due procedure of law. Now, as Leicester became aware of a plot against him, he summoned Appleyard and sent him away after a furious confrontation.

Some weeks later the Privy Council investigated the allegations about Norfolk, Sussex, and Leicester, and Appleyard found himself in the Fleet prison for about a month. Interrogated by Cecil and a panel of noblemen (among them the Earl of Arundel, but not Robert Dudley), he was commanded to answer in writing what had moved him to implicate "my Lord of Norfolk, the Earl of Sussex and others to stir up matter against my Lord of Leicester for the death of his wife", and what had moved him to say that "the death of the Earl of Leicester's wife" was "procured by any person". Appleyard, instead of giving answers, retracted all his statements; he had also requested to see the coroner's report and, after studying it in his cell, wrote that it fully satisfied him and had dispelled his concerns.

=== Early traditions and theories ===
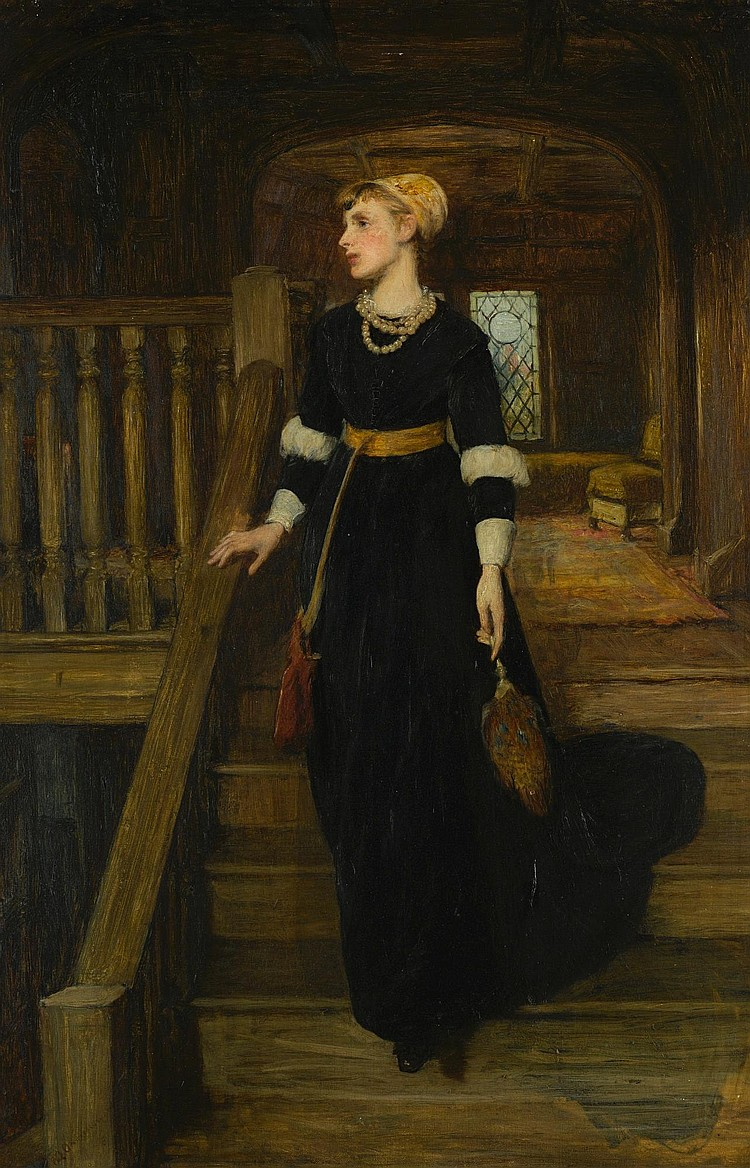
Amy Robsart walking to her death. 19th-century fantasy portrait by Sir William Quiller Orchardson

From the early 1560s there was a tradition involving Sir Richard Verney, a gentleman-retainer of Robert Dudley from Warwickshire, in whose house Lady Amy Dudley had stayed in 1559. A 1563 chronicle, which is heavily biased against the House of Dudley and was probably written by the Protestant activist John Hales, describes the rumours:

[t]he Lord Robert's wife brake her neck at Forster's house in Oxfordshire … her gentlewomen being gone forth to a fair. Howbeit it was thought she was slain, for Sir ----- Varney was there that day and whylest the deed was doing was going over the fair and tarried there for his man, who at length came, and he said, thou knave, why tarriest thou? He answered, should I come before I had done? Hast thou done? quoth Varney. Yeah, quoth the man, I have made it sure. … Many times before it was bruited by the Lord Robert his men that she was dead. … This Verney and divers his servants used before her death, to wish her death, which made the people to suspect the worse.

The first printed version of Amy Robsart's alleged murder appeared in the satirical libel Leicester's Commonwealth, a notorious propaganda work against the Earl of Leicester written by Catholic exiles in 1584. Here Sir Richard Verney goes directly to Cumnor Place, forces the servants to go to the market, and breaks Lady Amy's neck before placing her at the foot of the stairs; the jury's verdict is murder, and she is buried first secretly at the Cumnor parish church before being dug up and reburied at Oxford. Verney dies, communicating "that all the devils in hell" tore him in pieces; his servant (who was with him at the murder) having been killed in prison by Dudley's means before he could tell the story.

Enhanced by the considerable influence of Leicester's Commonwealth, the rumours about Amy Robsart's death developed into a tradition of embellished folklore. As early as 1608, a domestic tragedy named A Yorkshire Tragedy alluded to her fall from a pair of stairs as an easy way to get rid of one's wife: "A politician did it." In the 19th century her story became very popular due to the best-selling novel, Kenilworth, by Walter Scott. The novel's arch-villain is again called Varney. The notion that Amy Robsart was murdered gained new strength with the discovery of the Spanish diplomatic correspondence (and with it of poison rumours) by the Victorian historian James Anthony Froude. Generally convinced of Leicester's wretchedness, he concluded in 1863: "she was murdered by persons who hoped to profit by his elevation to the throne; and Dudley himself … used private means … to prevent the search from being pressed inconveniently far." There followed the Norfolk antiquarian Walter Rye with The Murder of Amy Robsart in 1885: here she was first poisoned and then, that method failing, killed by violent means. Rye's main sources were Cecil's talk with de Quadra around the time of Amy Dudley's death and, again, Leicester's Commonwealth. Much more scholarly and influential was an 1870 work by George Adlard, Amy Robsart and the Earl of Leycester, which printed relevant letters and covertly suggested suicide as an explanation. By 1910, A.F. Pollard was convinced that the fact that Amy Robsart's death caused suspicion was "as natural as it was incredible … But a meaner intelligence than Elizabeth's or even Dudley's would have perceived that murder would make the[ir] marriage impossible."

=== Modern theories ===
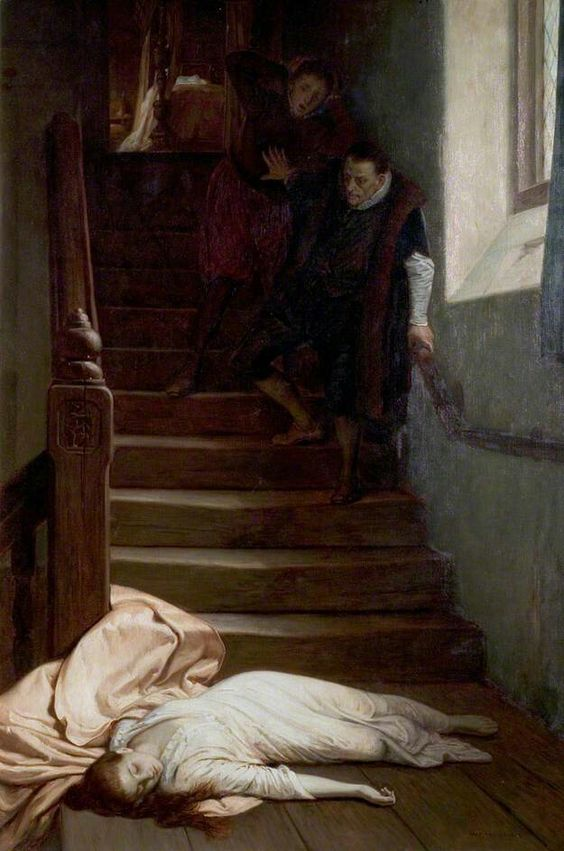
Amy Robsart, as imagined by William Frederick Yeames, 1877, Tate

The coroner's report came to light in The National Archives in 2008 and is compatible with an accidental fall as well as suicide or other violence. In the absence of the forensic findings of 1560, it was often assumed that a simple accident could not be the explanation—on the basis of near-contemporary tales that Amy Dudley was found at the bottom of a short flight of stairs with a broken neck, her headdress still standing undisturbed "upon her head", a detail that first appeared as a satirical remark in Leicester's Commonwealth and has ever since been repeated for a fact. To account for such oddities and evidence that she was ill, it was suggested in 1956 by Ian Aird, a professor of medicine, that Amy Dudley might have suffered from breast cancer, which through metastatic cancerous deposits in the spine, could have caused her neck to break under only limited strain, such as a short fall or even just coming down the stairs. This explanation has gained wide acceptance.

Another popular theory has been that Amy Dudley took her own life; because of illness or depression, her melancholy and "desperation" being traceable in some sources. As further arguments for suicide have been forwarded the fact that she insisted on sending her servants away and that her maid Picto, Thomas Blount, and perhaps Robert Dudley himself alluded to the possibility.

A few modern historians have considered murder as an option. Alison Weir has tentatively suggested William Cecil as organizer of Amy Dudley's death on the grounds that, if Amy was mortally ill, he had the strongest murder motive and that he was the main beneficiary of the ensuing scandal. Against this idea it has been argued that he would not have risked damaging Elizabeth's reputation nor his own position. The notion of Sir Richard Verney killing Amy Robsart after long and fruitless efforts to poison her (with and without his master's knowledge) has been revived by George Bernard and by Chris Skidmore on the basis that Verney appears in both the c. 1563 chronicle by John Hales (also called Journal of Matters of State) and the 1584 libel Leicester's Commonwealth. This coincidence has as often been evaluated as no more than a tradition of gossip, poison being a stock-in-trade accusation in the 16th century.

That Robert Dudley might have influenced the jury has been argued by George Bernard, Susan Doran, and by Chris Skidmore. The foreman, Sir Richard Smith (mayor of Abingdon in 1564/1565), had been a household servant of Princess Elizabeth and is described as a former "Queen's man" and a "lewd" person in Hales' 1563 chronicle, while Dudley gave a "Mr. Smith", also a "Queen's man", a present of some stuffs to make a gown from in 1566; six years after the inquest. It has, however, not been established that Sir Richard Smith and the "Mr. Smith" of 1566 are one and the same person, Smith being a "very common" name. Susan Doran has pointed out that any interference with the jury could be as easily explained by the desire to cover up a suicide rather than a murder.

Most modern historians have exonerated Robert Dudley from murder or a cover-up. Apart from alternatives for a murder plot as causes for Amy Robsart's death, his correspondence with Thomas Blount and William Cecil in the days following has been cited as proofs of his innocence; the letters, which show signs of an agitated mind, making clear his bewilderment and unpreparedness. It has also been judged as highly unlikely that he would have orchestrated the death of his wife in a manner which laid him open to such a foreseeable scandal.

== Family ==
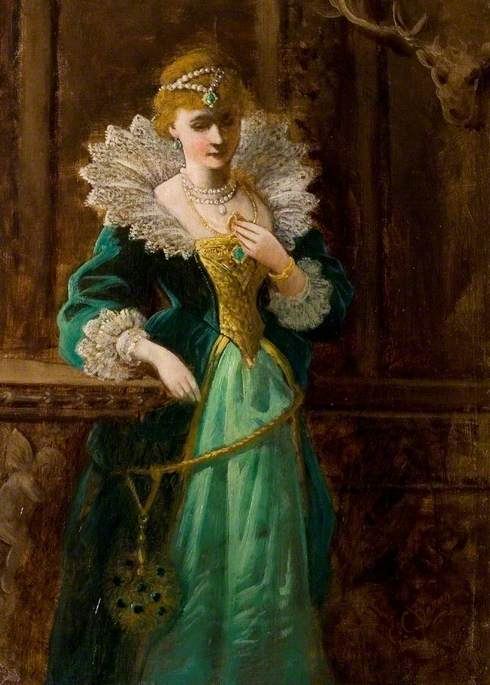
Amy Robsart, looking at the portrait of Leicester by E.C. Barnes. Fantasy portrait of Amy Robsart dressed in the colours of the Robsart coat of arms, green and yellow, or Vert and Or.

Amy Robsart was the daughter of Sir John Robsart of Syderstone and his wife, Elizabeth Scott, daughter of John Scott, of Camberwell in Surrey. From her mother's first marriage to Roger Appleyard of Stanfield Amy had four half-siblings, John Appleyard, Philip, who married Mary Shelton and was a Member of Parliament, Anne, who married James Bigos, esquire, Frances, who married William Flowerdew, and Bridget. Through their son Anthony Flowerdew of Hethersett in Norfolk and his wife Martha Stanley of Scottow in Norfolk, Amy Robsart is the great-aunt of Temperance Flowerdew.

Amy Robsart's paternal grandparents were Theoderick (Terry) Robsart and Elizabeth, daughter of Sir Thomas Kerdeston of Syderstone.

Her half-brother Arthur Robsart was the illegitimate son of her father Sir John Robsart, and married Margaret, daughter of Sir Arthur Hopton.

== Memorial ==
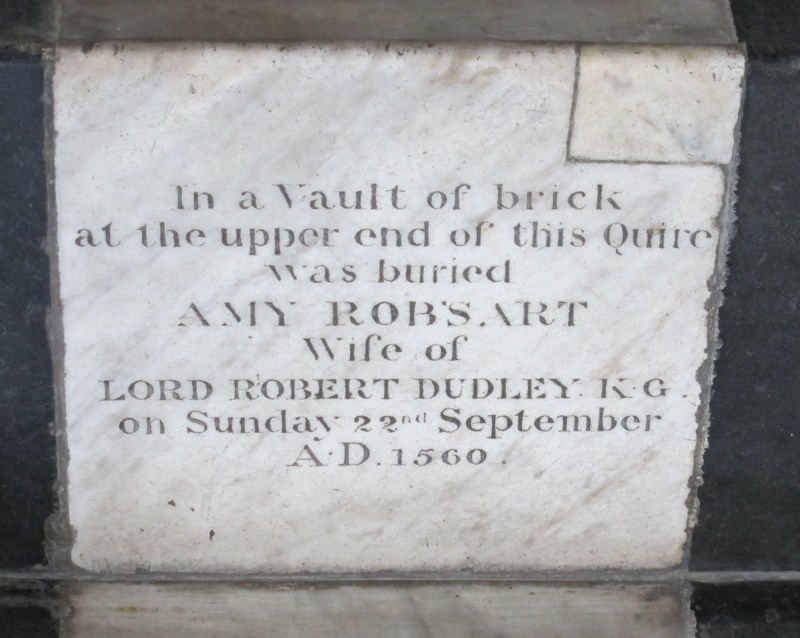
Floor slab to Amy Robsart, wife of Robert Dudley, in the University Church of St Mary the Virgin in the High Street, Oxford.

Amy was buried in the chancel of the University Church of St Mary the Virgin in the High Street, Oxford, but her grave has been lost. Professor Ian Aird wrote: "The exact site of Amy’s grave has never been known, though in the contemporary account it was said to have been at the east end of the church of St. Mary the Virgin in Oxford."

A memorial slab in the church floor, added much later, says:

In a Vault of brick at the upper end of this Quire was buried Amy Robsart Wife of Lord Robert Dudley K.G. on Sunday 22nd September AD 1560

== In later culture ==
Scott's Kenilworth in 1821 brought a huge revival of interest in Amy's story. In the novel she is murdered by Leicester's henchmen as part of an extended plot, and she became an iconic tragic heroine for 19th-century Britain, along with her sister-in-law Lady Jane Grey (executed in 1554) and Mary, Queen of Scots (executed in 1587).

There were numerous adaptations of the novel, as plays, musicals, operas and in ballet, in both Europe and the Americas. Some of these were actually titled Amy Robsart, as with a very successful play by Andrew Halliday, which premiered at the Theatre Royal, Drury Lane in London in 1870. A new spate of imaginary paintings came in the decades following this.

In the 1820s, soon after the novel, Victor Hugo's first play, Amy Robsart (1828) was a flop, despite costumes designed by Eugène Delacroix, but the libretto of Gaetano Donizetti's 1829 opera Il castello di Kenilworth drew from Hugo's version of the story. Other operas called Amy Robsart are by Isidore de Lara in 1893, and Alfredo Schiuma's in 1920. But these were mainly before World War One, and the novel has apparently never been filmed, except for a BBC television series that is lost. However, Amy is a character in the 2022 series Becoming Elizabeth, played by Ruby Ashbourne Serkis, appearing in the last three episodes.

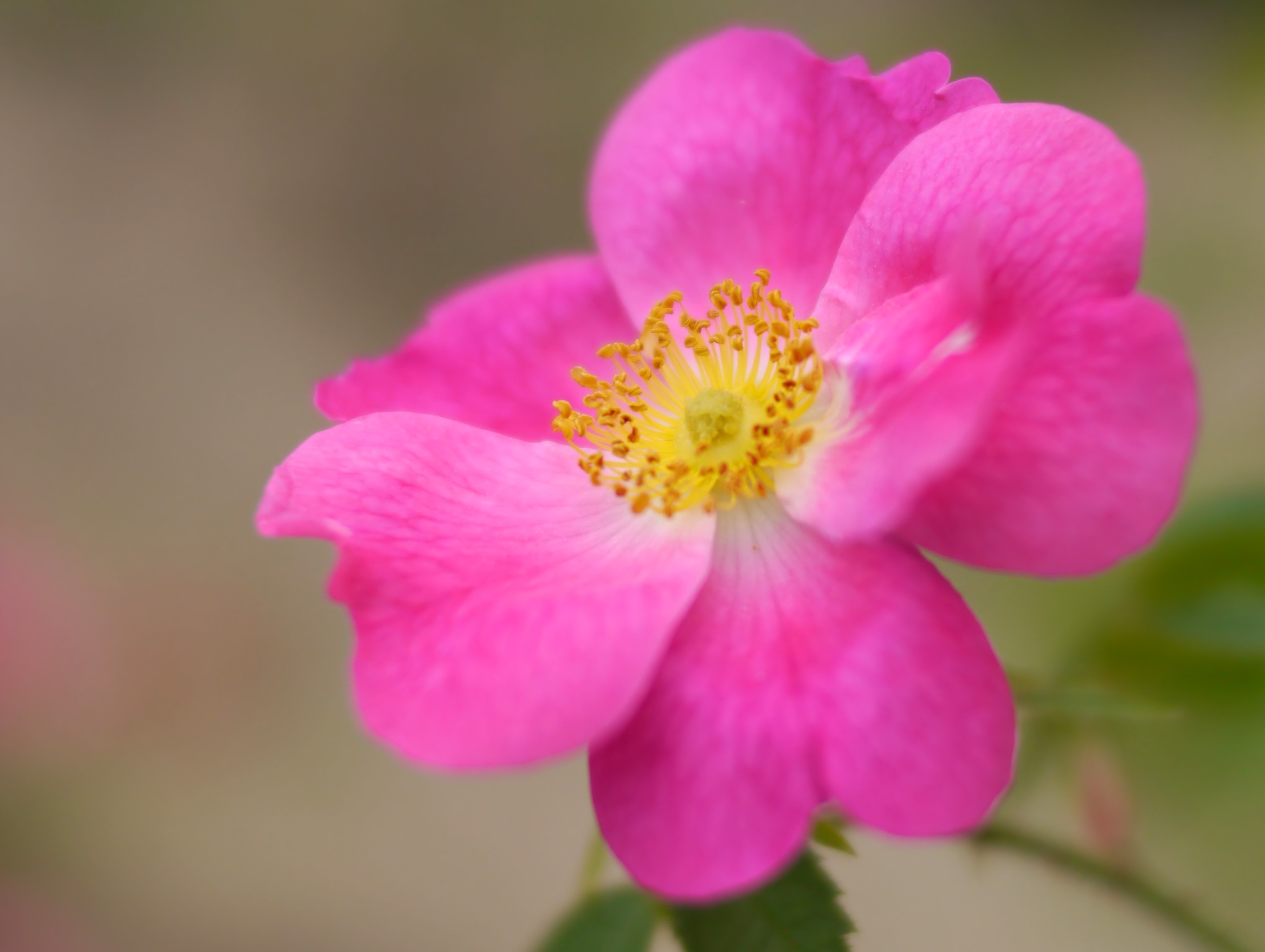
Rosa Amy Robsart

Robsart, Saskatchewan was named after Amy by the Canadian Pacific Railway in 1910; they owned the plot on which a village was later built. The settlement declined during the Great Depression and is now home to only a handful of residents; 20 in the 2016 census.

Robsart, New Mexico in Lincoln County, New Mexico has a similar history; it is on the Southern Pacific Railroad and is now a ghost town.

A pink-flowered hybrid English "sweet briar" (Rosa rubiginosa) rose cultivar called Amy Robsart was introduced by the 1890s, and remains in cultivation. It was bred in Godalming by the judge James Wilde, 1st Baron Penzance who in the 1890s bred a series of roses, the "Penzance Hybrids", named after characters from Walter Scott.

== See also ==
- Cultural depictions of Elizabeth I of England
- List of unsolved deaths
