= Richard Barningham =

Richard Barningham was an English academic during the 16th-century: he was Master of Balliol from 1504 to 1511.
