= Henry Henshaw (academic) =

Oxford College Head and Academic

Henry Henshaw was an Oxford college head in the 16th-century.

Henshaw graduated BA in 1543, MA in 1546 and BD in 1557. He was Rector of Lincoln College, Oxford, from 1558 until 1560.
