= Adam Squire =

English churchman and academic (died 1588)

Adam Squire or Squier (died 1588) was an English churchman and academic, Master of Balliol College, Oxford, from 1571 to 1580, and Archdeacon of Middlesex from 1577.

== Life ==
Squire graduated B.A. at Balliol College in 1560, and became a Fellow that year, graduating M.A. in 1564. He became vicar of Cumnor in 1568, and accumulated other preferments, being canon of St Paul's Cathedral in 1577.

Squire's suspicions of Robert Persons were instrumental in forcing Persons, who was Dean of Balliol College, to resign his fellowship in 1574. They had clashed when Persons was Senior Bursar in 1572–73. Squire had an ally among the Fellows in Christopher Bagshaw.

Squire himself had a reputation for dealings with the supernatural. It was alleged against him by Persons that he sold familiar spirits, in the form of a fly, to gamblers; or, in the term "dycing flies", the word fly was then a synonym for familiar. The charge came close to losing Squire his post as Master. Richard Harvey, in defending his own practice of astrology, mentioned Squire among other academics as sympathetic to it. According to Balliofergus he was "a great Mathematician".

Squire embezzled a legacy given to the college. Around 1580 he was paid off by the Jesuit George Gilbert to turn a blind eye to the development of a Catholic association of young men in the area (Farringdon Without) of Chancery Lane or Fetter Lane. In 1588, the year of the Spanish Armada, and also his death, he was given custody of a leading recusant, Walter Fowler.

== Family ==
Squire married a daughter of John Aylmer, the bishop of London to whom he was personal chaplain, by 1587. Their son, John, was a Cambridge graduate, and became vicar of St Leonard's, Shoreditch.

John Strype relates that Squire preached his own wedding sermon, that he was unfaithful to his wife, and that Squire fabricated an affair she was having. Finding out about this, his father-in-law the bishop "cudgelled" him. Further, he ran up debts, and his estate was put into administration. John Squire was brought up by Theophilus Aylmer, son of the bishop.
