= Joseph Hunt (priest) =

Joseph Hunt D.D. (b Kingsclere 16 March 1681 - d Astrop 15 March 1726) was Master of Balliol College, Oxford from 1722 until his death.

Davey graduated B.A. from Balliol in 1700; M.A. in 1703; and B.D. in 1718. He was ordained into the Church of England in 1705; and held Livings at Nether Stowey and Fillingham.
