= John Venn (academic) =

English academic administrator

John Venn D.D. (died 8 October 1687) was an English academic administrator at the University of Oxford.

Venn was elected Master (head) of Balliol College, Oxford on 24 April 1678, a post he held until his death in 1687. During his time as Master of Balliol, he was also Vice-Chancellor of Oxford University from 1686 until 1687.

Academic offices
Preceded by Thomas Goode	Master of Balliol College, Oxford; 1678–1687	Succeeded by Roger Mander
Preceded by Timothy Halton	Vice-Chancellor of Oxford University; 1686–1687	Succeeded by Gilbert Ironside
