= Henry Savage =

English clergyman, academic and controversialist

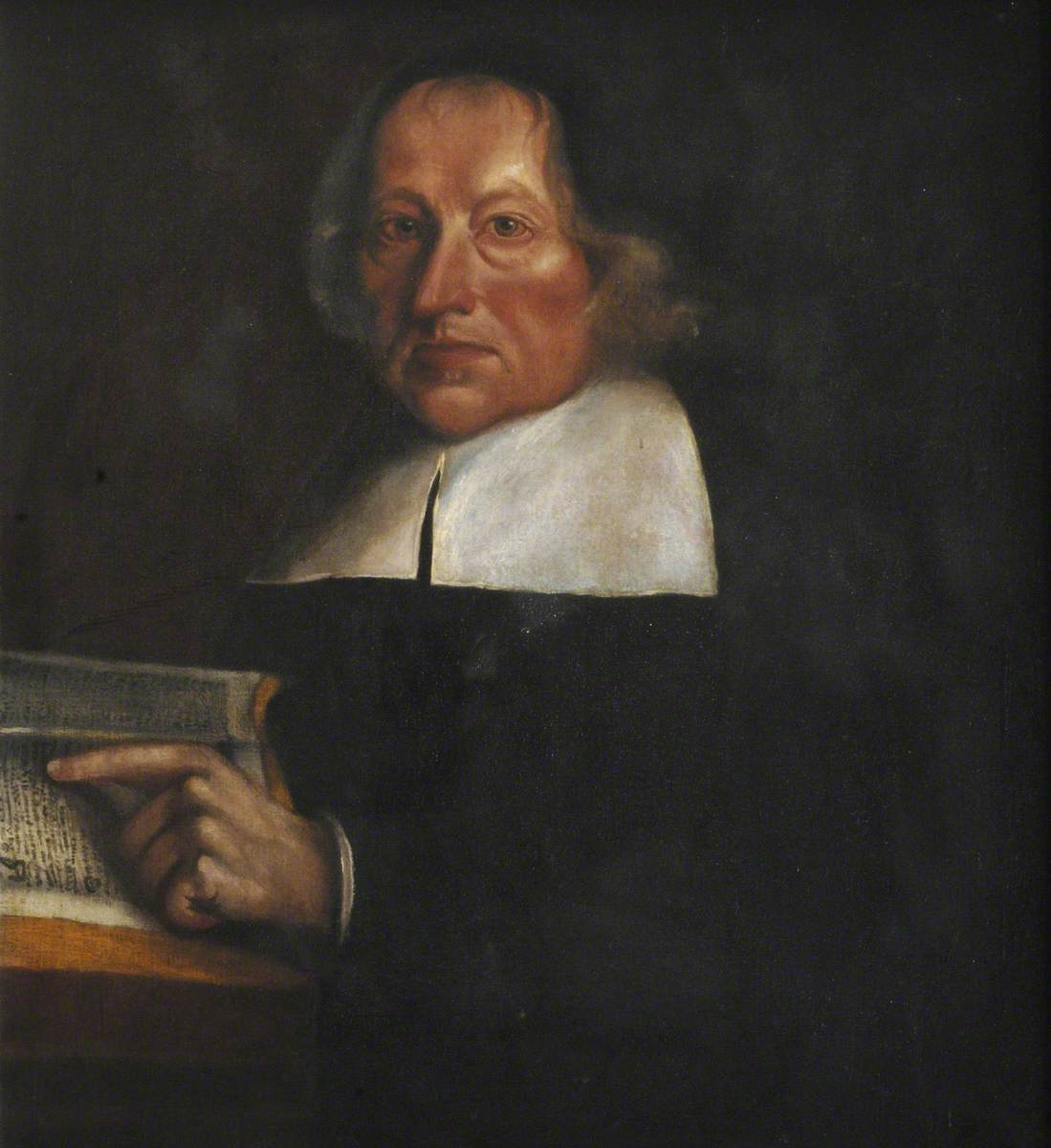
Henry Savage

Henry Savage (1604? – 1672) was an English clergyman, academic and controversialist, Master of Balliol College, Oxford, from 1651.

== Life ==
He was the son of Francis Savage of Dobs Hill in the parish of Eldersfield or Eldsfield, Worcestershire. He entered as a commoner of Balliol in 1621 at the age of seventeen, but did not matriculate till 11 March 1625. He graduated B. A. 24 November 1625, M.A. 4 February 1630, and B.D. 8 November 1637. He was elected fellow of his college in 1628. About 1640 he travelled in France with William Sandys, 6th Baron Sandys.

Savage submitted to the parliamentary visitors of the University of Oxford; and was presented to the rectory and vicarage of Sherborne St. John, Hampshire, in 1648. He was recalled to Oxford by his election, on 20 February 1651, to succeed George Bradshaw as master of Balliol, then one of the poorest and smallest colleges, and proceeded to the degree of D.D. on 16 October following; his dissertations on infant baptism were published in 1653, and provoked an answer from John Tombes of Magdalen Hall, to which Savage replied in 1655. His opinions were orthodox, and at the Restoration he was given the post of chaplain-in-ordinary to Charles II, and the rectory of Bladon, near Woodstock, in 1661, in addition to the rectory of Fillingham, Lincolnshire, which he held as Master, a canonry at Gloucester in 1665, and the rectory of Crowmarsh, Oxfordshire, in 1670. He died on 2 June 1672, and was buried in the college chapel.

== Works ==
Savage published:

- 'Tres Quaestiones Theologicae in Comitiorum Vesperiis Oxon. discussae an. 1652, viz., An Psedobaptismus sit licitus,' Oxford, 1653.
- 'Thesis doctoris Savage, nempe Paedobaptismum esse licitum, Confirmatio, contra Refutationem Mri. Tombes nuper editam,' concluding with a 'Vindicatio eius a Calumniis Mri. Tombes,' Oxford, 1655.
- 'Reasons showing that there is no need of such Reformation of the public Doctrine, Worship, Rites and Ceremonies, Church Government, and Discipline as is pretended,' London, 1660; this is an answer to a pamphlet of 'Reasons showing that there is need,' &c., attributed to Cornelius Burges.
- 'The Dew of Hermon which fell upon the Hill of Sion, or an Answer to a Book entitl'd "Sion's Groans,"' London, 1663; some copies are called 'Toleration, with its Principal Objections fully Confuted, or an Answer.'
- 'Balliofergus, or a Commentary upon the Foundation, Founders, and Affairs of Balliol College, Oxford,' 1668, a small quarto of 130 pages, including 'Natalitia Collegii Pembrochiani Oxonii 1624;' the first attempt to construct the history of an Oxford college on the basis of authentic registers and deeds, it was criticised as inaccurate.

== Family ==
Savage married, about 1655, Mary, daughter of Colonel Henry Sandys, 5th Baron Sandys and sister of his friend William, sixth lord Sandys, and of Henry and Edwin, seventh and eighth barons. He had seven children. Savage's widow died, 15 May 1683, in an obscure house in St. Ebbe's at Oxford.
