= Thomas Laurence =

English churchman and academic

Thomas Laurence (1598–1657) was an English churchman and academic, Lady Margaret Professor of Divinity and expelled Master of Balliol College, Oxford.

== Life ==
He was born in Dorset, the son of a clergyman. He obtained a scholarship at Balliol College, Oxford, in 1614, when only sixteen, and matriculated 11 May 1615. Before 1618 he was elected a fellow of All Souls' College, and graduated B.A. on 9 June 1618, M.A. on 16 May 1621, B.D. 1629, and D.D. 1633. He incorporated M.A. at Cambridge in 1627. On 31 January 1629 he was made treasurer of Lichfield Cathedral, and held the post of private chaplain to William Herbert, 3rd Earl of Pembroke.

At Oxford he was noted for his knowledge of scholastic philosophy and theology. By William Laud's influence he became chaplain to Charles I, and was elected on 11 November 1637 Master of Balliol. On 20 March 1638 he received, in succession to Samuel Fell, the Margaret professorship of divinity, to which chair a Worcester canonry was then attached. Laud, writing on the occasion, advised him to be 'mindful of the waspishness of these times.' Laurence also held the living of Bemerton with Fugglestone in Wiltshire. During Laud's trial Laurence was instanced as one "popishly affected" whom Laud had promoted.

The parliamentary visitors compelled him in 1648 to resign his mastership and professorship in order to avoid expulsion, but he afterwards submitted to them, and received a certificate, dated 3 August 1648, attesting that he engaged to preach only practical divinity, and to forbear from expressing any opinions condemned by the reformed church. His Wiltshire benefice was sequestrated before 1653. Dismissed from Oxford with the loss of everything, he was appointed chaplain of Colne, Huntingdonshire, by the parliamentarian, Colonel Valentine Walker, whose release Laurence had brought about when the colonel was imprisoned by the royalists at Oxford. Charles II appointed him to an Irish bishopric, but he was never consecrated, dying on 10 December 1657.

== Theology ==
During the 1630s, Laurence defended Arminian theological views through his writings.

== Works ==
He published three sermons:

- The Duty of the Laity and Privilege of the Clergy, preached at St. Mary's in Oxon. on 13 July 1634, Oxford, 1635.
- Of Schism in the Church of God, preached in the Cathedral Church at Sarum, at the visitation of Will. Archbishop of Canterbury, on 23 May 1634, on 1 Cor. i. 12, Oxford, 1630.
- Sermon before the King's Majesty at Whitehall on 7 February 1636, on Exod. iii. 5.

== Notes and references ==
- This article incorporates text from a publication now in the public domain: "Laurence, Thomas". Dictionary of National Biography. London: Smith, Elder & Co. 1885–1900.

=== Sources ===
- Tyacke, Nicholas (2001). Aspects of English Protestantism C. 1530-1700. Manchester: University Press.
