= Nathaniel Brent =

English college head

Sir Nathaniel Brent (c. 1573 – 6 November 1652) was an English college head.

== Life ==
He was the son of Anchor Brent of Little Wolford, Warwickshire, where he was born about 1573. He became 'portionist,' or postmaster, of Merton College, Oxford, in 1589; proceeded B.A. on 20 June 1593; was admitted probationer fellow there in 1594, and took the degree of M.A. on 31 October 1598. He was proctor of the university in 1607, and admitted bachelor of law on 11 October 1623.

In 1613 and 1614 he travelled abroad, securing the Italian text of the History of the Council of Trent which he was to translate. In 1616, he was in the Hague with Dudley Carleton, ambassador there, who wrote about Brent's ambitions to Ralph Winwood. Soon after the close of his foreign tour Brent married Martha, the daughter and heiress of Robert Abbot, Bishop of Salisbury, and niece of George Abbot, Archbishop of Canterbury.

The influence of the Abbots secured Brent's election in 1622 to the wardenship of Merton College, in succession to Sir Henry Savile. He was afterwards appointed commissary of the diocese of Canterbury, and vicar-general to the archbishop, and on Sir Henry Marten's death became judge of the prerogative court. During the early years of William Laud's primacy (1634–7), Brent made a tour through England south of the Trent, acting for the archbishop in his metropolitical visitation of the province of Canterbury, reporting upon and correcting ecclesiastical abuses.

He had a house of his own in Little Britain, London and was often absent from Merton. On 23 August 1629 he was knighted at Woodstock by Charles I of England, who was preparing to pay a state visit to Oxford. In August 1636, Brent presented Prince Charles and Prince Rupert for degrees, when Laud, who had become Chancellor of the University of Oxford in 1630, was entertaining the royal family.

In 1638 Laud held a visitation of Merton College, and insisted on many radical reforms. Laud stayed at the college for many weeks, and found Brent an obstinate opponent. Charges of maladministration were brought against Brent by some of those whom Laud examined, but he took no public proceedings against Brent on these grounds. His letters to the warden are, however, couched in very haughty and decisive language. The tenth charge in the indictment drawn up Laud in 1641 treats of the unlawful authority exercised by him at Merton in 1638. Brent came forward as a hostile witness at Laud's trial. His testimony as to Laud's intimacy with papists and the like was damaging to the archbishop, but it did not add to his own reputation. Laud replied in writing to Brent's accusations.

On the outbreak of the First English Civil War Brent sided with Parliament. Before Charles I entered Oxford (29 October 1642), he had abandoned Oxford for London. On 27 January 1645 Charles I wrote to the remaining Fellows at Merton that Brent was deposed from his office on the grounds of his having absented himself for three years from the college, of having adhered to the rebels, and of having accepted the office of judge-marshal in their ranks. He had also signed the Solemn League and Covenant. The petition for the formal removal of Brent, to which the king's letter was an answer, was drawn up by John Greaves, Savilian professor of geometry. On 9 April, William Harvey was elected to fill Brent's place: but as soon as Oxford fell into the hands of Thomas Fairfax, the parliamentary general (24 June 1646), Brent returned to Merton, and apparently resumed his post there without any opposition being offered him.

In 1647, Brent was appointed president of the parliamentary commission, or visitation, ordered by Parliament "for the correction of offences, abuses, and disorders" in the University of Oxford. The proceedings began on 3 June, but it was not until 30 September that the colleges were directed to forward to Merton their statutes, registers, and accounts to enable Brent and his colleagues to set to work. On 12 April 1648, Brent presented four of the visitors for the degree of M.A. Early in May of the same year Brent spoke for Anthony à Wood's retention of his postmastership in spite of his avowed royalism. Wood wrote that he owed this favour to the intercession of his mother, whom Brent had known from a girl.

On 17 May 1649, Fairfax and Oliver Cromwell paid the university a threatening visit, and malcontents were thenceforth proceeded against by the commission with rigour. But Brent grew dissatisfied with its proceedings. The visitors claimed to rule Merton College as they pleased, and, without consulting the Warden, they admitted fellows, Masters, and Bachelors of Arts. On 13 February 1651, he sent a petition of protest against the conduct of the visitors to parliament. The commissioners were ordered to answer Brent's complaint, but there is no evidence that they did so, and, in October 1651, Brent retired from the commission. On 27 November, following he resigned his office of Warden, nominally in obedience to an order forbidding pluralities, but his refusal to sign 'the engagement,' a statement of loyalty, was a probable cause of his resignation. Brent afterwards withdrew to his house in London, and died there on 6 November 1652. He was buried in St Bartholomew-the-Less.

== Works ==
In 1620 he translated into English the History of the Council of Trent by Pietro Soave Polano (i.e. Paolo Sarpi). A second edition appeared in 1629, and another in 1676, Archbishop Abbot had caused the Latin original to be published for the first time in 1619 in London.

In 1625, asked by George Abbot, he republished the defence of the church of England Vindiciae Ecclesiae Anglicanae, first published in 1613 by Francis Mason, archdeacon of Norfolk.

== Family ==
Brent's daughter Margaret married Edward Corbet of Merton College, a presbyterian, on whom Laud repeatedly refused to confer the living of Chartham.

Academic offices
Preceded by Henry Savile	Warden of Merton College, Oxford; 1625–1645	Succeeded by William Harvey
Preceded by William Harvey	Warden of Merton College, Oxford; 1648–1651	Succeeded by Jonathan Goddard
