= John Parkhurst (disambiguation) =

John Parkhurst (c. 1512–1575) was an English bishop of the 16th century.

John Parkhurst may also refer to:

- John Parkhurst (Master of Balliol) (1564–1639), English cleric and academic
- John Parkhurst (MP) (1643–1741), English politician, MP for Northamptonshire, Brackley and Durham City
- John Parkhurst (lexicographer) (1728–1797), English academic, clergyman and biblical scholar
- John Adelbert Parkhurst (1861–1925), American astronomer
- John C. Parkhurst (1920-2009), American lawyer and politician
- John Gibson Parkhurst (1824–1906), officer in the Union Army during the American Civil War and later diplomat
