= Peter Smart =

Peter Smart (1569–1652?) was an Anglican Puritan clergyman, kept imprisoned for 12 years after he preached against innovations in the ceremonies at Durham Cathedral.

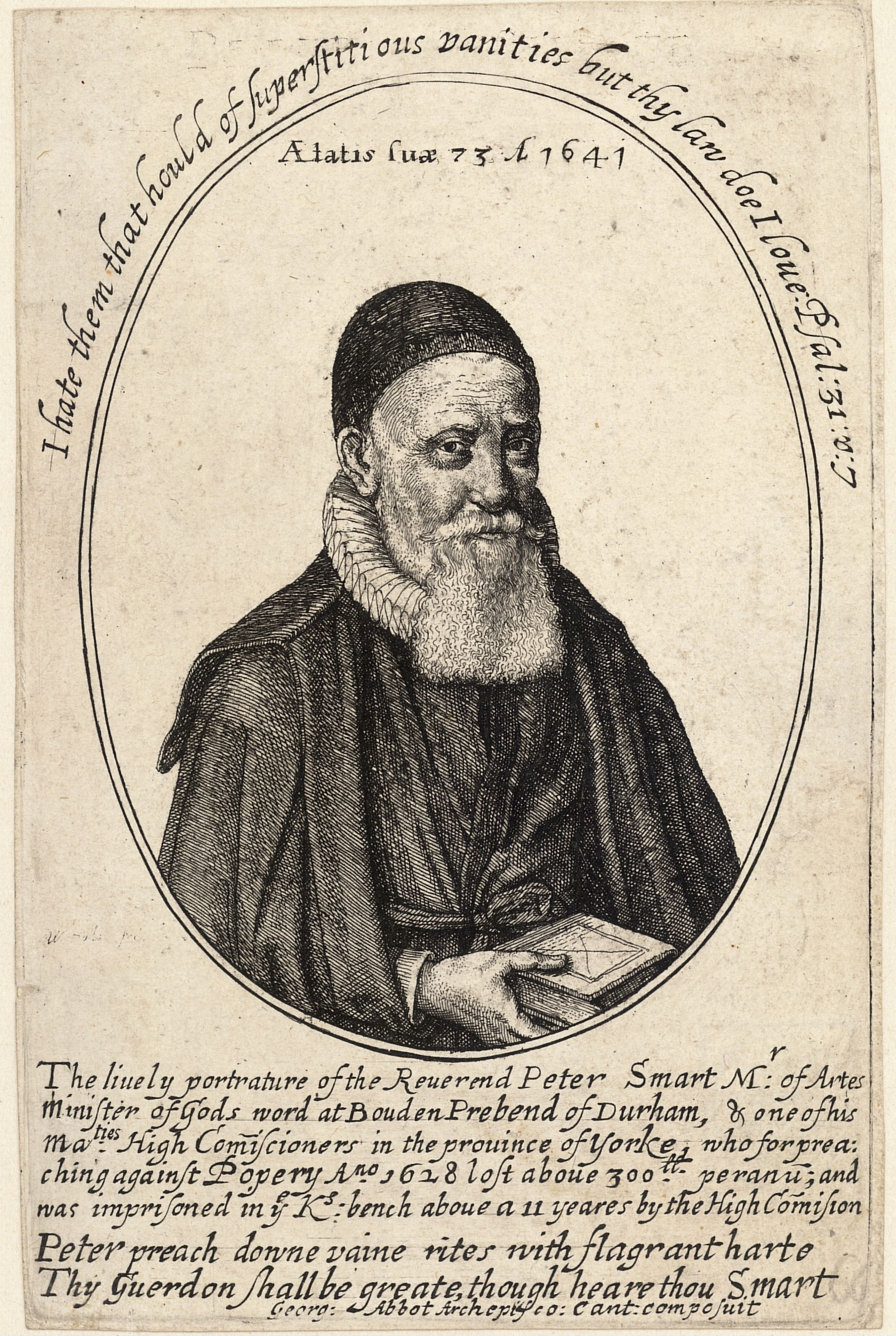
Peter Smart in an engraving by Wenceslas Hollar, with a couplet attributed to George Abbot.

== Life ==
He was born at Lighthorne, Warwickshire, the son of a clergyman William Smart (Daniel Smart, presented in 1624 to the rectory of Oxhill, Warwickshire being a brother). He was educated at Westminster School under Gabriel Goodman and Edward Grant, with Richard Neile. On 25 October 1588, aged 19, he matriculated as a batler (poor scholar) at Broadgates Hall, Oxford and was elected (before April 1589) to a studentship at Christ Church, Oxford where he wrote some Latin verse, and commenced B.A. 26 June 1592, M.A. 9 July 1595.

William James, promoted in 1596 from Dean of Christ Church to Dean of Durham, appointed Smart in 1598 to the mastership of Durham Grammar School. James, when he became bishop of Durham (1606), ordained Smart, made him his chaplain, and gave him the rectory of Boldon, co. Durham in 1609, with a prebend at Durham Cathedral. At some time before 1610 Smart was made master of St. Edmund's Hospital, Gateshead. He was present when James I communicated at Durham on Easter Day (20 April 1617), and noted the ceremonial details: by royal order there was no chanting or organ-playing; two plain copes were worn.

Smart refrained from attending communions at Durham Cathedral, citing his reason as Richard Neile, the new bishop of Durham from 1617, who had introduced ceremonial changes such as altars and embroidered copes. In 1626, and again in 1627, he was placed on the high commission for the province of York, and was a member of it when he was summoned for 'a seditious invective sermon'. The renovation of the cathedral and enrichment of the service had drawn from Smart on Sunday morning, 27 July 1628, a sermon (on Psalms xxxi. 7). It was published 1628, and reprinted at Edinburgh the same year, as The Vanitie and Downefall of Superstitious Popish Ceremonies, and again in 1640 with an appended Narrative of the Acts and Speeches ... of Mr. John Cosins.

A quorum of the high commission commenced proceedings against Smart. John Cosin, a particular target in the sermon and a leader in the group of Neile's chaplains and prebendaries pushing for more "high church" ceremonial, was one of his judges. On 2 September the commissioners suspended Smart, and sequestered his prebend. On 29 January 1629 the case was transmitted to the high commission of the province of Canterbury, sitting at Lambeth, Smart was held in custody, and his sermon (now in print) was burned. He had influential friends: Sir Henry Yelverton admired his sermon, and Archbishop George Abbot is said to have agreed on the ceremonies. But his bitterness before the commission harmed him. On his own petition, he was removed back (August 1630) to the high commission at York. In the end for contumacy he was in 1631 degraded, and fined. Refusing to pay the fine, he was sent to the King's Bench Prison. Friends raised £400 a year to support him and his family.

On 3 November 1640, having been close on twelve years in custody, he drew up a petition (presented 12 November) to the Long Parliament for his release. The Commons resolved (22 January 1641) that his sentence was illegal and void, and directed the prosecution of Cosin. In his Short Treatise (1641), Smart charged Cosin with "unseemly" words and actions. Francis Rous, in his speech of 16 March 1641 impeaching Cosin, styled Smart "a Proto-Martyr."

Smart recovered his preferments and up to 1648 he was suing for arrears. He took the Solemn League and Covenant in 1643, and gave evidence at the trial of William Laud (1644). In 1645 he obtained, in place of Thomas Gawen, the sequestered rectory of Bishopstoke, Hampshire, and in 1646 he had, or claimed to have, the sequestered vicarage of Great Aycliffe, co. Durham.

He was living in London on 31 October 1648. Christopher Hunter heard that he died at Baxterwood, an outlying hamlet in the parish of St. Oswald, Durham, but failed find a record of his death, which probably took place in 1652.

== Works ==
He published, besides the sermon of 1628:

- The Humble Petition of Peter Smart, a poore Prisoner in the King's Bench, [1640?];
- A Short Treatise of Altars, Altar-fumiture, (probably printed 1641, but written 1628);
- A Catalogue of Superstitious Innovations . . . Violations of the locall Statutes of Durham Cathedrall, 1642;
- Septugenarii Senis iterantis Cantus Epithalamicus, 1643 (dedicated to the Westminster Assembly).
