= John Herne =

English barrister

John Herne (c.1593–1649) was an English barrister, involved in high-profile trials of the 1630s and 1640s.

== Life ==
Herne has been identified as the John Heron who matriculated at Clare College, Cambridge in 1608. He was admitted a student at Lincoln's Inn on 21 January 1611, and was called to the bar there. On 5 March 1628 he was returned to parliament for Newport (Cornwall), but was unseated on petition.

In 1632 Herne defended Henry Sherfield in his trial in the Star-chamber for defacing a stained-glass window in St. Edmund's Church, Salisbury. He was also counsel for William Prynne on his trial for the publication of Histrio-Mastix in February 1634, and for the warden of the Fleet Prison before a commission which sat to investigate alleged abuses in the management there, in March 1635. In 1637 he was elected a bencher of his inn, and was Lent reader there in the following year. In 1641 he was one of the counsel for Sir John Bramston the elder and Sir Robert Berkeley, two of the judges impeached by the Long parliament over ship money. He has been tentatively identified as the Mr. Herne who defended Sir Richard Gurney, 1st Baronet in 1642.

Herne was assigned 23 October 1641 to defend the bishops impeached for issuing the new canons of 1640; but declined to act on the ground that as a commoner he was "involved in all the acts and votes of the House of Commons". He was also one of the defence counsel in the impeachment of Archbishop Laud. He delivered a learned and eloquent speech for the defence on 11 October 1644, which was supposed at the time to have been composed by Matthew Hale, another of Laud's counsel. The gist of the argument was that no one of the articles of the impeachment was sufficient by itself to ground a charge of high treason, and that therefore the totality of them could not do so any more than, as Herne put it, "two hundred couple of black rabbits would make a black horse".

After the trial was over Herne visited Laud in the Tower of London, brought him his prayer-book, which was in Prynne's hands, and was consulted by him about his speech on the scaffold.

== Works ==
The Learned Reading of John Herne, Esq., late of the Honourable Society of Lincoln's Inne, upon the Statute of 23 H. 8, cap. 3, concerning Commissions of Sewers. Translated out of the French Manuscript was published after his death, London, 1659.

== Family ==
In 1618 Herne married Susanna Woodward, daughter of the London merchant John Woodward. Another John Herne (fl. 1660), who appears to have been their son, and the translator of the Reading, entered Lincoln's Inn on 11 February 1636. He published:

- a collection of precedents called The Pleader, London, 1657;
- The Law of Conveyances, London, 1658;
- The Modern Assurancer, 1658; and
- The Law of Charitable Uses, London, 1660.

== Notes ==
Attribution

This article incorporates text from a publication now in the public domain: Stephen, Leslie; Lee, Sidney, eds. (1891). "Herne, John". Dictionary of National Biography. Vol. 26. London: Smith, Elder & Co.
