= Robert Abbot (bishop) =

Bishop of Salisbury

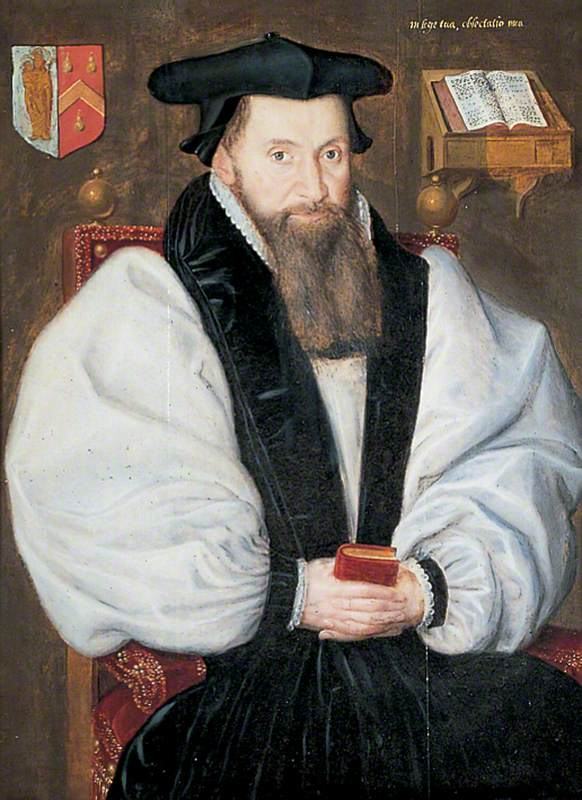
Robert Abbot

Robert Abbot (1560 – 2 March 1618) was an Anglican bishop, academic and polemical writer. He served as Master of Balliol College, Oxford, Regius Professor of Divinity, and Bishop of Salisbury from 1615. Among his four younger brothers, George became Archbishop of Canterbury and Maurice became Lord Mayor of London.

== Life ==
He was born in Guildford, the elder brother of George Abbot the future archbishop. Both brothers were educated at the Royal Grammar School, Guildford, and Balliol College, Oxford. He early distinguished himself as a preacher, and a sermon which he preached at Paul's Cross gained for him the living of Bingham, Nottinghamshire, to which he was presented by John Stanhope.

King James appointed Abbot one of the chaplains in ordinary. In 1609, he was elected master of Balliol College. In 1613 he became Regius Professor of Divinity at Oxford and attacked the writings of Petrus Bertius, a Dutch Remonstrant, on the topic of falling from grace. Subsequently, he made a broader attack based on orthodox Calvinism and Augustine of Hippo on the spreading ideas of Jacobus Arminius. In 1615 he attacked John Howson and William Laud, implying Catholic sympathies, and wrapping in those terms the further implication that Laud was Arminian. Howson retorted that Abbot and his brother George were both Puritans. In speaking of secret methods by which certain persons were attempting to undermine the Protestant Reformation, Abbot was clearly referencing Laud, who was present for the lecture. Laud, stung, wrote to his friend Richard Neile, Bishop of Lincoln, complaining that "he was fain to sit patiently at the rehearsal of this sermon, though abused almost an hour together, being pointed at as he sat" and asking whether he ought to take public notice of the insult.

Abbot obtained the see of Salisbury and his brother George consecrated him as bishop. On his departure from the university, he delivered a farewell oration in Latin which was much admired. Comparing the merits of the two Abbot brothers, Thomas Fuller remarks that

George was the more plausible preacher, Robert the greater scholar; George was the abler statesman, Robert the deeper divine.

Abbot died in Salisbury, being one of five bishops who succeeded to the see of Salisbury within the space of six years.

== Works ==
Abbot's writings were mainly against the Roman Catholic Church; he also attacked Arminianism.

In 1594, Abbot appeared as a writer with A Mirror of Popish Subtilties (1594) which was designed as a refutation of the arguments advanced by Nicholas Sander and Robert Bellarmine against the Protestant theory of the sacraments. The occasion for this work was a disputation in which Abbot had been involved, with a Marian Father Paul Spence who was being held prisoner in Worcester Castle. Antichristi Demonstratio [A Demonstration of Antichrist] (1603), was against Bellarmine once more. It was admired by the new king James I, who ordered material from his own Paraphrase on the Apocalypse to be printed with it in a second edition of 1608. Abbot was concerned to refute Bellarmine's reading of the Book of Revelation as literal and innovative (by comparison with the tradition of Nicholas of Lyra on Revelation 13), and to attack what would be identified later as the futurist approach in the tradition of Francisco Ribera. Abbot's own reading was typically historicist and concerned to argue for the Pope as Antichrist.

His A Defence of the Reformed Catholic of Mr. William Perkins (3 vols, 1606–1609), won Abbot royal favour and a promise of preferment. It was an intervention defending the late William Perkins from an attack by the Catholic priest William Bishop. The work responded to a royal commission and prompting from Richard Bancroft, and in the first part covered the ground of the Gunpowder Plot. Abbot in the main argument of the Defence indicates his Puritan sympathies by deriving the true tradition of the Early Christian Church through the Albigensians, Lollards, Huguenots, and contemporary Calvinists. In the concluding part Abbot drew "the true ancient Roman Catholike" as he himself conceived the character. He dedicated the book to Henry Frederick, Prince of Wales, who promised that Abbot should not be forgotten. Abbot returned to the theme of the Plot in his Antilogia (1613), defending the condemnation of Henry Garnet. It used both state papers and scurrility; taking the form of a reply to the Jesuit Eudæmon Joannes, it was later considered by David Jardine to be the major historical work of its period on the Plot.

A course of anti-Catholic lectures, read in his college, was published after his death as On the King's Supremacy. He wrote several commentaries on the scriptures which were not printed; among these is a Latin commentary on the Epistle to the Romans, in four volumes folio. Abbot's manuscripts passed to the Bodleian Library by his grandson.

== Family ==
Abbot was twice married. By his first wife Abbot had sons and a daughter Martha, who was married to Sir Nathaniel Brent; their daughter Margaret Brent was married to Edward Corbet, rector of Great Haseley, and the latter presented some of the bishop's manuscripts to the Bodleian Library. His second wife was the widow Bridget Cheynell, mother of Francis Cheynell. This second marriage is said to have displeased his brother, the archbishop, who regarded it as an infringement of the apostolic injunction that a bishop should be the husband of one wife.

== Notes ==
Academic offices
Preceded by Edmund Lilly	Master of Balliol College, Oxford; 1610–1616	Succeeded by John Parkhurst
Preceded by Thomas Holland	Regius Professor of Divinity at Oxford; 1612–1615	Succeeded by John Prideaux
Church of England titles
Preceded by Henry Cotton	Bishop of Salisbury; 1615–1618	Succeeded by Martin Fotherby
