= Holy Trinity Church, Guildford =

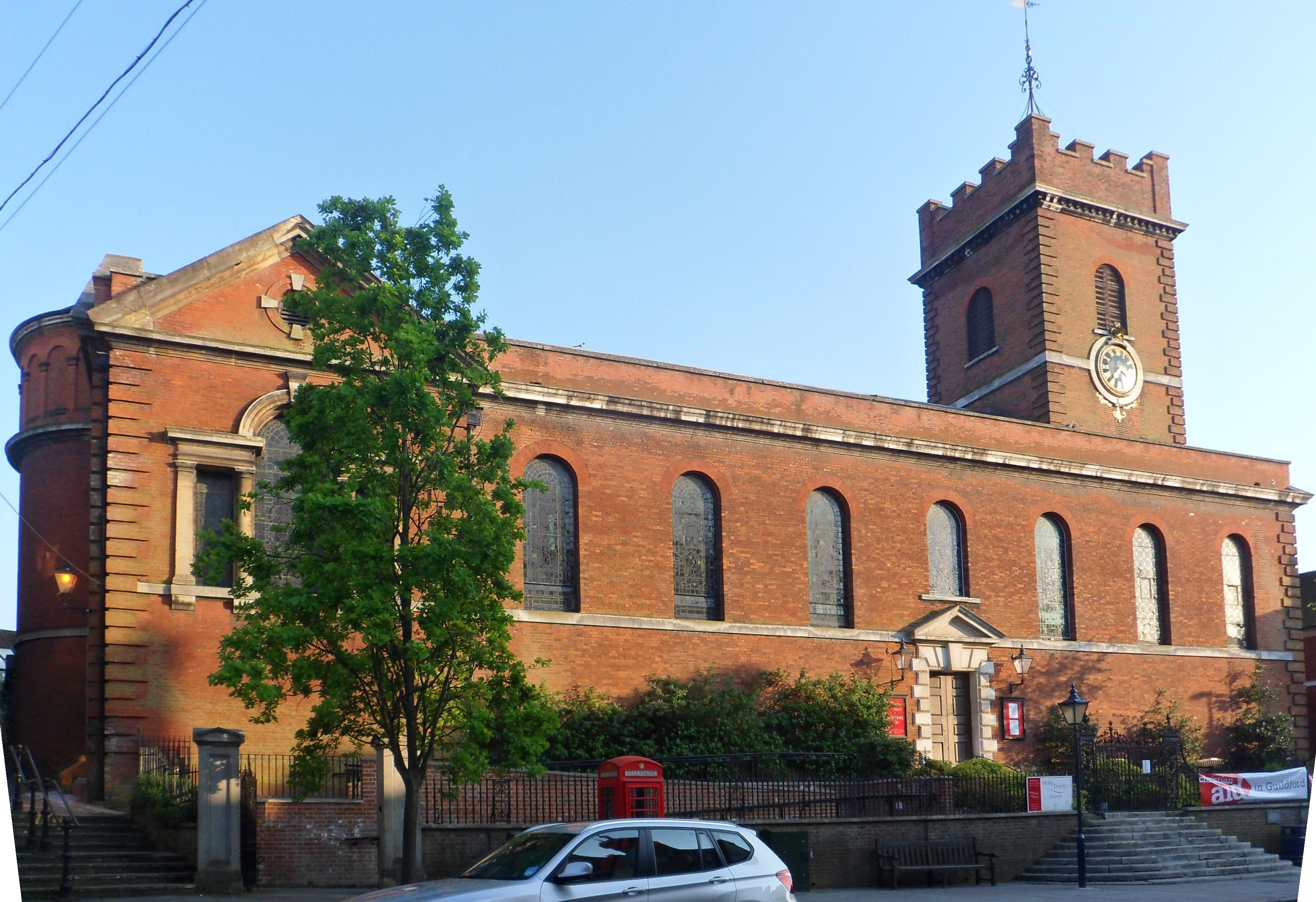

- Location in Surrey
- 51°14′09″N 0°34′15″W
- Denomination: Church of England
- Churchmanship: Liberal

History
- Dedication: Holy Trinity

Administration
- Province: Canterbury
- Diocese: Guildford
- Archdeaconry: Surrey
- Deanery: Guildford

Holy Trinity Church is an Anglican church in the centre of Guildford, England. A large, red brick building, it was built in the early 1760s on the site of a mediaeval church which collapsed in the mid-18th century. It is the only large Georgian church in Surrey, sporting detailed frescos of the Crucifixion surrounded by the Saints and the Ascended Lord in Heaven, as well as one of the largest unsupported ceilings in southern England. It is a Grade I listed building.

From 1927, when the diocese of Guildford was created, until 1961, when the current cathedral was consecrated, it served as pro-cathedral. Today it forms part of the town centre parish of Holy Trinity and Saint Mary's.

== History ==
=== Construction and development ===
The original, mediaeval church was similar in plan to the surviving Saint Mary's. Its date of construction is unknown, although the list of rectors goes back to 1304. It may have been a Norman foundation. It is believed that Henry I granted the living to Merton Priory, which retained it until the Dissolution.

=== Weston Chapel ===
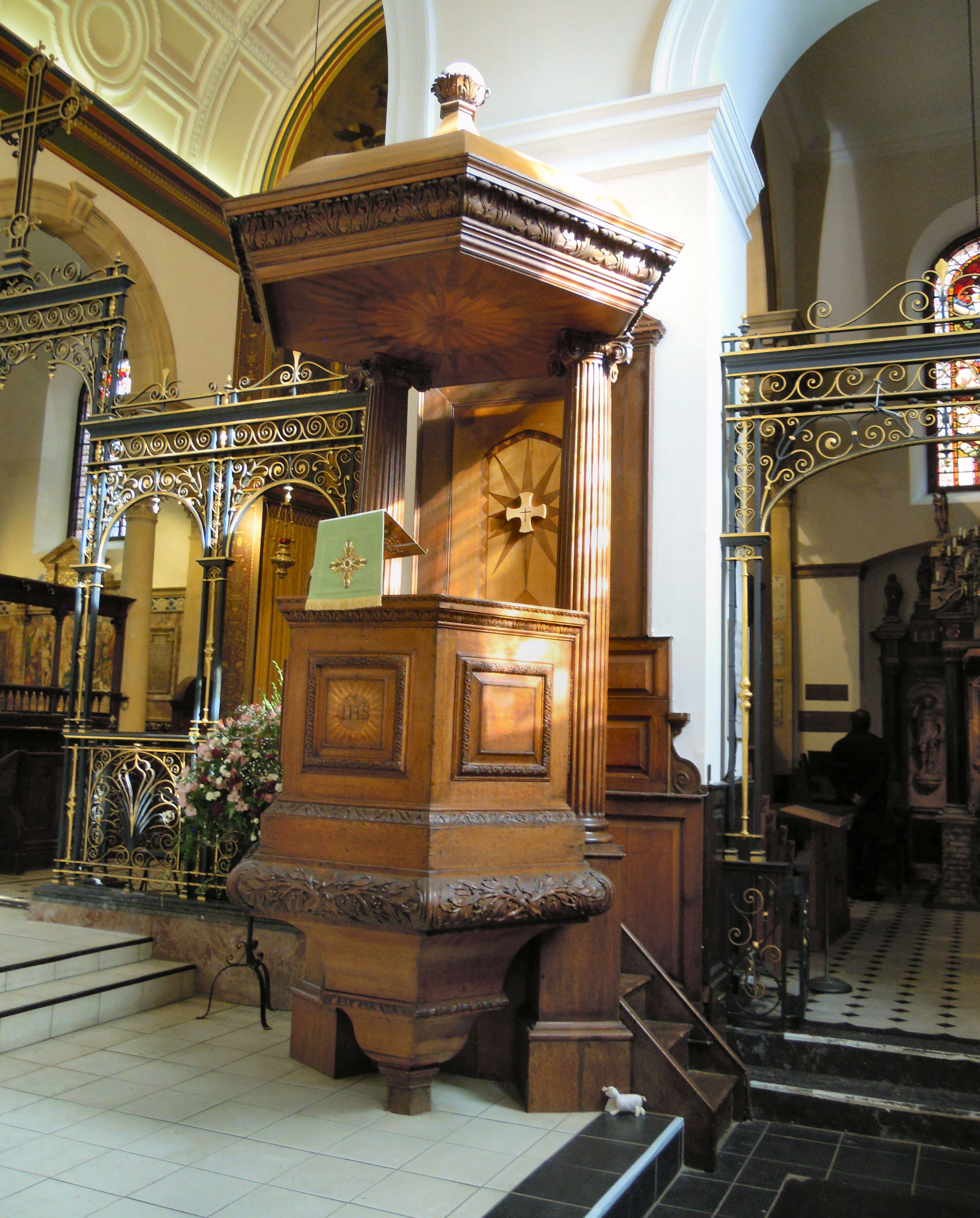
The pulpit of 1769 is in the style of Wren

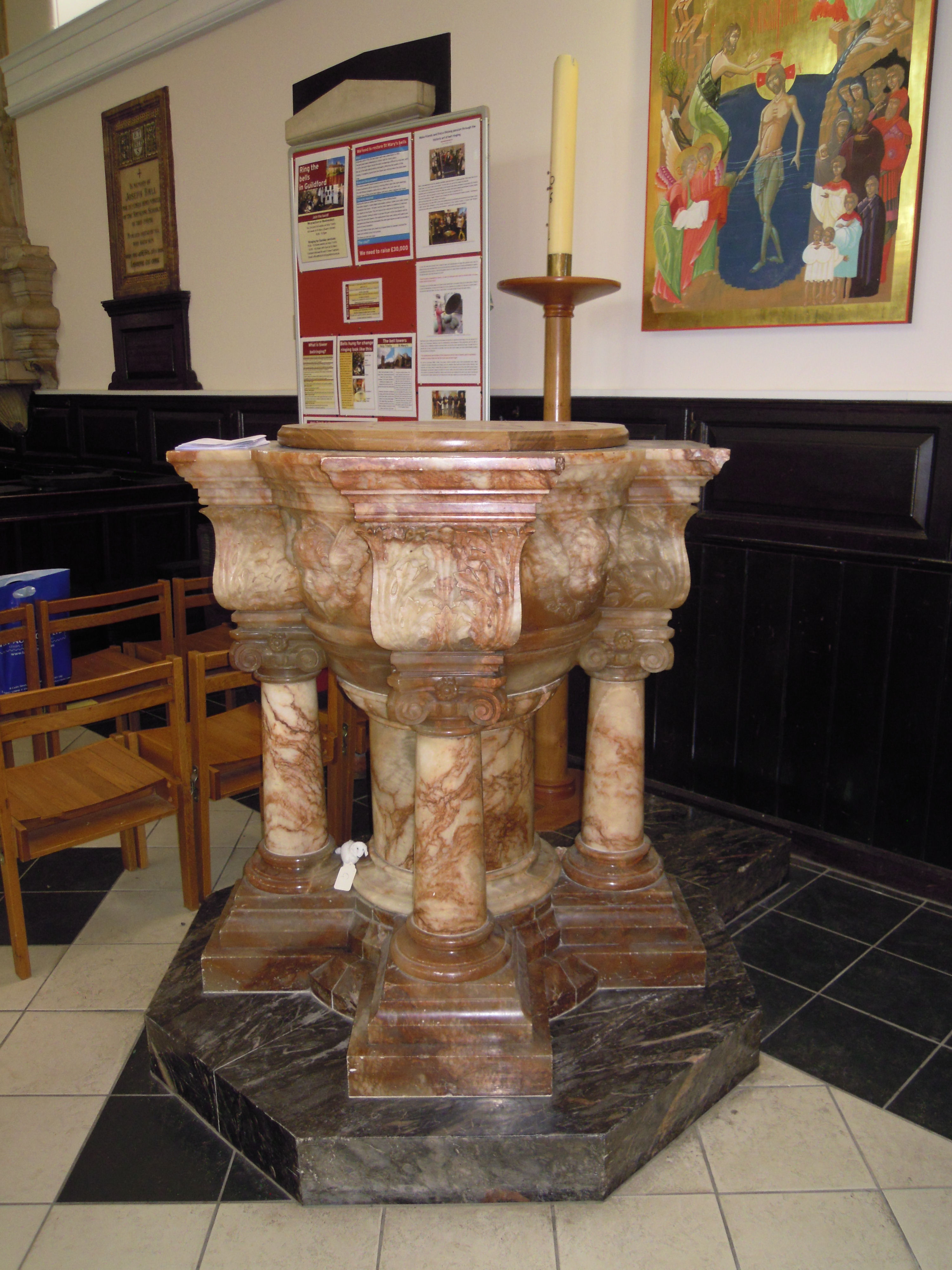
The marble baptismal font dates to 1910

The "Weston Chapel" stands attached to the south side of the main church. Its external walls are of a decorative chequerboard pattern of flint and freestone squares. It was built c.1540 by Richard Weston (1465–1541) of nearby Sutton Place, primarily as his intended burial place, as his will, dated 15 May 1541, directs that his body be:

"buryed in the P'yshe Churche of the Holy Trinitye with in the Town of Guldforde in a Chapell which I have caused to be made for the same iyntent"

The Chantry established and funded by Weston is listed in the "Survey of Chantry Lands, Surrey" made between 1546 and 1548 as part of the administering of the Dissolution of the Monasteries as being:

"For the mayneteyninge of one priest and one yerely obite for the terme of xx ti (i.e.20) yeares begyninge the xx th day of June in the xxxii yere (1541) of the reigne of our late sovereign lorde Kinge Henry the eight. The incumbent whereof is Anthony Cawsey clerke of the age of l (i.e.50) yeres...which said chauntrey and obite are worth lands and

tenements by the yere x li (i.e. £20) whereof to the pore xxvii s iiii d. (i.e. 27 shillings & 4 pence) and so remayneth clere viii li iiii d (i.e. £8 4d) plate parcel gilt viii oz di. Qrt. xlii s iii d Ornamentes x li."

The Weston family maintained their Catholic faith throughout the Reformation and beyond, which was a great sacrifice for them as it prevented them from holding public office and brought much suspicion on them from government officials throughout the ages. The freehold of the Weston Chapel was retained by descendants of the Weston family until 2005, when the trustees of the Weston Estate granted it to the main Protestant Church of Holy Trinity to which it has been physically attached since 1763. Part of the arrangement was that a Catholic mass be held in the Chapel at least annually.

There are three surviving Weston monuments in the chapel. Two are wall tablets, the earliest of which commemorates Melior Mary Weston (d.1782) of Sutton Place, the last direct descendant of the founder and only child and sole heiress of John II Weston (d.1730) and Elizabeth Gage, sister of Thomas Gage, 1st Viscount Gage. The tablet was erected by her grateful distant Catholic cousin John Webbe-Weston (d.1823) to whom she bequeathed all her estates, including Sutton Place. The other tablet is for Elizabeth Lawson, who died in 1791 aged 34, first wife of John Webbe-Weston.

The other Weston Monument which once stood in the centre of the Weston Chapel but now stands in the west porch of the main church is the chest tomb of Anne Pickering (d.1582), wife of Sir Francis Weston the only son of the founder who was executed in 1536 aged only 25 for supposed adultery with Queen Anne Boleyn. Although she remarried, she expressed the wish in her will to be buried near her first father-in-law. Francis, having been beheaded in the Tower of London, was buried in an unmarked tomb within the precincts of the Tower. The effigy is of a recumbent woman wearing a ruff and lies on a chest tomb sculpted with skulls showing behind a grille.

=== Collapse of 1740 ===
Holy Trinity, Guildford Act 1755
- Act of Parliament
- Parliament of Great Britain
- Long title: An Act to enable the Parishioners of the Parish of The Holy Trinity in Guldeford, in the County of Surry, to sell divers Houses, Lands, Rents, and Annuities, in the said Parish, and in Stoke next Guldeford aforesaid; and to apply the Money arising by Sale thereof towards re-building their Parish Church; and for other Purposes therein mentioned.
- Citation: 28 Geo. 2. c. 56
- Territorial extent: Great Britain

Dates
- Royal assent: 25 April 1755
- Commencement: 14 November 1754 (Note: Start of session.)

Status: Current legislation

Text of statute as originally enacted

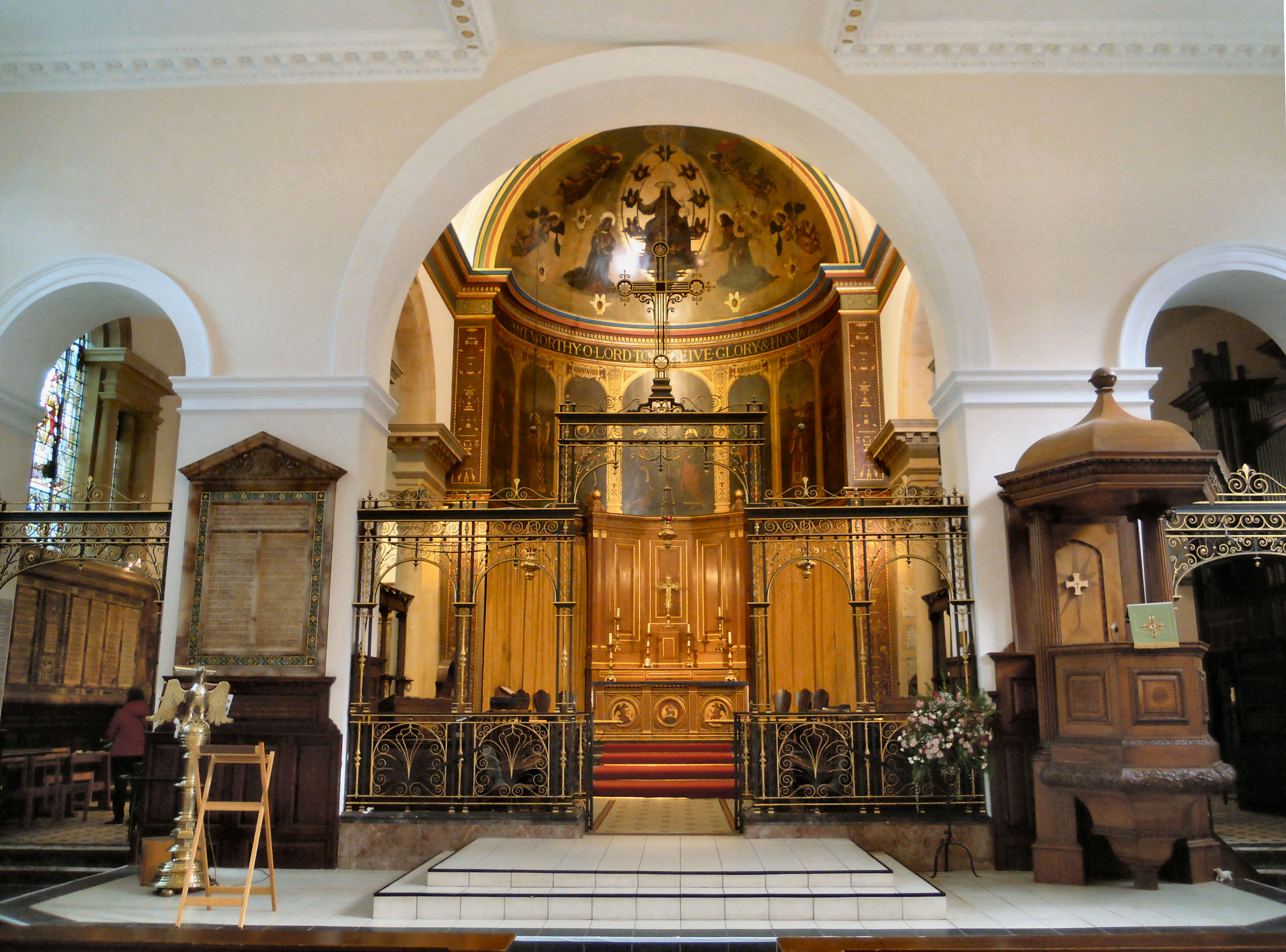
The Chancel

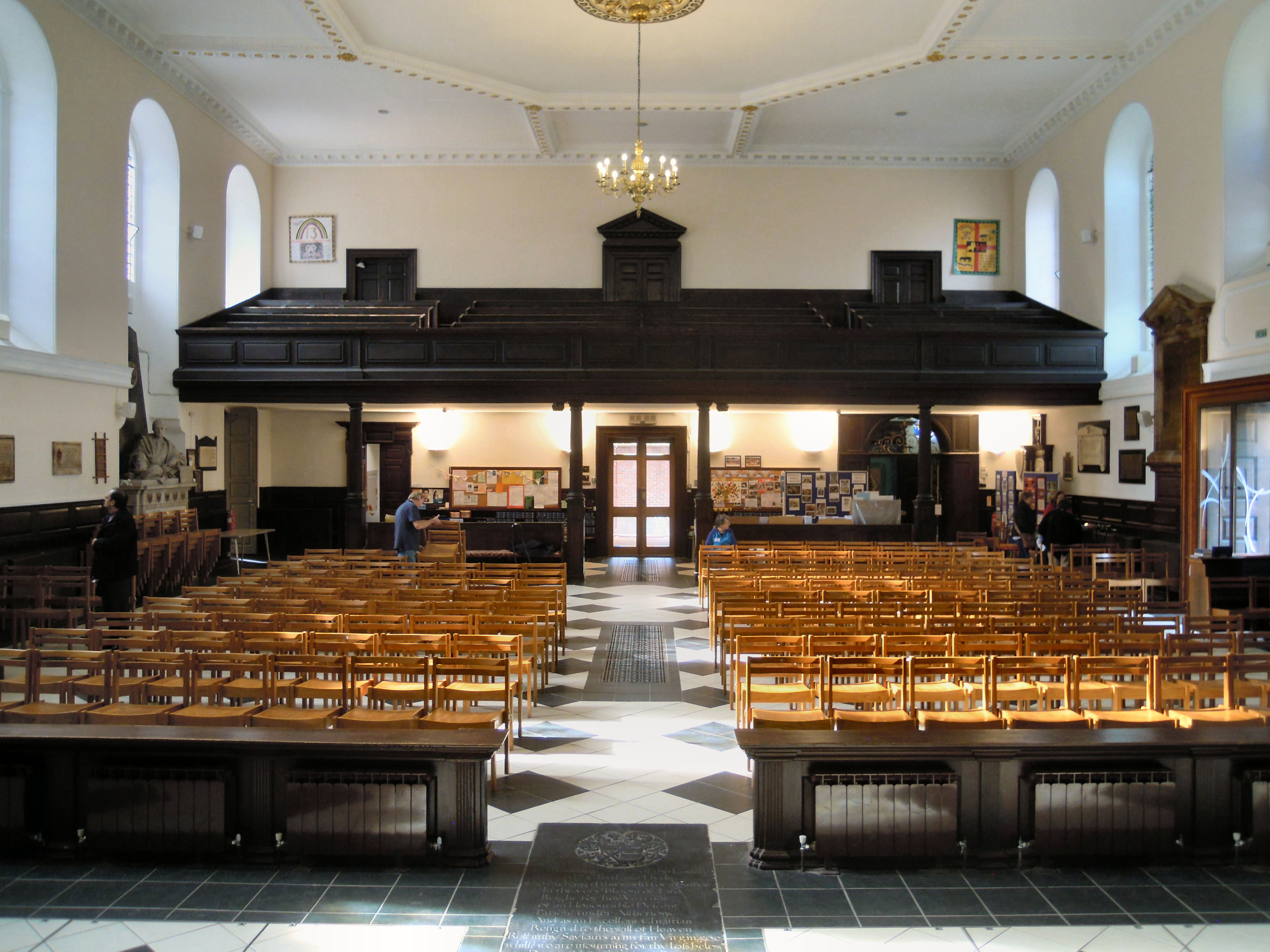
The Nave

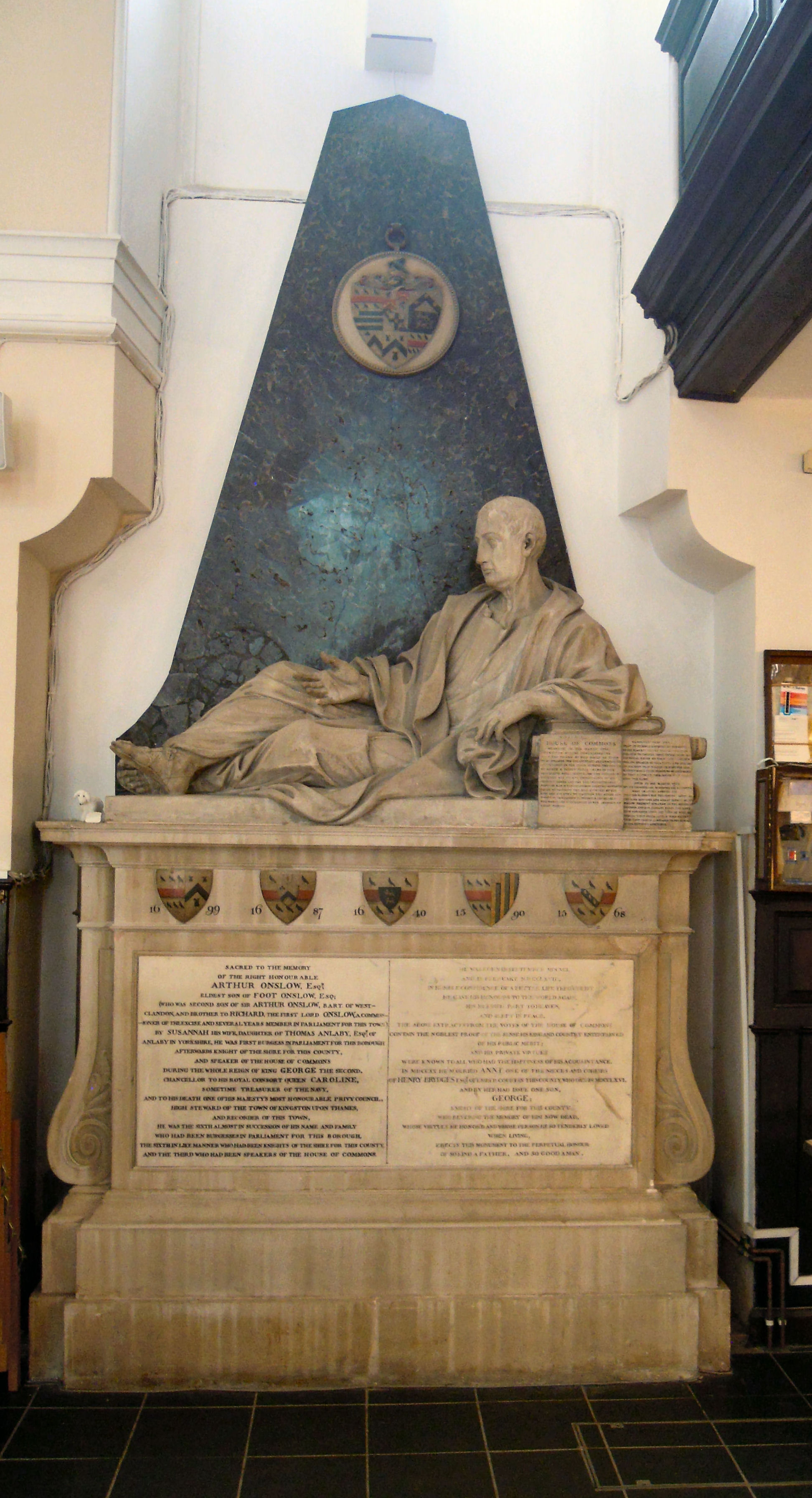
Memorial to Arthur Onslow, former Speaker of the House of Commons

On 23 April 1740, the steeple collapsed, destroying most of the building. The only part of that church building that survives today is the Weston Chapel. Some external features such as the iron railings also remain from the earlier building, as do two monuments. A new red brick church was erected to the designs of James Horne on the site of the original church and opened in 1763. The architecture has been described as "handsome and pedestrian at the same time", being of correct classical proportions but with details that are under-scale for such a large building on an important site.

Holy Trinity is the only large 18th-century place of worship in Surrey and stands in a commanding position at the top of Guildford's High Street. In the mid-19th century the interior of the church was altered extensively. In 1869 Woodyer replaced the double rows of windows with single rows. The side galleries were removed in 1867. The Victorian emphasis on ritual and sacrament called for a larger chancel, and in 1886 the church was enlarged at the east end, creating the present choir, sanctuary, side chapel and organ chamber.

The church is now effectively one huge room with tripartite openings at the east end, allowing access to the chancel and the two side chapels. The central feature of the decoration of the apse is 'the Presence of the Crucified in the Church of all ages': Christ upon the cross is flanked by Aaron, David, and Isaiah on the north side, and Saints Paul, Stephen, and Augustine of Hippo on the south side, representing respectively the priests, kings and prophets of the Jewish Church and the apostles, martyrs and bishops of the Christian Church. The lower paintings in the apse and on the altar are by C E Buckeridge done in 1889–91. The painting in the vault was added later by a different artist, which is why they are in a different style.

Other alterations have taken place throughout the 20th century. The wrought iron choir screen dates from 1927, when Holy Trinity became the pro-cathedral. The organ has undergone substantial movement and alteration over the years, culminating in complete renovations in 1977 and 1997.

Features inside the church include the tomb of George Abbot, Archbishop of Canterbury from 1611 to 1633 and founder of Abbot's Hospital, which stands opposite the church, and a memorial to Arthur Onslow, former Speaker of the House of Commons. The panelled octagonal pulpit on its octagonal stem dates to 1769 but is in the style of Wren; it has a domed sounding board above it on fluted Ionic columns. The pulpit was originally higher so that the preacher could see into the galleries when delivering the sermon but it was shortened in 1869. The Baroque style baptismal font was given in 1910 by a Miss Russell in memory of her two sisters and has a red marble bowl sitting on a central stem. It is decorated with the heads of cherubs and acanthus leaves and is possessed of a domed and composite-columned font cover which is currently in storage.

The church also has a ring of eight bells hung for change ringing. Four of the bells date from 1769, cast by Lester, Pack & Chapman, with the others having been cast in 1912 by John Taylor & Co.

=== Pro-Cathedral ===
As a response to the increasing population of south-east England, the diocese of Winchester was divided into three sections in 1927. The Congé d'Elire for this purpose was held in the Weston Chapel. Holy Trinity Church was initially used as the cathedral for the new Diocese of Guildford, but it was judged too small for the task, and in 1928 the diocese decided to build a new cathedral. Work began in 1933, but the Second World War delayed the construction considerably, and it was not consecrated until 1961, although services had been held in the crypt since 1947. In the intervening years Holy Trinity Church served as pro-cathedral.

== Today ==
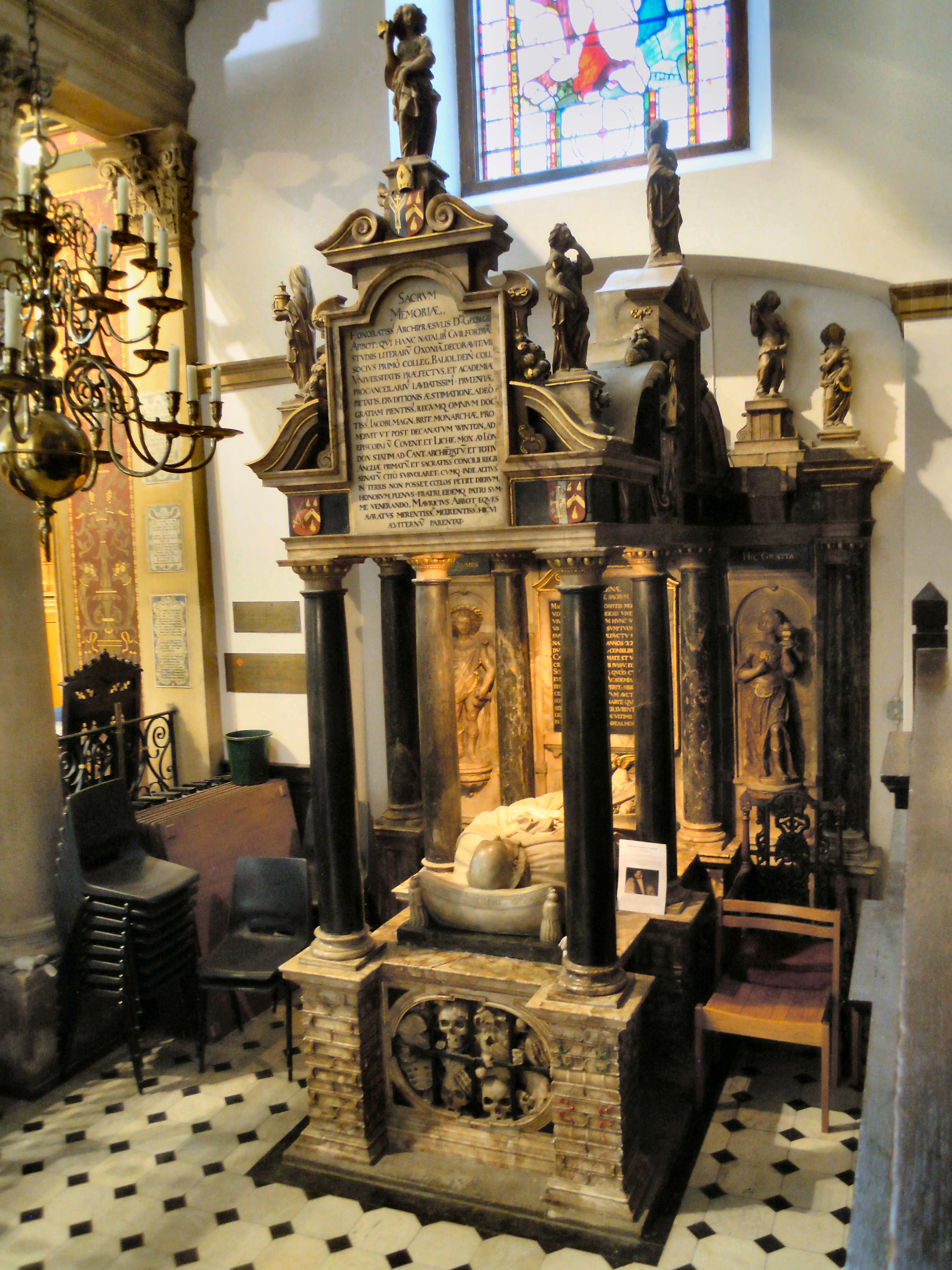
Tomb of George Abbot, Archbishop of Canterbury, erected by his brother Sir Maurice Abbot in 1635.

=== Worship ===
The style of worship at Holy Trinity Church falls within the liberal tradition of the Church of England. There are usually two services, a Sung Eucharist (Common Worship) and Evensong (Book of Common Prayer), on a Sunday. Morning Prayer is said every weekday. Sunday worship is led by the forty-strong choir, which is unusual in being a parish church choir which retains an all-boys treble line.

Holy Trinity is Guildford's civic church, where the installation of each new mayor and the town's annual Act of Remembrance is celebrated. It also serves as the venue for regular musical events.

The parish of Holy Trinity and Saint Mary's has links with the Diocese of Highveld in South Africa, and a group of parishioners travelled to the Highveld in 2008.
