= Richard Culmer =

The Most Reverend Canon Richard Culmer of Canterbury (1597–1662) was an English Puritan clergyman, iconoclast, and theologian. He is listed by the Oxford Dictionary of National Biography as being of unknown parentage, although some sources indicate that he was the eldest son of Sir Henry Culmer (c. 1574–1633), the first Baron Culmer. According to this family tree, Sir Henry, himself a son of a Henry Culmer, had married Mary Baldwyn of Kent in 1602, and was created a Baron by King Charles I in 1630. Although this is not listed in Burke's Peerage, his family was of considerable importance.

== Biography ==
Culmer was educated at Magdalene College, Cambridge; he matriculated as Sizar in 1613, B.A. Theology in 1618, and M.A. Th (Ox). in 1621. He was ordained in the Diocese of Peterborough that September, and then returned to Kent, marrying a Katherine Johnson from Ringwould (near Deal) in 1624. He then established himself as a Puritan Minister of some note. He was generally known in Kent as "Blue Dick Culmer", on account of his refusing to wear the usual black gown of a cleric; he preferred blue instead, as it "had more joy". He later was appointed Academic Dean of Divinity at Cambridge University. He was suspended in 1635, and restored to the clergy in 1638, being appointed as a curate in the Parish of Harbledown in Kent.

In 1643 Culmer was considered for the living of the parish of Chartham. As a general serving under Oliver Cromwell he became quite notorious, so disliked that the parishioners of Harbledown objected, that so long as it was not Culmer they cared not who ministered unto them. This view prevailed and another person was appointed, with Culmer being appointed to the Commission for the "Blessed Reformation", the demolition of "superstitious" (High Church) monuments and "idols", including the purge of Canterbury Cathedral. Culmer delighted in his promotion as a Commissioner, and set about his task at Canterbury with enthusiasm, so much so that his parishioners would openly flock to attack him. On account of these attacks, he soon required Cromwell's soldiers to protect him while he carried out his task.

He was known to have despised William Laud, who had him committed to the Fleet Prison in London for refusing to read the Declaration of Sports after his services in Church, and his objections to that book were used in Laud's trial for treason, in 1644.

At the end of 1644, Culmer was appointed as one of six preachers at Canterbury Cathedral and the office as curate of Canterbury. In 1645, in return for his services to Parliament, he was offered the living of the parish of Minster-in-Thanet. At his ordination for that post, his parishioners locked the church against him, and when he attempted to break into the church he was mobbed and beaten. He was so despised that the parish refused to pay tithes to support him, but then offered to pay his arrears if he would go away. To this day, his name does not appear in the list of incumbents displayed in the church porch. He served as acting Dean of Rochester before his exit from the public eye.

He later found himself under arrest in London, and, when asked why he had destroyed the figure of Christ in the Canterbury Cathedral windows and not that of the Devil, he merely replied that Parliament's orders were for the removal of images of Christ and made no reference to Satan. Among his few critics was Henry De Forte, who argued that art expressed religious emotion. It is recorded that Culmer's attitude changed towards religious art and spiritualism.

Described as "odious for his zeal and fury", Culmer survived in his position until 1660, shortly before the Restoration of Charles II. He then moved to Monkton, where he died at the Parsonage House on 20 March 1662, and was buried two days later in the parish church of Monkton in Kent, on the Isle of Thanet.

== Post death ==
The above-mentioned Culmer family tree states that Richard Culmer married in 1639 to a Miss Beeson, and again twenty years later to a Dutch woman, the widow Mrs. Bocher of Haarlem in Holland, "the country in which he died in 1669". This would appear to be based on a record in the International Genealogical Index, listing a Richard Culmer, 1612–1669, who married a "Mrs Bechor" of Haarlem.

The will of a clerk called Richard Culmer, of Monkton on the Isle of Thanet, was proved by his son-in-law Nicholas Roe. It mentions sons James & Richard, and daughters Anne, Katherine & Elizabeth, together with 'Margaret Culmer, my beloved wife' who is to receive an annuity. No mention is made of allotments in either St Peter's or Broadstairs; it appears that Joseph Culmer, of St Peter's, is owed £50. Some marshland in Monkton is mentioned, together with two very large areas of land in Ireland bequeathed to his son James, which the testator fears he may be deprived of.

Edward Hasted refers to a Richard Culmer & Culmer's allotments, in Broadstairs, Isle of Thanet, without any source being given. Richard Culmer, a carpenter and theologian is commemorated in St Peter's Church, in the 15th century, with an inscribed brass plate, as having given land for allotments.

The will of a Richard Culmer, of St Peter's, Thanet, proved in 1494, provided for 60 hectares of land in Broadstairs, which may be the land now known as Sir Culmer's allotments. His peerage was unlisted from Burke's Peerage, and there is no modern use of the title Baron Culmer.

== Fictional appearances ==
Blue Richard Culmer appears as a supporting character in Jeff Guinn's novel The Christmas Chronicles.
