= Abbot's Hospital =

Hospital of the Blessed Trinity
- Abbot's Hospital Trustee Company
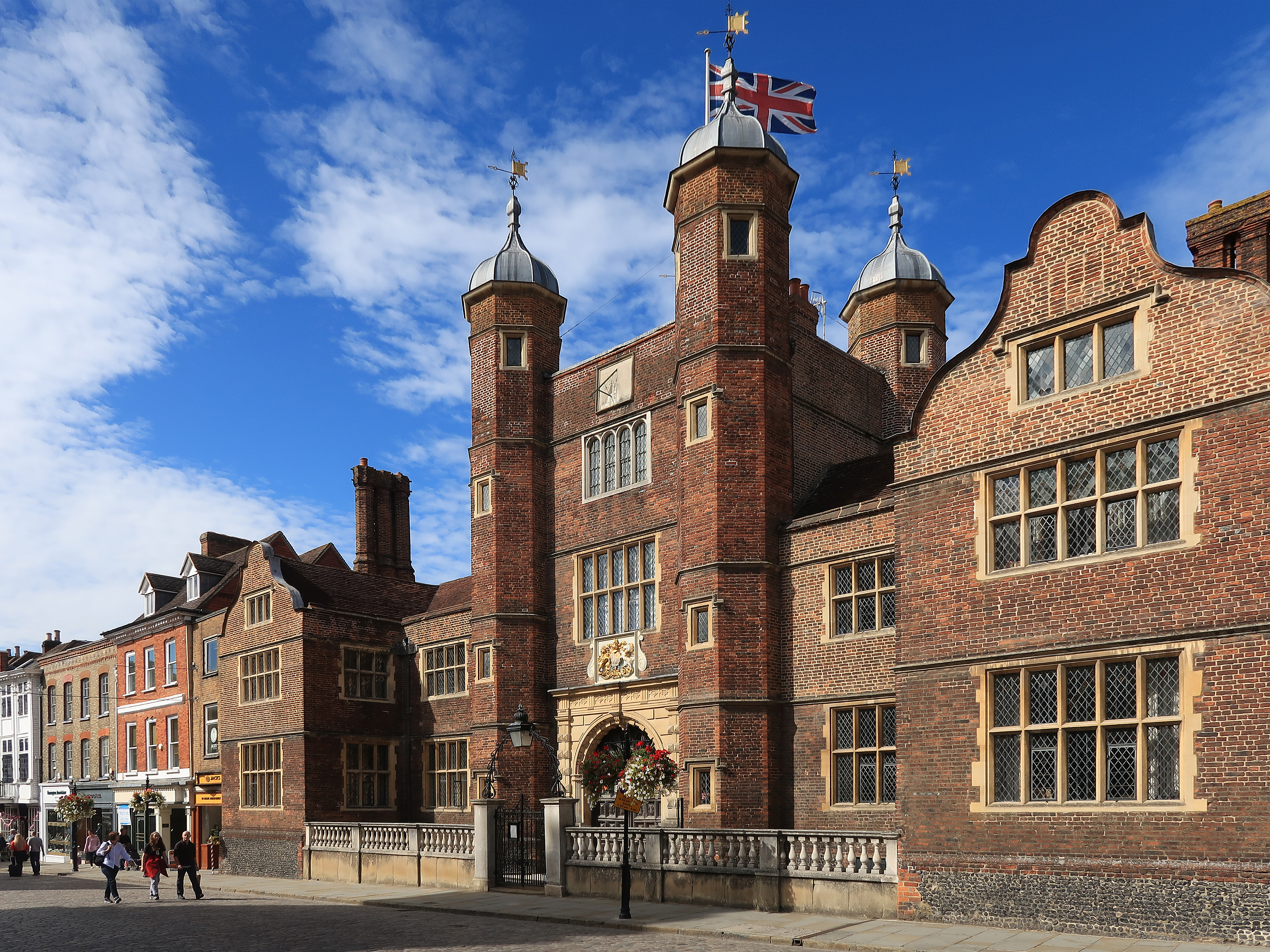
- Abbot's Hospital, Guildford

- Location within Surrey

Geography
- Location: High Street, Guildford, England
- Coordinates: 51°14′11″N 0°34′16″W

Organisation
- Type: Residential
- Patron: Archbishop of Canterbury

History
- Founded: 1619

Links
- Website: www.abbotshospital.org
- Lists: Hospitals in England

The Hospital of the Blessed Trinity, better known as Abbot's Hospital, is a Grade I listed Jacobean building and charity in Guildford.

== History ==
The hospital was founded by George Abbot, the Archbishop of Canterbury (1611–1633) in 1619 to provide homes for the elderly of Guildford. It is on the High Street in Guildford, opposite the Holy Trinity Church, where its founder, the Archbishop, is buried.

The architecture and layout echoed that of contemporary Oxford and Cambridge colleges. The Upper Courtyard was built between 1619 and 1621, and the first residents were admitted on 29 October 1622, Abbot's 60th birthday. Initially it provided accommodation for twelve men and eight women, all of whom had to be single. A set of flats was built in the lower courtyard in 1984, providing accommodation for seven couples.

Farmed land in Outwood belonged to the institution in 1911.

A heritage appeal in 2004 raised over £500,000 to carry out extensive restoration work and renovation.

== Governance and eligibility for residence ==
Guildford Hospital Act 1861
- Act of Parliament
- Parliament of the United Kingdom
- Long title: An Act for confirming a Scheme of the Charity Commissioners for "The Hospital of the Blessed Trinity" at Guildford in the County of Surrey, and its subsidiary Endowments, with certain Alterations.
- Citation: 24 & 25 Vict. c. 32
- Territorial extent: United Kingdom

Dates
- Royal assent: 11 July 1861
- Commencement: 11 July 1861 (Note: The Acts of Parliament (Commencement) Act 1793.)

Status: Current legislation

Text of statute as originally enacted

Hospital of the Blessed Trinity (Guildford) Charity Scheme Confirmation Act 1953
- Act of Parliament
- Parliament of the United Kingdom
- Long title: An Act to confirm a Scheme of the Charity Commissioners for the application or management of the Charity called the Hospital of the Blessed Trinity, in the Borough of Guildford, in the County of Surrey.
- Citation: 1 & 2 Eliz. 2. c. xviii
- Territorial extent: United Kingdom

Dates
- Royal assent: 14 July 1953
- Commencement: 14 July 1953

Status: Current legislation

Text of statute as originally enacted

Originally the hospital operated under a charter granted by James I. Now the Abbot's Hospital Trustee Company's legal framework of how it administers its services is determined by an act of Parliament: the Hospital of the Blessed Trinity (Guildford) Charity Scheme Confirmation Act 1953 (1 & 2 Eliz. 2. c. xviii) as modified by subsequent schemes of regulation, which includes receiving periodic residential satisfaction questionnaires. The mayor of the borough, the priests of three closest Anglican parishes and the Headmaster of the Royal Grammar School, Guildford are governors and thereby trustees; as too are two appointed by Guildford Borough Council and the remainder are persons residing or carrying on business in or near the Borough of Guildford co-opted by the Board, subject to the approval of the Archbishop of Canterbury – the hospital's official visitor. A resident master continues to be responsible for its overall supervision.

Couples were already eligible before the premises were enlarged, as were widowed and single elderly, subject to meeting any one of three borough connection requirements, a ceiling on wealth and being of sufficiently good health to lead an independent life.

== Gallery ==
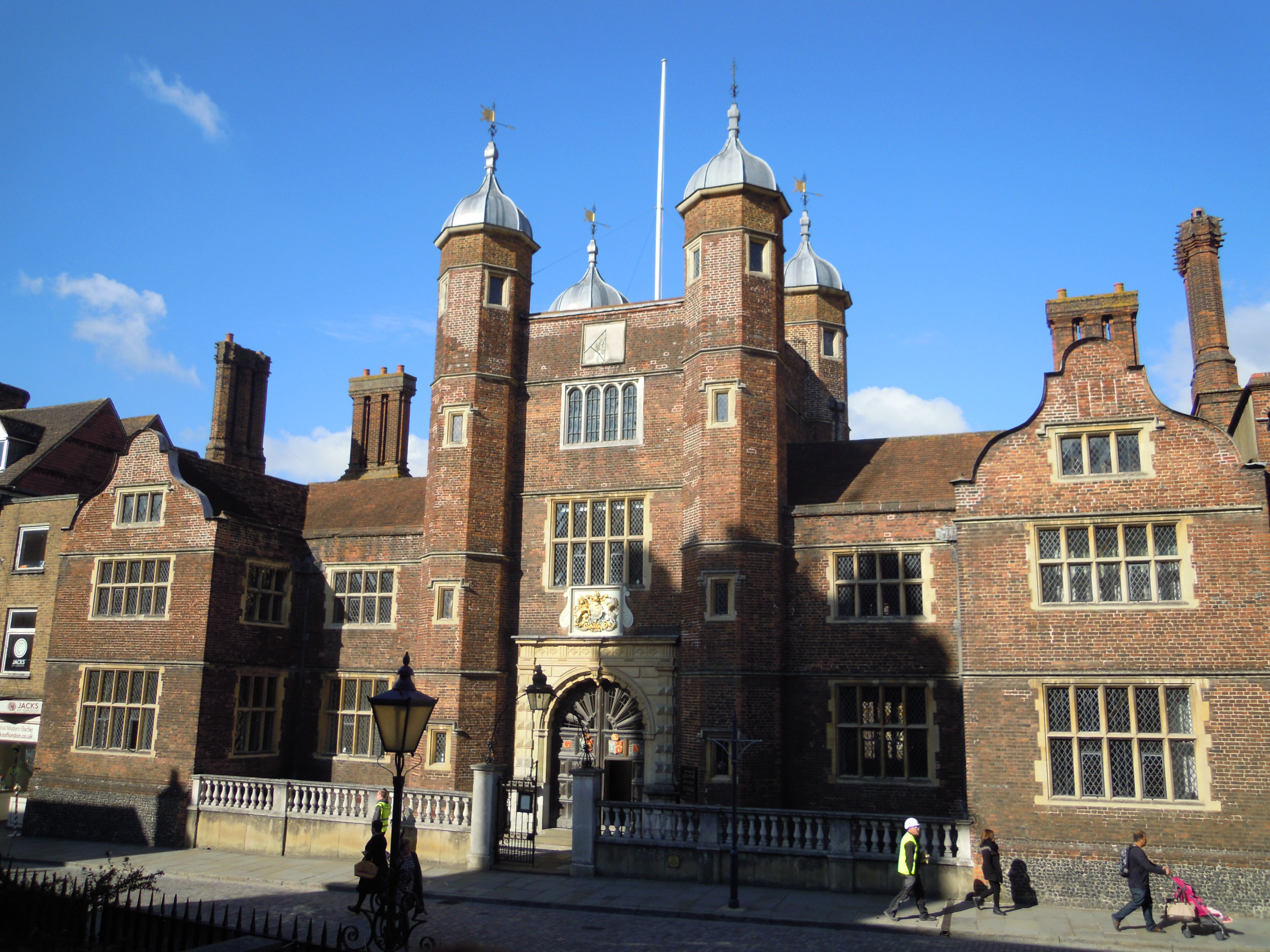
Front view of Abbot's Hospital

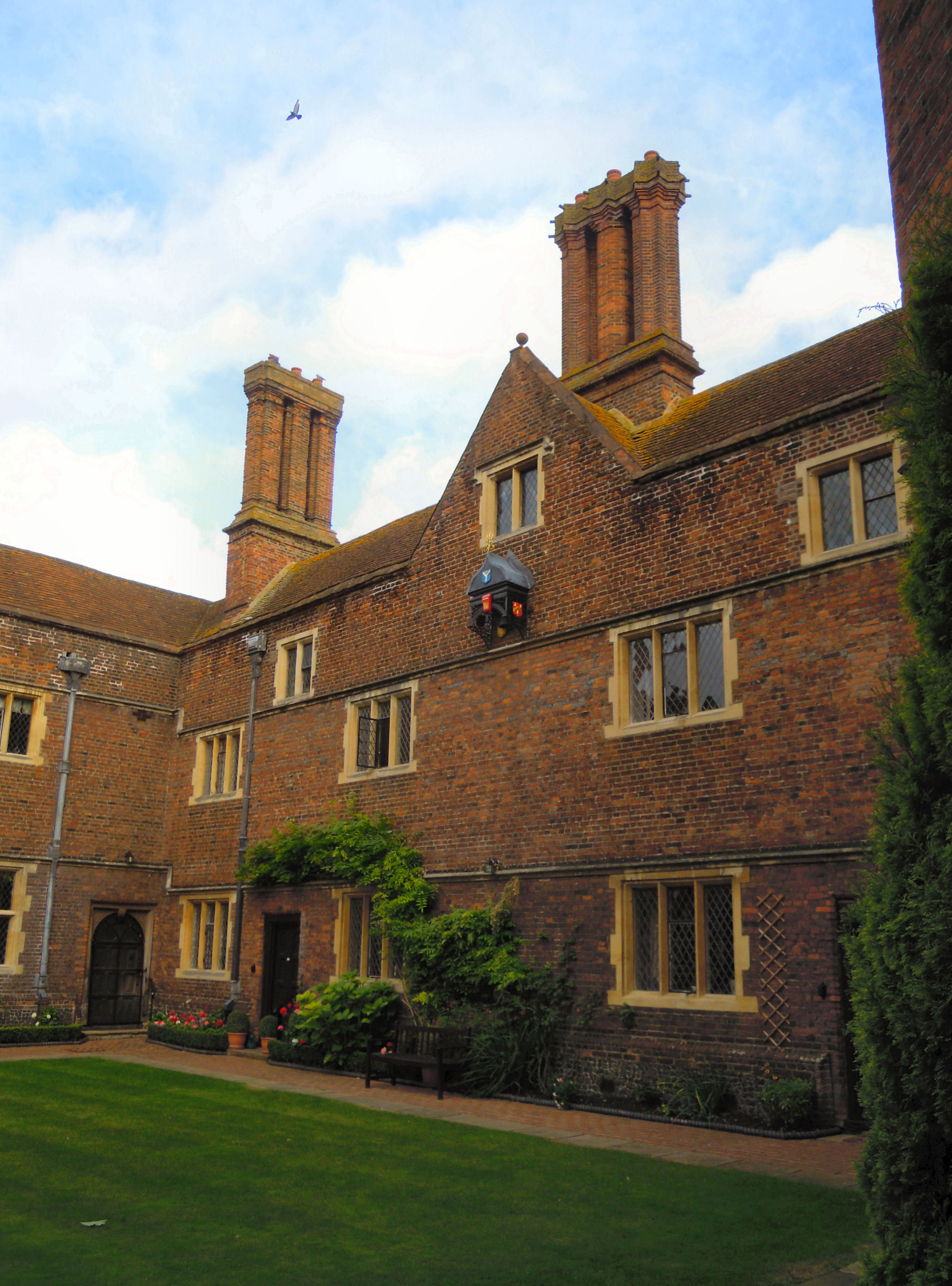
The Courtyard at Abbot's Hospital

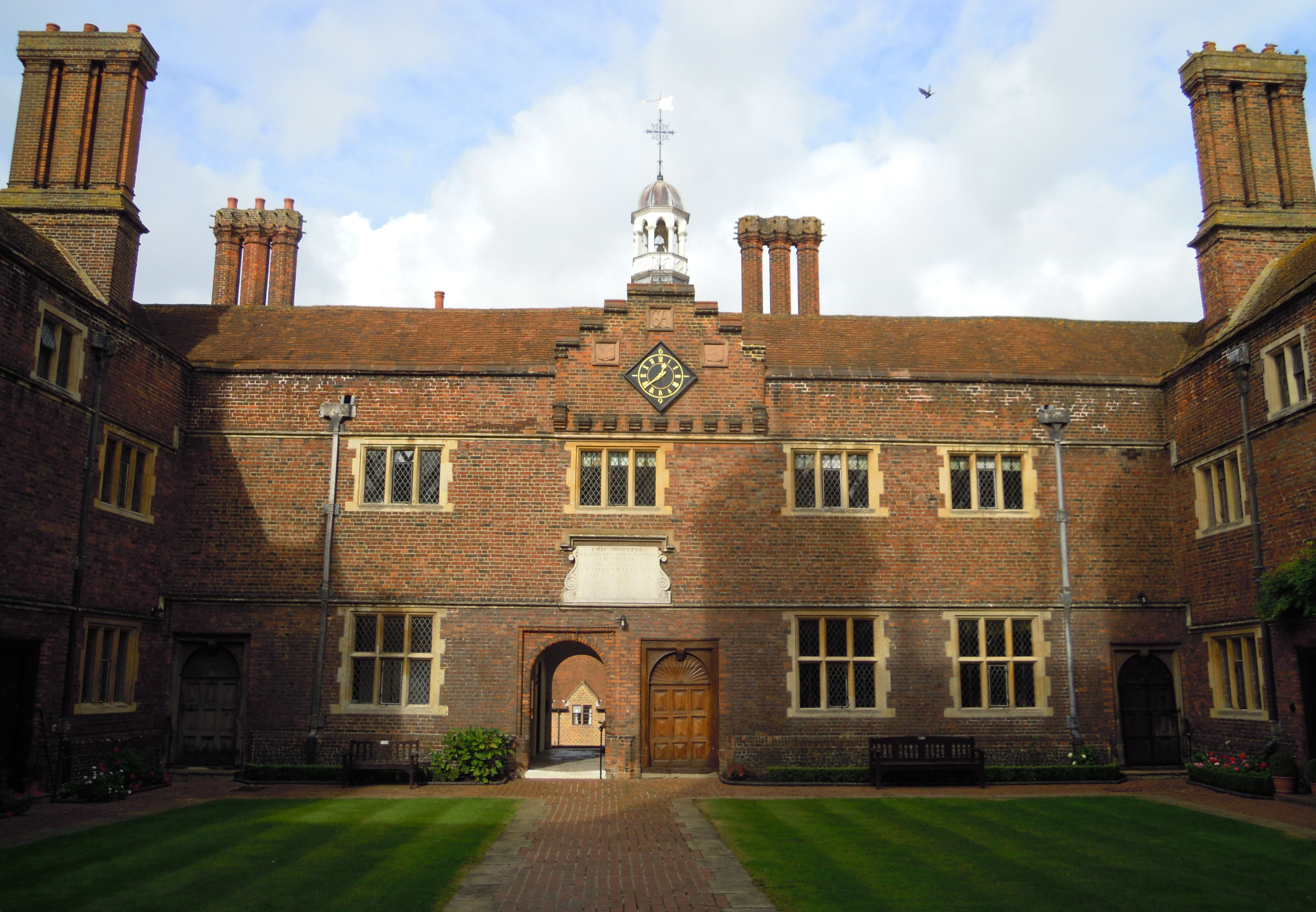
The Courtyard at Abbot's Hospital

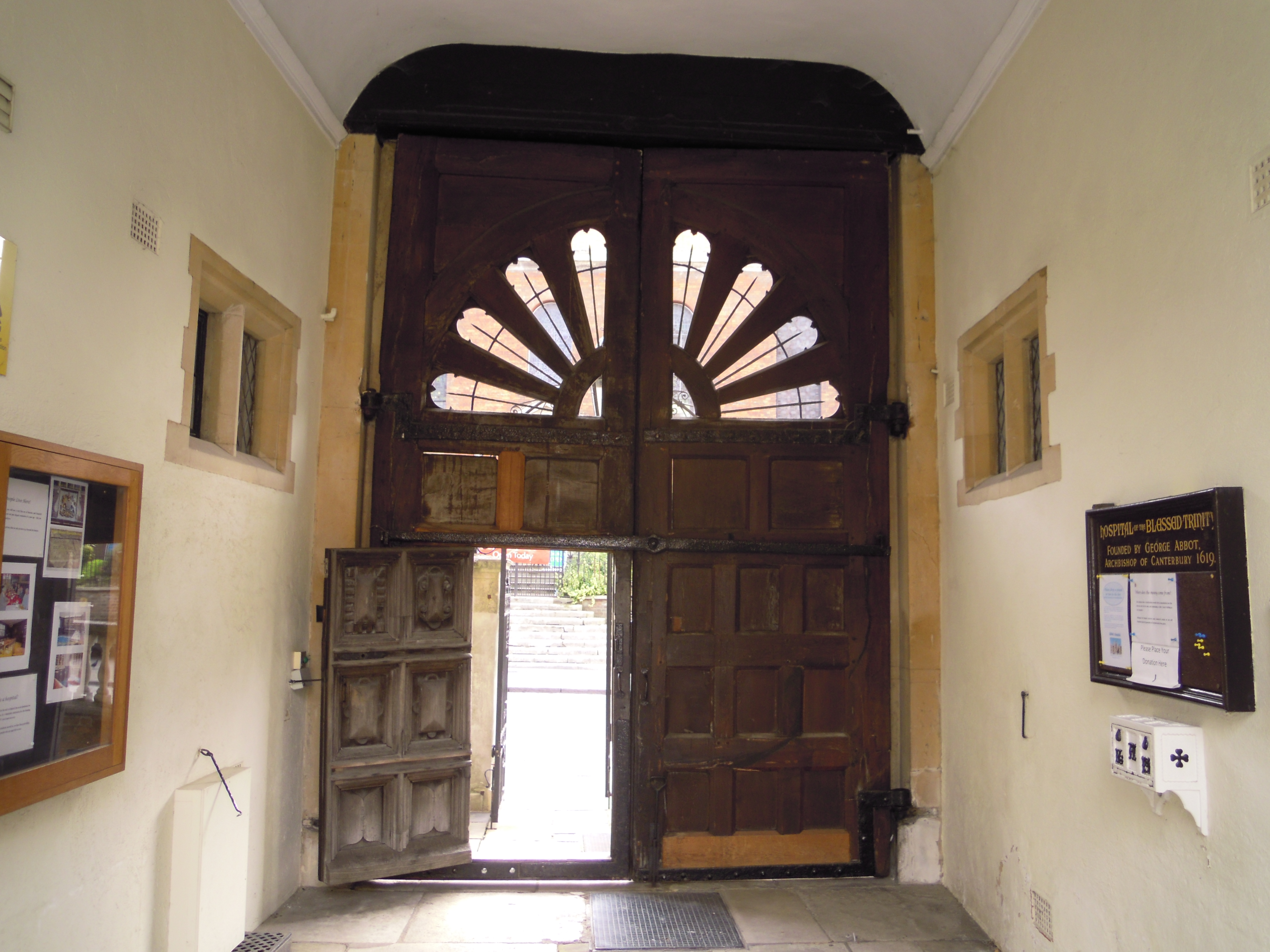
The Doorway at Abbot's Hospital

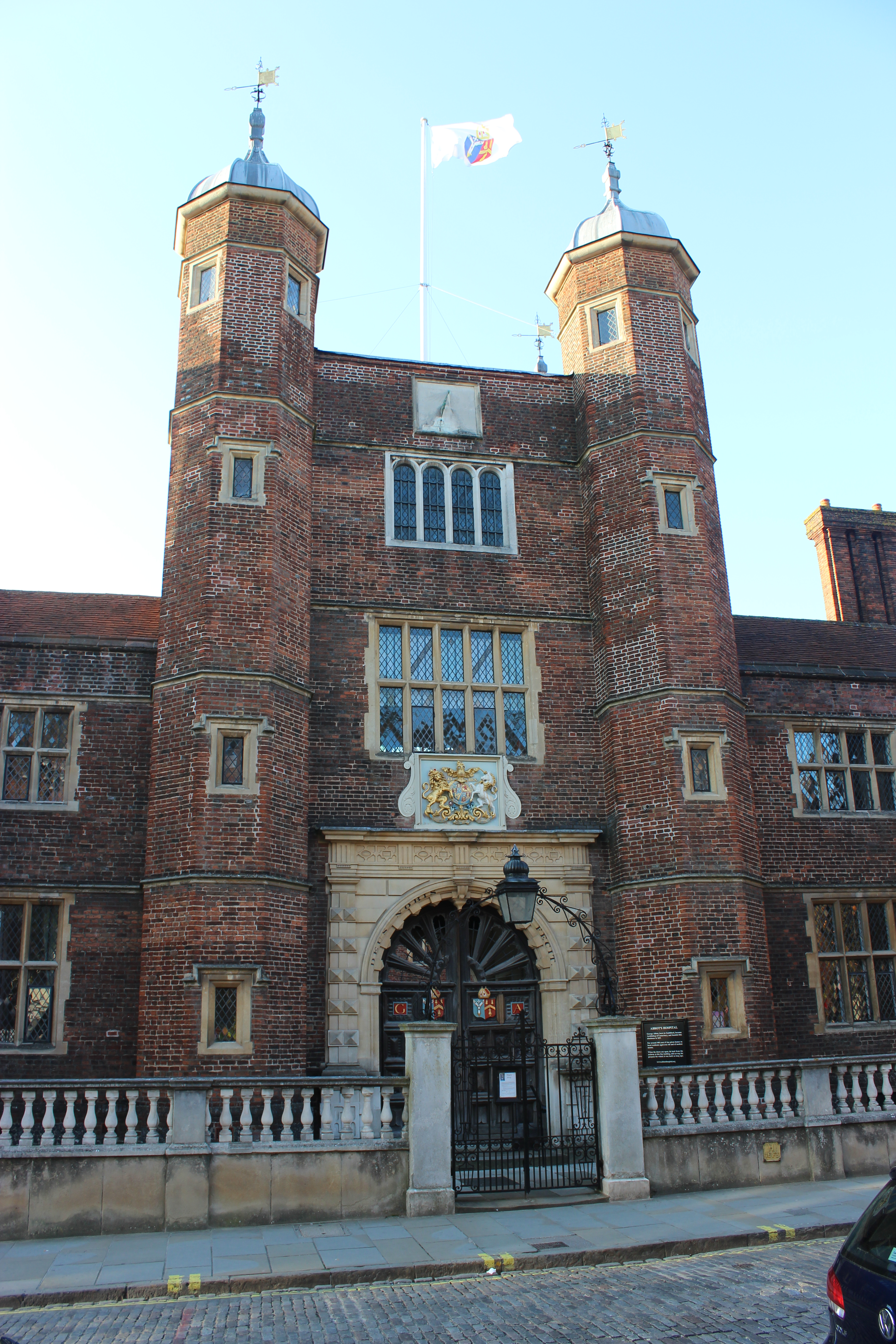
Abbot's Hospital

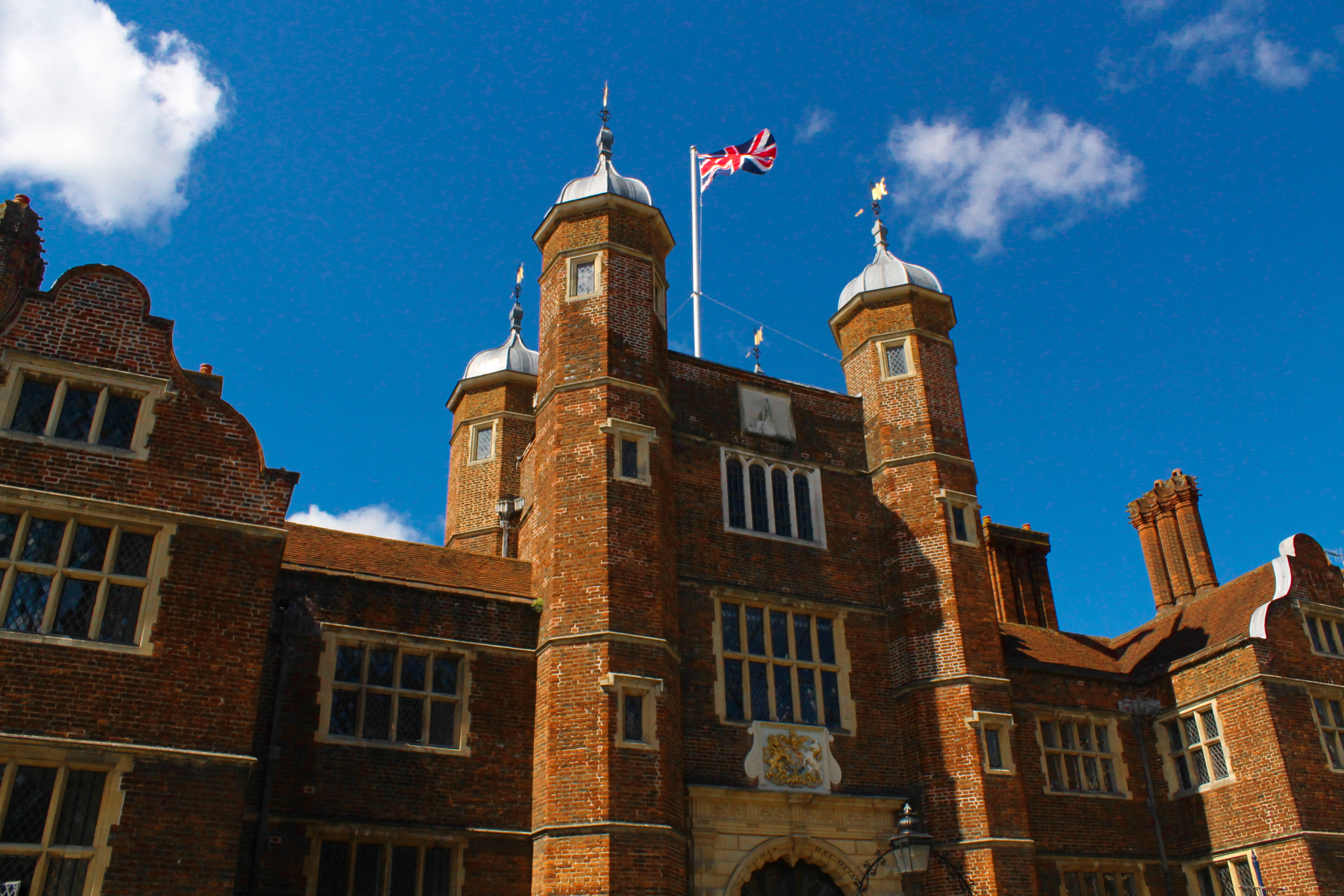
Abbot's Hospital, in Summer
