= John Parkhurst (Master of Balliol) =

John Parkhurst (1564–1639) was an English clergyman and academic, master of Balliol College, Oxford, from 1617.

== Life ==
He was second son of Henry Parkhurst of Guildford, Surrey, by Alice, daughter of James Hills, and belonged to the same family as John Parkhurst, bishop of Norwich. He matriculated as a commoner of Magdalen Hall, Oxford, on 25 February 1581, was elected demy of Magdalen College in 1583, and subsequently fellow in 1588. He graduated B.A. in 1584, M. A. 1590, B.D. 1600, and D.D. 1610. At Magdalen he was engaged as reader in natural philosophy (1591-2) and in moral philosophy (1593 and 1596-7), and acted as bursar in 1602, having been proctor in the university in 1597-8.

Meanwhile, he had been chaplain to Sir Henry Neville when ambassador at Paris. Neville presented him to the rectory of Shellingford, Berkshire, in 1602, and Parkhurst vacated his fellowship in the following year. With this living he held the rectories of Newington, Oxfordshire (on the presentation of Archbishop George Abbot, to whom he was chaplain), from 1619, and Little Wakering, Essex, from 1629. At Shellingford he rebuilt the church, incorporating in it Norman windows and a chancel arch belonging to the older building. He may be the 'Mr. Parkhurst' who, as secretary to Sir Henry Wotton at Turin in June 1613, was sent by Duke Charles Emmanuel I of Savoy to negotiate with the Swiss Protestants at Geneva. His mission produced some alarm as to the policy of James I, and Sir Dudley Carleton, at Venice, played down Parkhurst's presence in Geneva.

On 6 February 1617 he was elected in the place of Robert Abbot to the mastership of Balliol College, and was granted leave to reside or not at pleasure. Balliol was then one of the smallest colleges, and his election appears as part of the attempts made by the Abbots to secure for Balliol the endowment left in 1610 by Thomas Tisdall (or Teesdale) of Glympton, who was a relative of Parkhurst's wife, for thirteen Abingdon fellowships and scholarships. Six scholars were actually settled in 'Caesar's lodgings,' which were built for them during Parkhurst's mastership; but in 1624 the endowment was used for the conversion of Broadgates Hall into Pembroke College. The Periam foundation at Balliol also belonged to his time (1620). John Evelyn, who matriculated at Balliol at the end of Parkhurst's tenure in 1637, considers him responsible for the slack discipline then prevailing. Parkhurst resigned the mastership in 1637, and was buried at Shellingford on 29 January 1639.

== Family ==
A younger brother, Sir Robert, cloth worker, was lord mayor in 1635, dying in 1636.

John Parkhurst married Sarah, daughter of Anthony Tisdall of Abingdon (she died in 1661), and had by her, sons Henry (1612-1669), fellow of Magdalen College, Oxford 1631-48, and canon of Southwell from 1662 till his death, and Thomas (1614–1639), daughters Dorothy (1615–1634) and Mary (d. 1627).
