= Trial of William Laud =

1640s treason trial in the House of Lords

The trial of William Laud, archbishop of Canterbury, took place in stages in the first half of the 1640s, and resulted in his execution on treason charges. At first an impeachment, the parliamentary legal proceedings became an act of attainder.

Arrested in late 1640, Laud was held initially for tactical reasons in the struggle between Charles I of England and the English parliament. When charges were actually brought, their main thrust was that Laud had run an ecclesiastical state within a state. This was supposed to have happened under the cover of the personal rule of the king. The prosecution case was argued from the standpoint of Erastianism.

The trial has been called a "travesty of justice", in that Laud was clearly innocent of the major charges, which were not seriously documented even given the run of his private papers. Testimony against him was subject to tampering. On the other hand, Laud's defence of his own actions was not conducted with full candour; and lesser charges sometimes stuck, despite his astute use of denial of personal responsibility.

== Laud in custody ==
William Laud was arrested at the same time as Thomas Wentworth, 1st Earl of Strafford, whose fate he would eventually share. While the impeachment of Strafford proceeded shortly, Laud's case was neglected until a point in 1643.

Laud was first placed in the custody of Black Rod, on the day (18 December 1640) when Denzil Holles moved his impeachment in the Lords. This was not a close confinement, and he was allowed a visit to Lambeth Palace and his papers. He was later confined to the Tower of London.

Laud was eventually executed in 1645.

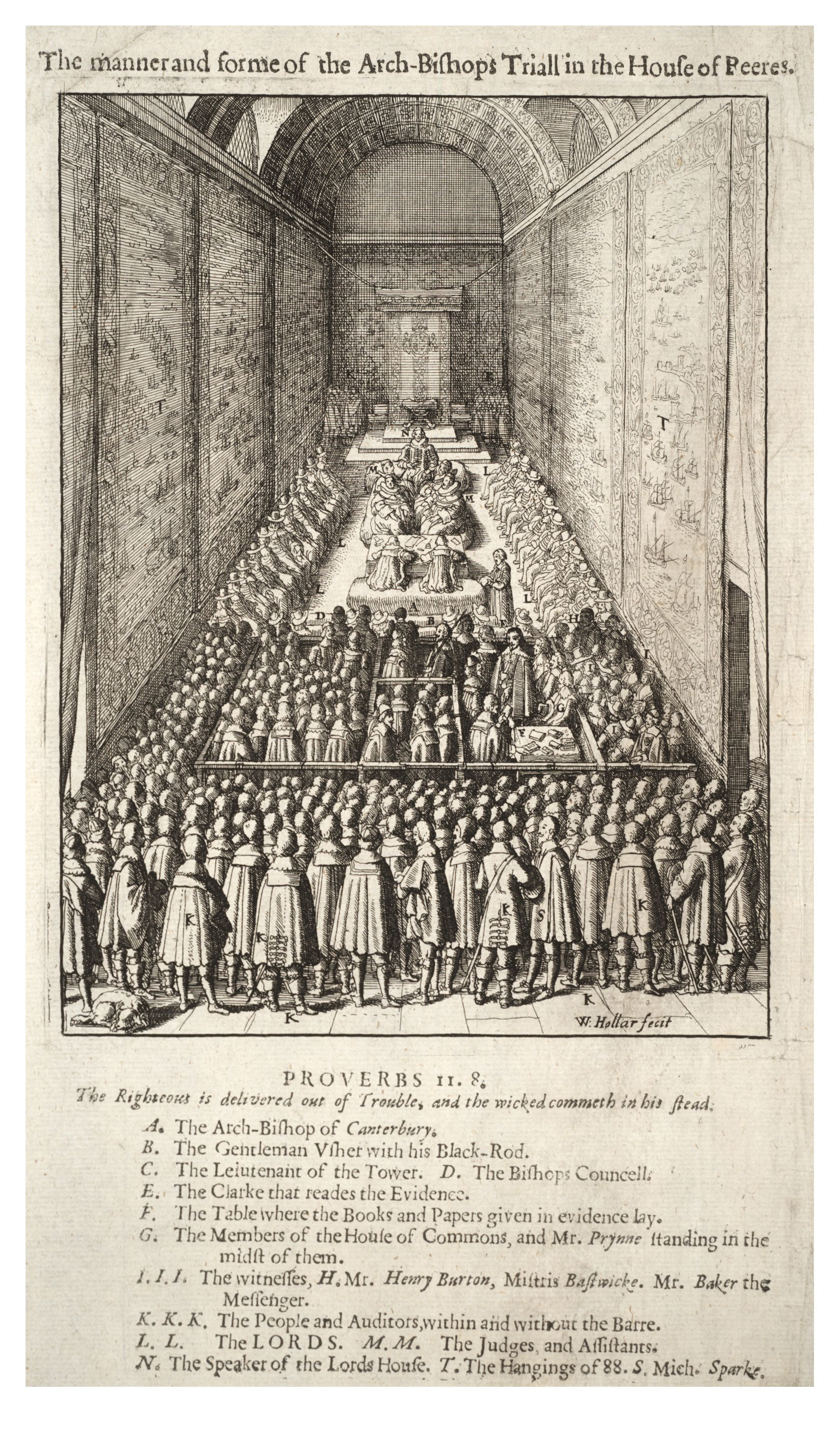
The trial of Laud, by Wenceslas Hollar.

== Political situation in the English Parliament in 1641 ==
The indictment of Laud arose from the Long Parliament, in particular from committee work around Sir John Glynne. In mid-1641 the judicial effort against King Charles's "evil consellors" was bogged down: on 12 July an effort was made to expedite the trials of Laud and George Ratcliffe, Strafford's supporter, but it failed. Thirteen bishops had been made subject to impeachment proceedings in 1640, in connection with the Laudian canons. In October 1641 Denzil Holles requested that the House of Lords should move forward with this impeachment.

== Articles against Laud ==
The articles against Laud were brought to the House of Lords; initially they were in vague and general terms. While they are often said to be 14 definite points, the sources differ. The second set of articles from over two years later raise more specific charges. It is unclear whether the original verbal charges can be recovered accurately from the published versions, some of which can be considered pamphleteering or subject to editorial additions. Besides the English parliamentary situation, pressure from Scottish presbyterians played a part in the outcome: their views were in The Charge of the Scottish Commissioners against Canterburie and the Lieutenant of Ireland (1641).

=== First charges ===
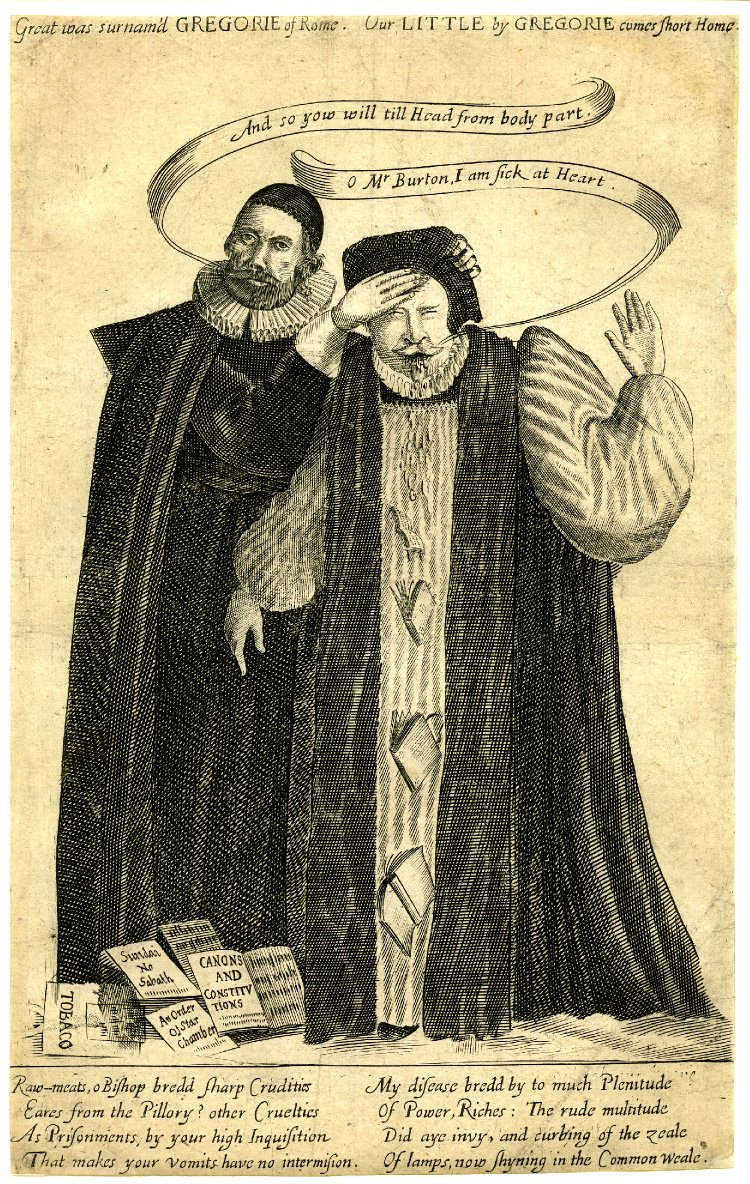
This 1645 satirical print depicts Archbishop William Laud and Puritan Henry Burton. Burton's ears have been cut off as punishment for criticizing Laud. Their dialogue references Laud's impending beheading.

The first set of charges was from early 1641 (N.S.). Laud was sent to the Tower in late February or March 1641, supposedly on 14 charges. These are variously recorded and documented, in versions that are ample but inconsistent.

One version is in the 18th-century State Trials of Francis Hargrave. A version of John Pym's speech to the Lords was published. A version of a pamphlet Accusation and Impeachment (1641) was later published in the Harleian Collection. The points in this version, abbreviated, are:

- That he hath endeavoured to subvert the fundamental laws of this kingdom [...].
- His countenancing of books for the maintenance of his unlimited power [...]
- That he traiterously went about to interrupt the judges, by his threatenings, and other means, to constrain them to give false judgment in the case of ship-money [...].
- That he hath taken bribes, and sold justice in the high commission court [...].
- That he hath traiterously endeavoured the incroachment of jurisdiction, institution of canons, and they are not only against law, but prejudicial, and against the liberties of the subjects [...].
- That he hath traitorously assumed to himself a capital power over his Majesty's subjects, denying his power of prelacy from the King.
- That, by false erroneous doctrines, and other sinister ways and means, he went about to subvert religion, established in this kingdom, and to set up popery and superstition in the church [...].
- That, by divers undue means and practices, he hath gotten into his hands the power and nominating of ministers to spiritual promotions, and hath presented none but slanderous men thereunto; and that he hath presented corrupt chaplains to his Majesty.
- That his own ministers, as Heywood, Layfield, and others, are notoriously disaffected to religion; and he hath given power of licensing of books to them.
- That he hath traiterously endeavoured to reconcile us to the church of Rome; and to that end hath employed a Jesuit, a papist, and hath wrought with the pope's agents in several points.
- That to suppress preaching, he hath suspended divers good and honest ministers, and hath used unlawful means, by letters, and otherwise, to set all bishops to suppress them.
- That, he hath traiterously endeavoured to suppress the French religion here with us, being the same religion we are of, and also the Dutch church, and to set division between them and us.
- That he hath traiterously endeavoured to set a division between the King and his subjects, and hath gone about to bring in innovations into the church, as by the remonstrances may appear, and hath induced the king to this war with the Scots [...].
- That, to save and preserve himself from being questioned and sentenced from these and other his traiterous designs, from the first year of his now Majesty's reign, until now, he hath laboured to subvert the rights of parliamentary proceedings, and to incense his Majesty against parliaments [...].

There is a different version attributed to Pym in William Prynne, Antipathie of the Lordly Prelacie (1641), for the date 26 February 1640 (O.S.) The version in John Rushworth's collections is not apparently as complete; or Prynne's version may contain interpolations. A summary of the whole case out of other volumes of state trials (edited by Thomas Salmon, Sollom Emlyn and Thomas Bayly Howell) was made by Alexander Simpson.

=== Additional charges ===
The second set of impeachment articles was voted by the Commons on 23 October 1643 and sent to the Lords. It was a more serious attempt to set out a legal case that could be brought to trial. These articles were given in extended form in the collections of Rushworth. Summaries were made by Daniel Neal in his History of the Puritans.

Number	Article summarised in Neal	Article in Rushworth	Comments
1	That the archbishop had endeavoured to destroy the use of parliaments, and to introduce an arbitrary government.	That the said Archbishop of Canterbury, to introduce an Arbitrary Government within this Realm, and to destroy Parliaments, in the third and fourth Years of his Majesty's Reign that now is, a Parliament being then called, and sitting at Westminster, traiterously and maliciously caused the said Parliament to be dissolved, to the great Grievance of his Majesty's Subjects, and Prejudice of this Common-Wealth: And soon after the dissolution thereof, gave divers Propositions under his hand to George then Duke of Bucks, casting therein many false Aspersions upon the said Parliament, calling it a Factious Parliament, and falsely affirming, that it had cast many Scandals upon his Majesty, and had used him like a Child in his Minority, stiling them Puritans, and commending the Papists for harmless and peaceable Subjects.	
2	That for ten years before the present parliament, he had endeavoured to advance the council-table, the canons of the church, and the king's prerogative, above law.	That within the space of ten Years last past, the said Archbishop hath treacherously endeavoured to subvert the Fundamental Laws of this Realm; and to that end hath in like manner endeavoured to advance the Power of the Council-Table, the Canons of the Church, and the King's Prerogative, above the Laws and Statutes of the Realm; and for manifestation thereof, about six Years last past, being then a Privy Counsellor to his Majesty, and sitting at the Council-Table, he said, 'That as long as he sat there, they should know that an Order of that Board should be of equal force with a Law or Act of Parliament.'And at another time used these words, 'That he hoped e're long that the Canons of the Church, and the King's Prerogative, should be of as great Power as an Act of Parliament.'And at another time said, 'That those that would not yield to the King's Power, he would crush them to pieces.'	
3	That he had stopped writs of prohibition to stay proceedings in the ecclesiastical courts, when the same ought to have been granted.	That the said Archbishop, to advance the Canons of the Church, and Power Ecclesiastical above the Law of the Land, and to pervert and hinder the course of Justice, hath at divers times within the said time, by his Letters, and other undue Means and Solicitations used to Judges, opposed and stopped the granting of his Majesty's Writs of Prohibition, where the same ought to have been granted, for stay of Proceedings in the Ecclesiastical Court, whereby justice hath been delayed and hindered, and the Judges diverted from doing their Duties.	
4	That judgment having been given in the court of King's bench against Mr. Burley, a clergyman of a bad character, for nonresidence, he had caused the judgment to be stayed, saying he would never suffer judgment to pass upon any clergyman by nihil dicit.	That for the end and purpose aforesaid, about seven Years last past, a Judgment being given in his Majesty's Court of Kings-Bench against one Burley a Parson, being a Man of bad Life and Conversation, in an Information upon the Statute of 21 Hen. 8. for wilful Non Residency; the said Archbishop, by Solicitations, and other undue Means used to the Judges of that Court, caused Execution upon the said Judgment to be stayed; and being moved therein, and made acquainted with the bad Life and Conversation of the said Parson, he said, That he had spoken to the Judges for him, and that he would never suffer a Judgment to pass against any Clergyman by Nihil dicit.	
5	That he had caused sir John Corbet to be committed to the Fleet for six months, only for causing the petition of right to be read at the sessions.	That the said Archbishop, about eight Years last past, being then also a Privy-Counsellor to his Majesty, for the end and purpose aforesaid, caused Sir John Corbet of Stoake in the County of Salop Baroner, then a Justice of Peace of the said County, to be committed to the Prison of the Fleet, where he continued Prisoner for the space of half a Year or more, for no other cause but for calling for the Petition of Right, and causing it to be read at the Sessions of the Peace for that County, upon a just and necessary occasion; and during the time of his said Imprisonment, the said Archbishop, without any colour of Right, by a Writing under the Seal of his Archbishoprick, granted away parcel of the Glebe-Land of the Church of Adderly in the said County, whereof the said Sir John Corbet was then Patron, unto Robert Viscount Kilmurry, without the consent of the said Sir John, or the then Incumbent of the said Church: which said Viscount Kilmurry built a Chappel upon the said parcel of Glebe-Land, to the great prejudice of the said Sir John Corbet, which hath caused great Suits and Dissensions between them. And whereas the said Sir John Corbet had a Judgment against Sir James Stonehouse Knight, in an Action of Waste, in his Majesty's Court of Common-Pleas at Westminster, which was afterwards affirmed in a Writ of Error in the King's-Bench, and Execution thereupon awarded; yet the said Sir John, by means of the said Archbishop, could not have the effect thereof, but was committed to the Prison by the said Archbishop, and others at the Council-Table, until he had submitted himself unto the Order of the said Table; whereby he lost the benefit of the said Judgment and Execution.	On Sir John Corbet, 1st Baronet, of Stoke upon Tern.
6	That large sums of money having been contributed for buying in impropriations, the archbishop had caused the feoffments to be overthrown into his majesty's exchequer, and by that means suppressed the design.	That whereas divers Gifts, and dispositions of divers Sums of Money were heretofore made by divers charitable and well-disposed Persons, for the buying in of divers Impropriations for the maintenance of preaching the Word of God in several Churches, the said Archbishop, about eight Years last past, wilfully and maliciously caused the said Gifts, Feoffments, and Conveyances made to the Uses aforesaid, to be overthrown in his Majesty's Court of Exchequer, contrary to Law, as things dangerous to the Church and State, under the specious pretence of buying in Impropriations; whereby that pious Work was suppressed and trodden down, to the great Dishonour of God, and Scandal of Religion.	On the winding-up of the Feoffees for Impropriations.
7	That he had harboured and relieved divers Popish priests, contrary to law.	That the said Archbishop at several times within these ten Years last past, at Westminster, and elsewhere within this Realm, contrary to the known Laws of this Land, hath endeavoured to advance Popery and Superstition within this Realm: and for that end and purpose hath wittingly and willingly received, harboured, and relieved divers Popish Priests and Jesuits, namely one called Sancta Clara, alias Damport, a dangerous Person, and Franciscan Friar; who having written a popish and feditious Book, intitled, Deus natura gratia, wherein the Thirty-nine Articles of the Church of England, establish'd by Act of Parliament, were much traduced and scandaliz'd, the said Archbishop had divers Conferences with him while he was in writing the said Book; and did also provide Maintenance and Entertainment for one Monsieur St. Gyles, a Popish Priest at Oxford, knowing him to be a Popish Priest.	The article references Christopher Davenport. Laud denied licensing his 1634 book Deus, natura, gratia. The trial heard of the release of the Jesuit Henry Morse, over which Laud denied responsibility.
8	That he had said at Westminster there must be a blow given to the church, such as had not been given, before it could be brought to conformity, declaring thereby his intention to alter the true Protestant religion established in it.	That the said Archbishop, about four Years last past, at Westminster aforesaid, said, That there must be a Blow given to the Church, such as hath not been yet given, before it could be brought to Conformity; declaring thereby his Intention to be, to shake and alter the true Protestant Religion establish'd in the Church of England.	At the trial Laud claimed credit for the appointment as bishop of Carlisle of Barnaby Potter, a strong Calvinist.
9	That after the dissolution of the last parliament, he had caused a convocation to be held, in which sundry canons were made contrary to the rights and privileges of parliament, and an illegal oath imposed upon the clergy, with certain penalties, commonly known by the et cetera oath.	That in or about the Month of May 1640, presently after the Dissolution of the last Parliament, the said Archbishop, for the ends and purposes aforesaid, caused a Synod or Convocation of the Clergy to be held for the several Provinces of Canterbury and York; wherein were made and established by his means and procurement divers Canons and Constitutions Ecclesiastical, contrary to the Laws of this Realm, the Rights and Privileges of Parliament, the Liberty and Property of the Subject, tending also to Sedition, and of dangerous Consequence: And amongst other things the said Archbishop caused a most dangerous and illegal Oath to be therein made and contrived, the Tenour whereof followeth in these Words: That I A. B. do swear, that I do approve the Doctrine and Discipline or Government establish'd in the Church of England, as containing all things necessary to Salvation; and that I will not endeavour by myself, or any other, directly or indirectly, to bring in any Popish Doctrine, contrary to that which is so established: Nor will I ever give my consent to alter the Government of this Church by Archbishops, Bishops, Deans, and Arch-Deacons, &c. as it stands now established, and as by right it ought to stand; nor yet ever to subject it to the Usurpations and Superstitions of the See of Rome. And all these things do I plainly and sincerely acknowledge and swear according to the plain and common Sense and Understanding of the same Words, without any Equivocation or mental Evasion, or secret Reservation whatsoever; and this I do heartily, willingly and truly, upon the Faith of a Christian: So help me God in Jesus Christ. Which Oath the said Archbishop himself did take, and caused divers other Ministers of the Church to take the same, upon pain of Suspension, and Deprivation of their Livings, and other severe Penalties; and did also cause Godfrey, then Bishop of Gloucester, to be committed to Prison, for refusing to subscribe to the said Canons, and to take the said Oath; and afterwards, the said Bishop submitting himself to take the said Oath, he was set at liberty.	
10	That upon the abrupt dissolving of the short parliament 1640, he had told the king, he was now absolved from all rules of government, and at liberty to make use of extraordinary methods for supply.	That a little before the calling of the last Parliament, Anno 1640. a Vote being then passed, and a Resolution taken at the Council-Table, by the Advice of the said Archbishop, for assisting of the King in extraordinary ways, if the said Parliament should prove peevish, and refuse to supply his Majesty; the said Archbishop wickedly and maliciously advised his Majesty to dissolve the said Parliament, and accordingly the same was dissolved: And presently after the said Archbishop told his Majesty, That now he was absolved from all Rules of Government, and left free to use extraordinary ways for his Supply.	

== The trial begins ==
The trial was precipitated by Laud's refusal to present Edward Corbet to a living. Oliver St John had a hand in reviving the stalled prosecution, in 1643, having regard to the views of the Scots and his own position. Legal proceedings were started in November 1643, but initial delays occupied some months. On 28 December, as Laud recorded, Isaac Penington whose father was Lieutenant of the Tower brought Thomas Weld to confront Laud in his room, asking "in a boisterous manner" whether Laud repented.

The trial proper began on 12 March 1644. The impeachment trial ran on to 29 July. It was in front of the House of Lords, which at this stage of the First English Civil War consisted of about a dozen peers.

The prosecution team consisted of Samuel Browne, John Maynard, Robert Nicholas, and John Wylde, with William Prynne acting as solicitor. Laud's legal team was made up of Chaloner Chute, Richard Gerrard, Matthew Hale, and John Herne. The first 20 days of the trial fell into a pattern of the prosecution presenting their case in the morning, a two-hour break, and Laud answering in the afternoon.

== Witnesses against Laud ==
- John Ashe.
- Edward Corbet testified to ritual innovations imposed at Merton College, Oxford.
- Daniel Featley testified to William Bray's censorship of his sermons.
- Thomas Foxley, imprisoned.
- Joshua Hoyle testified to religious changes at Trinity College Dublin.
- Thomas Hoyle
- George Huntley of Kent, clergyman imprisoned for nonconformity.
- Thomas Jackson, testified that Laud had tried to enforce bowing towards the altar.
- John Langley. He testified to changes Laud had made to ritual as Dean of Gloucester, and prejudice to the lecturer John Workman.
- Humphrey Mackworth.
- Anthony and Henry Mildmay testified that Laud had factional Catholic support in Rome and had eased the Church of England's relations with the Roman Catholic Church.
- Mary Oakes on behalf of her late husband John Oakes, a printer.
- Michael Oldisworth. He testified that the Earl of Pembroke as lord chamberlain had been obstructed by Laud in his right to appoint royal chaplains.
- Peter Smart testified to a comment of Augustine Lindsell, claiming ignorance on the part of Calvinist clergy who objected to Laudian innovations on altars.
- Michael Sparke.
- Samuel Vassall.
- Georg Rudolph Weckherlin.
- John White. He testified on the legal proceedings against the feoffees for impropriations, and actions taken against Edward Bagshaw. According to Prynne's account, he also mentioned changes made to the text of Richard Clerke's works by Laudians before their publication.
- Thomas Wilson.

The case of Richard Culmer was also placed in evidence. An example brought up relating to lay property rights was the abbacy of Arbroath.

== Attainder ==
In the end the impeachment proceedings were halted. On 30 October 1644 Parliament heard a sermon from Edmund Staunton, and the following day moved to the process of attainder. Prominent among the advocates of attainder was Sir Samuel Browne.

Laud was beheaded on Tower Hill on 10 January 1645.
