= Edward Corbet =

English clergyman

Edward Corbet (c. 1603 – 5 January 1658) was an English clergyman, and a member of the Westminster Assembly.

== Life ==
He was born at Pontesbury in Shropshire, and was educated at Shrewsbury and Merton College, Oxford, where he was admitted a probationer fellow in 1624. Meanwhile, he had taken his B.A. degree on 4 December 1622, and became proctor on 4 April 1638. At Merton he distinguished himself he resisted the attempted innovations of William Laud, and subsequently gave evidence at the archbishop's trial.

He was chosen one of the Westminster Assembly of divines, and a preacher before the Long parliament. He received the thanks of the house, and by an ordinance dated 17 May 1643 was instituted to the rectory of Chartham, Kent. He held this living until 1646, when he returned to Oxford as one of the seven ministers appointed by the parliament to preach the loyalist scholars into obedience. He was also elected one of the parliamentary visitors of the university, but rarely sat among them. On 20 January 1648 he was installed public orator and canon of the second stall in Christ Church, Oxford, in the place of the ejected Henry Hammond; he resigned both places in August, possibly for reasons of conscience. The same year he proceeded D.D. on 12 April. At the beginning of 1649 he was presented, on the death of Dr. Thomas Soame, to the rectory of Great Hasely, near Oxford.

Corbet married Margaret, daughter of Sir Nathaniel Brent, by whom he had three children, Edward, Martha, and Margaret. He died in London on 5 January 1658, aged about 55, and was buried on the 14th in the chancel of Great Hasely near his wife, who had died in 1656. By his will he left amongst other books Robert Abbot's Commentaries on Romans in manuscript.
