= George Abbot (bishop) =

Archbishop of Canterbury from 1611 to 1633

The Most Reverend and Right Honourable George Abbot
- Archbishop of Canterbury
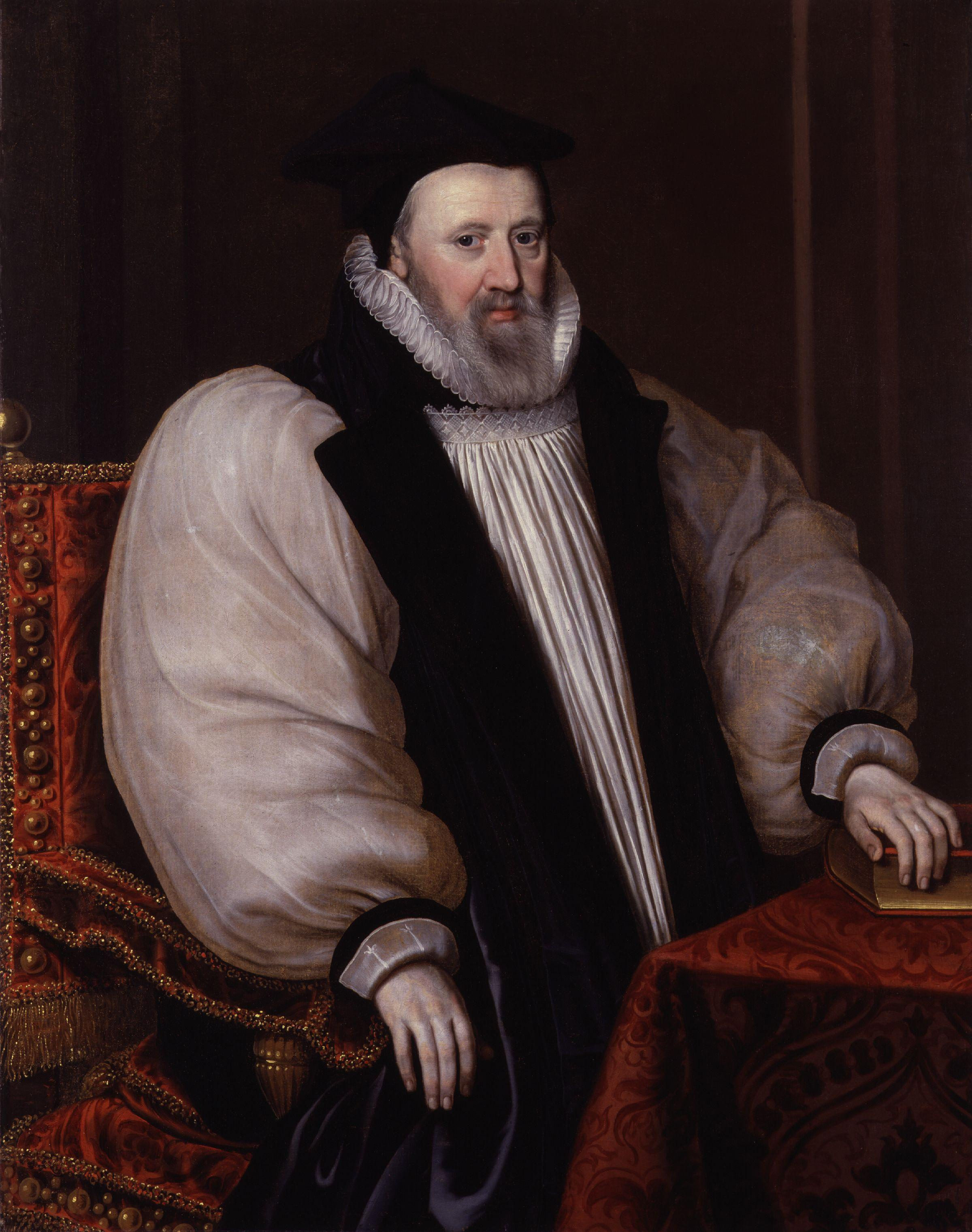
- Portrait in the National Portrait Gallery, 1623
- Church: Church of England
- Diocese: Canterbury
- Installed: 4 March 1611
- Term ended: 4 August 1633
- Predecessor: Richard Bancroft
- Successor: William Laud

Orders
- Consecration: 3 December 1609 by Richard Bancroft

Personal details
- Born: 29 October 1562 Guildford, Surrey, England
- Died: 4 August 1633 (aged 70) Croydon, Surrey, England
- Denomination: Anglican
- Parents: Maurice Abbot

George Abbot (29 October 1562 – 4 August 1633) (Note: Other sources, such as the 1911 Encyclopædia Britannica give his birth and death dates as 19 October 1562 – 5 August 1633, but the majority of sources state he was born 29 October 1562, and the date 4 August 1633 is inscribed on his tomb) was an English bishop who was Archbishop of Canterbury from 1611 to 1633. He also served as the fourth chancellor of the University of Dublin, from 1612 to 1633.

Chambers Biographical Dictionary describes him as "[a] sincere but narrow-minded Calvinist". Among his five brothers, Robert became Bishop of Salisbury and Maurice became Lord Mayor of London. He was a translator of the King James Version of the Bible.

== Life and career ==
=== Early years ===
Born at Guildford in Surrey, where his father Maurice Abbot (died 1606) was a cloth worker, he was taught at the Royal Grammar School, Guildford. According to an eighteenth-century biographical dictionary, when Abbot's mother was pregnant with him she had a dream in which she was told that if she ate a pike her child would be a son and rise to great prominence. Some time afterwards, she accidentally caught a pike while fetching water from the River Wey, and it "being reported to some gentlemen in the neighbourhood, they offered to stand sponsors for the child, and afterwards shewed him many marks of favour". He later studied and then taught under many eminent scholars, including Thomas Holland, at Balliol College, Oxford, was chosen Master of University College in 1597, and appointed Dean of Winchester in 1600. He was three times Vice-Chancellor of the University and took a leading part in preparing the authorised version of the New Testament. In 1608, he went to Scotland with George Home, 1st Earl of Dunbar to arrange for a union between the churches of England and Scotland. He so pleased King James in this affair that he was made Bishop of Lichfield and Coventry in 1609 and was translated to the see of London a month afterwards.

George had two brothers, Morris (or Maurice) who was governor of the East India Company, and William, Bishop of Winchester.

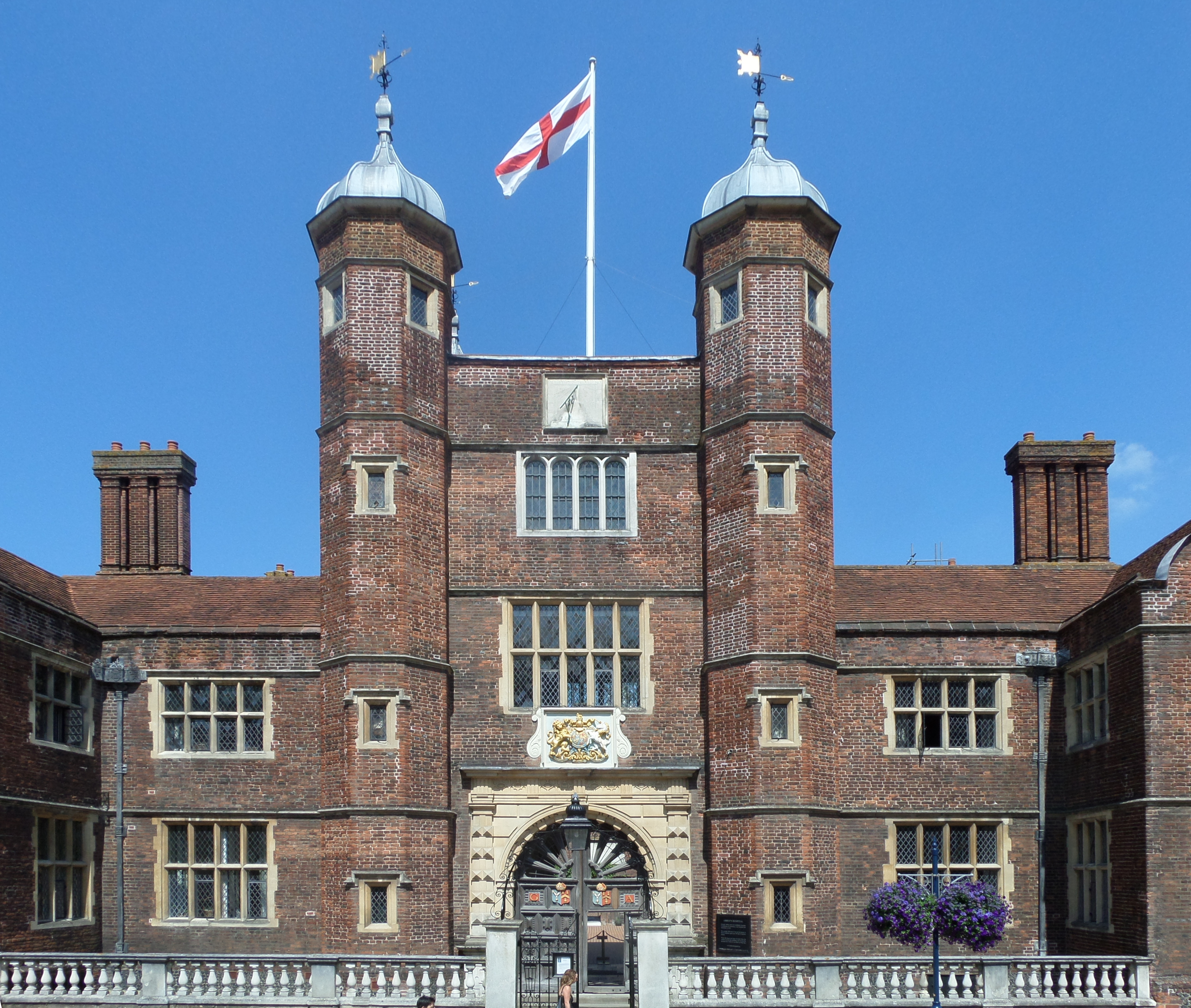
Abbot's Hospital in Guildford

== Archbishop of Canterbury ==
On 4 March 1611, Abbot was raised to the position of Archbishop of Canterbury by King James I. As archbishop, he defended the apostolic succession of Anglican bishops and the validity of the church's priesthood in 1614. In consequence of the Nag's Head Fable, the archbishop invited certain Roman Catholics to inspect the register in the presence of six of his episcopal colleagues, the details of which inspection were preserved. It was agreed by all parties that:

The register agrees in every particular with what we know of the history of the times, and there exists not the semblance of a reason for pronouncing it a forgery.

Despite his defence of the catholic nature of the priesthood, his Puritan instincts frequently led him not only into harsh treatment of Roman Catholics but also into courageous resistance to the royal will, such as when he opposed the scandalous divorce suit of the Lady Frances Howard against Robert Devereux, 3rd Earl of Essex, and again in 1618 when, at Croydon, he forbade the reading of the Declaration of Sports listing the permitted Sunday recreations. He was naturally, therefore, a promoter of the match between the king's daughter, Princess Elizabeth, and Frederick V, Elector Palatine, and a firm opponent of the projected marriage of the new Prince of Wales (later Charles I) and the Spanish Infanta, Maria Anna. This policy brought upon the archbishop the hatred of William Laud (with whom he had previously come into collision at Oxford) and the king's court, although the king himself never forsook Abbot.

=== Hunting accident ===
In July 1621, while hunting in Lord Zouch's park at Bramshill in Hampshire, a bolt from his cross-bow aimed at a deer happened to strike one of the keepers, who died within an hour, and Abbot was so greatly distressed by the event that he fell into a state of settled melancholia. John Chamberlain wrote "howsoever mischances may light anywhere, and cannot be prevented, yet what should a man of his place and profession be meddling with such edge-tools, and no doubt both his own ill-wishers and the common adversary will be ready enough to take advantage and make the worst construction". His enemies maintained that the fatal issue of this accident disqualified him for his office and argued that, though the homicide was involuntary, the sport of hunting that had led to it was one in which no clerical person could lawfully indulge.

The king had to refer the matter to a commission of ten, though he said that "an angel might have miscarried after this sort". The commission was equally divided, and the king voted in Abbot's favour, though also signing a formal pardon or dispensation. Gustavus Paine notes that Abbot was both the "only translator of the 1611 Bible and the only Archbishop of Canterbury ever to kill a human being". (Note: This ceased to be true, by some definitions, in 1980 with the appointment of former soldier and Military Cross recipient Robert Runcie. Abbot remains the only known Archbishop of Canterbury to kill while in office.)

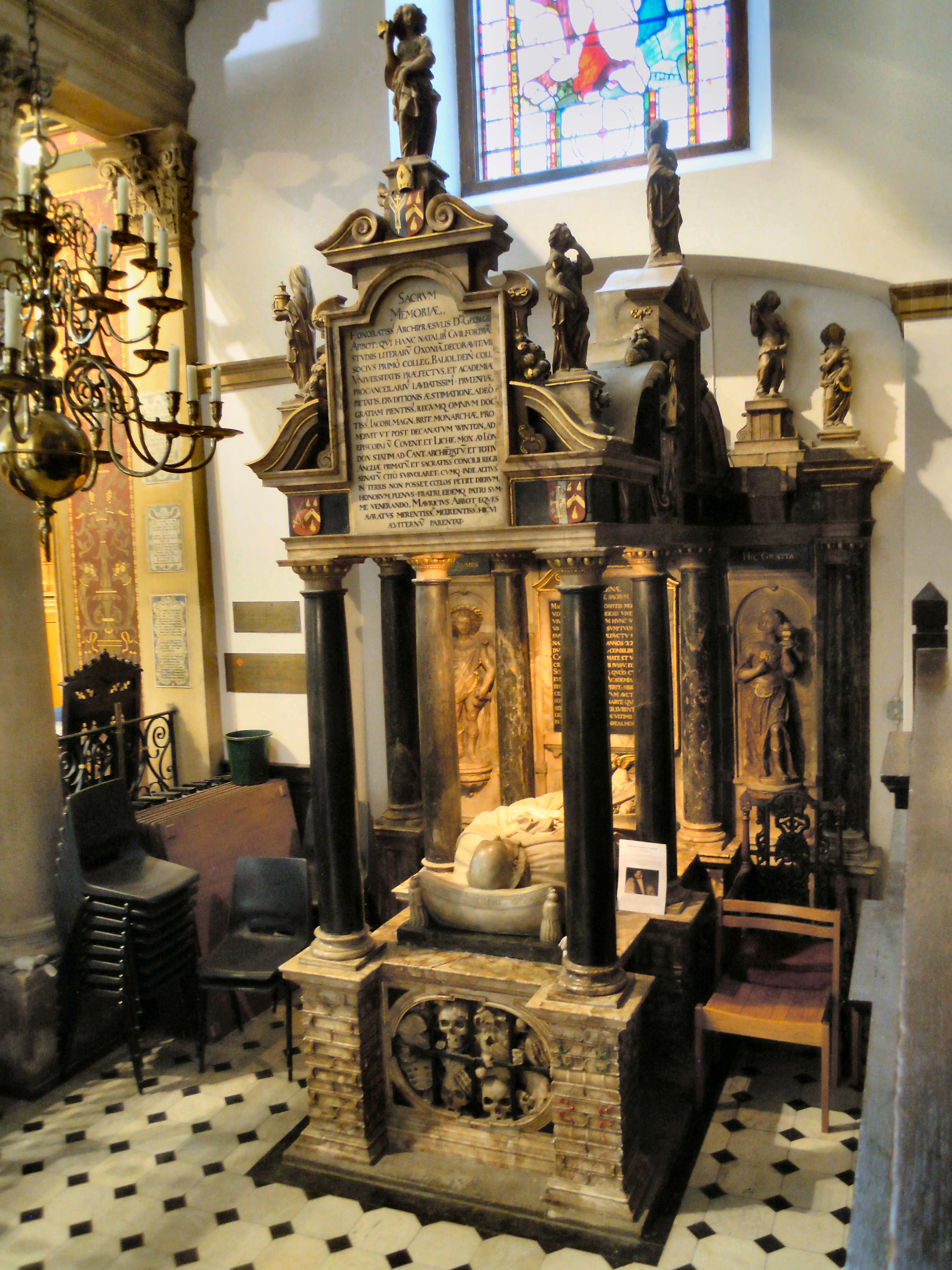
The tomb of George Abbot in Holy Trinity Church, Guildford

=== Later career ===
After this, Abbot seldom appeared at the council, chiefly because of his infirmities. In 1625, he attended the king constantly; however, in his last illness, he performed the coronation ceremony of King Charles I as king of England. His refusal to license the assize sermon preached by Robert Sibthorp at Northampton on 22 February 1627, in which cheerful obedience was urged to the king's demand for a general loan, and the duty proclaimed of absolute non-resistance even to the most arbitrary royal commands, led Charles to deprive him of his functions as primate, putting them in commission. However, the need to summon parliament soon brought about a nominal restoration of the archbishop's powers. His presence was unwelcome at court, and he lived from that time on retirement, leaving Laud and his party in undisputed ascendancy. He died at Croydon on 4 August 1633 and was buried at Guildford, his native place, where he had endowed Abbot's Hospital with lands valued at £300 a year.

== Legacy ==
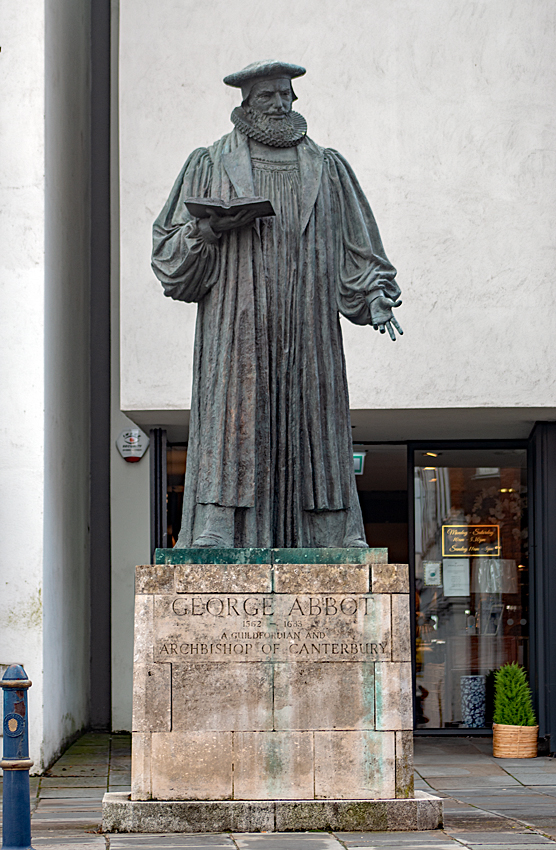
Abbot's statue in High Street, Guildford

Abbot was a conscientious prelate, though narrow in view and often harsh towards separatists and Roman Catholics. He wrote many works, the most interesting being his discursive Exposition on the Prophet Jonah (1600), which was reprinted in 1845. His Geography, or a Brief Description of the Whole World (1599) passed through numerous editions. The newest edition, edited by the current Master of the Abbot's Hospital, was published by Goldenford Publishers Ltd on 20 June 2011, to commemorate the 400th anniversary of his enthronement as Archbishop of Canterbury.

Abbot had an extensive private library of over 8000 volumes, most of which he left to Lambeth Palace Library. Books bearing his armorial stamp can still be found in libraries today.

Guildford remembers Abbot with his hospital and a statue in the High Street. The George Abbot School in Burpham and a pub in the High Street are named after him. His tomb can be found in Holy Trinity Church.

== Arms ==
Coat of arms of George Abbot

Notes
When Abbot was serving as a bishop his arms would be displayed impaled with the arms of the diocese and topped with a mitre.
Escutcheon
Gules, a chevron between three pears stalked Or.

== Notes ==
Academic offices
Preceded by Anthony Gate	Master of University College, Oxford; 1597–1610	Succeeded by John Bancroft
Preceded by Thomas Thornton	Vice-Chancellor of the University of Oxford; 1600–1601	Succeeded by George Ryves
Preceded by John Howson	Vice-Chancellor of the University of Oxford; 1603–1604	Succeeded by John Williams
Preceded by John Williams	Vice-Chancellor of the University of Oxford; 1605–1606	Succeeded by Henry Airay
Preceded by The Earl of Salisbury	Chancellor of the University of Dublin; 1612–1633	Succeeded by William Laud, Archbishop of Canterbury
Government offices
Preceded by The Earl of Suffolk (Lord High Treasurer)	First Lord of the Treasury; 1618–1620	Succeeded by The Earl of Manchester (Lord High Treasurer)
Church of England titles
Preceded by William Overton	Bishop of Lichfield and Coventry; 1609–1610	Succeeded by Richard Neile
Preceded by Thomas Ravis	Bishop of London; 1610–1611	Succeeded by John King
Preceded by Richard Bancroft	Archbishop of Canterbury; 1611–1633	Succeeded by William Laud
