= St Mary's Church, Acton, London =

Church in the London Borough of Ealing

Coordinates: 51°30′28″N 0°16′19″W

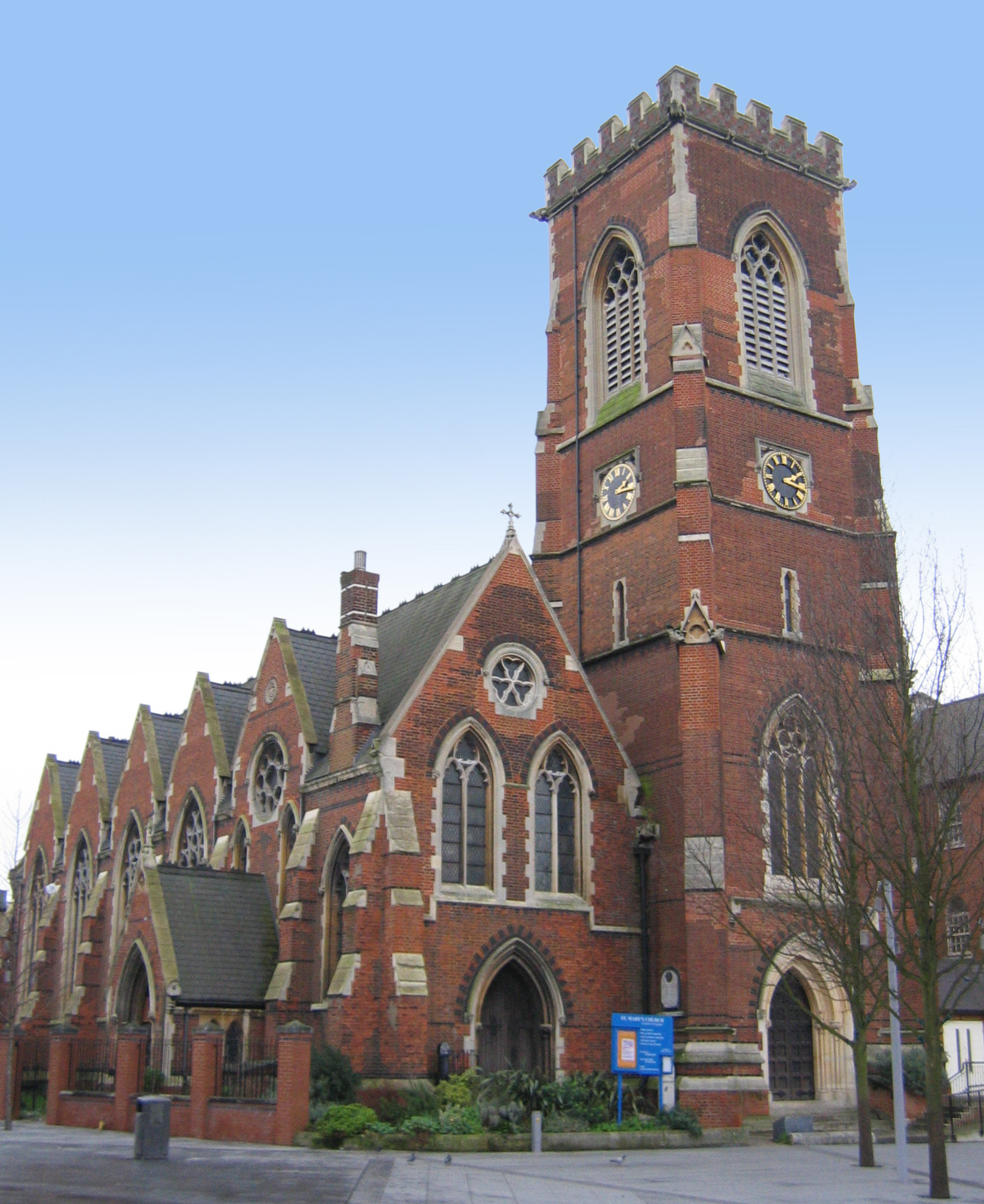
St Mary's Church, Acton

St Mary's Church is a Church of England parish church in Acton in the London Borough of Ealing. The present church, in red brick with stone dressings in a decorated style, was designed by Horace Francis and constructed 1865–1867. The church was listed Grade II in 1981.

== Overview ==
The church is dedicated to St Mary of the Visitation.

A church dedicated to St Mary in Acton was first recorded in 1231. The medieval church was altered and repaired several times over the centuries.

In 1642, the church was damaged by Roundhead soldiers after the Battle of Turnham Green: the font was defaced, windows smashed, the chancel rails taken into the street to be burnt, and most of the memorial brasses destroyed. They also set fire to the rectory outbuildings, objecting to the ceremonial practice of the rector, Daniel Featley. Featley, a Calvinist anti-Laudian but a royal chaplain and a defender of the Church of England, twice escaped assassination, and was ejected from the living of Acton in 1643. Featley and his replacement Philip Nye were both members of the Westminster Assembly, Featley arguing for episcopalianism (the existing system of church governance by bishops), Nye arguing for congregationalism (autonomous churches).

To meet the needs of a growing local population, the church was remodelled in 1837, then demolished (except the tower) in 1865 and completely rebuilt in 1865–1867. The new church was consecrated on 16 May 1866 by Samuel Wilberforce, Bishop of Oxford. In 1876, the tower was rebuilt, paid for by Frederic Ouvry in memory of his sister, and a new clock was installed.

The parish is in the Deanery of Ealing, in the Archdeaconry of Northolt, in the Willesden Episcopal Area of the Diocese of London.

== Rectors of St Mary's, Acton ==
https://archive.org/details/b24886816/page/36/mode

- 1486–1542† John Byrde
- 1542–1563 Hugh Turnbull (as Dean of Chichester from 1558)
- 1563–1576† Ralph Cockerell (previously MP for Ludgershall)
- 1576–1627† John Kendall
- 1627–1643 Daniel Featley (ejected)
- 1643–1656 Philip Nye
- 1656–1661 Thomas Elford (ejected at the Restoration)
- 1661–1677† Bruno Ryves (as Dean of Windsor)
- 1677–1720† Anthony Saunders (as Chancellor of St Paul's Cathedral)
- 1720–1726† William Hall
- 1726–1764† Edward Cobden (as Archdeacon of London from 1742)
- 1764–1768 George Berkeley (son of Bishop Berkeley, husband of Eliza Berkeley)
- 1768–1797† Philip Cocks
- 1797–1853† William Antrobus
- 1853–1859† John Smith
- 1859–1869 Edward Parry (later Bishop of Dover)
- 1869–1896 Charles Musgrave Harvey
- 1896–1924 George Spencer de Sausmarez
- 1928–1955† Percival Gough
- 1955–1981 M. Richard Parsons
- 1982–1995† Richard Jones
- 1996–2008 Jacqueline Fox
- 2008–2014 David Brammer
- 2015–2021 Nick Jones
- 2023–2025 Joseph Fernandes

† Rector died in post

== Memorials ==
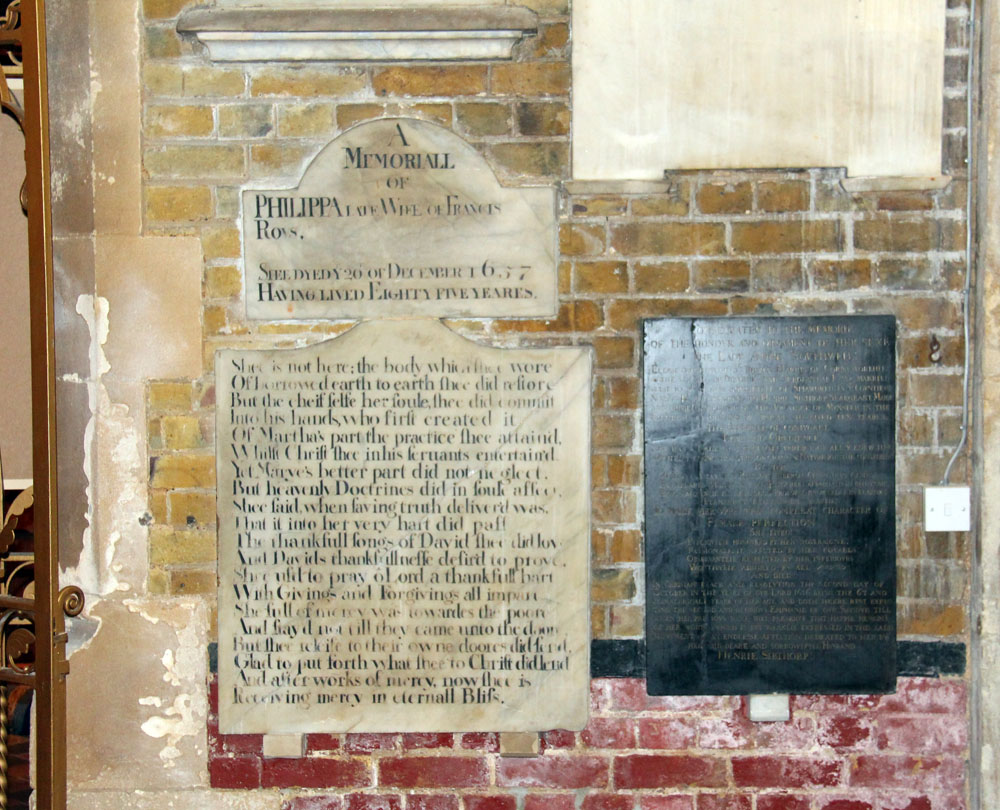
Memorial to Philippa Rous (died 1657), with the titles of her husband Francis erased

Several memorials survive from the old church, including those to:

- Humphrey Cavell MP (died 1558), a local lawyer who left money for a mass to be said for his soul each week for a year after his burial – a monumental brass.
- Anne Southwell (died 1636), poet.
- Catherine, Viscountess Conway (died 1639), wife of Edward Conway, 1st Viscount Conway; an extensive investor in New World ventures including the Virginia Company and a local benefactor by her will dated 1637.
- Mary Skippon (died 1655), wife of Major-General Philip Skippon MP, Parliamentarian commander during the Civil War.
- John Perryn (died 1656), benefactor.
- Philippa Rous (died 1657), wife of Francis Rous MP, Puritan religious author and Speaker of the House of Commons – her husband's titles were later erased from the monument by royalists.
- Elizabeth Barry (died 1713), actress.
