= Thomas Hayley =

Thomas Hayley may refer to:

- Thomas Hayley (priest), Church of England dean
- Thomas Alphonso Hayley, English sculptor
