= Thomas Whyte (academic) =

English clergyman and academic

Thomas Whyte (or White; c. 1514 – 12 June 1588) was an English clergyman and academic at the University of Oxford.

Whyte was educated at Winchester College, where he gained a scholarship aged 12 in 1526, and New College, Oxford, holding a fellowship 1532–1553, and graduating B.C.L. 1541, D.C.L. 1553.

Whyte was elected warden (head) of New College, Oxford, in 1553, a post he held until 1573. He was twice vice-chancellor of Oxford University during 1557–8 and 1562–4.

He was archdeacon of Berkshire from 1557 and chancellor of Salisbury Cathedral from 1571, holding both offices until his death.

Whyte died on 12 June 1588, and was buried in Salisbury Cathedral.

Academic offices
Preceded by Ralph Skinner	Warden of New College, Oxford; 1553–1573	Succeeded by Martin Culpepper
Preceded by Thomas Raynolds	Vice-Chancellor of Oxford University; 1557–1558	Succeeded by William Tresham
Preceded by Francis Babington	Vice-Chancellor of Oxford University; 1562–1564	Succeeded by John Kennall
Church of England titles
Preceded by William Pye	Archdeacon of Berkshire; 1557–1588	Succeeded by Martin Culpepper
