= Thomas Ball (archdeacon of Chichester) =

The Venerable Thomas Ball (c. 1697 – 19 July 1770) was the son of Lawrence Ball, of Eccleston, Lancashire, and a Church of England clergyman.

== Family ==
Thomas Ball married Margaret Mill (1712–1783) in Greatham, Sussex, on 8 July 1732 when he was 36 years old, they had at least four children, one of which, Ann Ball born 1738, married Charles Harward (1723–1802) in 1763, who was his successor as Dean of Chichester Cathedral in 1770. Another daughter Elizabeth Ball (1750–1797) married William Hayley (1745–1820) the poet, whose great uncle was William Haley the Dean of Chichester Cathedral from 1699 to 1715.

== Education ==
Ball matriculated in 1715 at age 18. He then went on to study at Brasenose College, Oxford where he was awarded his B.A. degree in 1719. He received his M.A. from Gonville and Caius College, Cambridge in 1726.

== Career ==
Ball was ordained in 1723 and became vicar of Boxgrove, a village near Chichester, the same year. This was a living he held for 30 years. While at Boxgrove he took a year out to be a schoolmaster in Carolina between 1725 and 1726. He was prebendary of Hampstead from 1727 to 1730, and prebendary of Eartham from 1730. Ball became a residentiary canon at Chichester Cathedral in 1735 and was offered, but declined, the office of dean in 1741. In 1736 he was appointed archdeacon of Chichester. Ball failed to secure the deanery of Worcester so when nominated to be dean of Chichester (again) in 1754 he accepted it. He also continued in his post as archdeacon of Chichester.

The career of Thomas Ball reveals a close linking of the political and ecclesiastical life of Sussex in the middle of the 18th century. Dean Ball and his chapter were major supporters of the Whig Party in the county and for the Duke of Newcastle and his family. The key role of Ball was indicated in a letter from Newcastle to the Duke of Richmond in 1740, where he said "I reckon he [Ball] is the best agent we have in our parts, and will do whatever you have Him..".

Thomas Ball died on 19 July 1770 and is buried in Chichester Cathedral.

== Notes ==
Church of England titles
Preceded by William Ashburnham	Dean of Chichester; 1754–1770	Succeeded by Charles Harward
