= Jonathan Newey =

Jonathan Newey (c1637-1716) was curate of Kinver (1665-1716).

== Life ==
Jonathan Newey was educated at Pembroke College, Oxford, matriculating 25 July 1655 and awarded his BA on 12 February 1659. He was married to Mary. Their elder son, John Newey (4 December 1664 – 13 September 1735), became Dean of Chichester Cathedral. While at Kinver, their children were Elizabeth (bap. 1666, d. 1675), Deanes (bap. 1669, d. 1671), Anne (bap. 1672), Sarah (bap. 1674), Katherine (bap. 1676), Frances (bap. 1678, d. 5 September 1728) was married (20 June 1699) to Edward Waddington, Bishop of Chichester, Samuel (bap. 1681).

== Career ==
Newey was ordained on 17 September 1661 by Thomas Sydserf, Bishop of Galloway. He was licensed as a preacher in the Diocese of Coventry and Lichfield (10 December 1663) and appointed to the curacy of Kinver on 4 August 1665 on the nomination of twenty parishioners led by William Talbot and after the ejection of Richard Morton. Newey was instituted (26 June 1704) as non-resident Rector of Doverdale (Diocese of Worcester) at the invitation of William Lloyd, Bishop of Worcester and former Bishop of Coventry and Lichfield.

Newey’s theological position is not clear. His appointment to Kinver came with the restoration of the monarchy and the ejection of puritan ministers from Church of England parishes. He must have taken the oath of allegiance to William III rather than joining the nonjuror faction. Newey’s theological views seems to have been sympathetic to the puritan faction. When Revd Joseph Eccleshall moved to Kinver, having been forced by the Oxford Act to leave his parish of Sedgeley, Eccleshall preached to his followers in private then accompanied them to Kinver church “to hear Mr Jonathan Newey,’ a worthy man’”.

In 1677, Newey was one of several ministers involved in the case of John Duncalf. Duncalf was, by his own admission, a petty criminal who stole bibles, amongst other things. On one occasion, denying a theft of a bible, he cursed himself wishing that his hands would fall off before he died if he had stolen the bible. Soon afterwards, his hands and feet began to rot and fall off and he subsequently died. This was attributed to divine judgement although modern medicine might diagnose dry gangrene. During Duncalf’s last illness, he was visited by several ministers, including Jonathan Newey who contributed to a book about this case. The popularity of the book is witnessed by the numerous editions produced from 1678 to 1750. (Note: Ian Atherton has published a much fuller study of John Duncalf's death, the actions and reactions of the locals and the subsequent publication history.)

Jonathan Newey provided in his will for the founding of a charity school and for the poor of Kinver. In 1717, Mary Newey provided an income for the charity as directed in his will. Although cottages in Whittington were acquired by the trustees, there is no evidence that the school was ever established. The cottages seem to have been used as poorhouses by the nineteenth century (and perhaps as early as 1758). Jonathan and Mary Newey presented a large silver chalice to Kinver church engraved with "J.N.M.".
