= Martin Culpepper =

English clergyman, medical doctor, and academic

Martin Culpepper (or Culpeper or Colepeper; c. 1540 – 10 October 1605) was an English clergyman, medical doctor, and academic at the University of Oxford.

== Life ==
Culpepper was educated at Winchester College, where he gained a scholarship aged 13 in 1554, and New College, Oxford, holding a fellowship 1559–1567, and graduating B.A. 1562, M.A. 1566, B.Med. 1568, D.Med. 1571.

He was elected Warden (head) of New College, Oxford in 1573, holding the post until 1599.

During his time as Warden of New College, he was also Vice-Chancellor of the University of Oxford in 1578–9.

In the church, he held these livings:

- Rector of Stanton St. John, Oxfordshire (1576)
- Dean of Chichester (1577–1601)
- Rector of Colerne, Wiltshire (1588)
- Archdeacon of Berkshire and Rector of North Moreton then in that county (1588–1605)

He acquired the manor of Astwood in Feckenham, Worcestershire in 1595, he and his brother Walter taking a 1,000-year lease.

He died on 10 October 1605 and was buried in Feckenham.

== Family ==
He married Lettice, daughter of Humphrey Clarke of Westhawke, near Ashford, Kent. They had two sons and a daughter:

- Sir Martin Culpepper (died 1604), knighted 12 May 1604; married Joyce Aston, daughter of Sir Edward Aston; buried at Feckenham church
- Stephen Culpepper (died 1611)
- Mercy Culpepper (died 1629), married Sir Samuel Sandys MP, Lord of Ombersley Manor, Worcestershire, a son of Edwin Sandys, Archbishop of York.

Academic offices
Preceded by Thomas Whyte	Warden of New College, Oxford; 1573–1599	Succeeded by George Ryves
Preceded by William Cole	Vice-Chancellor of the University of Oxford; 1578–1579	Succeeded by Tobias Matthew
Church of England titles
Preceded by Anthony Rushe	Dean of Chichester; 1577–1601	Succeeded by William Thorne
Preceded by Thomas Whyte	Archdeacon of Berkshire; 1588–1605	Succeeded by Leonel Sharp
