= Thomas Bowers (bishop) =

Anglican bishop of Chichester (1660–1724)

Thomas Bowers (1660–1724) was an Anglican bishop of Chichester. The son of Mr. Richard Bowers, a draper of Shrewsbury, he was educated at Shrewsbury School and St. John's College, Cambridge.

== Education ==
Thomas Bowers was educated at Shrewsbury School, he matriculated on 13 June 1677, aged 17, and studied at St John's College, Cambridge as a sizar . He was awarded his BA in 1680 – 1681. He received his M.A., in 1684 and his DD(Lambeth) in 1716.

== Career ==
Thomas Bowers became a deacon at Norwich in June 1682, he was ordained on 20 December 1684 and appointed vicar of Hooe on 5 January 1687. On 5 September 1693 Bowers was appointed rector of Burwash then between 1705 – 1707 he was chaplain at Morden College, Blackheath, London. In 1715 he was awarded the Prebendary of Canterbury, then in 1721 he was appointed Archdeacon of Canterbury a post that held in commendam with that of Bishop of Chichester, which he held from 1722 till his death on 22 August 1724.

== Bishop Bowers' Survey 1724 ==
Bishop Bowers' Survey 1724 was a survey to enable Bowers to run his diocese more efficiently. The survey was carried out in Sussex, parish by parish during the summer of 1724. Each incumbent was presented with 13 questions. The questions were wideranging. They included questions to ascertain the state of buildings and their fittings; the population of the parish, the strength of Nonconformity and Roman Catholicism, and provide details of patronage and parochial charities.

Example: survey results for the Parish of Rusper:

1. RUSPER – Rectory
2. Patron: Mr THOMAS MARCHANT.
3. Incumbent:
  Mr William Martin A.M. of Brazen Nose (College) in Oxford instituted into the living 19 December 1721.
4. Condition of Church, bible, Common Prayer book Communion plate and cloath....poor box and chest for surplice etc., number of bells:
  Church in good order.
  Bible and Common Prayer book very well. Pewter flaggon, Silver cup and cover for the Communion Chest to put the surplice in.
  No poor box. Pulpit cloth (and) cushion, table cloth for the Communion (table), and a cloth for it at other times, all very well.
  Bells, 6, all in good order.
5. Chancell in good order, repairable by the Rector.
6. The mansion house and barn in good and sufficient repair
7. The number of families in parish, any papists or Protestant dissenters:
  65 families 5 Anabaptists and 3 Quakers.
8. What benefactions or gifts have been bestowed on the Church or parish? None
9. Has anything been given to augment the living? None
10. The value of the living in the King's Books and whether discharged from the first fruits by the late Act of Parliament:
  King's Books £9.10s.0d Real value about £70 per annum.
11. Frequency of services:
  Divine service and sermon every Lord's Day in the morning and catechising in the summer afternoons by the incumbent.
12. The Sacrament is administered 4 times in the year.
  Number of communicants usually about 20 or 30.
13. The glebe about 35 acres whereof about 6 coppice. But note the neighbours surrounding it will not allow the Rector a way to it as yet. We find also the church marks miserably down, so as to lay the churchyard almost in common. Ordered to be repaired.
  (Source: Bishop Bowers's Visitation Book Ep/I/26/3, West Sussex Records Office )

The survey indicated that most of the churches in the diocese were in a good state of repair and had adequate plates and vestments.

In 1676 Henry Compton, the Bishop of London had taken a national census, known as the Compton Census, to ascertain the Catholic and Protestant nonconformists in the country. The figures from Bowers survey, indicated that compared to the Compton Census of 1676, the nonconformists in Sussex had dropped from about 4,300 to around 3,300 in 1724.

== Patronage ==
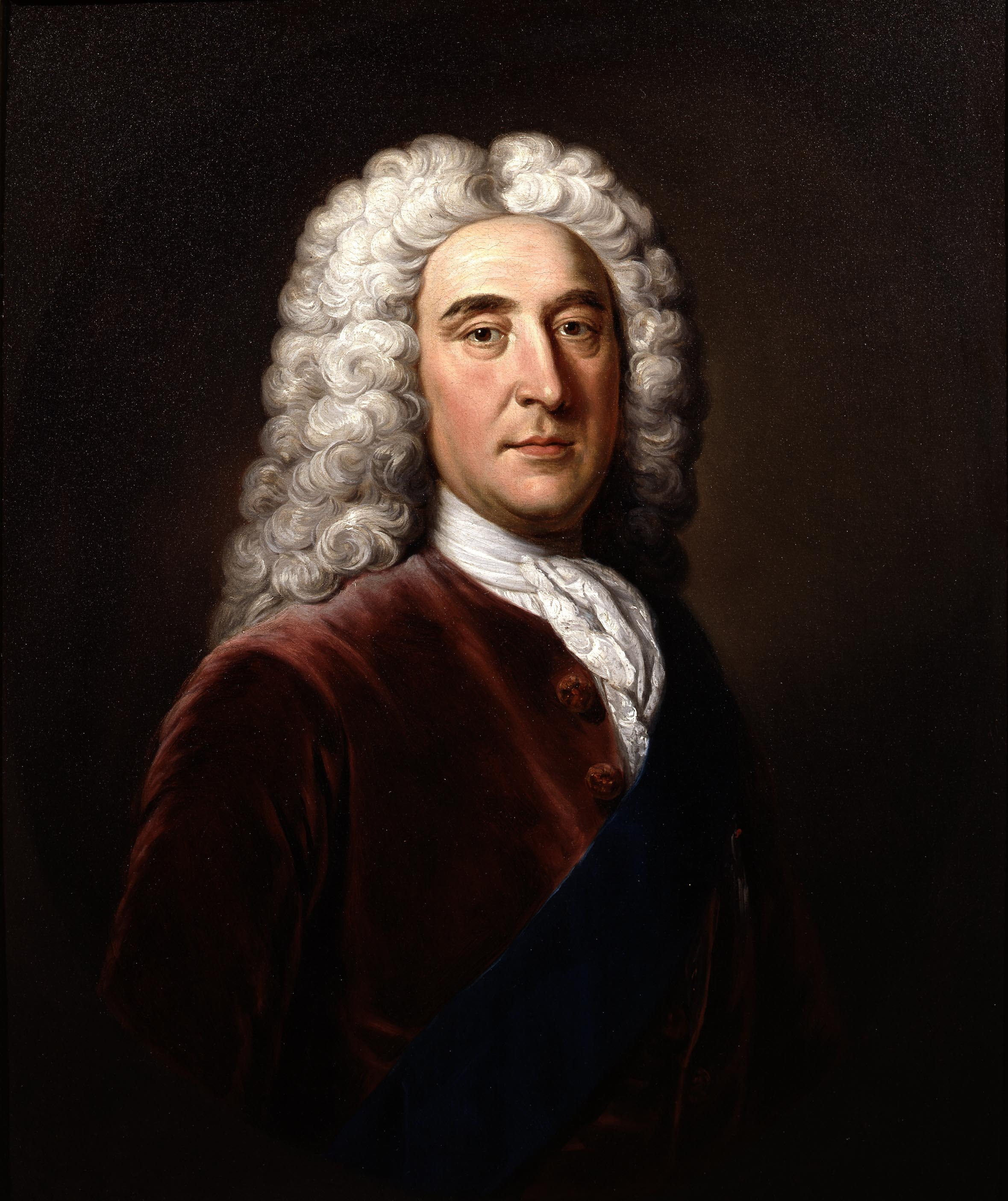
Thomas Pelham-Holles, Duke of Newcastle

The Whig politician Thomas Pelham was the member of an influential Sussex family. It was through his family contacts that Pelham built a network of patronage and influence amongst the clergymen of Sussex.

Thomas Pelham's grandfather, John Pelham, had appointed Thomas Bowers to the Rectory at Burwash in 1693. The Pelham family seat was at Halland close to Burwash, and it is likely that Bowers would have been a frequent visitor. It is thought that he would have tutored the young Thomas at this time.

Thomas Pelham inherited the estates of both his father and also his uncle John Holles, 1st Duke of Newcastle-upon-Tyne. He was also created the 1st Duke of Newcastle-under-Lyne and appended Holles to his name to become Thomas Pelham-Holles.

Thomas Bowers rose rapidly through the ecclesiastical ranks, probably with the dukes help. Bowers was the first avowed Whig bishop, who was a strong supporter of the Hanoverian cause in the Chichester diocese and was the first in a series of Newcastle appointees.

The bishop was as keen as Newcastle to appoint clergy who were sympathetic to their cause, and wrote to the duke, in 1723, suggesting that any men so nominated should be "worthy with unblemished characters". Presumably not too many men were advanced as Bowers died in 1724 the year after, however the precedent of patronage was continued by many of his successors.

== Notes ==
Church of England titles
Preceded by Thomas Manningham	Bishop of Chichester; 1722–1724	Succeeded by Edward Waddington
