= John Stein (physiologist) =

British physiologist

Professor John Stein FRCP FMedSci
- Born: John Frederick Stein; February 1941 (age 85)
- Awards: Fellow of the Royal College of Physicians
- Scientific career
- Workplaces: University of Oxford
- Doctoral students: Daniel Wolpert

John Frederick Stein (born February 1941) is a British physiologist and academic. He is Emeritus Professor of Physiology at the University of Oxford and a fellow of Magdalen College, Oxford. His research has focussed on sensorimotor control, the cerebellum, deep brain stimulation for Parkinson's disease and the neurological basis of dyslexia. Stein was elected as a Fellow of the Academy of Medical Sciences in 2014.

== Biography ==
Stein was born in February 1941. He was educated at Winchester College. He read Animal Physiology at New College, Oxford, followed by an MSc in Neural Control of Respiration in the Oxford University Laboratory of Physiology. He completed Clinical Medicine at St Thomas' Hospital, London, followed by a specialism in Neurology. He was appointed Tutor in Medicine at Magdalen College, Oxford, in 1970, retiring from that post in 2008. Stein is the brother of the chef and restaurateur Rick Stein, the father of artist Lucy Stein and the uncle of DJ Judge Jules.

Stein is the chair of the Dyslexia Research Trust. He is also a trustee of the Institute for Food, Brain and Behaviour, now rebranded as Think Through Nutrition, and is Chair of the Institute's Science Advisory Council.

Stein came into the public eye when Gordon Brown suggested a student had been discriminated against because of her state school education as she was not offered a place at Magdalen College, Oxford, despite the fact that she had comparable qualifications to the accepted applicants, who came from a broad range of backgrounds.

Stein is active in furthering the medical benefits of animal testing, speaking at pro-testing rallies and demonstrations, and has defended animal testing in high-profile television interviews.

== Research ==
Stein has published over 450 research articles in scientific journals, covering a wide range of fields in physiology and neuroscience with applications to medical practice.

=== Dyslexia research ===
Stein has provided evidence in support of the magnocellular theory of developmental dyslexia, arguing that dyslexia is caused by impaired visual and auditory timing systems due to impaired development of magnocellular neurons on which they depend. He has supervised many medical and physiology students at the University of Oxford conducting laboratory work investigating the theory. Stein's research has provided an evidence basis for using colour filters to treat reading difficulties. Alongside his former D.Phil. student, Joe Taylor, Stein has proposed that increasing noradrenergic output from the locus coeruleus via a subcortical irradiance detection pathway may prove effective in the treatment of the condition.

=== Sensorimotor Control ===
Along with Tipu Aziz, Stein was instrumental in developing deep brain stimulation as a successful treatment for Parkinson's disease following proof-of-concept experiments in non-human primates. With his former doctoral student Daniel Wolpert, Stein unified experimental and neurological observations of cerebellar function via the theory that the cerebellum contains an internal model that predicts both the outcomes of motor commands and the temporal delay of expected sensory feedback.

=== Nutrition ===
Stein has advocated the importance of nutrition for brain development and function, in particular the role of long chain omega-3 fatty acids in maintaining the function of magnocells. Stein has investigated how fish oil and other nutritional supplements can improve behaviour and impulse control in schoolchildren and young offenders.
