= William Hayley (priest) =

English priest

William Hayley (1683–1715) of Cleobury Mortimer, Salop was a Church of England priest and dean of Chichester Cathedral.

== Education ==
Hayley matriculated at the age of 15 and went on to become a fellow of All Souls College, Oxford. He was awarded a BA in 1676, MA in 1680 and DD in 1695.

== Career ==
William Hayley was ordained in September 1683. He was chaplain to Sir William Trumbull the ambassador to Constantinople (modern day Istanbul) and Paris.

Hayley was also chaplain to King William III. In 1695 he was instituted Rector of St Giles in the Fields, London. Then in 1699 he was appointed Dean of Chichester Cathedral, a post he held until his death in 1715.

== Family ==
Hayley's father, who was also called William, originally came from Bridgnorth but moved to Cleobury-Mortimer where he married a Catherine Bach. Hayley was one of their seven children.

Hayley married the daughter of Sir Thomas Mears and had one son Thomas and a daughter Anne. He died at his house in Great Russell Street on 30 October 1715 and is buried in the chancel of St Giles in the Fields. William's younger brother, Thomas also became Dean of Chichester Cathedral. William was great uncle to the writer William Hayley.

According to Mark Anthony Lower, Dean Hayley procured the patent of arms borne by the Hayley family.

Escutcheon of Hayley of Shropshire (1701)

== Citations ==
Church of England titles
Preceded by Francis Hawkins	Dean of Chichester; 1699 – 1715	Succeeded by Thomas Sherlock
