= John Treadgold =

John David Treadgold, LVO (30 December 1931 – 15 February 2015) was an Anglican priest.

He was born on 30 December 1931 and educated at the University of Nottingham, he was ordained after a period of study at Wells Theological College in 1960. He was the Vicar Choral at Southwell Minster and then held incumbencies at Wollaton and St Cuthbert's Church, Darlington. A canon at St. George's Chapel, Windsor Castle, he became Dean of Chichester in 1989, retiring in 2001. A carved gargoyle at Chichester Cathedral was inspired by his face.

He died on 15 February 2015.

Church of England titles
Preceded by Robert Tinsley Holtby	Dean of Chichester; 1989 – 2001	Succeeded by Nicholas Frayling
