= Charles Harward =

Charles Harward ( 1 August 1723 - 15 July 1802) was an Anglican priest, born in Hayne House Plymtree, Devon.

== Family ==
Charles Harward married Ann Ball (1738–1785) on 24 March 1763 at Saint Martins in the Fields, Westminster, London. Ann was the daughter of Thomas Ball (1698–1770) Dean of Chichester Cathedral and his wife Margaret (maiden name Mill (1712–1783).

Charles and Ann had a daughter Elisabeth Margaret Harward (1764–1796). Elisabeth married the Rev. William Blake (1763–1812) the Rector of Braunton, Devon. Charles and Ann also had three other children, Ann Augusta Harward (1765–1847), Charles Harward (1766–1816) and John Harward (1767–1791).

After Ann died, Charles married Louisa Yonge (1730–1811), on 16 November 1785, who was the daughter of Sir William Yonge, 4th Baronet of Escot (1693–1755) and his second wife Anne Howard, the daughter and coheiress of Thomas Howard, 6th Baron Howard of Effingham.

== Education ==
Harward matriculated from school, the family thinks this was Blundell's School in Tiverton, in 1742, he then went on to study at Clare College, Cambridge where he was awarded a B.A. in 1745/46 this was followed by his M.A. in 1755.

== Career ==
From 1755 to 1762 Harward was Rector of Whiston with moiety of Denton, Northamptonshire.

In 1770 he was appointed Dean of Chichester.

One of Chichester's residents, at the time of Harward, was John Marsh a gentleman, composer, diarist and writer. He recorded some pretty uncomplimentary details about Harward in his diary suggesting that 'Dean Howard was as little of a gentleman as he was a divine'. He also said that:

... Dr Harward, a man much fitter to be at the head of a regiment than of a Chapter; being a very headstrong, passionate man and much given to swearing, dealing out his oaths to the vergers whenever he had the least cause of complaint. He was also a very litigious man, and was remarkably irreverent in his behaviour in church, frequently talking during the lesson ...

During Harward's time at Chichester one of the chapter, a Dr. Hurdis, died in early 1784. It was the dean and the remaining members of the chapters responsibility to find a replacement. Consequently, a meeting was held on 1 August 1784 by the dean and the other three members of the chapter to elect a new member to replace the late Dr Hurdis Harward and one of the members of the chapter, a Rev. William Webber, voted for a Rev. John Buckner; the other members of the chapter, the Rev. Combe Miller and Rev. John Courtail voted for the Rev. George Metcalf. It was not accepted that Harward had a casting vote so a stalemate ensued. There followed several more meetings to try and resolve the issue but to no avail, so Miller and Courtail petitioned the bishop to settle the matter. The bishop arranged for Dean Harward and the chapter to appear before him on 12 January 1785 to explain why they had not appointed a new member of the chapter, and as they had not why the bishop should not appoint someone himself. At the hearing the bishop was not persuaded by their arguments so appointed George Metcalf. The dean and Webber refused to accept this decision, but the bishop demanded that they accept his candidate on pain of excommunication. However this was not the end of the matter as the dean and Webber took out a court order restraining the bishop from proceeding. The case was eventually heard by the Court of Kings Bench on 27 April 1787. The court agreed with the dean and Webber's argument and found that it was not in the bishop's power to appoint people over the dean and chapter. The court issued a mandamus to compel the dean and chapter to fill the vacancy, and on such a mandamus the court said that it "will compel an election at the peril of those who refuse."

It seems that despite all, the bishop's candidate George Metcalf remained in post. Harward resigned as dean of Chichester in 1790. He was elected Dean of Exeter on 16 July 1790, and confirmed 13 August 1790. His appointment as Dean of Exeter allowed him to return to Hayne House, the family seat, in Plymtree, Devon.

In Plymtree while living at Hayne House he added the family coat of arms with the motto "Crux Vincit Mundum" (the cross wins the world), above the front door. The Arms consist of a silver cross, each arm of which also forms a cross, with a blue ring in the centre of each crossing and in the centre, and four teardrops surrounding it all on a red ground. The original motto was 'Nec Cupias Nec Metua' meaning ' Neither Desire or Fear'. Dean Charles Harward was keen farmer and also a sporting parson; but much of his time was spent at the Court of King George III, where he acted as Chaplain to Princess Augusta of Saxe-Gotha, Princess of Wales, and tutor to the children of many important courtiers. He was a large drinker, with a particular taste for the excellent local cider. In the 'Pound House' he had a cider press and 'apple engine' and five vats to receive the brew; the pound chamber cellar held eight large butts, eight cider pipes and 34 hogsheads for storing cider, plus other barrels for the beer which was made in his fully equipped brew house. It was said that the Dean exercised discipline in the cathedral with a beady eye - 'and by judicious spitting at any choirboy who fell asleep during his services'. He left some of his property to his daughter Elizabeth's son Rev Charles Blake, who had to change his surname to Harward in 1816 in order to inherit.

He died at Hayne House, on 15 July 1802, age 79.

== Notes ==
Church of England titles
| Preceded by Thomas Ball | Dean of Chichester; 1770–1790 | Succeeded by Combe Miller |
