= Combe Miller =

Church of England clergyman

Combe Miller (1745 – 18 February 1814) was a Church of England clergyman. He was the third son of Sir John Miller, 4th Baronet Miller of Froyle and Susan Combe.

== Education ==
Miller studied at New College, Oxford and was awarded a Bachelor of Arts degree on 14 January 1768, he received his Master of Arts degree on 14 March 1771.

== Career ==
Miller was appointed Prebendary of Wyndham, a Canon residentiary of Chichester Cathedral, in 1769.

While a residentiary, an issue arose at the cathedral that he was involved in. After the death of one of the other canons residentiary on 29 March 1784 a meeting was held on 1 August 1784 by the remaining four members of the chapter to elect a replacement for the late Dr. Hurdis. The Dean Rev. Charles Harward and one of the residentiaries a Rev. William Webber, voted for the prebendary of Eartham, the Rev. John Buckner; the other residentiaries, Rev. Combe Miller and Rev. John Courtail voted for Rev. George Metcalf prebendary of Sutton. It was not accepted that Dean Harward had a casting vote so a stalemate ensued. There followed several more meetings to try to resolve the issue but to no avail, so Miller and Courtail petitioned the bishop to settle the matter. The bishop arranged for the four surviving residentiaries to appear before him on 12 January 1785 to explain why they had not made the appointment, and why he should not appoint someone himself. At the hearing the bishop was not persuaded by the arguments so appointed George Metcalf. The dean and Webber refused to accept this decision, but the bishop demanded that they accept his candidate on pain of excommunication. However this was not the end of the matter as the dean and Webber took out an order of the Court of Chancery restraining the bishop from proceeding.

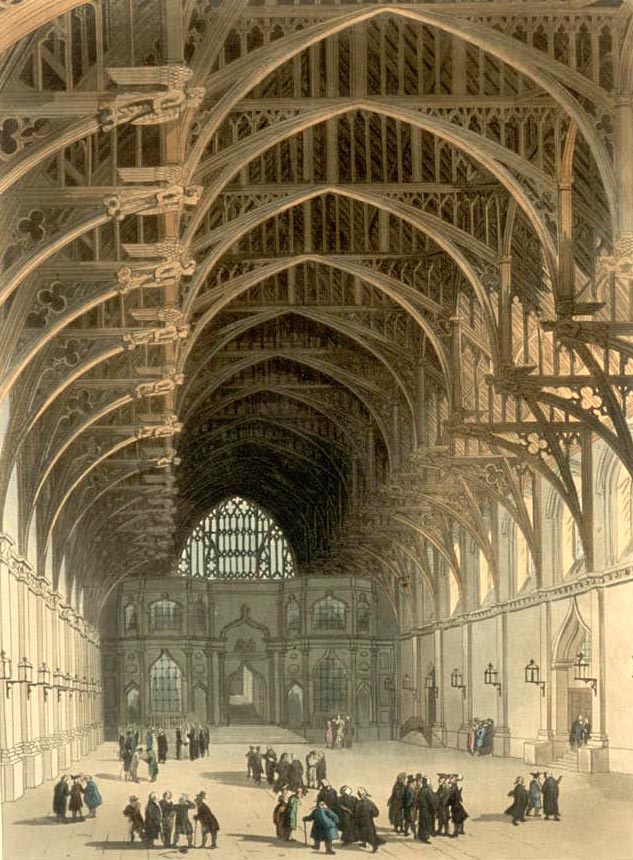
Westminster Hall, where the King's Bench sat until its abolition

The case was eventually heard by the Court of Kings Bench on 27 April 1787. The court agreed with the dean and Webber's argument and found that it was not in the bishop's power to appoint people over the dean and chapter. However it seems that despite all this George Metcalf continued in post.

Summary of the court's findings:

1. A prohibition issued to the bishop of Chichester, who claimed a right to present by lapse, under pretence of his visitational authority, to the office of a canon residentiary of his church, it being a freehold office, and the right of election thereto in the dean and chapter.
2. Whether in case the dean and chapter neglect or refuse to appoint a canon residentiary in proper time, the bishop by virtue of his general visitational power may appoint pro-tempore till such election be had.
3. A mandamus will lie to compel the dean and chapter to fill up a vacancy among the canons residentiary, and on such a mandamus the court will compel an election at the peril of those who refuse.
4. The election is in the dean and canons.
5. The dean has no casting voice.
6. The canons have a right to vote by proxy.
7. There is no lapse to the bishop in the case of a canonry.

Miller's other appointments were:

- 1774 Rector of Winfarthing and Snetterton, Norfolk.
- 1785 Treasurer of Chichester Cathedral.
- 1790 Dean of Chichester cathedral.
- 1806 Warden of the Hospital of St. Mary, Chichester.

He died at Walsham in Suffolk in his 69th year. His wife Ann died in 1826, aged 72.

== Notes ==
Church of England titles
Preceded by Charles Harward	Dean of Chichester; 1790–1814	Succeeded by Christopher Bethell
