= Hugh Turnbull (priest) =

English clergyman and administrator (b. 1517, d. in or before 1566)

Hugh Turnbull (born 1517, died in or before 1566) was an English clergyman and administrator who served as the Dean of Chichester during the 16th century. He was from Lincolnshire, born to an unknown family.

== Education ==
He was admitted to Corpus Christi College, Oxford in 1532, becoming a full fellow by 1538. He earned his BA (1536) and MA (1539). He moved to Europe, matriculating at Louvain (1547) and later received a Doctor of Theology from the University of Padua (1551). Notably, he used a special imperial privilege to get this degree, allowing him to bypass swearing an oath to the Pope. He spent time teaching humanities and civil law in Padua, establishing connections with prominent legal figures like Marco Mantova Benavides.

== Career ==
Turnbull's career was concurrent with the religious volatility of Tudor England. During Mary I reign, he was aligned with the Catholic regime of the time. In 1555, he wrote a letter to Cardinal Reginald Pole congratulating him on reconciling England with the Catholic Church. In March 1558, Pole appointed him a commissioner against heresy to root out Protestants in Canterbury. When the Protestant Elizabeth I took the throne later in 1558, Turnbull managed to keep his high offices despite his Catholic past. The Protestant Archbishop Matthew Parker had him excommunicated for "contumacy" at his visitation on 17 September 1560, but he was absolved on 9 October.

Turnbull was a "pluralist," meaning he held multiple church positions simultaneously and drew an income from them. He was backed by powerful legal patrons including John Tregonwell and Anthony Hussey'. Two of Hussey's sons were tutored by Turnbull, when he was a lecturer of logic in the University of Padua.

=== Parish Rectorships ===
- Rector of Acton, Middlesex (1542–1563)
- Batcombe, Somerset (1547–1564).

=== Canon ===
- Canon of Canterbury Cathedral (1554 until death)
- Canon of Salisbury Cathedral (1562 until death).

=== Dean of Chichester ===
He was appointed Dean of Chichester 27 April 1558 a post he held until his death despite the purges after Elizabeth's accession. His appointment was likely intended to clean up the cathedral's troubled finances, leveraging his prior experience as the treasurer at Canterbury.

== Death ==
He died in November 1566 (his will was proved on 21 November, although his death is recorded at Chichester as 23 November). He left bedding to several of his servants and substantial funds to his sister, brother, and nephews. Reflecting his humanist Oxford roots, he bequeathed a 1535 Venice edition of the works of St. Basil to Corpus Christi College—a book linked to the household of his former patron, Cardinal Pole.

== Sources ==
- CCED (2026). "Clergy of the Church of England database". Kings Digital Lab.
- McCann, Timothy (1981). "The Clergy and the Elizabethan Settlement in the Diocese of Chichester". In Kitch, M.J. (ed.). Studies in Sussex Church History. London: Leopards Head Press. ISBN 0-904920-03-8.
- Mayer, T. F. (2008). "Turnbull, Hugh (b. 1517, d. in or before 1566)". Oxford Dictionary of National Biography (online ed.). Oxford University Press. doi:10.1093/ref:odnb/47433. (Subscription, Wikipedia Library access or UK public library membership required.)
- Rex, Richard (2019). "Corpus Christi College and the Reformation". In Watts, John (ed.). History of Universities. Vol. XXXII / 1-2. Oxford: Oxford University Ptress. ISBN 978-0-19-884852-3.

Church of England titles
Preceded by William Pye	Dean of Chichester; 1558–1566	Succeeded by Richard Curteys
