= Seffrid II =

12th and 13th-century Bishop of Chichester

- Bishop of Chichester
- Appointed: before 16 November 1180
- Term ended: 17 March 1204
- Predecessor: John of Greenford
- Successor: Simon of Wells
- Other post: Dean of Chichester

Orders
- Consecration: 16 November 1180

Personal details
- Died: 17 March 1204

Seffrid II (fl. 1172–1204) was an English cleric who served as a medieval Bishop of Chichester.

== Life ==
Little is known of Seffrid's ancestry, but given the unusual name he shared with Seffrid I, bishop of Chichester from 1125 to 1145, the two were probably related. He probably studied law at Bologna, for there was a Seffrid the Englishman at Bologna at the proper time, and Pope Celestine III called Bishop Seffrid "learned in the law". He was a royal clerk before being named Archdeacon of Chichester by 1173. He also served as a royal justice in 1172 and 1173. By December 1178 he was Dean of Chichester.

Seffrid was consecrated as bishop on 16 November 1180. There is no record of Seffrid serving the royal administration while he was bishop. Nor does he appear in wider public affairs except in formal ceremonial affairs like coronations or councils. Instead he devoted himself to work in his diocese, where he worked to assure that vicars were provided for, that hospitals were well endowed, and that the system of prebends that supported his cathedral clergy was well regulated. He also rebuilt his cathedral after a fire in 1187, and dedicated the new building in 1199. The hall and chapel of the episcopal palace in Chichester were also constructed in his episcopate. Work was also done on the castle of Amberley and the bishop's manor of Bishopstone under his direction.

Seffrid died 17 March 1204. 72 genuine documents survive from his time as archbishop. One of these documents is his profession of obedience to the archbishop of Cantebury, but the rest are a mix of grants, confirmations of grants, clerical statutes, clerical licenses, judgements, and letters.

== Citations ==
Catholic Church titles
Preceded by John of Greenford	Bishop of Chichester; 1180–1204	Succeeded by Simon of Wells
