= George Stradling =

George Stradling (1620 or 1621 – 19 April 1688) was Dean of Chichester Cathedral from 1672 until his death.

== Life ==
Stradling was born at St Donat's Castle, Wales to Sir John Stradling, Baronet and travelled to France and Italy before studying at the University of Oxford. He entered Jesus College, Oxford in 1638 when he was 17 years old and obtained his Bachelor of Arts degree in 1640. He was noted as a talented lutenist. In 1641, he was made a Fellow of All Souls' College, Oxford, where Gilbert Sheldon was Warden, and he later obtained his Master of Arts (1647) and Doctor of Divinity (1661) degrees. He was also a Fellow of Jesus College from 1641 to 1642. He fought on the Royalist side during the English Civil War as a cornet of horse in his brother's regiment. He returned to Oxford when the fighting ended, and survived the threat of ejection by the Parliamentary Visitors in control of the university with the help of Edmund Ludlow, a prominent Parliamentarian and his nephew by marriage.

He was ordained deacon and priest by the Bishop of Oxford, Robert Skinner, on 7 November 1660 and became Sheldon's chaplain in London (Sheldon having become Bishop of London by this time) rather than become Principal of Jesus College. With Sheldon's influence, Stradling was able to obtain many benefices, which he held at the same time (as a pluralist). He occasionally held positions at parishes in Fulham and St Bride's Church, Fleet Street (London), Hanwell (Middlesex), Cliffe-at-Hoo and Sutton-at-Hone (Kent). He was also canon of St Paul's Cathedral and of Westminster Abbey: appointed to both in 1660, he was still holding these posts when he died. In 1671, he became precentor of Chichester Cathedral and was made dean in 1672, again holding both posts until his death. Despite being a pluralist, Stradling presided at meetings of the cathedral chapter at least once in every year and also helped to repair and improve the cathedral after the effects of the Civil War. However, he clashed with the Bishop of Chichester, Guy Carleton, who regarded Stradling as indifferent. Stradling died on 19 April 1688 and was buried at Westminster Abbey. He published one sermon during his lifetime, with others being published after his death.

Church of England titles
Preceded by Lambrocus Thomas	Dean of Chichester; 1672 –1688	Succeeded by Francis Hawkins
