= John Newey (poet) =

Poet

John Newey (c. 1711-20 April 1737) was the eldest son of John Newey and Ann Newey (née Wheeler).

He studied at Merton College, Oxford, matriculating on 27 November 1728 at the age of 18; BA (1732); MA (1736). He became a fellow of Merton College, Oxford.

Newey contributed a poem Ad Isin to a congratulatory volume of verse from the University of Oxford on the marriage of Frederick, Prince of Wales and Princess Augusta of Saxe-Gotha.

Newey died on 20 April 1737, at age 26 and was buried at Itchen Abbas church where he is commemorated in a memorial in the porch together with his brother, Samuel. Given that Newey was 18 on 27 November 1728 and 26 on 20 April 1737, he was born between 28 November 1710 and 19 April 1711.
