= John of Greenford =

12th-century Bishop of Chichester

- Bishop of Chichester
- Elected: April 1173
- Term ended: 26 April 1180
- Predecessor: Hilary of Chichester
- Successor: Seffrid II
- Other post: Dean of Chichester

Orders
- Consecration: 6 October 1174

Personal details
- Died: 26 April 1180

John of Greenford was a medieval Bishop of Chichester.

== Life ==
Some historians say John's ancestry is unknown, but others say he was the son of a canon, or priest. Although Greenford is a location in Middlesex, no contemporary record gives him that name, and it not known when the surname was first attached to John. He was a prebend of London, and Dean of Chichester, holding the office of dean for over 20 years. He was elected to the see of Chichester in late April 1173, and consecrated on 6 October 1174. As he is said to have been the son of a priest, he obtained a papal dispensation in the summer of 1174. He died on 26 April 1180. Besides his profession of obedience to the Archbishop of Canterbury, another 13 documents of John's survive.

== Citations ==
Catholic Church titles
Preceded by Hilary of Chichester	Bishop of Chichester; 1173–1180	Succeeded by Seffrid II
