= James Hargraves =

James Hargraves or Hargrave (1690–1741) was an English Anglican divine who became the Dean of Chichester Cathedral in 1739.

== Early life ==
Hargraves was the son of Nathaniel Hargrave of Wakefield, Yorkshire and went to school in his home town. He matriculated in 1709 and studied at Clare College, Cambridge, where he was awarded his BA in 1711–1712. He received his MA 1715 and his DD (Com. Reg.) in 1728.

== Career ==
James Hargraves was ordained in 1712/13. He became Rector of the parish of East Hoathly in 1718 (the location of the Duke of Newcastle's estate of Halland), Prebendary of [East]Thorney, Sussex in 1723. He was appointed Chaplain to the King in 1724 and Prebendary of Westminster in 1725, was Rector of St Margaret's, Westminster 1730–1734, and was Dean of Chichester from 1739 until his death.

He was elected a Fellow of the Royal Society in 1726.

He died on 4 December 1741 and was buried in Chichester Cathedral.

== Patronage and the church in Sussex ==
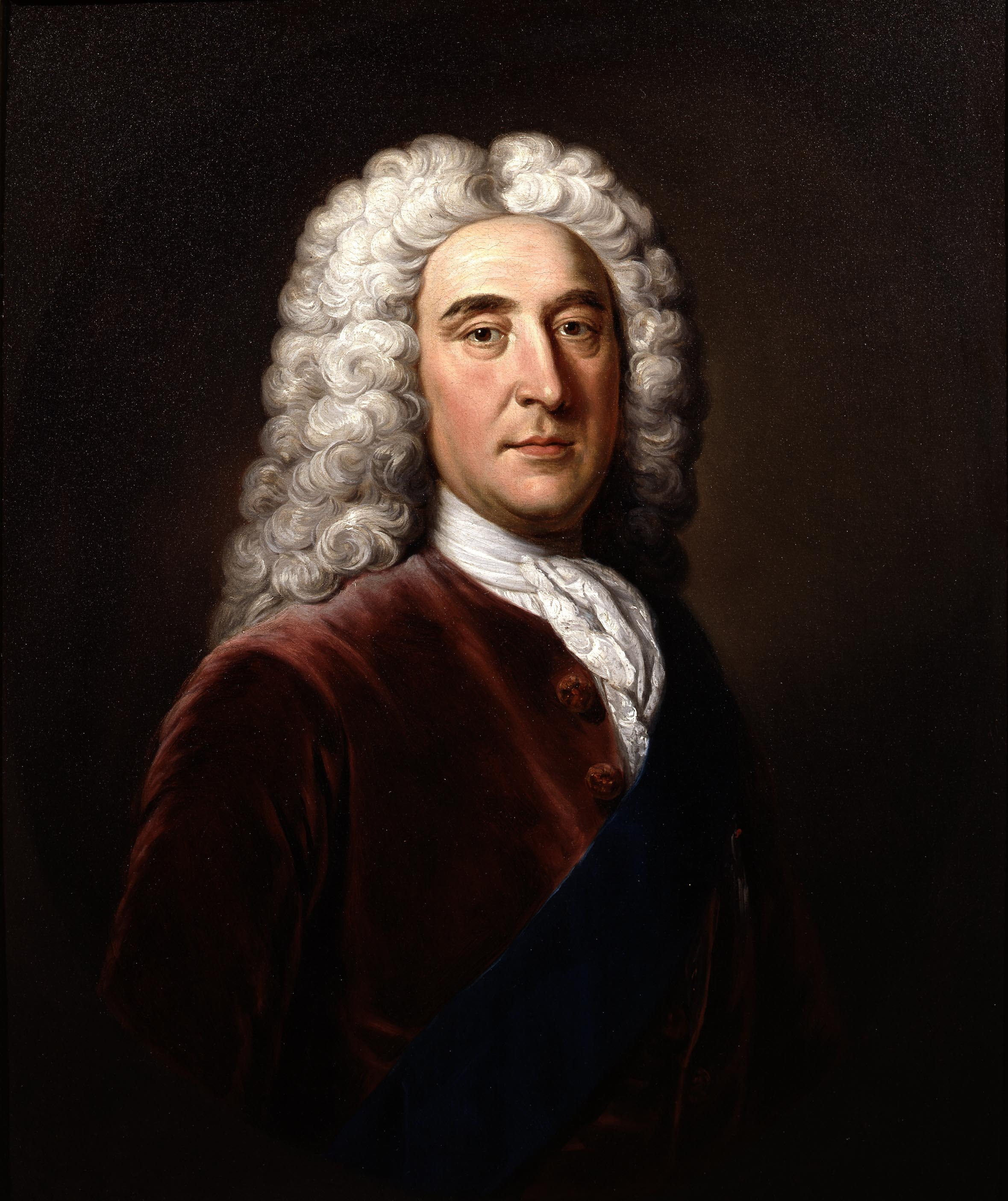
Thomas Pelham-Holles, Duke of Newcastle

The Pelham family had been in Sussex since the thirteenth century. In 1711 one of the family, Thomas Pelham, inherited the title and vast estate of John Holles, the Duke of Newcastle who had been his mother's brother. The heir's only obligation was to append 'Holles' to his name and so he became Thomas Pelham-Holles. In 1712 he also inherited the Pelham estates in Sussex, from his father. The new Duke of Newcastle, Thomas Pelham-Holles was a very wealthy man with major landholdings throughout England and the power to influence the selection of at least a dozen members of parliament. He became a strong supporter of the Whig party. The 19th-century historian Mark Anthony Lower said that his great wealth and influence secured him the utmost deference amongst his Sussex neighbours. In Sussex the Pelham family had influence and contacts among the clergy.

Hargraves first met Thomas Pelham-Holles at Clare College, Cambridge, where he was the future duke's tutor. Hargraves originally came from Wakefield, in Yorkshire, but was brought to Sussex by the duke to be his chaplain. Several Sussex clergymen were to receive preferment due to Newcastle's contacts and influence through the Pelham family. The duke had hoped that the previous dean of Chichester, Thomas Hayley, could be induced to decline his nomination (as dean), so that James Hargraves could be nominated for the post instead. The king had even ordered a warrant to be ready for the royal signature, as soon as he heard of Hayley's refusal. Hayley, however, decided to accept the deanery. Even so, with Newcastles help, Hargraves was able to progress rapidly from his post as chaplain to Dean of Chichester. He became dean of Chichester after Hayley's death in 1739

Hargraves continued to tutor various Pelhams down the years as well as spending much of his time and effort campaigning for Whig candidates in parliamentary elections. This close linking of the political and ecclesiastical life of Sussex continued for most of the middle of the 18th century.

Both Newcastle and Hargraves seemed to have remained friends until Hargraves death in 1741.

== Notes ==
Church of England titles
Preceded by Thomas Hayley	Dean of Chichester; 1739–1741	Succeeded by William Ashburnham
