= Robert Holtby =

Anglican priest and author (1921–2003)

Robert Tinsley Holtby FSA was an Anglican priest and author in the second half of the 20th century.

Born in Thornton-le-Dale on 25 February 1921 and educated at Scarborough College and St Edmund Hall, Oxford, he was ordained after a period of study at Ripon College Cuddesdon in 1947. In that year he married Mary, the elder daughter of Eric Graham, the Bishop of Brechin: they had three children. He was Curate of Pocklington until 1948 when he became a Chaplain to the Forces. Following this he was Chaplain and an Assistant Master at Malvern College then St Edward's School, Oxford. From 1959 to 1967 he was a Canon Residentiary at Carlisle Cathedral and a Director of Education, Diocese of Carlisle. For the next decade he was General Secretary of the National Society for Promoting Religious Education. During the same period, he was a member of the Schools Committee, Church of England Board of Education, serving as Secretary (1967–74) and then General Secretary (1974–77). He was Dean of Chichester from 1977 until his retirement in 1989. He died on 13 March 2003.

Church of England titles
Preceded by John Walter Atherton Hussey	Dean of Chichester; 1977 – 1989	Succeeded by John David Treadgold
