= St Cuthbert's Church, Darlington =

St Cuthbert’s Church, Darlington
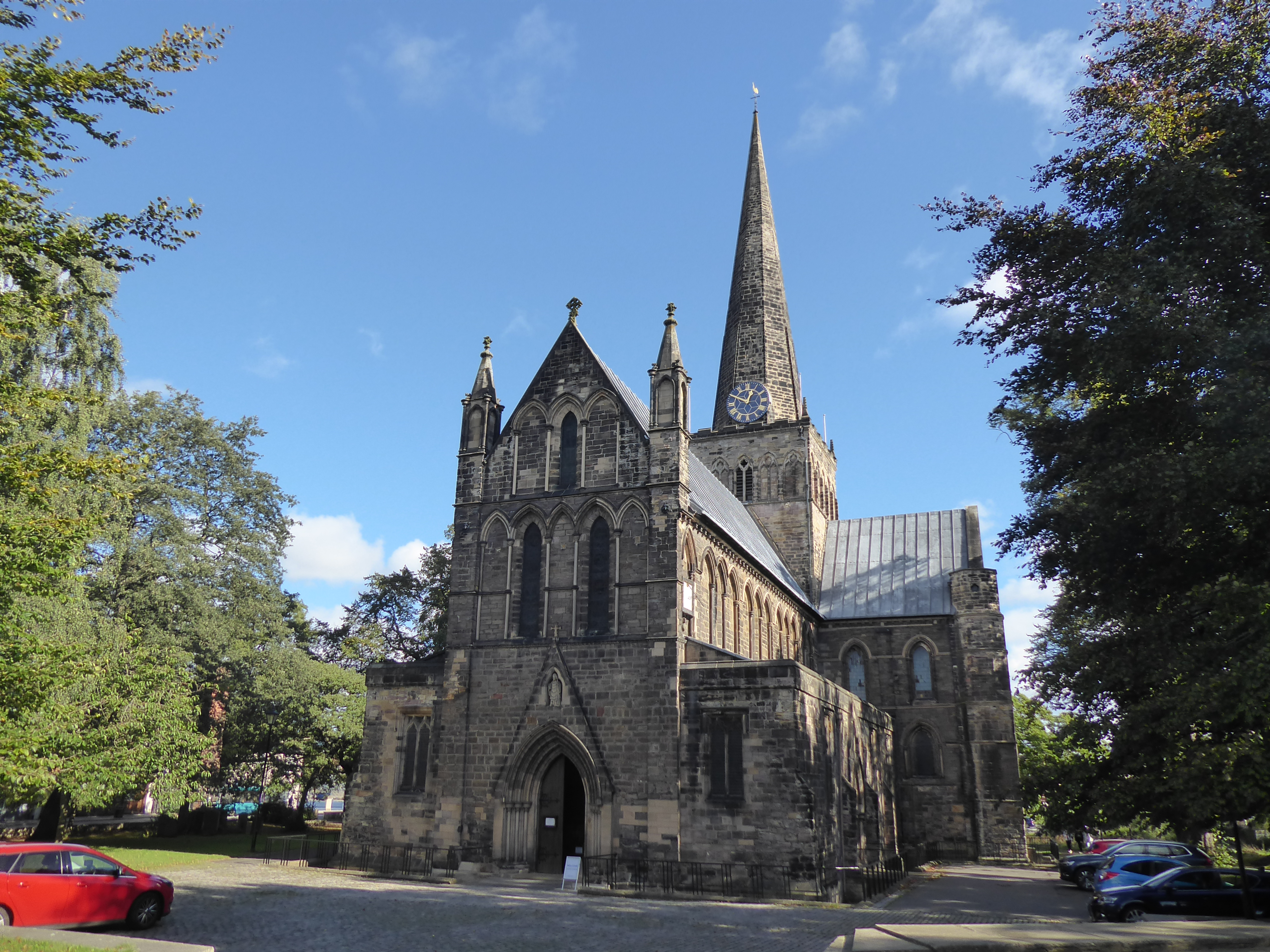
- St Cuthbert's Church, Darlington

- Location within County Durham
- 54°31′27″N 1°33′4.8″W
- OS grid reference: NZ 29106 14442
- Location: Darlington
- Country: England
- Denomination: Church of England

History
- Dedication: Cuthbert of Lindisfarne

Architecture
- Heritage designation: Grade I listed

Specifications
- Length: 130 feet (40 m)
- Width: 75 feet (23 m)

Administration
- Diocese: Durham
- Archdeaconry: Auckland
- Deanery: Darlington
- Parish: Darlington St Cuthbert

St Cuthbert's Church, Darlington is a parish church in the Church of England Diocese of Durham in Darlington, County Durham.

== History ==
The church dates from the early 12th century. The church became collegiate when Richard Whitton was appointed by the Bishop of Durham Rt Revd Robert Neville as the first Dean of Darlington in 1439. To support the dean, there were four prebendaries, Cockerton, Newton, Blakwell and Darlington. The college survived until 1550 when it was dissolved.

Following a lightning strike on the spire on 17 July 1750, the crossing tower was rebuilt in 1752.

A major restoration took place in 1864-65 by the architects George Gilbert Scott of London and James Pigott Pritchett of Darlington. The estimated costs of the works were £1,590 (equivalent to £172,700 in 2025) and William Vane, 3rd Duke of Cleveland gave £500 (equivalent to £54,300 in 2025) towards the restoration. The work involved removal of the galleries and ceilings, the opening out of the gable windows in the nave and transepts, the rearranging of the pews, and the replacing of several stalls which had been destroyed. The main work was the restoration of the chancel where the piscina and armoury were restored, the sedilia restored to their original depth, the floor laid with encaustic tiles and eleven stained glass windows inserted. A font was presented by R.H. Allan, of grey polished marble. A lectern by Messrs King and Collie of Durham was presented by Miss Topham. The organ was restored and the bells in the tower were recast. The church was reopened for worship on 14 December 1865.

In March 2026, the remains of an earlier place of worship, thought to be Anglo-Saxon and dating from circa 1080, was discovered beneath the floor of St Cuthbert's during restoration work; the remains are to be catalogued and preserved.

== Incumbents ==
=== Vicars 1309 - 1436 ===
- Robert de Royeston 1309
- Richard de Hadyngton 1344
- William de Welton 1354
- Robert de Hunmandby 1361
- William Hoton 1398
- William Hesel 1411
- Stephen Austell 1416
- Richard Wytton 1428
- Richard Bicheburn 1436
- Richard Witton

=== Deans 1439 - 1550 ===
- Richard Witton 1439
- Roland Hardgyll 1451
- Robert Symson 1466
- Ralph Lepton 1497
- Cuthbert Marshall ca. 1548

=== Vicars 1550 onwards ===
- Sir John Claxton 1561
- James Thornton, 1571
- John Welshe 1571
- John Woodfall 1584
- Robert Gesford 1601
- Robert Tomlinson 1602
- Isaac Lowden 1606
- Bryan Grant 1612
- Robert Hope 1622
- Thomas Clapperton 1640
- William Parish
- George Bell 1661
- George Thompson 1693
- John Hall 1712
- Cornelius Harrison 1727
- Andrew Wood 1748
- Henry Hemington 1772
- William Gordon 1784
- John William Drage Merest 1831 - 1846
- A.J. Howell 1846 - 1860
- John Garencieres Pearson 1860 - 1873
- Canon Hodgson 1873 - 1894
- Francis Warren Mortimer 1894 - 1905
- David Walker 1906 - 1919
- Robert Ferry Drury 1919 - 1935
- William C. Jordan 1935 - 1943
- David Brownfield Porter 1943 - 1947 (afterwards Rector of St John's Church, Princes Street, Edinburgh)
- George Holderness 1947 - 1954 (afterwards Bishop of Burnley)
- Peter Wansey 1955 - 1974
- John David Treadgold 1974 - 1981 (afterwards Canon of Windsor)
- Canon Leslie Gready ???? - 1993 (afterwards Dean of Bulawayo, Matabeleland, Zimbabwe)
- Geoff Miller 1996 - 1999 (afterwards Dean of Newcastle)
- Robert John Williamson 2000 - 2016
- Matthew Paul Firth 2018 - 2020
- James Harvey 2021 -

== Organ ==
The organ dates from 1880 when it was built by Forster and Andrews. Later work by Binns Fitton & Haley and Bishop & Son in 1987 has resulted in a 38 stop 3 manual and pedal organ. The specification can be found on the National Pipe Organ Register. The new organ cost about £1,000 (equivalent to £104,000 in 2025) and was opened on 3 November 1880 by William Thomas Best.

=== Organists ===
- George J. Crossley ca. 1830s - 1850
- Frederick Second 1850 - 1858
- J.W. Marshall 1858 - 1896 (formerly organist of Richmond Parish Church)
- Dr. Thomas Hutchinson 1896 - 1917
- Arthur Kitson 1917 - 1941 (formerly deputy organist at Halifax Parish Church)
- Edgar Miller 1941 - ???? (formerly organist of Tonbridge, Kent)
- Hector C. Parr
- Paul Busby 2005 - 2012
- David Ratnanayagam

== Bells ==
The tower contains a peal of 8 bells by Gillett & Johnston dating from 1937.
