= John Kennall =

John Kennall (aka John Kenold) (1511–1592) was Archdeacon of Oxford and a noted pluralist.

Kennall was educated at Christ Church, Oxford.

He was Canon of 8th preb., Christ Church, Oxford, from 1559 to 1592, Archdeacon of Oxford, Oxford, from 1561 to 1592, Canon of 6th preb., Rochester, from 1556 to 1559, and Archdeacon of Rochester, 1554–1560. He was for a time Vicar at St Columb Major in Cornwall and had a strong interest in the use of the Cornish language. Carew, who published his survey of Cornwall in 1602, notices the almost total extirpation of the Cornish language in his days. He says: The principal love and knowledge of this language liveth in Dr. Kennall, the civilian, and with him lieth buried, for the English speech doth encroach upon it and have driven the same to the utmost skirts of the shire.

The link between the Cornish language and Catholicism was also exhibited in the activities of Kennall, at St Columb, where he was still holding Mass as late as 1590.

== See also ==
- Elizabethan Religious Settlement
- Act of Supremacy 1559

Academic offices
Preceded by Thomas Whyte	Vice-Chancellor of Oxford University; 1564–1567	Succeeded by Thomas Cowper
