= Francis Hawkins (priest) =

Anglican priest

Francis Hawkins (c.1643- 19 February 1699) was an Anglican priest at the time of the Glorious Revolution.

== Education ==
At 16 years old, Hawkins joined Peterhouse, Cambridge as a sizar for the period between 1659 and 1660. He studied at Fotheringhay Grammar School where he matriculated in 1661. Then he continued his education at Peterhouse with a B.A. 1663-4; Scholar, 1664; M.A. 1667 and D.D. in 1679.

== Family ==
Hawkins had a wife and eight children, including Francis (1689), William (1686) and George (I704).

== Appointments ==
- Vicar : St Mary's Willesden, Middlesex, (1670–99)
- Chaplain : St Peter's Chapel, Tower of London (1673-1689)
- Rector : Gedney (sinecure rectory) (1678 - 1699 )
- Preacher : Throughout the diocese of Lincoln (1678)
- Preacher : Gedney (sinecure rectory) (1678 )
- Dean : Chichester cathedral, Dean of Chichester (1688 -1699 )
- Prebendary : St Paul's Cathedral, Wenlocksbarn Prebend (1699) (Note: Many of the vicars of Willesden were also canons of St. Paul's, prebendaries, and pluralists. Francis Hawkins was one and was followed by a William Hawkins, vicar 1699-1736 who was possibly his son.)
- Perpetual Vicar : Willesden (1699 )

== Legal proceedings and James II ==
In February 1681 a certain Edward Fitzharris, wrote a libelous letter against the king James II of England, for this he was sent to the Tower of London. The Commons subsequently impeached Fitzharris, with the intent of getting the matter presented in court. The chaplain of the Tower, Hawkins, operating in the interests of the court, offered Fitzharris a pardon if he would accuse a member of the House of Commons, Lord Howard of Escrick, of writing the libel against the king. However the Hawkins offer of a pardon was concocted and Fitzharris was executed 1 July 1681. The false confession was published the following day. (Note: While Fitzharris was in prison he was persuaded to turn informer by Henry Cornish and Slingsby Bethel, the sheriffs of the city of London. The Fitzharris confession to Hawkins, was published in a pamphlet known as 'Truth vindicated'.) For his involvement in this matter Hawkins was rewarded with the Deanery of Chichester.

In April 1688, the catholic James II of England re-issued his Declaration of Indulgence (Note: The Declaration granted broad religious freedom in England by suspending penal laws enforcing conformity to the Church of England and allowing people to worship in their homes or chapels as they saw fit, and it ended the requirement of affirming religious oaths before gaining employment in government office.) and ordered the Anglican clergy to read it in their churches. James appointed an Ecclesiastical Commission to find out the names of the clergy who had refused to read out the declaration. One who did not was Hawkins, who previously had been appointed by James as chaplain to the Chapel of St. Peter within the Tower of London. A post he held for sixteen years. In 1689 James ejected Hawkins from his post for failure to read the declaration, though Hawkins refused to be turned out of his house.

== Sources ==
- Bolton, Diane K; Croot, Patricia E C; Hicks, M A (1982). "Willesden: Churches". In Baker, T F T; Elrington, C R (eds.). A History of the County of Middlesex. British History Online. Vol. 7. London: Victoria County History. pp. 236–241.
- CCEd (2013). "Francis Hawkins". King's College London.
- Earl of Dartmouth (1896). The Manuscripts of the Earl of Dartmouth. Vol. III. London: HMSO. OCLC 769191759.
- Gibson, W (2009). "The Reaction" James II and the Trial of the Seven Bishops. London: Palgrave Macmillan. ISBN 978-1-349-30163-8.
- Goodwin, Gordon (1889). Edward Fitzharris. Dictionary of National Biography. 1885-1900 . Vol. 19. London: Smith, Elder & Co.Ltd. – via Wikisource.
- Harris, Tim (2007). Revolution: The Great Crisis of the British Monarch, 1685–1720. London: Penguin. ISBN 978-1-410-16523-7.
- Hawkins, Francis (1681), TRUTH VINDICATED: OR A detection of the Aspersions and Scandals cast upon Sir ROBERT CLAYTON and Sir GEORGE TREBY, Justices; and SLINGSBY BETHELL and HENRT CORNISH Esquires, Sheriffs, of the City of LONDON, in a Paper published in the Name of Dr. Francis Haw∣kins Minister of the Tower, INTITULED, THE CONFESSION OF EDWARD FITZ-HARRIS Esq; &c. The Coppy of which Paper is herewith Printed, for the Readers clearer judgment in the Case, London: Rich. Baldwin
- Venn, J.A. (1922). Alumni cantabrigienses; a biographical list of all known students, graduates and holders of office at the University of Cambridge, from the earliest times to 1900. Vol. II. Cambridge University Press. OCLC 14776494.

Church of England titles
Preceded by George Stradling	Dean of Chichester; 1688 – 1699	Succeeded by William Hayley
