= Lambrocus Thomas =

Lambrocus Thomas (1610? - 1672) (Note: Also Lambrock Thomas (National Portrait Gallery). Lambrocus Thomas (Dallaway} Thomas Lambrook (Hennessy) Lambrochus Thomas (Hennessy) Lambrock Thomas (Hennessy). Le Neve lists him as Thomas Lambrook.) was a Welsh clergyman who served as Canon Chancellor and Dean of Chichester Cathedral.

== Education ==
Thomas studied at the University of Franeker where he matriculated on 2 June 1641 and graduated, in divinity, on 4 October 1643. He was incorporated, on his doctors degree, at Cambridge University, in 1670.

== Family ==
Lambrocus Thomas was married to Margaret Thomas alias Briggs. His wife outlived him and she was the executrix of his will.

== Career ==
- Vicar of Pevensey, Sussex 1642-1672
- Chancellor of Chichester 1660-1672
- Dean of Chichester 1671 (Note: Some sources quote 1671 as his start year, for Dean of Chichester, others 1672.)-1672

=== Chichester ===
At the end of the 17th century the full number of Canons Residentiary, at Chichester Cathedral, was four. In 1661 when one of the Canons Residentiary (Nicholas Garbrand) resigned, he was not replaced. In 1663 Thomas, who by that time was chancellor, made the number of residentiaries back up to four. When he eventually became Dean in 1671, he continued to hold the residentiary post. He was the last person, at Chichester, to hold the post of Canon Residentiary and Dean simultaneously.

== Monument ==
Lambrocus Thomas died 27 November 1672. Thomas Abingdon writing in 1717 recorded that a memorial plaque in black marble had been attached to the north wall at the upper end of the Chichester Cathedral chancel. The original text was in Latin, an English translation follows:

Here rests the Reverend Lambrocus Thomas Cambro-British (Note: Cambro-British - a Welsh person.) Theology Professor of the College of Saint John at Cambridge.
Most worthy Dean of this Church, who with piety and devotion to God.
The loving affection of his beloved wife.
Finally, the innocence and uprightness of his manners should be shown to all who loved him.
From this life he departed for the better in the year of our Lord 1672.

— Abingdon 1717, p. 235

== Sources ==
- Abingdon, Thomas (1717). The antiquities of the cathedral church of Worcester. London: E. Curll.
- Cross, Thomas (1660). "Engraving of Lambrock (Lambrocus) Thomas". London: National Portrait Gallery.
- Dallaway, James (1815). A History of the Western Division of the County of Sussex. Vol. 1. London: T. Bensley.
- Hennessy, George (1900). Chichester Diocese Clergy Lists: Clergy Succession from the earliest time to the year 1900. London: St Peters Press.
- Holtby, Robert T (1994). "The Restoration to 1790". In Hobbs, Mary (ed.). Chichester Cathedral: An Historic Survey. Chichester: Phillimore. ISBN 0-85033-924-3.
- Lambeth Palace Library (2022). "Database of Manuscripts and Archives". Church of England Record Centre.
- Le Neve, John (1854). Fasti ecclesiae Anglicanae . Vol. 1. Oxford: OUP – via Wikisource.
- Prögler, Daniela (2016). English Students at Leiden University, 1575-1640. London: Taylor & Francis. ISBN 978-1-409-43712-3.
- Venn, J.A. (1922). Alumni cantabrigienses; a biographical list of all known students, graduates and holders of office at the University of Cambridge, from the earliest times to 1900. Vol. II. Cambridge University Press.

Church of England titles
Preceded by Nathaniel Crew, 3rd Baron Crew	Dean of Chichester; 1671 –1672	Succeeded by George Stradling
