= John Newey =

English clergyman (1664–1735)

John Newey (4 December 1664 – 13 September 1735) was an English churchman, Dean of Chichester from 1727 to 1735.

== Life ==
Born in Kinver, Staffordshire, he was the elder son of Jonathan Newey, Rector of Kinver. Newey was educated at Kinver and at Pembroke College, Oxford (BA: 1686; MA: 1689); DD, 1729.

He married on 29 May 1707 Ann Wheeler, daughter of John Wheeler and Dorothy, Wheeler's first wife. They had two sons and four daughters: Mary (9 September 1708 – 3 January 1767) married Dr Benjamin Hoadly (Bishop of Winchester); John (c. 1711-20 April 1737), fellow of Merton College, Oxford; Ann; Jane; Katherine (c. 1720-12 December 1770); Samuel (c. 1722-2 October 1739), educated at Eton College and King's College, Cambridge.

Newey died on 13 September 1735, at age 70 and is buried at Itchen Abbas church where he is commemorated in a memorial within the church.

== Career ==
Ordained: deacon by John Hough, Bishop of Oxford, 25 June 1690; priest by Thomas Sprat, Bishop of Rochester, 22 May 1692.

Curate at Beckenham from 22 May 1692. Vicar at Wombourne (8 June 1693 – 10 March 1696). He resigned from this position on grounds of ill health and moved to London becoming Professor of Music at Gresham College (9 October 1696 – 1 December 1705) and being elected as a Fellow of the Royal Society (30 November 1696). He resumed church duties becoming Rector and then Prebendary of Itchen Abbas (25 April 1707 – 13 September 1735) shortly before his marriage; Rector: Avington (9 April 1722 – 31 August 1726); Dean of Chichester (21 June 1728 – 13 September 1735).

Newey's books were offered for sale after his death.

Church of England titles
| Preceded by Thomas Sherlock | Dean of Chichester; 1727–1735 | Succeeded by Thomas Hayley |
