= Institute for Food, Brain and Behaviour =

The Institute for Food, Brain and Behaviour ("IFBB") is a British registered charity with the primary focus of commissioning research into how food, nutrition and diet can affect brain function and behaviour.

Trustees include France Jackson (Chairman) and John Stein. Former trustees include Hugh Montefiore, Henry Kitchener, 3rd Earl Kitchener, Baroness Greenfield, Nicholas Frayling and Lord Ramsbotham.

The Science Fellows are Kathleen Taylor (biologist), Dr Jonathan Tamman and Dr Rachel Gow.

The Patron is Prue Leith.

== History ==
In 1984, a charity known as South Cumbria Alternative Sentencing Options was founded to investigate whether nutrition could play a role in minimising recidivism in young offenders. The organisation became Natural Justice in 1991, and finally the Institute for Food, Brain and Behaviour in 2010. In 2019, the Charity adopted the working name of "Think Through Nutrition".

== Research ==
The institute has a collaborative research programme with Oxford University. It facilitated a £1.4 million research project in three prisons funded by the Wellcome Trust. The study commenced in January 2008 with Professor John Stein (physiologist) of Oxford University as Principal Investigator. It was carried out at three Young Offenders Institutions - HM Prison Hindley, Greater Manchester; Lancaster Farms, Lancashire; and HM Prison Polmont, Falkirk.

The institute has been carrying out a study at Robert Clack School into whether nutritional supplements can improve disadvantaged pupils' cognitive skills and behaviour. This is funded by the Esmée Fairbairn Foundation under their 'food' strand.
