= William Fleshmonger =

16th-century English Anglican priest

William Fleshmonger (Note: Fasti Ecclesiae Anglicanae 1300-1541 says Fleshmonger or Foster Other sources suggest Fleschmonger.)(? -1541/42), the son of a Winchester College tenant, was born in Hambledon, Hampshire. He was a Doctor of Canon Law and Dean of Chichester during the turmoil of the English Reformation.

== Education ==
Fleshmonger attended Winchester College and joined the chapel choir. In 1490, the college chapel had a staff of three chaplains and three lay clerks. The choristers assisted the priests by reading, serving and singing in chapel. Of 15 choristers, that year, nine became scholars including Fleshmonger.

Winchester was a school where 70 scholars and a varying number of commoners were taught grammar and educationally prepared for further studies at New College, Oxford. After completing his education at Winchester Fleshmonger continued his studies at New College where he was a fellow between 1496 and 1514. He read Canon Law at Oxford becoming a Doctor of Canon Law(D.C.L) in 1515 and Doctor of Divinity (D.D.) in 1525.

== Career ==
Fleshmonger was a pluralist, holding several benefices at the same time. The positions he held were:

- Rector of Stedham 1514 — 1517/8
- Vicar of Pevensey 1517/8 — 1519/20
- Vicar of Bexhill 1519/20 — 1524
- Rector of Hartfield 1520 — ?
- Rector of Selsey 1524 — 1541/2
- Rector of Tangmere 1530 — 1530/1
- Rector of Storrington 1530/1— 1542
- Prebendary of Hova Ecclesia 1513 — 1515
- Prebendary of Ipthorne 1515 — 1516
- Prebendary of Woodhorn 1510 — 1518
- Dean of Chichester 1518 — 1541

— Ray 1910, pp. 61–108

=== Other posts ===
He held the Prebendaries of Torleton, in Sarum Diocese (1518-1541) and Carlton cum Dalby in the Lincoln Diocese (1519-1541) also Vicar of St Leonard, Shoreditch(1525-1541) and Custos of St Mary's Hospital Chichester(1520-1541).

== The Prebend of Selsey ==
There had been disputes over the income from the prebend of Selsey(mainly tithes) between the prebendaries of Selsey and the rectors of Selsey for some time. During Fleshmonger's incumbency at Selsey, the prebend of Selsey was held by William Norbury the Archdeacon of Chichester. The bishop of Chichester, Robert Sherborne settled the matter by a deed of composition issued on the 27 March 1526 that ordained that in future the rector should have all the rights, tithes and other emoluments, formerly held by the Prebend. In return the rector should pay £10 half yearly, to the prebend in perpetuity.

== Dean of Chichester ==
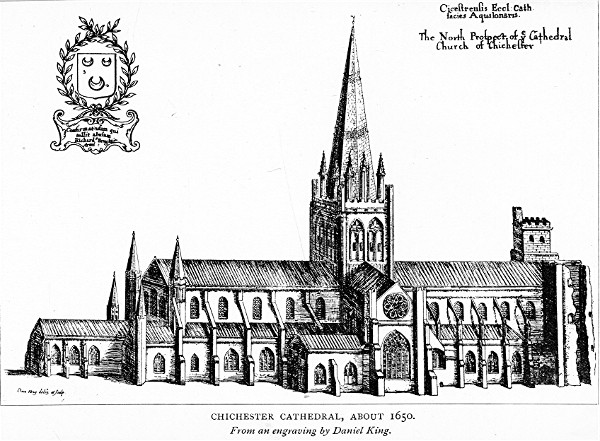
Chichester Cathedral, circa 1650

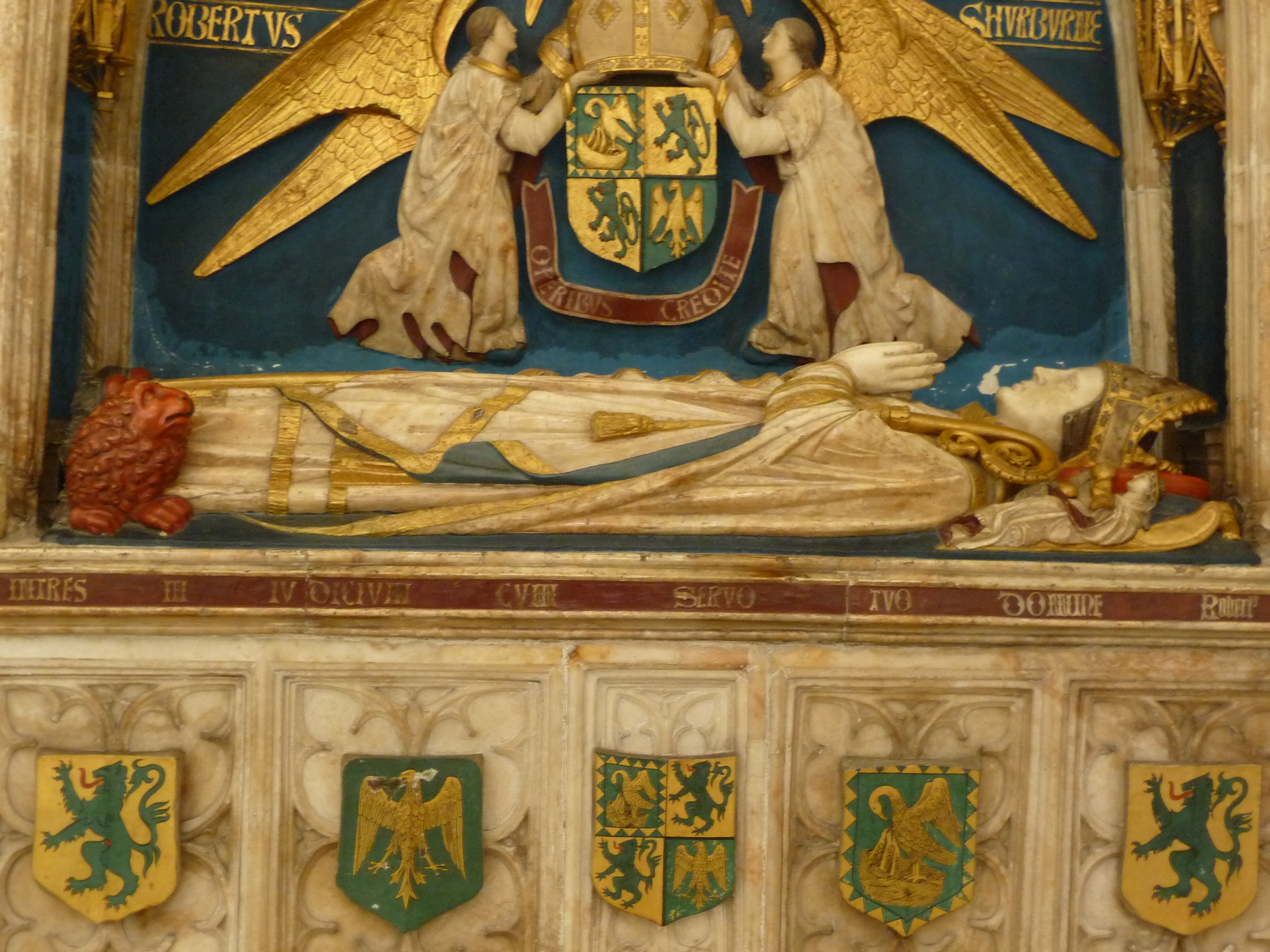
Tomb of Robert Sherborne

During the later Middle Ages, in the Chichester Diocese, the bishop's authority had become limited by the multiplicity and complexity of jurisdictions. In the city of Chichester, the archbishop, bishop and dean exercised both ecclesiastical and temporal jurisdiction. Within the diocese there were many peculiar jurisdictions that limited the authority of the bishop. When Robert Sherborne was appointed Bishop of Chichester, he resolved to reorganise his diocese. One of the officers he appointed to help him achieve his aims was that of William Fleshmonger, who like Sherborne, was a Wykehamist. Fleshmonger was Sherborne's chancellor (Note: The diocesan chancellor is the chief representative of the bishop in the administration of the diocese. From medieval times the chancellor had come to stand in for the bishop in the conduct of cases in the ecclesiastical courts which fell within the bishop's jurisdiction. The definition of a chancellor according to Halsbury's Laws of England. Paragraph 1036. 'As judge of the consistory court the chancellor acts in the capacity of the official principal of the bishop, who appoints him to the office by letters patent. Although the power of nomination and appointment resides in the bishop, the chancellor's authority is derived from the law. He is a Queen's judge, in one of the Queen's courts. He acts in the court … as an independent judge, uncontrolled by the bishop.')and official principal (Note: The officer who exercises jurisdiction in a consistory court is known as the chancellor, and he is appointed by patent from the bishop or archbishop. All jurisdiction, both contentious and voluntary, is committed to him under two separate offices, those of official principal and vicar-general; the distinction between the two offices is that the official principal usually exercises contentious jurisdiction and the vicar-general voluntary jurisdiction.) until the mid-1520s. In 1529, the English Reformation Parliament proposed that canonical courts should be prohibited from trying all ex officio actions, other than heresy cases.

As dean of Chichester Fleshmonger presided over an ecclesiastical court that tried a certain John Hoggesflesh who had been accused of heresy in 1534. After a protracted trial, the court referred the case to Archbishop Cranmer who in turn referred it to the Duke of Norfolk, who in his turn referred it to Henry VIII. (Note: At the time of the trial the break from the Roman Catholic church had only just happened, so there was no safe consensus view, for the judges to hold about John Hoggesflesh's arguments.) The king confirmed that Hoggesflesh opinions were erroneous. Norfolk wrote to Sherborne on the 6 November to advise him of the kings decision:

My very good lorde. This shalbe to advertise you that I have
shewid the kyngs highnes of the detestable opinions of Hoxfleshe of
Lewes now in your kepyng, And his pleasur is that ye shulde procede
agenst hym as oon that doth holde the opynion that is heresy. My
lorde of canterbury doth in like wise afferme his opinions to be
heresy. Good my lorde consideryng the goodnes of our maister to
be so gracious let no slaclrnes be founde in you. And thus fare ye well
from Westmynyster the sixth day of November.
Yours
T. Norffolk

— Welch 1957, pp. 59–70

So Hoggesflesh was forced to recant his ‘detestable opinions’ and do public penance in the cathedral and read out a declaration of his errors in the market places of Chichester, Midhurst, and Lewes.

=== The Almhouses ===
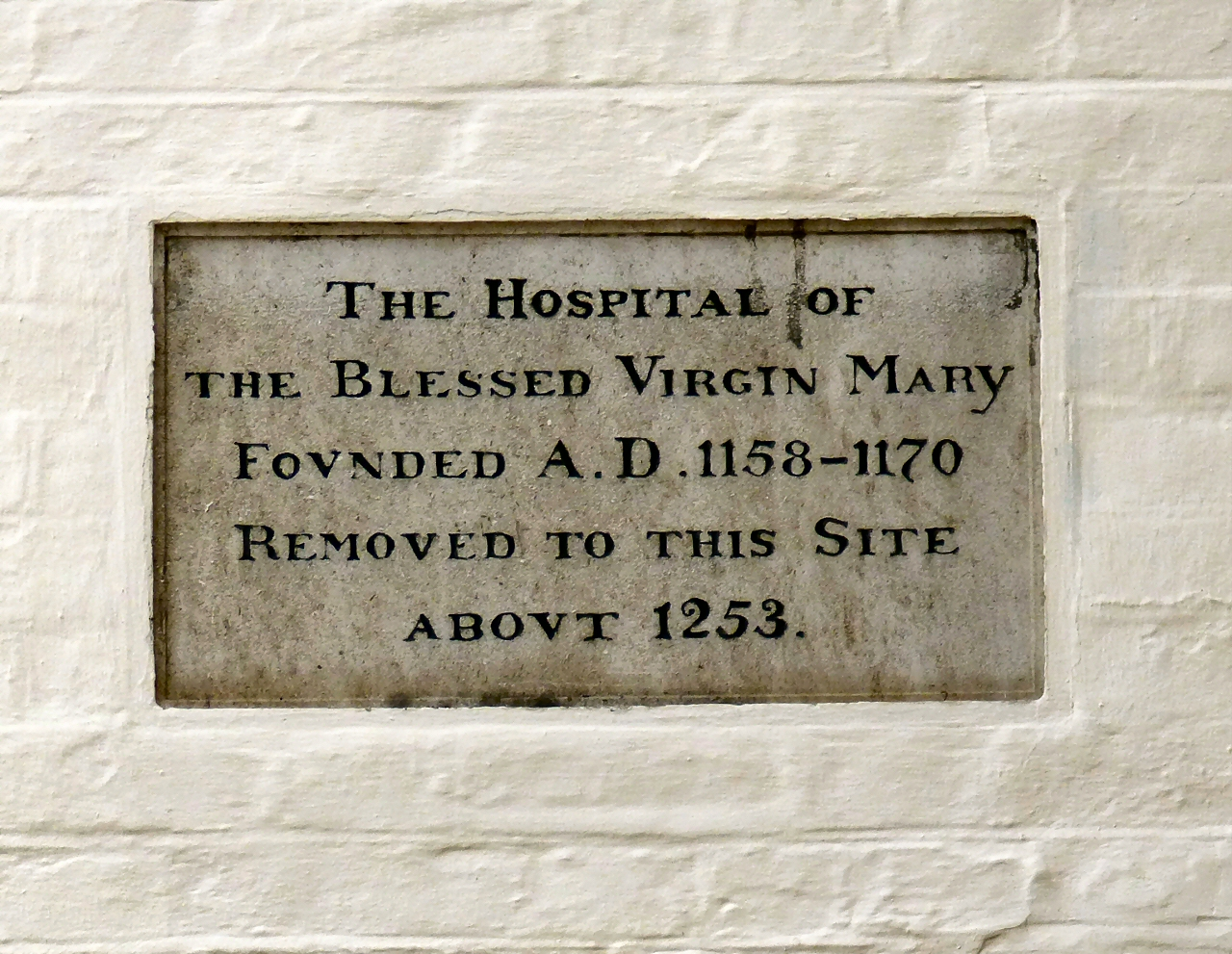
Plaque on St Mary's Hospital Almshouses, Chichester

In the 12th century the Hospital of the Blessed Virgin Mary was founded in Chichester. A community of brothers and sisters cared for the sick and the poor who needed a bed for the night. The hospital was moved from its original location in 1253 to its current location in St Martin's square, Chichester.

Under William Fleshmongers tenure St Mary's hospital was reorganised in 1528. The warden of the hospital was to be a priest. The priest was to visit the hospital once a month to ensure that mass was celebrated. Accounts were to be produced once a year for the dean and chapter. After the reorganisation it lost its hospital status. (Note: In 1582 its hospital status was re-established under an Elizabethan statute) It became an almshouse with accommodation for five poor brethren and sisters ‘worn down with age and infirmity’. Fleshmonger is credited with being the almshouse founder and first custos.

=== Chichester Cathedral choir ===
In 1536 it cost the cathedral £17 6s 8d (Note: £ - pound, s - shilling, d- penny.) (Note: In 2017 the equivalent buying power of £17 6s 8d was approximately £7,303.52. In 1540, you could buy one of the following with £17 6s 8d: * 3 Horses or 13 Cows. * It would be the equivalent of 577 days wages for a skilled tradesman.) to accommodate and clothe the members of the choir, Fleshmonger provided 40s (£2 modern equivalent) a year subsidy to the choir to supply 'shurtes, hoses and shoys' .

=== Legacy ===
In 1548-49 (after Fleshmonger's death), the king under the abolition of chantries act claimed Fleshmonger's annuity. However, an amicable arrangement was arrived at whereby the city of Chichester and its cathedral benefited rather than the crown.
