= Edward Waddington =

English prelate

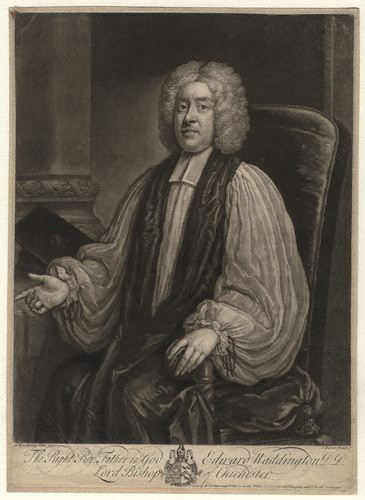
Bishop Waddington

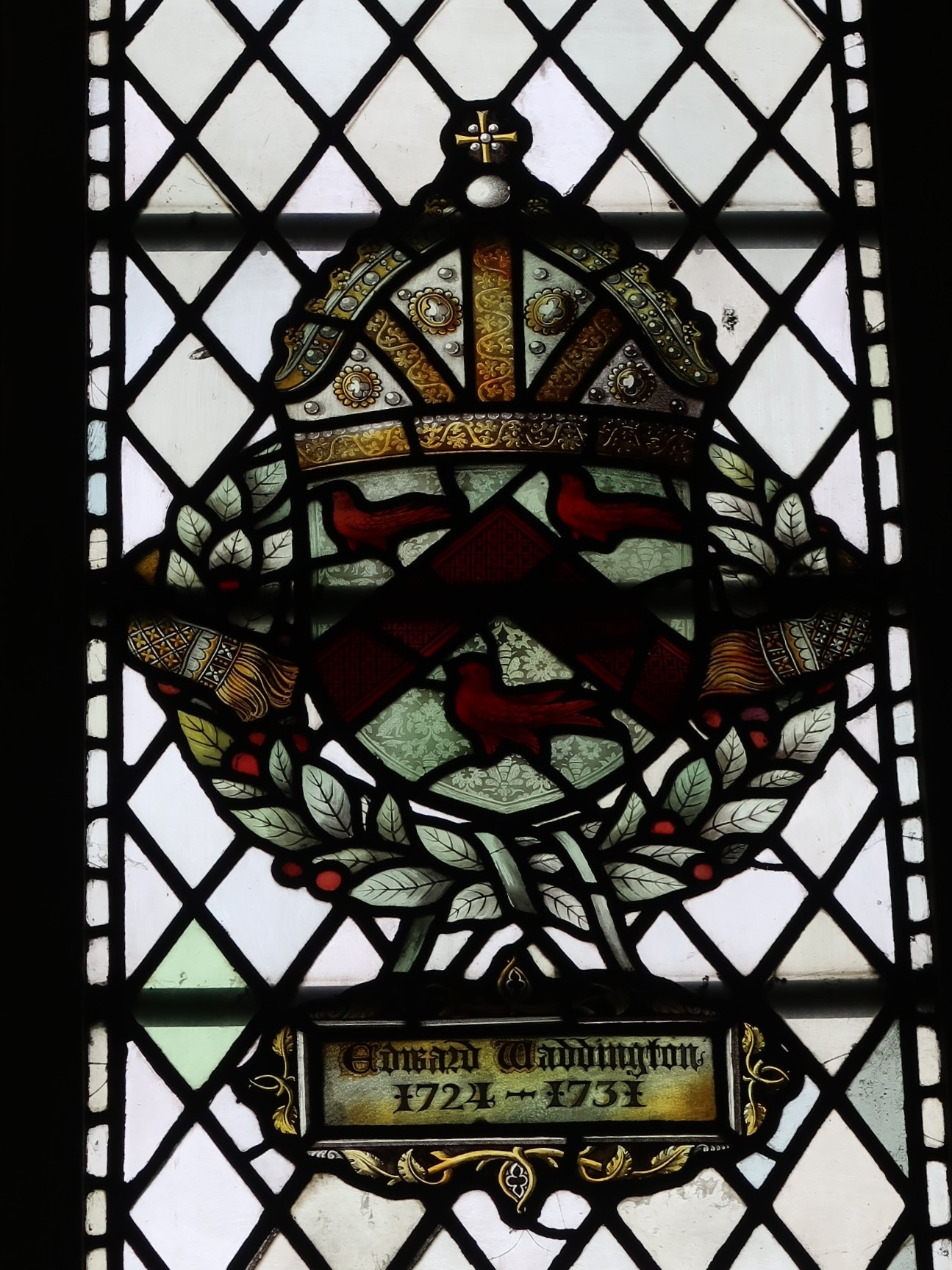
Bishop Edward Waddington - memorial window

Edward Waddington (1670?–1731) was an English prelate, bishop of Chichester from 1724 to 1731.

== Biography ==
Waddington was born in London in 1670 or 1671. He was educated at Eton College, and was admitted a scholar of King's College, Cambridge, on 30 June 1687, graduating B.A. in 1691 and M.A. in 1695, and proceeding D.D. in 1710. He was elected a fellow of King's College, and was made chaplain to the Bishop of Lincoln. In 1698, his grandfather dying and leaving him an estate of £500 a year, he resigned his fellowship, at the same time, presenting the college with twelve folio volumes, entitled 'Thesaurus Antiquitatum Romanorum,' collected by Grævius.

On 1 October 1702 he was presented by the crown to the rectory of Wexham, near Eton in Buckinghamshire. He was instituted rector of All Hallows the Great in Thames Street on 12 September 1712, was appointed chaplain in ordinary to George I in 1716, and was elected a fellow of Eton College on 9 November 1720. On the death of John Adams on 29 January 1719–20, he presented himself for election as provost of King's College, but was defeated by Andrew Snape. On 11 October 1724 he was consecrated bishop of Chichester in succession to Thomas Bowers. He found the Episcopal palace in a ruinous condition, and refitted it at his own charge. In 1730 he entered into a controversy with Nathaniel Lardner on the prosecution of Thomas Woolston for writing against the reality of Christ's miracles. Lardner's plea for freedom of statement did not meet with Waddington's approval, and several letters on the subject passed between them.

== Family life ==
Waddington died without issue at Chichester on 8 September 1731, and was buried in the cathedral. He was a liberal benefactor to Eton College, to which he left his library. He was married, on 20 June 1699, to Frances, daughter of Jonathan Newey of Worcestershire. She died on 5 September 1728. Most of Waddington's wealth descended to his nieces, one of whom, Elizabeth Price, in 1731 made a runaway match with Isaac Maddox at one time his chaplain, and afterwards bishop of Worcester.

Waddington was the author of several published sermons. His portrait was painted by Hamlet Winstanley, and was engraved by John Faber the younger (reproduced above).

Church of England titles
Preceded by Thomas Bowers	Bishop of Chichester; 1724–1731	Succeeded by Francis Hare
