= Nicholas Frayling =

21st-century English Anglican Dean of Chichester

The Very Reverend Nicholas Frayling KStJ
- Dean of Chichester
- Church: Church of England
- Diocese: Diocese of Chichester
- In office: 2002 to 2014
- Predecessor: John Treadgold
- Successor: Stephen Waine
- Other post: Rector of Liverpool (1987–2002)

Orders
- Ordination: 1971 (deacon); 1972 (priest)

Personal details
- Born: Nicholas Arthur Frayling; 29 February 1944 (age 82) London, England
- Denomination: Anglicanism
- Education: Repton School
- Alma mater: University of Exeter; Cuddesdon College

Nicholas Arthur Frayling KStJ (born 29 February 1944) is a British Church of England priest. From September 2002 to February 2014, he served as the Dean of Chichester.

== Early life and education ==
Frayling was born on 29 February 1944 in South London, England. His father, Major Arthur Frederick Frayling, OBE (1910–1993), late of the Royal Army Service Corps, was chairman of the Hudson's Bay fur auction house in London and of the International Fur Trade Federation; his mother, Barbara Kathleen ("Betty"), daughter of record and audio equipment store owner Alfred Imhof, was a driver in international car rallies, and won the RAC Rally with her brother, Godfrey Imhof, in 1952. His brother, Christopher, is a British educationalist and writer.

Frayling was educated at Repton School, a private school in Repton, Derbyshire. He studied theology at the University of Exeter, graduating with a Bachelor of Arts (BA) degree in 1969. He trained for ordination at Cuddesdon College, an Anglican theological college near Oxford.

== Ordained ministry ==
Frayling was ordained in the Church of England as a deacon in 1971 and as a priest in 1972. From 1971 to 1974, he served his curacy at St John's Church, Peckham, in the Diocese of Southwark. He then served as Vicar of All Saints Church, Tooting, which is also in the Diocese of Southwark.

In 1983, Frayling moved to the Diocese of Liverpool where he served as a canon residentiary and the Precentor of Liverpool Cathedral. Then, from 1987 to 2002, he was Rector of Liverpool and as such was rector of the Church of Our Lady and Saint Nicholas. In 1989, he was appointed an honorary canon of Liverpool Cathedral.

In September 2002, Frayling became Dean of Chichester. It was announced in September 2013 that he would retire from full-time ministry in the following year. He subsequently retired on 28 February 2014.

=== Views ===
In July 2013, Frayling held a public talk at Chichester Cathedral on the issue of same-sex marriage, as part of the annual Chichester Festivities. He expressed his view on homosexuality as being "not a choice, but a given".

Frayling is a vocal supporter of interfaith relations and political reconciliation. He has lectured on these subjects in Switzerland, Ireland, the United States, and Israel/Palestine.

== Later life ==
From1 May 2014 to June 2023, Frayling served as Dean of the Priory of England and the Islands of the Most Venerable Order of the Hospital of St John of Jerusalem (commonly known as the Order of Saint John). As such, he was also a trustee of St John Ambulance.

== Other ==
Nicholas Frayling is a former trustee of the Institute for Food, Brain and Behaviour and a former chairman of its predecessor organisation Natural Justice.

A 2012 portrait of Frayling, one of 12 heads of Contributors to British Sculpture was exhibited at Yorkshire Sculpture Park in 2013.

== Honours ==
In 2001, Frayling was awarded an honorary Doctor of Laws (LLD) degree by the University of Liverpool. In 2003, he was appointed an Honorary Fellow of Liverpool John Moores University. He was granted the Freedom of the City of Chichester in 2014. Frayling was appointed Knight of the Order of St John (KStJ), in April 2020.

== Selected works ==
- Pardon and Peace: Making of the Peace Process in Ireland
