= Anthony Rushe =

English cleric

Anthony Rushe D.D. (died 1 April 1577) was a Canon of Windsor from 1566 to 1577 and Dean of Chichester from 1570 to 1577.

== Career ==
He was a scholar at The King's School, Canterbury and educated at Magdalen College, Oxford where he graduated BA in 1554. He was awarded MA in 1558 from Cambridge.

He was appointed:

- Master of The King's School, Canterbury 1561
- Chaplain to Thomas Radclyffe, 3rd Earl of Sussex
- Rector of Woodham Walter, Essex 1565
- Rector of Brightling, Sussex 1565 - 1569
- Rector of Calverton, Buckinghamshire 1566
- Chaplain to Queen Elizabeth I
- Rector of Osgarwick, Kent 1568
- Canon of Canterbury Cathedral 1568
- Rector of St Olave's Church, Southwark 1569
- Dean of Chichester 1570 - 1577

He was appointed to the fourth stall in St George's Chapel, Windsor Castle in 1566 and held this until he died in 1577. He was buried in the chapel.
