= Dean of Chichester =

Dean of Chichester Cathedral, England

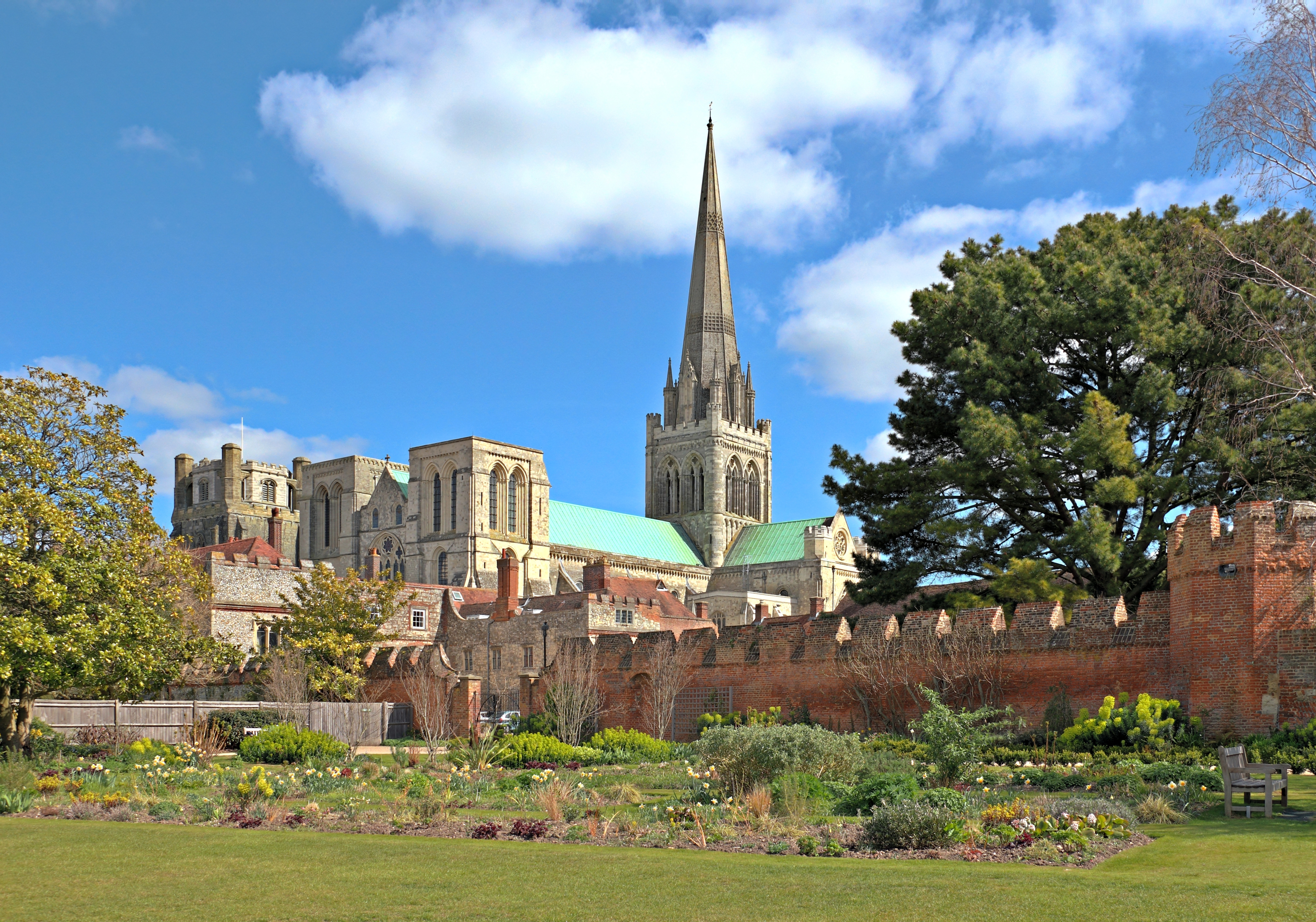
Chichester Cathedral

The Dean of Chichester is the dean of Chichester Cathedral in Sussex, England.

Bishop Ralph is credited with the foundation of the current cathedral after the original structure built by Stigand was largely destroyed by fire in 1114. He did not confine his activities to rebuilding the cathedral, but provided for a more complete constitution of his chapter by also creating the offices of dean, precentor, chancellor and treasurer. These four officials were to ensure the proper conduct of church services, the care of its building and the supervision of subordinates. Beneath them were the canons of the cathedral, about 26 in the medieval period. The dean was elected by the canons and had the power to act in administrative matters only with their consent. He and his staff were subject to the bishop's authority.

The dean headed the cathedral community and had jurisdiction over all the Chichester city parishes, with the exception of All Saints', which was under the administration of the Archbishop of Canterbury. The four ancient posts of dean and canons still exist within the cathedral and their functions are similar to their ancient role, although somewhat diminished, as other church organisations have now taken over some of their powers.

== List ==
=== High Medieval ===
- 1115 Odo
- 1115 Richard
- 1125 Matthew
- 1144 Richard
- 1150 John de Greneford (afterward Bishop of Chichester, 1173)
- 1176 Jordan de Meleburn
- 1178 Seffrid II (afterward Bishop of Chichester, 1180)
- 1180 Matthew de Chichester
- 1190 Nicholas de Aquila
- 1197 Seffride
- 1210–1212 In the hands of the king
- 1220 Simon de Perigord
- 1230 Walter
- 1232 Thomas de Lichfield
- 1250 Geoffrey
- 1256 Walter de Glocestria
- 1295 Thomas de Berghstede

=== Late Medieval ===
- ?-1306 William de Grenefeld (afterward Archbishop of York, 1306)
- 1307-1308 Raymond de Goth or Raimundus de Got, Cardinal Deacon of Santa Maria Nova
- 1308-1316John de St Leophardo
- 1318-1340 Henry de Garland
- ?-1349 Walter de Segrave
- 1349-1362William Lenn (afterward Bishop of Chichester, 1362)
- 1362-? Nicholas de Aston
- ?-1382 Roger de Freton
- 1382–1386 Richard le Scrope (afterward Bishop of Coventry and Lichfield, 1386)
- 1389–1390 William de Lullyngton
- ?-1396 Stephen Palosius (Cardinal priest of S. Marcellus)
- 1396–1399 Christopher Marini (Cardinal priest of S. Cyriacus)
- 1397–1407 John de Maydenhith (B.C.L.)
- 1407–1412 John Haseley
- ?–1417 Richard Talbot (afterward Bishop of Dublin, 1417)
- ?–1424 William Milton
- 1425 John Patten or John Waynflete
- 1425-? John Crutchere
- 1455-1478 John Waynfleet
- 1479-1501 John Cloos
- 1501-1503 Robert Prychard
- 1504-? Geoffrey Symeon
- 1507-1510 John Young
- 1517-1518 Thomas Larke
- 1518-1541 William Fleshmonger

=== Early modern ===
- 1541–1548 Richard Caurden
- 1549–1551 Giles Eyre
- 1551–1553 Bartholomew Traheron
- 1553 Thomas Sampson (not installed)
- 1553–1557 William Pye
- 1558–1566 Hugh Turnbull
- 1566–1570 Richard Curteys (afterward Bishop of Chichester, 1571)
- 1570–1577 Anthony Rushe
- 1577–1601 Martin Culpepper
- 1601–1630 William Thorne
- 1630–1634 Francis Dee (afterward Bishop of Peterborough, 1634)
- 1634–1635 Richard Steward
- 1642 George Aglionby (nominal)
- 1646–1660 Bruno Ryves (afterward Dean of Windsor, 1660)
- 1660–1663 Joseph Henshaw (afterward Bishop of Peterborough, 1663)
- 1663–1669 Joseph Gulston
- 1669–1671 Nathaniel Crew (afterward Bishop of Oxford, 1671)
- 1671–1672 Lambrocus Thomas
- 1672–1688 George Stradling
- 1688–1699 Francis Hawkins
- 1699–1715 William Hayley
- 1715–1727 Thomas Sherlock (afterward Bishop of Bangor, 1727)
- 1727–1735 John Newey
- 1735–1739 Thomas Hayley
- 1739–1741 James Hargraves
- 1741–1754 William Ashburnham (afterward Bishop of Chichester, 1754)
- 1754–1770 Thomas Ball
- 1770–1790 Charles Harward (afterward Dean of Exeter, 1790)

=== Late modern ===
- 1790 Combe Miller
- 1814–1824 Christopher Bethell
- 1824 Samuel Slade
- 1830 George Chandler
- 1859–1875 Walter Hook
- 1876 John Burgon
- 1888 Francis Pigou (afterward Dean of Bristol, 1892)
- 1892 Richard Randall
- 1902 John Hannah
- 1929 Arthur Duncan Jones
- 1955 Walter Hussey
- 1977 Robert Holtby
- 1989 John Treadgold
- 2002–2014 Nicholas Frayling
- 2015–2023 Stephen Waine
- 14 September 2024 – present: Edward Dowler

== See also ==
- Bishop of Chichester
- Archdeacon of Chichester

== Sources ==
- Dean and Chapter (2021). "Our team". Dean and Chapter of Chichester Cathedral.
- Diana E. Greenway (1996). "Deans". Fasti Ecclesiae Anglicanae 1066–1300: volume 5: Chichester. Institute of Historical Research.
- Hennessy, George (1900). Chichester Diocese Clergy Lists: Clergy Succession from the earliest time to the year 1900. London: St Peters Press.
- Hobbs, Mary, ed. (1994). Chichester Cathedral: An Historic Survey. Chichester: Phillimore. ISBN 0-85033-924-3.
- Horn, Joyce M, ed. (1964). "Deans". Chichester Diocese. Fasti Ecclesiae Anglicanae 1300-1541. Vol. 7. London: Institute of Historical Research 4-6. British History Online. Web.
- Page, William, ed. (1973). "Cathedral of Chichester". A History of the County of Sussex: Volume 2. Institute of Historical Research.
- Stephens, W.R.W (1876). Memorials of the See of Chichester and Cathedral Church of Chichester. London: Bentley. OCLC 1737721.
- "Who Was Who, A & C Black, 1920–2008; online edn". Oxford University Press. December 2007. – Subscription required.
