= Thomas Hayley (priest) =

Thomas Hayley was the Dean of Chichester from 1735 to 1739.

He was from Cleobury and matriculated from All Souls College in 1698. A Prebendary of Chichester from 1705 to 1735 he was Rector of Dry Drayton from 1718 to 1724; then Vicar of Amport, Hampshire. He died on 12 August 1739.

Church of England titles
Preceded by John Newey	Dean of Chichester; 1735–1739	Succeeded by James Hargraves
