= William Pye (priest) =

Dean of Chichester (died 1557)

William Pye (died September 1557) was Dean of Chichester from 1553 to 1557, a Canon of Westminster from 1554 to 1556, and a Canon of Windsor in 1557.

== Career ==
He was a Fellow of Oriel College, Oxford in 1529. He was appointed principal of St Mary Hall in 1537.

He was appointed:

- Archdeacon of Berkshire in 1545
- Canon of Lichfield Cathedral in 1550
- Canon of Wells Cathedral in 1553
- Dean of Chichester from 1553 to 1557
- Prebendary of Westminster Abbey 1554
- Rector of the Church of St Mary, Chedzoy 1554

He was also Vice President of the Council in the marches of Wales.

He was appointed to the first stall in St George's Chapel, Windsor Castle in January 1557 and died in September that year.
