= Argyll Arms =

Listed pub in Soho, London

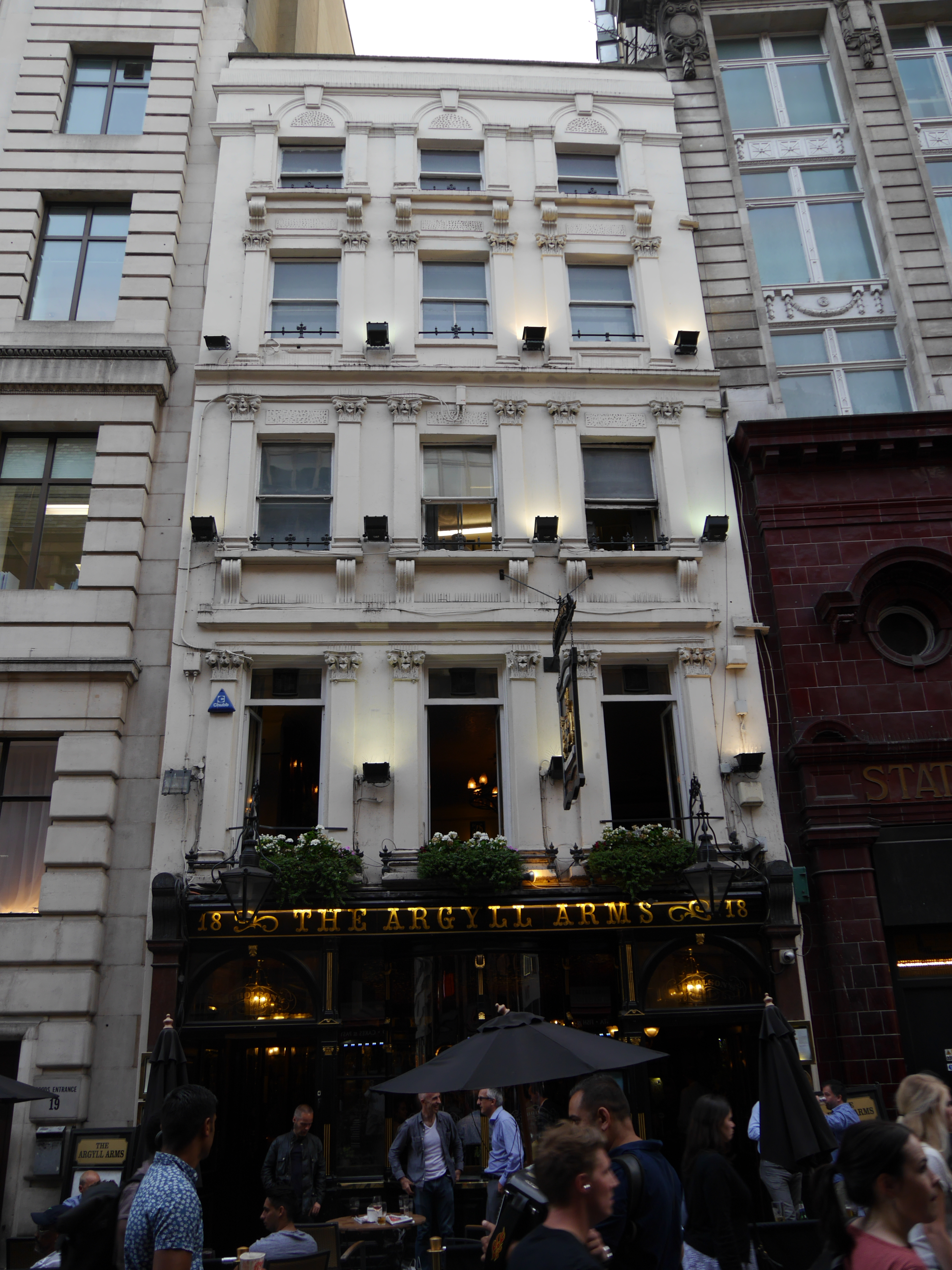
- The pub in 2014

General information
- Type: Public house
- Location: 18 Argyll Street, Soho, London, England
- Coordinates: 51.515061°N 0.14139°W
- Year built: 1868; 158 years ago
- Renovated: c. 1895 and 20th century (altered); 2022 (refurbished)
- Owner: Mitchells & Butlers

Design and construction
- Designations

Listed Building – Grade II*
- Official name: The Argyll public house
- Designated: 9 January 1970
- Reference no.: 1066496

Renovating team
- Architect: Robert Sawyer (c. 1895)

Website
- Official website

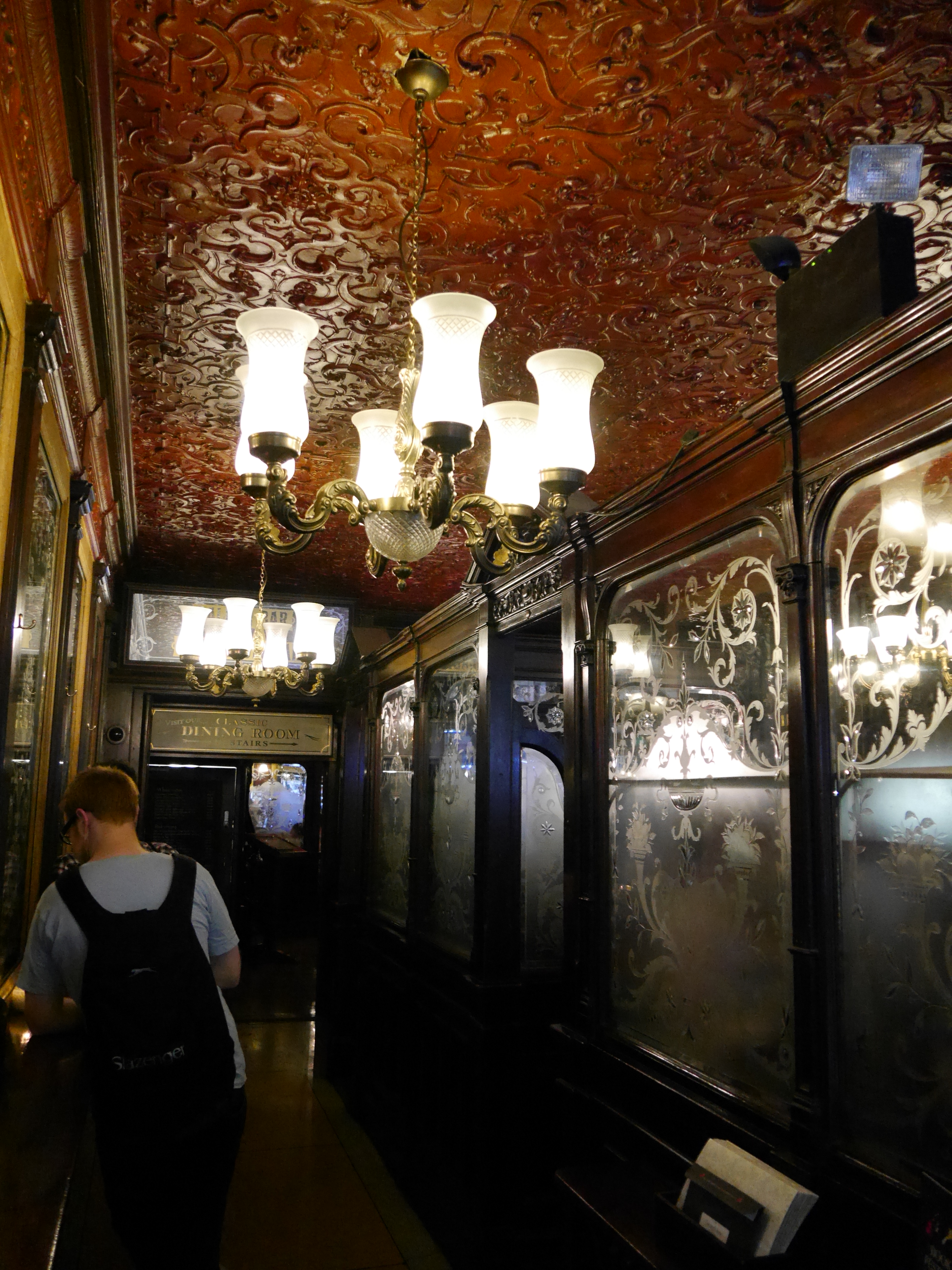
The interior in 2014

The Argyll Arms is a Grade II* listed public house on Argyll Street in Soho, London, England. Dating from 1868 and remodelled around 1895 by Robert Sawyer, it retains a largely intact interior. The pub is included on CAMRA's National Inventory of Historic Pub Interiors with a three‑star rating for "outstanding national historic importance". It was refurbished in 2022 and, as of July 2026, is owned by Mitchells & Butlers and operated under the Nicholson's brand.

== History ==
The public house dates from 1868, with substantial alterations carried out around 1895 by Robert Sawyer, including a new ground‑floor front and a remodelled interior, followed by further minor changes in the 20th century. It is located close to the site of the former Argyll House, the London residence of the Dukes of Argyll.

On 9 January 1970, the Argyll Arms was designated a Grade II* listed building. The interior is recognised by the Campaign for Real Ale (CAMRA), which includes it on the National Inventory of Historic Pub Interiors with a three‑star rating, indicating "outstanding national historic importance".

The pub underwent a refurbishment in April 2022, which included internal alterations such as new shelving, updated bar fittings, adjustments to the servery and changes to the toilet layout. As of July 2026, the pub's freehold is owned by Mitchells & Butlers, and it is operated under the Nicholson's brand.

== Architecture ==
=== Exterior ===
The building is of brick, with the street front finished in stucco and the roofline hidden behind a low parapet. Its narrow frontage leads into a long side corridor that gives access to bars on the right and at the rear, with the servery positioned on the right to link the different rooms.

The façade rises five storeys in three bays. Entrances to either side are framed by red‑granite pilasters with dark stone bases, and a curved timber‑and‑glass front spans between them. The upper windows on the second to fourth floors are set between plain pilasters and sub‑Corinthian columns. Those on the fifth floor have moulded imposts and small decorative panels above. A simple parapet finishes the elevation.

=== Interior ===
The corridor's left wall is lined with mahogany panelling and mirrors decorated with etched motifs of urns, cornucopias, swags and foliage. On the right, a glazed screen with similar ornament divides three drinking areas, each marked by a broken pediment above its entrance. Between these openings are further decorated screens, and a doorway connects the two front bars. The bar counter is contemporary, with simple panelled detailing, while the bar‑back has been altered in its lower sections; one part is angled forward with doors and etched glass and carries a clock above. Further along, a broader section has a segmental pediment and a carved frieze.

The large rear room has walling that combines panelling and mirrors, and the bar counter is interrupted in two places by cased iron columns. A richly patterned Lincrusta ceiling runs throughout. The staircase to the first floor has an ornate iron balustrade with scrolling detail, while the stair from the first to the second floor has more modest cast‑iron balusters.

Other London pubs with surviving small drinking rooms include the Prince Alfred in Maida Vale and the Barley Mow in Marylebone, while at the Princess Louise in Holborn the original layout was reinstated during a major restoration in 2008.

== See also ==
- Grade II* listed buildings in the City of Westminster (A–Z)
