= Royal Artillery Boer War Memorial =

War memorial in London

Coordinates: 51°30′20″N 0°07′52″W

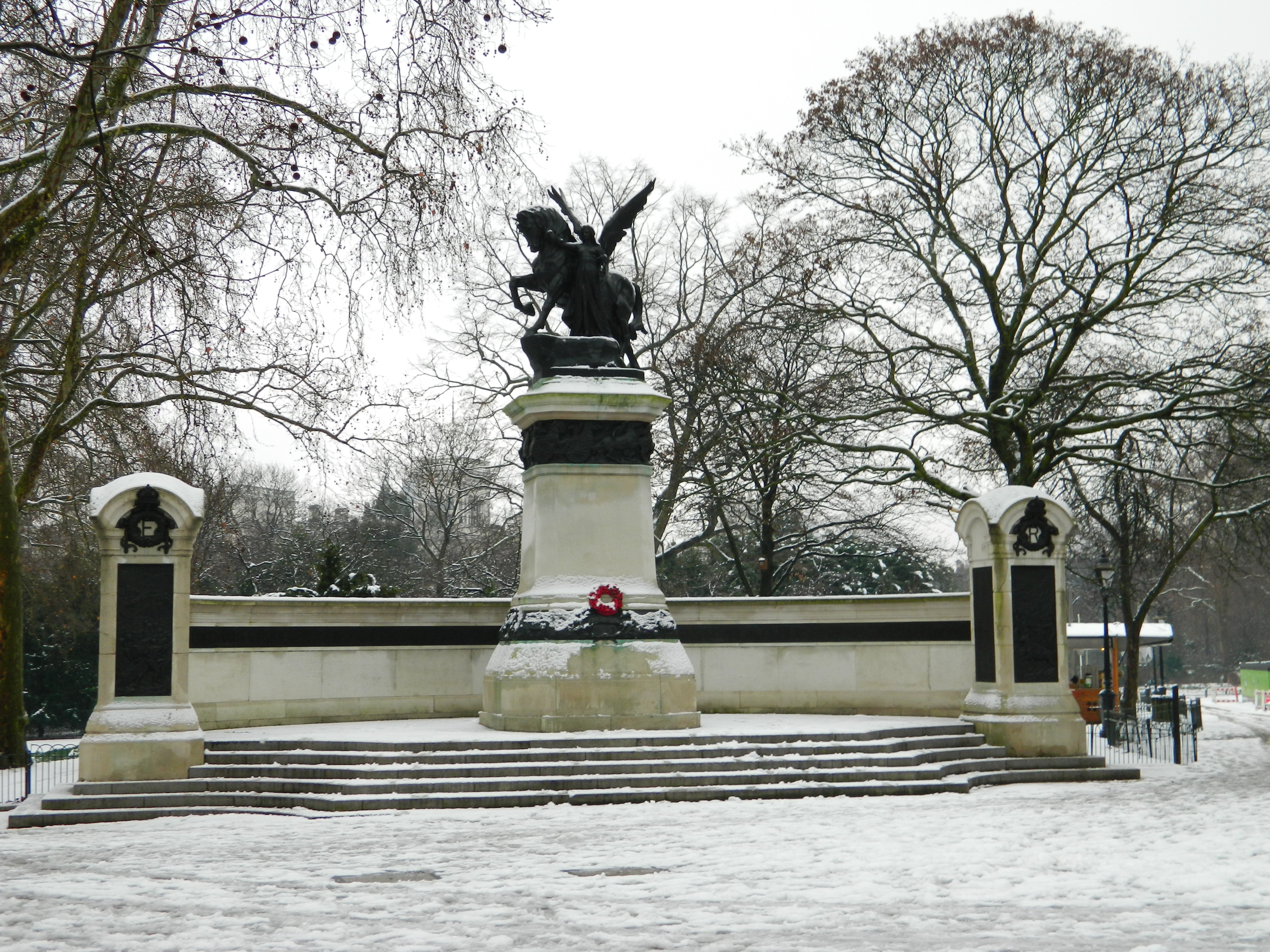
The memorial in December 2011

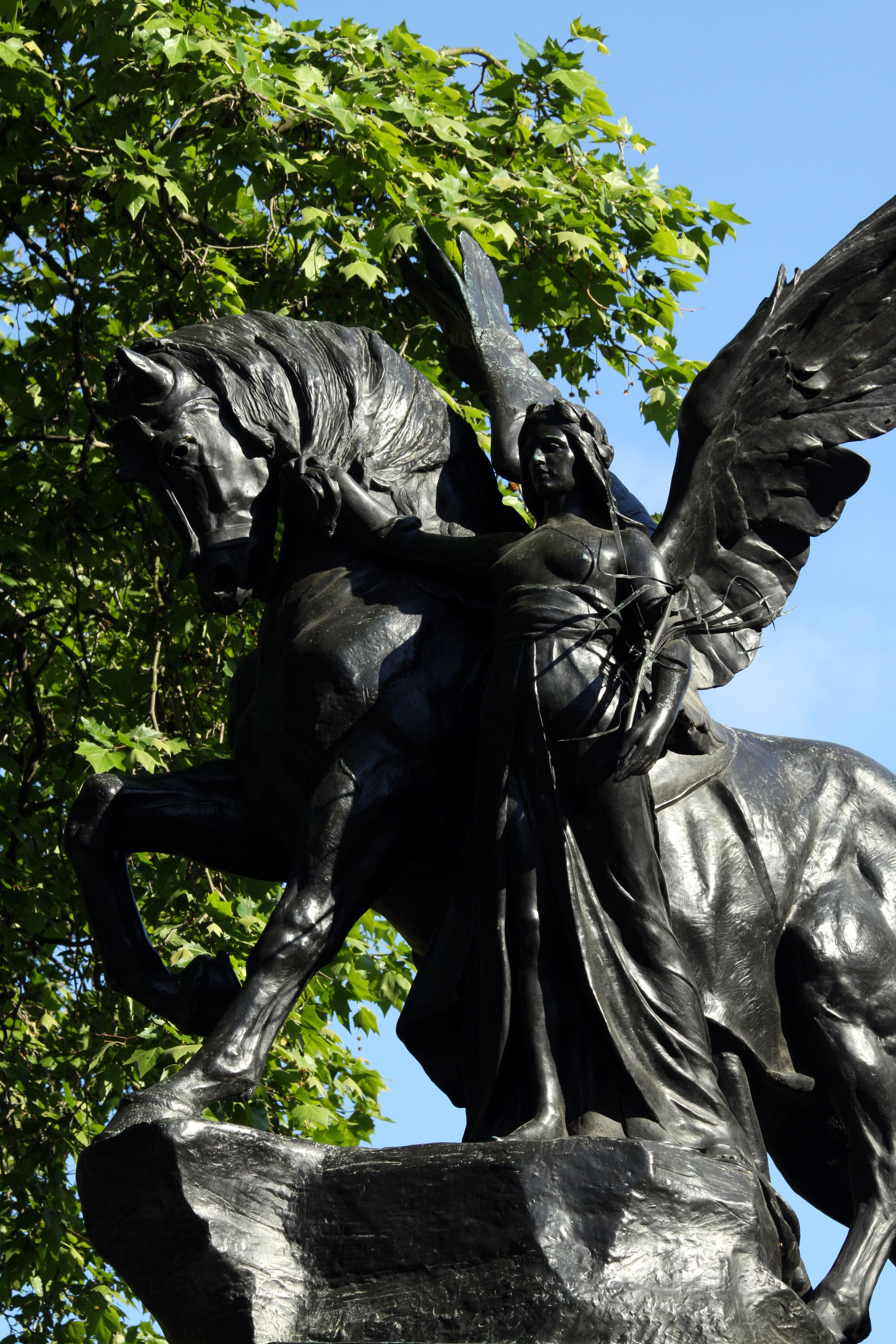
Detail of the sculpture

The Royal Artillery Boer War Memorial is located on the south side of The Mall in Central London, close to the junction with Horse Guards Road at the northeast corner of St James's Park. Unveiled in 1910, it marks the deaths of the 1,083 soldiers of the Royal Artillery who died in the Second Boer War from 1899 to 1902 It has been a listed building since 1970.

The memorial comprises several bronze sculptural elements by William Robert Colton, mounted on a central square plinth before a curved wall of Portland stone, all standing on granite platform with five steps up from The Mall to the north. Colton had already made the Worcester Boer War Memorial, erected in the grounds of Worcester Cathedral in 1908, including bronze statues of a winged Victory and a soldier. The stone elements were designed by Aston Webb as part of his larger project to upgrade The Mall, which included a new façade for Buckingham Palace, and a wider tree-lined road from the Victoria Memorial to Admiralty Arch. The memorial faces across the road to steps leading up to the Duke of York Column, the equestrian statue of Edward VII and the Guards Crimean War Memorial in Waterloo Place, which are on the same alignment.

The tall plinth supports a life-size bronze statue of a horse representing the Spirit of War, being calmed by a winged personification of Peace holding an olive branch (the figure is sometimes described as Fame). Friezes of bronze plaques near the top and bottom of the plinth show war scenes in high relief, with the motto of the Royal Artillery, "UBIQUE" (everywhere) and "QUO. FAS / ET / GLORIA / DUCUNT" ("where right and glory lead"). Further bronze plaques are mounted as a frieze along the concave wall, bearing the relief inscription "ERECTED BY OFFICERS AND MEN OF THE ROYAL ARTILLERY IN MEMORY OF THEIR HONOURED DEAD IN SOUTH AFRICA 1899-1902". A stone pillar at each end of the wall bears a low relief plaque of a war scene below a bronze wreath around a single initial, "E "(left) and "R" (right). The sides of the pillars bear further plaques listing the names of 1,083 war dead, including some who died after the ceasefire on 31 May 1902, with 61 officers listed together on one panel in order of rank. The panels of names were originally installed horizontally on the floor of the granite platform: after complaints that visitors were inadvertently dishonouring the dead by treading on their names, the panels were resited to the walls.

The memorial was unveiled by Prince Arthur, Duke of Connaught on 20 July 1910. The unveiling was preceded by a memorial service at St Paul's Cathedral, with an electric impulse sent from the cathedral used to drop the flags concealing the memorial.

It is Grade II* listed on the National Heritage List for England. The heritage listing describes the monument as "a war memorial of clear architectural and sculptural quality, designed by two well-respected artists" (Aston Webb and William Colton).

Colton's design for the Staffordshire County War Memorial reused the sculptural group, on a tall stone plinth. After Colton's death in 1921, the Staffordshire memorial was completed by Leonard Stanford Merrifield in 1923.

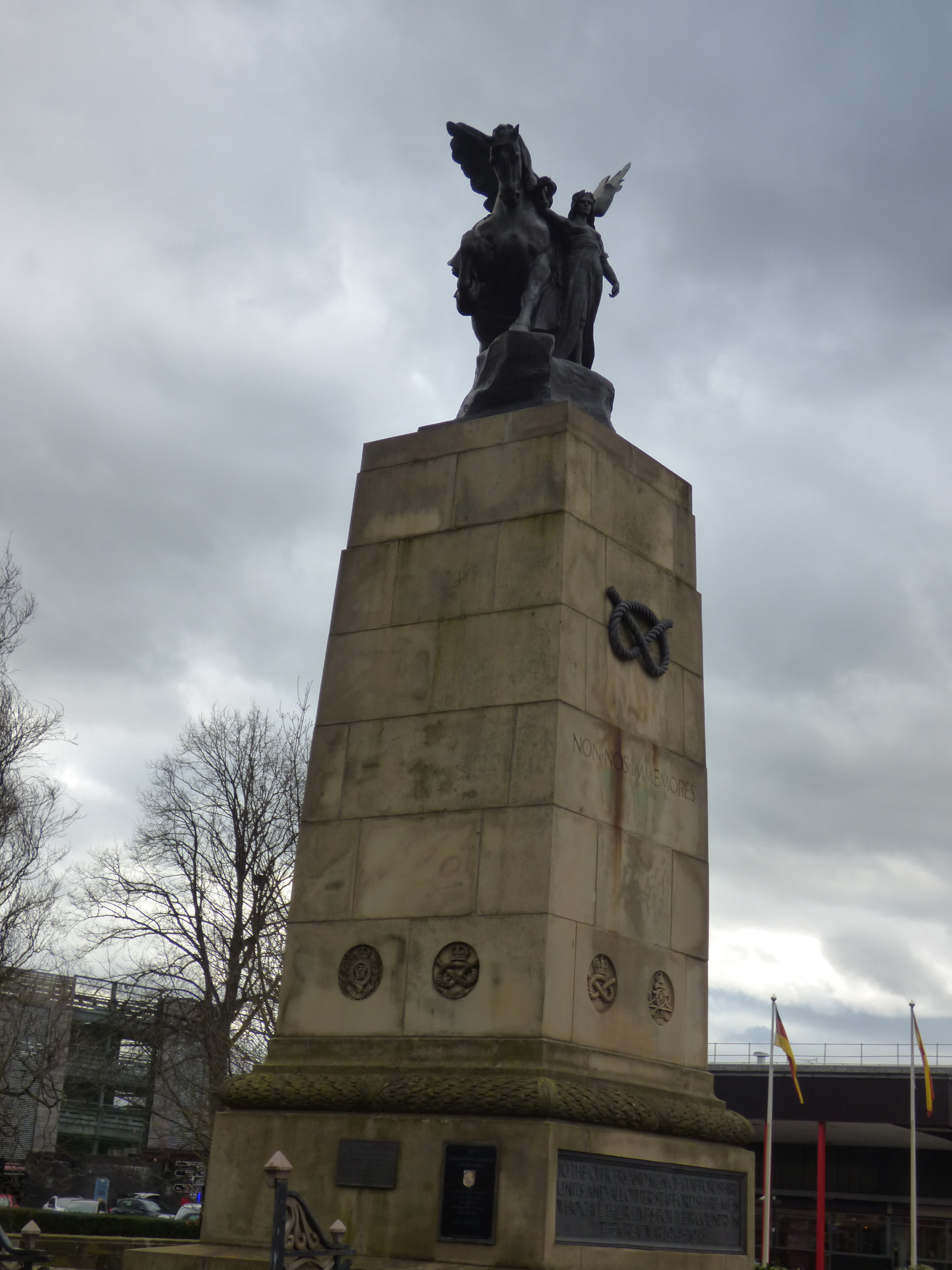
Staffordshire County War Memorial

== See also ==
- Royal Artillery Memorial at Hyde Park Corner
- Grade II* listed war memorials in England
- Grade II* listed buildings in the City of Westminster (A–Z)
