= Grade II* listed buildings in the City of Westminster (A–Z) =

There are over 20,000 Grade II* listed buildings in England. This page is a list of these buildings in the City of Westminster.

== Buildings ==
Name	Location	Type	Completed (Note: The date given is the date used by Historic England as significant for the initial building or that of an important part in the structure's description.)	Date designated	Grid ref. (Note: The grid reference is based on the British national grid reference system, sometimes known as OSGB36, used by the Ordnance Survey.) Geo-coordinates	Entry number (Note: The "List Entry Number" is a unique number assigned to each listed building and scheduled monument by Historic England.)	Image
Aspinall Curzon, and Stable Quarters at Rear	Curzon Street, Mayfair, W1	Town House	c. 1750–1760	24 February 1958	TQ2848180212; 51°30′22″N 0°09′01″W	1221136	Aspinall Curzon, and Stable Quarters at Rear More images
Baker Street Station: Main Entrance Building and Metropolitan, Circle and Hammersmith and City Line Platforms	City of Westminster	Footbridge	1911–1913	26 March 1987	TQ2799082004; 51°31′21″N 0°09′24″W	1239815	Baker Street Station: Main Entrance Building and Metropolitan, Circle and Hammersmith and City Line Platforms More images
Bourdon House	City of Westminster	House	c. 1760	24 February 1958	TQ2867280729; 51°30′39″N 0°08′50″W	1210196	Bourdon House More images
11 and 14 Cavendish Square, with bridge	Cavendish Square, Marylebone W1	Town houses	c. 1770	10 September 1954	TQ2878581433; 51°31′02″N 0°08′43″W	1066306	11 and 14 Cavendish Square, with bridge More images
Broadcasting House	City of Westminster	Office	1930–1932	16 January 1981	TQ2888481593; 51°31′07″N 0°08′38″W	1265570	Broadcasting House More images
Buckingham Gate lodge, gate piers, gates and railings	St James, City of Westminster	Gate	1900–1901	9 January 1970	TQ2915979577; 51°30′01″N 0°08′26″W	1357252	Buckingham Gate lodge, gate piers, gates and railings More images
Buxton Memorial Fountain, Victoria Tower Gardens	City of Westminster	Fountain	1865	5 February 1970	TQ3027179131; 51°29′46″N 0°07′29″W	1066151	Buxton Memorial Fountain, Victoria Tower Gardens More images
Canada House	City of Westminster	Square	1824–1826	5 February 1970	TQ2992880438; 51°30′29″N 0°07′45″W	1217724	Canada House More images
Canon Row Police Station	City of Westminster	Police Station	1898–1902	1 December 1987	TQ3021979769; 51°30′07″N 0°07′31″W	1357244	Canon Row Police Station
Carlton Club	69 and 70 St James's Street, St James's, SW1A 1PJ	Gentlemen's Club	1826–1827	5 February 1970	TQ2925880184; 51°30′21″N 0°08′20″W	1235897	Carlton Club More images
Chapel (only) to the Hospital of St John and St Elizabeth	City of Westminster	Chapel	1862–1863	1 December 1987	TQ2667583174; 51°32′00″N 0°10′30″W	1066244	Chapel (only) to the Hospital of St John and St Elizabeth More images
Charlwood and Morgan Houses, Hostel, Community Centre, Boiler House and Walls	Lillington Gardens, Vauxhall Bridge Road, Pimlico, SW1	Flats	1964–1968	22 December 1998	TQ2952278572; 51°29′29″N 0°08′09″W	1246695	Charlwood and Morgan Houses, Hostel, Community Centre, Boiler House and Walls More images
Christ Church, Cosway Street, Marylebone	City of Westminster	Church	1824-5	10 September 1954	TQ2730281893; 51°31′18″N 0°09′59″W	1356972	Christ Church, Cosway Street, Marylebone More images
Civil Service Rifles War Memorial	Somerset House, Strand	War memorial	1924	1 December 1987	TQ3073680717; 51°30′37″N 0°07′03″W	1237096	Civil Service Rifles War Memorial More images
St Cyprian's, Clarence Gate	City of Westminster	Church	1901–1903	10 September 1954	TQ2775082209; 51°31′28″N 0°09′36″W	1237476	St Cyprian's, Clarence Gate More images
St Gabriel's, Warwick Square	City of Westminster	Church	1851–1853	24 February 1958	TQ2907578389; 51°29′23″N 0°08′32″W	1357369	St Gabriel's, Warwick Square More images
St James's Church, Paddington	City of Westminster	Church	1841-3	25 September 1951	TQ2663280923; 51°30′47″N 0°10′35″W	1237437	St James's Church, Paddington More images
St John's Wood Church	City of Westminster	Church	1813–1814	10 September 1954	TQ2714382886; 51°31′50″N 0°10′06″W	1264852	St John's Wood Church More images
St Mark's Church, Hamilton Terrace	St John's Wood, City of Westminster	Church	1846–1847	5 February 1981	TQ2617483036; 51°31′56″N 0°10′57″W	1066681	St Mark's Church, Hamilton Terrace More images
Church of St Mary	City of Westminster	Steps	1788–1791	25 September 1951	TQ2669881748; 51°31′14″N 0°10′31″W	1065972	Church of St Mary More images
St Mary's, Bourne Street	Belgravia, City of Westminster	Church	Late C19 – late C20	9 January 1970	TQ2824978616; 51°29′31″N 0°09′15″W	1357230	St Mary's, Bourne Street More images
Church of St Matthew	29 St. Petersburgh Place, Bayswater	Church	1880	25 September 1951	TQ2561980744; 51°30′42″N 0°11′28″W	1236098	Church of St Matthew More images
Church of St Paul	Wilton Place, Knightsbridge	Church	1840–1843	24 February 1958	TQ2810579669; 51°30′05″N 0°09′21″W	1066084	Church of St Paul More images
Church of St Peter	City of Westminster	Church	1824–1827	24 February 1958	TQ2858379295; 51°29′53″N 0°08′56″W	1356980	Church of St Peter More images
St Stephen's, Rochester Row	City of Westminster	Church	1847–1849	24 February 1958	TQ2951779006; 51°29′43″N 0°08′08″W	1235247	St Stephen's, Rochester Row More images
Church of the Annunciation, Marble Arch	City of Westminster	Church	1912–1913	10 September 1954	TQ2787381105; 51°30′52″N 0°09′31″W	1066358	Church of the Annunciation, Marble Arch More images
Church of the Immaculate Conception, Farm Street	City of Westminster	Church	1844–1849	24 February 1958	TQ2854580577; 51°30′34″N 0°08′57″W	1211842	Church of the Immaculate Conception, Farm Street More images
Clergy House and Archbishops House	Ambrosden Avenue, Victoria, SW1	Archbishops Palace	1895–1902	24 February 1958	TQ2931278990; 51°29′42″N 0°08′19″W	1210118	Clergy House and Archbishops House
Covent Garden Market	City of Westminster	Market Hall	1828–1830	24 February 1958	TQ3036080894; 51°30′43″N 0°07′22″W	1066949	Covent Garden Market More images
Crewe House	City of Westminster	House	Late 18th/early 19th century	24 February 1958	TQ2863680324; 51°30′26″N 0°08′52″W	1066942	Crewe House More images
Criterion Theatre and Restaurant	Piccadilly Circus, City of Westminster	Theatre	1870–1874	5 February 1970	TQ2958680626; 51°30′35″N 0°08′03″W	1265753	Criterion Theatre and Restaurant More images
Crocker's Folly Public House	St Johns Wood, City of Westminster	Public House	c. 1900	9 January 1970	TQ2669682344; 51°31′33″N 0°10′30″W	1357150	Crocker's Folly Public House More images
Dell Restaurant	Hyde Park, City of Westminster	Restaurant	1964	11 January 1995	TQ2780880056; 51°30′18″N 0°09′36″W	1251150	Dell Restaurant More images
Devonshire House Gates to Green Park and Gatepiers (opposite to Number 90 Piccadilly)	City of Westminster	Gate	Early 18th century	5 February 1970	TQ2887680174; 51°30′21″N 0°08′40″W	1226498	Devonshire House Gates to Green Park and Gatepiers (opposite to Number 90 Piccadilly) More images
Devonshire Lodge	26–28 Finchley Road, City of Westminster	Villa	c1830-40	10 September 1973	TQ2661683588; 51°32′13″N 0°10′33″W	1289804	Devonshire Lodge More images
Diocesan Hall	Westminster, City of Westminster	Church Hall	1895–1902	1 December 1987	TQ2929479023; 51°29′43″N 0°08′20″W	1066495	Diocesan Hall
Drinking Fountain in the Forecourt of Hertford House (the Wallace Collection)	City of Westminster	Drinking Fountain	c. 1878	23 July 1991	TQ2826881435; 51°31′02″N 0°09′10″W	1277828	Drinking Fountain in the Forecourt of Hertford House (the Wallace Collection) More images
Dudley House	Hyde Park, City of Westminster	House	18th century	24 February 1958	TQ2802180698; 51°30′39″N 0°09′24″W	1226028	Dudley House More images
Electricity Transformer Station	Moreton Street, Pimlico	Children's Playground	1964–1967	22 December 1998	TQ2958478439; 51°29′24″N 0°08′06″W	1271485	Electricity Transformer Station More images
Elephant and Rhinoceros Pavilion, London Zoo	City of Westminster	Animal House	1962–1965	12 June 1998	TQ2809483354; 51°32′04″N 0°09′16″W	1323694	Elephant and Rhinoceros Pavilion, London Zoo More images
6 Burlington Gardens	St James, City of Westminster	University Administration Office	1866–1869	9 January 1970	TQ2916380619; 51°30′35″N 0°08′25″W	1291018	6 Burlington Gardens More images
Fairchild House and Garden Walls	City of Westminster	Flats	1964–1968	22 December 1998	TQ2944578589; 51°29′29″N 0°08′13″W	1246691	Fairchild House and Garden Walls
Forecourt Railings and Gate Piers to Number 21	St James, City of Westminster	Gate	Mid 18th century	24 February 1958	TQ2912280298; 51°30′25″N 0°08′27″W	1292281	Forecourt Railings and Gate Piers to Number 21
Former Glyn Mills Bank (1 Fleet Street)	City of Westminster (partially)	Balustrade	1879	14 January 1970	TQ3111381091; 51°30′49″N 0°06′43″W	1066796	Former Glyn Mills Bank (1 Fleet Street) More images
Former Law Fire Insurance Office Number 16 (excluding the Former Numbers 13 and 14/15)	City of Westminster	Commercial Office	1858-9	26 January 1970	TQ3111681213; 51°30′53″N 0°06′43″W	1251120	Former Law Fire Insurance Office Number 16 (excluding the Former Numbers 13 and 14/15)
Former New Scotland Yard (Norman Shaw South Building)	City of Westminster	Police Station	1904-6	5 February 1970	TQ3027379758; 51°30′06″N 0°07′28″W	1357349	Former New Scotland Yard (Norman Shaw South Building) More images
Former Paymaster Generals Office Former Paymaster Generals Office (the Parliamentary Counsel)	Whitehall, City of Westminster	Government Office	1732-3	5 February 1970	TQ3007980156; 51°30′19″N 0°07′38″W	1357390	Former Paymaster Generals Office Former Paymaster Generals Office (the Parliamentary Counsel) More images
Forsythe House Pimlico Tram Public House and Garden Walls the Pimlico Tram Public House	City of Westminster	Flats	1964–1970	22 December 1998	TQ2947078486; 51°29′26″N 0°08′12″W	1246693	Forsythe House Pimlico Tram Public House and Garden Walls the Pimlico Tram Public House More images
Fountains and Terrace Walls with Lampstandards, Steps and Stone Bollards Enclosing the Square	City of Westminster	Wall	1840	5 February 1970	TQ3005980461; 51°30′29″N 0°07′38″W	1066235	Fountains and Terrace Walls with Lampstandards, Steps and Stone Bollards Enclosing the Square More images
French Protestant Church	Soho Square	Church	1893	5 February 1970	TQ2963881298; 51°30′57″N 0°07′59″W	1236283	French Protestant Church More images
Gates and Piers Between Norman Shaw North and South Buildings, Former New Scotland Yard	City of Westminster	Gate	1904	5 February 1970	TQ3028879782; 51°30′07″N 0°07′27″W	1066173	Gates and Piers Between Norman Shaw North and South Buildings, Former New Scotland Yard More images
Gates, Gatepiers and Railings to Queen's Gate	City of Westminster	Gate	1858	14 January 1970	TQ2639679647; 51°30′06″N 0°10′49″W	1217606	Gates, Gatepiers and Railings to Queen's Gate More images
Gates, Railings and Gate Piers to Number 2 Temple Place	City of Westminster	Gate	1895	5 February 1970	TQ3108580867; 51°30′42″N 0°06′45″W	1066232	Gates, Railings and Gate Piers to Number 2 Temple Place
Goodyer House	Lillington Gardens, Moreton Street, Pimlico, SW1	Flats	1967–1970	22 December 1998	TQ2955378463; 51°29′25″N 0°08′07″W	1246698	Goodyer House
55 Whitehall	City of Westminster	Government building	1951–52	5 February 1970	TQ3014680229; 51°30′22″N 0°07′34″W	1066106	55 Whitehall More images
Grosvenor Hotel	Belgravia, City of Westminster	Hotel	1860-1	9 January 1970	TQ2884779042; 51°29′44″N 0°08′43″W	1357254	Grosvenor Hotel More images
Guards Chapel, Wellington Barracks	City of Westminster	Military Chapel	Built 1838	9 January 1970	TQ2951879592; 51°30′02″N 0°08′08″W	1066441	Guards Chapel, Wellington Barracks More images
Gwydyr House	City of Westminster	Town House	c. 1772	5 February 1970	TQ3017280021; 51°30′15″N 0°07′33″W	1066107	Gwydyr House More images
Hallfield Primary School	Inverness Terrace, Bayswater W2	Primary school	1953–1954	29 March 1988	TQ2592881108; 51°30′54″N 0°11′12″W	1237491	Hallfield Primary School More images
Hampden House	61 Green Street, Mayfair, City of Westminster	House	c. 1730	14 January 1970	TQ2818780926; 51°30′46″N 0°09′15″W	1357056	Hampden House More images
Hanover Gate Lodge	Regent's Park, City of Westminster	Gate Lodge	c1822-3	13 January 1965	TQ2735982645; 51°31′42″N 0°09′56″W	1066689	Hanover Gate Lodge More images
Hanover Lodge	Regents Park, City of Westminster	Villa	c. 1827	5 February 1970	TQ2735282781; 51°31′47″N 0°09′56″W	1226115	Hanover Lodge More images
Harrington House	City of Westminster	House	c. 1720	9 January 1970	TQ3012480317; 51°30′25″N 0°07′35″W	1356938	Harrington House More images
Henry Wise House	Lillington Gardens, 53 Vauxhall Bridge Road, Pimlico, SW1	Flats	1964–1967	22 December 1998	TQ2948378601; 51°29′30″N 0°08′11″W	1246690	Henry Wise House
Her Majesty's Theatre	City of Westminster	Theatre	1704–1705	14 January 1970	TQ2973180451; 51°30′29″N 0°07′55″W	1357090	Her Majesty's Theatre More images
Hogarth House	City of Westminster	Council Flats	1899–1902	5 February 1970	TQ2990878648; 51°29′31″N 0°07′49″W	1211708	Hogarth House
Incorporated Accounts Hall	City of Westminster	Apartment	1895	20 September 1960	TQ3109880878; 51°30′42″N 0°06′44″W	1234514	Incorporated Accounts Hall More images
Kent Terrace	Regent's Park, City of Westminster	Terrace	1827	14 January 1970	TQ2751482515; 51°31′38″N 0°09′48″W	1221318	Kent Terrace
Lancaster Corner and Porchester Lodge	100 and 101 Bayswater Road, Bayswater W2	Semi-detached villas	Early 19th century	9 January 1970	TQ2617880661; 51°30′39″N 0°10′59″W	1218088	Lancaster Corner and Porchester Lodge More images
Lansdowne Club	9 Fitzmaurice Place, Mayfair W1	Clubhouse (formerly detached town house)	1762–1768	14 January 1970	TQ2880380447; 51°30′30″N 0°08′44″W	1066795	Lansdowne Club More images
Lock's of St James's	6 St James's Street, St James's	Terraced House	Late 17th century	24 February 1958	TQ2931180176; 51°30′21″N 0°08′18″W	1264869	Lock's of St James's More images
London House	32 St James's Square, St James's SW1	Terraced House	1819–21	5 February 1970	TQ2958880359; 51°30′26″N 0°08′03″W	1235830	London House More images
Lord High Admiral Public House	City of Westminster	Public House	1964–1967	22 December 1998	TQ2955778554; 51°29′28″N 0°08′07″W	1246696	Lord High Admiral Public House More images
Lyceum Theatre	City of Westminster	Dance Hall	1973	15 January 1973	TQ3055580851; 51°30′41″N 0°07′12″W	1066119	Lyceum Theatre More images
Marylebone Lower House North Westminster Community School	City of Westminster	Comprehensive School	1998	6 May 1998	TQ2712481914; 51°31′19″N 0°10′09″W	1119735	Marylebone Lower House North Westminster Community School More images
Messrs Goode	City of Westminster	Apartment	1875	5 February 1970	TQ2841080480; 51°30′31″N 0°09′04″W	1264593	Messrs Goode More images
Methodist Central Hall Westminster	City of Westminster	Meeting Hall	1905–11	24 February 1958	TQ2988979554; 51°30′00″N 0°07′48″W	1264457	Methodist Central Hall Westminster More images
Middlesex Guildhall	City of Westminster	Guildhall	17th century	5 February 1970	TQ3002279601; 51°30′01″N 0°07′41″W	1226369	Middlesex Guildhall More images
Fitzrovia Chapel	City of Westminster	Chapel	1891	5 February 1970	TQ2926381654; 51°31′08″N 0°08′18″W	1223496	Fitzrovia Chapel More images
Midland Bank	City of Westminster	Bank (financial)	1922-3	5 February 1970	TQ2936780512; 51°30′31″N 0°08′14″W	1226603	Midland Bank More images
Government Offices Great George Street and Archway Link with Foreign Office at East End of King Charles Street	City of Westminster	Courtyard	1898–1901	5 February 1970	TQ2995679753; 51°30′06″N 0°07′45″W	1066103	Government Offices Great George Street and Archway Link with Foreign Office at East End of King Charles Street More images
New Victoria Theatre	City of Westminster	Cinema	1929	28 June 1972	TQ2903579039; 51°29′44″N 0°08′33″W	1066085	New Victoria Theatre More images
Emmanuel Evangelical Church (formerly the Ninth Church of Christ Scientist)	City of Westminster	Sunday School	1926–30	18 July 1978	TQ2996879163; 51°29′47″N 0°07′45″W	1239810	Emmanuel Evangelical Church (formerly the Ninth Church of Christ Scientist) More images
Number 7 (including Former Number 6)	City of Westminster	Town House	c1754-6	5 February 1970	TQ3016279406; 51°29′55″N 0°07′34″W	1266309	Number 7 (including Former Number 6) More images
Numbers 17, 18 and 19 and Adjoining Mews Arch	City of Westminster	Mews	Early 19th century	24 February 1958	TQ2839679290; 51°29′53″N 0°09′06″W	1290194	Numbers 17, 18 and 19 and Adjoining Mews Arch
Church of Our Lady of the Assumption and St Gregory	Warwick Street, Soho	Embassy	c. 1730	24 February 1958	TQ2931180784; 51°30′40″N 0°08′17″W	1273895	Church of Our Lady of the Assumption and St Gregory More images
Oxford and Cambridge University Club	St James's, City of Westminster	Clubhouse	1836–1837	5 February 1970	TQ2942880154; 51°30′20″N 0°08′12″W	1357491	Oxford and Cambridge University Club More images
Paddington British Rail Maintenance Depot, East Block	City of Westminster	Garage	1966-8	14 April 1994	TQ2630581730; 51°31′13″N 0°10′51″W	1250976	Paddington British Rail Maintenance Depot, East Block
Paddington British Rail Maintenance Depot, West Block	City of Westminster	Boiler House	1966-8	14 April 1994	TQ2625081703; 51°31′13″N 0°10′54″W	1263004	Paddington British Rail Maintenance Depot, West Block More images
Palace Theatre	Soho, City of Westminster	Opera House	1888–1891	29 June 1960	TQ2987381012; 51°30′47″N 0°07′47″W	1066339	Palace Theatre More images
Palm House to Nuffield Lodge	Regent's Park, City of Westminster	Palm House	c. 1824	17 September 1981	TQ2725782921; 51°31′51″N 0°10′00″W	1227137	Upload Photo
Parkinson House	Lillington Gardens, Tachbrook Street, Pimlico, SW1	Flats	1967–1970	22 December 1998	TQ2951678498; 51°29′26″N 0°08′09″W	1246694	Parkinson House More images
Part of Aspinall Curzon	20 Curzon Street, Mayfair, W1	Terraced House	c1750-60	24 February 1958	TQ2847080211; 51°30′22″N 0°09′01″W	1356970	Part of Aspinall Curzon
Part of the Devonshire Club	5 Arlington Street, St James's	Terraced House	Early to mid 18th century	1 December 1987	TQ2912880334; 51°30′26″N 0°08′27″W	1357169	Part of the Devonshire Club
Peter Pan statue (west of Serpentine)	Kensington Gardens	Sculpture	1912	14 January 1970	TQ2668380431; 51°30′31″N 0°10′33″W	1217595	Peter Pan statue (west of Serpentine) More images
Piccadilly Hotel	21-31 and 31A Piccadilly, 1-5 Air Street and 65-81 Regent Street, W1	Hotel	1905–08	24 February 1958	TQ2941480598; 51°30′34″N 0°08′12″W	1265754	Piccadilly Hotel More images
Playground Railings to St James the Less Parish Rooms	City of Westminster	Children's Playground	1861	5 February 1970	TQ2958178486; 51°29′26″N 0°08′06″W	1066167	Playground Railings to St James the Less Parish Rooms
Premises of Messrs Liberty and Company Limited (Tudor building)	Soho, City of Westminster	Department Store	1922–1924	14 December 1972	TQ2915181082; 51°30′50″N 0°08′25″W	1357064	Premises of Messrs Liberty and Company Limited (Tudor building) More images
Presbytery of St Mary of the Angels Roman Catholic Church	Moorhouse Road, Westbourne Green W2	Priest's house	c. 1870	5 February 1970	TQ2515281208; 51°30′57″N 0°11′52″W	1223495	Presbytery of St Mary of the Angels Roman Catholic Church
Prince Alfred Public House	City of Westminster	Public house	1863	9 January 1970	TQ2602282174; 51°31′28″N 0°11′05″W	1066328	Prince Alfred Public House More images
Prototype K2 telephone kiosk to western side of entrance portal of Burlington House	City of Westminster	Telephone box		9 September 1986	TQ2924280481; 51°30′31″N 0°08′21″W	1265820	Prototype K2 telephone kiosk to western side of entrance portal of Burlington House More images
Queen Eleanor Memorial Cross	City of Westminster	Commemorative Monument	1864-5	5 February 1970	TQ3019780498; 51°30′30″N 0°07′31″W	1236708	Queen Eleanor Memorial Cross More images
Railings and Gate Piers to Number 49	Knightsbridge, City of Westminster	Gate Pier	Mid 19th century	9 January 1970	TQ2827679558; 51°30′01″N 0°09′12″W	1066461	Railings and Gate Piers to Number 49
Railings and Gatepiers Gates to Number 24	Knightsbridge, City of Westminster	Gate	c1840-50	9 January 1970	TQ2825379289; 51°29′53″N 0°09′14″W	1066458	Railings and Gatepiers Gates to Number 24
Railings Either Side of Tower Porch at Church of St James the Less	City of Westminster	Railings	c. 1861	5 February 1970	TQ2956878524; 51°29′27″N 0°08′06″W	1066165	Railings Either Side of Tower Porch at Church of St James the Less
Railings Gates and Gate Piers to Number 12	Knightsbridge, City of Westminster	Gate Pier	c1840-50	9 January 1970	TQ2814179421; 51°29′57″N 0°09′19″W	1218287	Railings Gates and Gate Piers to Number 12
Repton House	Lillington Gardens, Charlwood Street, Pimlico, SW1	Flats	1964–1968	22 December 1998	TQ2943578559; 51°29′28″N 0°08′13″W	1246692	Repton House More images
Richmond Terrace	City of Westminster	Terrace	1822-4	5 February 1970	TQ3022279877; 51°30′10″N 0°07′31″W	1235174	Richmond Terrace More images
Richmond Terrace Balustrade and 5 Lamps on It	City of Westminster	Balustrade	c1822-5	5 February 1970	TQ3022279898; 51°30′11″N 0°07′31″W	1265182	Richmond Terrace Balustrade and 5 Lamps on It
Roman Catholic Church of St. James (Spanish Place)	City of Westminster	Church	c1885-90	10 September 1954	TQ2828081539; 51°31′06″N 0°09′09″W	1066777	Roman Catholic Church of St. James (Spanish Place) More images
Royal Air Force Memorial	Whitehall Stairs, City of Westminster	War memorial	1923	23 March 2018	TQ3036480009; 51°30′14″N 0°07′23″W	1066171	Royal Air Force Memorial More images
Royal Artillery Boer War Memorial	The Mall, City of Westminster	cenotaph	1910	5 February 1970	TQ2981180158; 51°30′20″N 0°07′52″W	1273903	Royal Artillery Boer War Memorial More images
Roman Catholic Church of St Patricks	Soho Square, City of Westminster	Gate	1945	5 February 1970	TQ2976581268; 51°30′56″N 0°07′53″W	1236286	Roman Catholic Church of St Patricks More images
Royal Academy, including Burlington House and Galleries and Royal Academy Schools Buildings	City of Westminster	House	After 1660	5 February 1970	TQ2919780562; 51°30′33″N 0°08′23″W	1226676	Royal Academy, including Burlington House and Galleries and Royal Academy Schools Buildings More images
Royal Geographical Society	Kensington Gore, City of Westminster	Town House	1874-5	14 January 1970	TQ2675979634; 51°30′05″N 0°10′31″W	1217774	Royal Geographical Society More images
Royal Horticultural Society New Hall	City of Westminster	Steps	1923-8	24 May 1983	TQ2963378987; 51°29′42″N 0°08′02″W	1214142	Royal Horticultural Society New Hall More images
Royal Naval Division War Memorial	Horse Guards Parade	War memorial	1925	6 March 2008	TQ2994780150; 51°30′19″N 0°07′45″W	1392454	Royal Naval Division War Memorial More images
Royal United Services Institute	City of Westminster	Institute	1893–95	5 February 1970	TQ3017380040; 51°30′16″N 0°07′33″W	1266924	Royal United Services Institute More images
Russian Orthodox Patriarchial Church of the Assumption of All Saints	Ennismore Gardens, City of Westminster	Church	1848-9	24 February 1958	TQ2718279554; 51°30′02″N 0°10′09″W	1066842	Russian Orthodox Patriarchial Church of the Assumption of All Saints More images
Sanderson Hotel (formerly Sanderson House)	City of Westminster	Commercial Office	1958	23 January 1991	TQ2933281512; 51°31′04″N 0°08′15″W	1248457	Sanderson Hotel (formerly Sanderson House) More images
Savoy Chapel (the Queen's Chapel of the Savoy)	City of Westminster	Royal Chapel	1510–16	24 February 1958	TQ3056880743; 51°30′38″N 0°07′12″W	1264731	Savoy Chapel (the Queen's Chapel of the Savoy) More images
Savoy Theatre	City of Westminster	Theatre	1881	23 October 1973	TQ3050080696; 51°30′36″N 0°07′15″W	1236724	Savoy Theatre More images
Schomberg House	St James's, City of Westminster	Town House	1698	5 February 1970	TQ2948480180; 51°30′21″N 0°08′09″W	1225814	Schomberg House More images
Seaford House and railings and gate piers	Knightsbridge, City of Westminster	Town House	1842	9 January 1970	TQ2841479427; 51°29′57″N 0°09′05″W	1066459	Seaford House and railings and gate piers More images
Selfridges, Oxford Street	Marylebone, City of Westminster	Department Store	1928	5 February 1970	TQ2827981111; 51°30′52″N 0°09′10″W	1357436	Selfridges, Oxford Street More images
Shelter Alcove (opposite the North End of the Serpentine)	City of Westminster	Park Shelter	Early 18th century	14 January 1970	TQ2672480736; 51°30′41″N 0°10′31″W	1217602	Shelter Alcove (opposite the North End of the Serpentine) More images
Simpsons	City of Westminster	Department Store	1935-6	14 September 1970	TQ2945680539; 51°30′32″N 0°08′10″W	1226639	Simpsons More images
Snowdon Aviary London Zoo	City of Westminster	Aviary	1962–1965	12 June 1998	TQ2788683562; 51°32′11″N 0°09′27″W	1323695	Snowdon Aviary London Zoo More images
South Africa House	City of Westminster	Embassy	1933	9 March 1982	TQ3009580479; 51°30′30″N 0°07′37″W	1066238	South Africa House More images
The Lanesborough (formerly St George's Hospital) attached drinking fountain	City of Westminster	Gate	C20	14 January 1970	TQ2831479787; 51°30′09″N 0°09′10″W	1277491	The Lanesborough (formerly St George's Hospital) attached drinking fountain More images
St John's Lodge	Regent's Park, City of Westminster	Villa	1818–19	5 February 1970	TQ2822282794; 51°31′46″N 0°09′11″W	1277478	St John's Lodge More images
St Martin in the Fields Secondary School	City of Westminster	National School	1827–30	24 February 1958t	TQ3013180577; 51°30′33″N 0°07′35″W	1236019	St Martin in the Fields Secondary School More images
St Martin's Vestry Hall	City of Westminster	Town Hall	c1827-30	24 February 1958	TQ3011280577; 51°30′33″N 0°07′36″W	1264790	St Martin's Vestry Hall More images
St Martin's Vicarage	City of Westminster	Terraced House	c1827-30	5 February 1970	TQ3009780579; 51°30′33″N 0°07′36″W	1264791	St Martin's Vicarage
Statue of Field Marshall Earl Haig	Whitehall, City of Westminster	Statue	1936	5 February 1970	TQ3014380035; 51°30′15″N 0°07′35″W	1066109	Statue of Field Marshall Earl Haig More images
Stourhead House and Pride of Pimlico Public House Stourhead House, with Garden Walls and Pride of Pimlico Public House	City of Westminster	Flats	1967–1970	22 December 1998	TQ2954878428; 51°29′24″N 0°08′08″W	1246697	Stourhead House and Pride of Pimlico Public House Stourhead House, with Garden Walls and Pride of Pimlico Public House More images
Tate Gallery	City of Westminster	Art Gallery	1897	5 February 1970	TQ3007178570; 51°29′28″N 0°07′40″W	1222913	Tate Gallery More images
The Argyll Arms Public House	Soho, City of Westminster	Public House	c1870-80	9 January 1970	TQ2906481208; 51°30′54″N 0°08′29″W	1066496	The Argyll Arms Public House More images
The Cavalry Club	Piccadilly, City of Westminster	Town House	1888	3 July 1969	TQ2861880003; 51°30′16″N 0°08′54″W	1226813	The Cavalry Club More images
Millbank House (formerly The Church Commissioners)	City of Westminster	Office	1903	5 February 1970	TQ3017679257; 51°29′50″N 0°07′34″W	1267603	Millbank House (formerly The Church Commissioners) More images
The Coliseum Theatre (English National Opera)	City of Westminster	Theatre	1990	20 September 1960	TQ3013180671; 51°30′36″N 0°07′34″W	1236022	The Coliseum Theatre (English National Opera) More images
The Economist Group (including Office Tower, Residential Block, Former Bank and Podium)	City of Westminster	Commercial Office	Mid 20th century	13 June 1988	51°30′25″N 0°08′20″W	1264050	The Economist Group (including Office Tower, Residential Block, Former Bank and Podium) More images
The Garrick Club	Covent Garden, City of Westminster	Gentlemen's Club	c. 1860	14 January 1970	TQ3011780834; 51°30′41″N 0°07′35″W	1066808	The Garrick Club More images
The Garrick Theatre	City of Westminster	Theatre	1889	20 September 1960	TQ3001680673; 51°30′36″N 0°07′40″W	1217927	The Garrick Theatre More images
The Grosvenor Chapel	City of Westminster	Chapel of Ease	1729–30	24 February 1958	TQ2839780520; 51°30′33″N 0°09′04″W	1236429	The Grosvenor Chapel More images
The Holme	Regent's Park, City of Westminster	Villa	c. 1819	5 February 1970	TQ2797882566; 51°31′39″N 0°09′24″W	1231804	The Holme More images
The Law Society	City of Westminster	Legal Office	1831	9 January 1970	TQ3112181245; 51°30′54″N 0°06′42″W	1292263	The Law Society More images
The Learned Societies, Forecourt Buildings to Burlington House	City of Westminster	Porters Lodge	1867–73	5 February 1970	TQ2924380488; 51°30′31″N 0°08′21″W	1389279	The Learned Societies, Forecourt Buildings to Burlington House More images
The London Palladium Theatre	Soho, City of Westminster	Theatre	1910	28 June 1972	TQ2915281154; 51°30′52″N 0°08′25″W	1210130	The London Palladium Theatre More images
The Magazine	City of Westminster	Magazine	1804	14 January 1970	TQ2700980263; 51°30′25″N 0°10′17″W	1278154	The Magazine More images
National Liberal Club	City of Westminster	Mansion Flats	1884–1887	5 February 1970	TQ3030080242; 51°30′22″N 0°07′26″W	1066072	National Liberal Club More images
The Old Curiosity Shop	Holborn, City of Westminster	House	Early 19th century	24 February 1958	TQ3073381243; 51°30′54″N 0°07′02″W	1227133	The Old Curiosity Shop More images
The Pavilion at Lord's Cricket Ground	City of Westminster	Cricket Pavilion	1889–90	3 September 1982	TQ2676782693; 51°31′44″N 0°10′26″W	1235992	The Pavilion at Lord's Cricket Ground More images
The Ritz Hotel	City of Westminster	Grand hotel	1906	10 March 1965	TQ2907280320; 51°30′25″N 0°08′30″W	1226499	The Ritz Hotel More images
The Royal Automobile Club	St James's, City of Westminster	Gentlemen's club	1908–11	5 February 1970	TQ2952080203; 51°30′21″N 0°08′07″W	1065860	The Royal Automobile Club More images
The Royal College of Surgeons	Holborn, City of Westminster	Professional institute	1806–1813	24 February 1958	TQ3083881278; 51°30′55″N 0°06′57″W	1222011	The Royal College of Surgeons More images
The Royal Institute of British Architects	City of Westminster	Institute	1932-4	14 September 1970	TQ2879381885; 51°31′16″N 0°08′42″W	1227026	The Royal Institute of British Architects More images
The Savile Club	Mayfair, City of Westminster	House	Mid 19th century	24 February 1958	TQ2853180896; 51°30′45″N 0°08′57″W	1219938	The Savile Club More images
The Tottenham Public House	City of Westminster	Public House	1892	1 December 1987	TQ2979481394; 51°31′00″N 0°07′51″W	1357394	The Tottenham Public House More images
Time and Life Building	City of Westminster	Commercial Office	Mid 20th century	29 March 1988	TQ2893780732; 51°30′39″N 0°08′36″W	1264063	Time and Life Building More images
Tower of St Anne's Church, Soho	Soho, City of Westminster	Church	1801–1803	24 February 1958	TQ2970180923; 51°30′44″N 0°07′56″W	1357340	Tower of St Anne's Church, Soho More images
Ukrainian Catholic Cathedral of the Holy Family in Exile	City of Westminster	Roman Catholic Cathedral	1987	14 January 1970	TQ2842581013; 51°30′48″N 0°09′02″W	1210923	Ukrainian Catholic Cathedral of the Holy Family in Exile More images
Uxbridge House	St James, City of Westminster	Town House	1721–23	24 February 1958	TQ2916380675; 51°30′37″N 0°08′25″W	1357241	Uxbridge House More images
Vauxhall Bridge	City of Westminster	Sculpture	1904–06	26 November 2008	TQ3008878212; 51°29′16″N 0°07′40″W	1393011	Vauxhall Bridge More images
Victoria Palace Theatre	City of Westminster	Theatre	1911	23 June 1972	TQ2903679181; 51°29′49″N 0°08′33″W	1238140	Victoria Palace Theatre More images
War Office	City of Westminster	Government Office	1898	5 February 1970	TQ3016280156; 51°30′19″N 0°07′33″W	1224143	War Office More images
Waterloo Bridge	City of Westminster	Road Bridge	1939–1945	16 January 1981	TQ3077080549; 51°30′31″N 0°07′01″W	1275000	Waterloo Bridge More images
Wentworth House	5 St James's Square, St James's SW1	Terraced town mansion	1748–1749	24 February 1958	TQ2952180446; 51°30′29″N 0°08′06″W	1264938	Wentworth House More images
Westminster College (1950s Building)	City of Westminster	Technical College	1937	24 April 1998	TQ2953878968; 51°29′41″N 0°08′07″W	1119723	Westminster College (1950s Building) More images
Whitehall Court	City of Westminster	Mansion Flats	1884	5 February 1970	TQ3028980163; 51°30′19″N 0°07′27″W	1266894	Whitehall Court More images
Wimbourne House	St James, City of Westminster	Town House	c1740-55	24 February 1958	TQ2906280281; 51°30′24″N 0°08′30″W	1066498	Wimbourne House More images
Wyndham's Theatre	City of Westminster	Theatre	1899	20 September 1960	TQ3000080792; 51°30′40″N 0°07′41″W	1292230	Wyndham's Theatre More images
Zimbabwe House	City of Westminster	Embassy	Later	5 February 1970	TQ3028080640; 51°30′35″N 0°07′27″W	1237039	Zimbabwe House More images

== See also ==
- Grade I listed buildings in the City of Westminster
