= The Flying Horse =

Listed pub in Fitzrovia, London, England

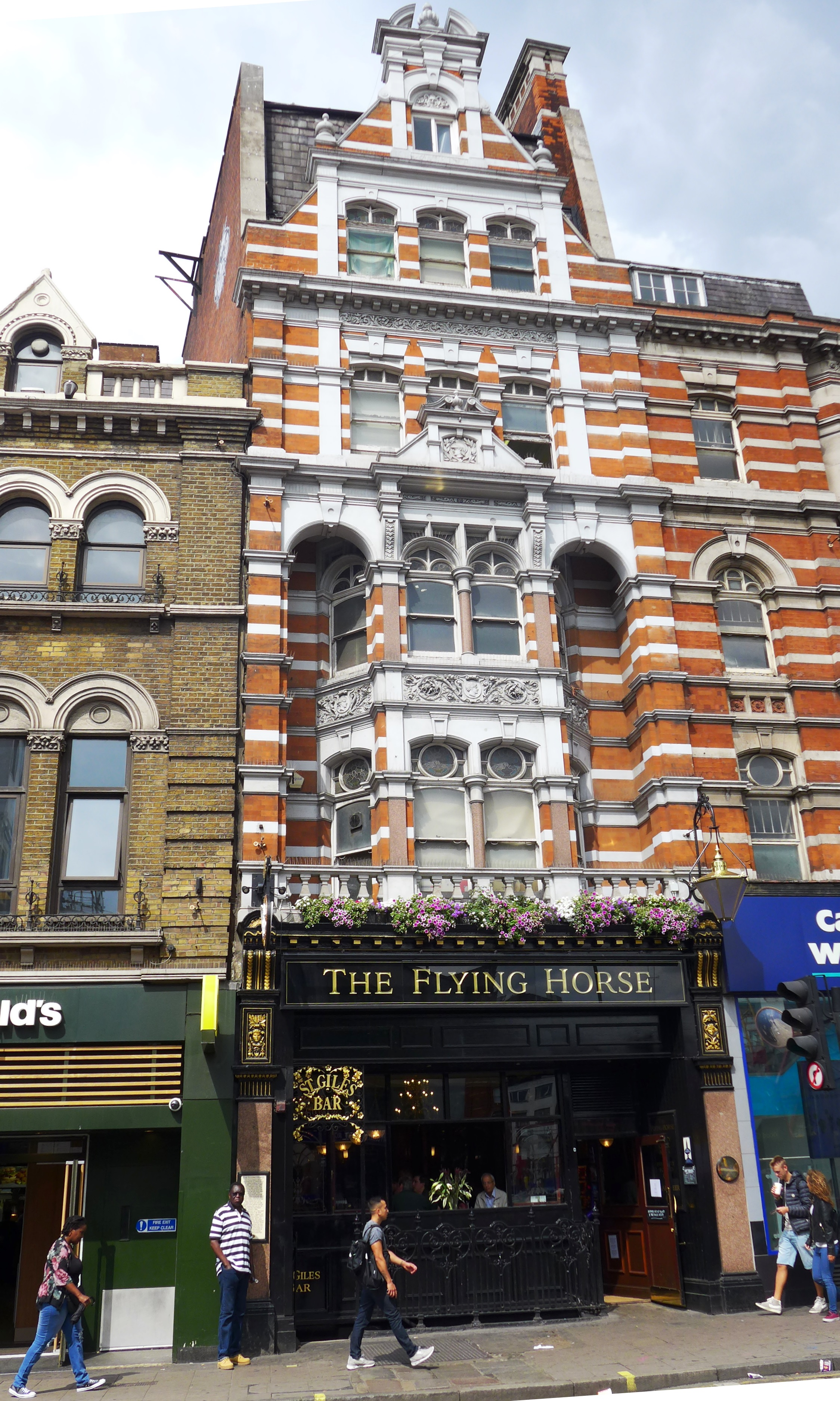
- The pub in 2015

- Location within Central London
- Former names: The Tottenham

General information
- Type: Public house
- Architectural style: Flemish Renaissance
- Location: 6 Oxford Street, Fitzrovia, London, England
- Coordinates: 51.516565°N 0.130808°W
- Year built: 1892; 134 years ago
- Client: Baker Bros.
- Owner: Jelen Investment Ltd

Design and construction
- Architect: Saville and Martin
- Designations

Listed Building – Grade II*
- Official name: Flying Horse public house
- Designated: 1 December 1987
- Reference no.: 1322190

Website
- Official website

The Flying Horse is a Grade II* listed public house on Oxford Street in Fitzrovia, London, England. Built in 1892 to designs by Saville and Martin for Baker Bros. on the site of an earlier pub, it is the last remaining pub on Oxford Street. Known as The Tottenham for more than a century, it reverted to its earlier name in 2015. The pub is noted for its Flemish Renaissance architecture and well-preserved late Victorian interior, which is included in the Campaign for Real Ale (CAMRA)'s National Inventory of Historic Pub Interiors and is regarded as being of "outstanding national historic importance".

== History ==
The present Flying Horse was built in 1892 on the site of an earlier public house for Baker Bros. to designs by Saville and Martin, as part of the redevelopment of the corner of Oxford Street and Tottenham Court Road. One of the brothers' earliest ventures, it was managed by William Henry and Richard Baker between 1892 and 1897, with their offices in the adjoining building. The Flying Horse is the last remaining pub on Oxford Street and is regarded as the best-preserved survivor of the Baker brothers' public house developments.

On 1 December 1987, the building was listed at Grade II; its designation was upgraded to Grade II* on 27 October 2009 in recognition of its well-preserved late Victorian interior, notable decorative scheme, distinctive Flemish Renaissance exterior, and its association with the Baker brothers' public house developments.

It was included on the Campaign for Real Ale (CAMRA)'s National Inventory of Historic Pub Interiors before the inventory's grading system was revised. Under the revised scheme, it is rated three stars and its interior is regarded as being "of outstanding national historic importance".

Writing under the pseudonym Robert Galbraith, J. K. Rowling featured the pub in her 2013 novel The Cuckoo's Calling. Known for more than a century as The Tottenham, it was renamed The Flying Horse in 2015, restoring the pub's name before its redevelopment.

As of July 2026 the pub was operated by Mitchells & Butlers under their Nicholson's brand and the freehold was owned by Jelen Investment Ltd.

== Architecture ==
=== Exterior ===
The building is constructed of red brick with stone detailing and has a narrow frontage rising to four storeys, with an additional two-storey gable above. A steep slate roof sits behind the front elevation. The windows are timber sashes, some incorporating coloured glass in their upper sections. Although the ground-floor pub frontage has been replaced, the pink granite corner supports with decorative detailing survive, and the upper part of the building remains largely unchanged. The first and second floors are distinguished by decorative recesses on either side of a projecting central window feature, which has pink granite detailing and rises into a gable at the level above. The third and fourth floors each contain three windows, while the shaped gable at the top of the building is crowned by an ornamental feature at its apex.

=== Interior ===
The interior in 2015

The interior survives largely intact and retains a range of decorative features dating from the late Victorian period. Dark wood panelling lines the walls, while a large fireplace, a tiled frieze, moulded cornices and a decorative ceiling incorporating a skylight form part of the scheme of interior decoration. Decorative wall panels include back-painted mirrors by Jones and Firmin, tile panels depicting flowering urns by Millington, Wisdom and Co., and painted representations of the Four Seasons by Felix de Jong and Co., three of which survive. The ceiling also contains painted roundels depicting scenes from Classical mythology.

== See also ==
- Grade II* listed buildings in the City of Westminster (A–Z)
- List of pubs in London
