= Civil Service Rifles War Memorial =

War memorial in Somerset House, London

- United Kingdom
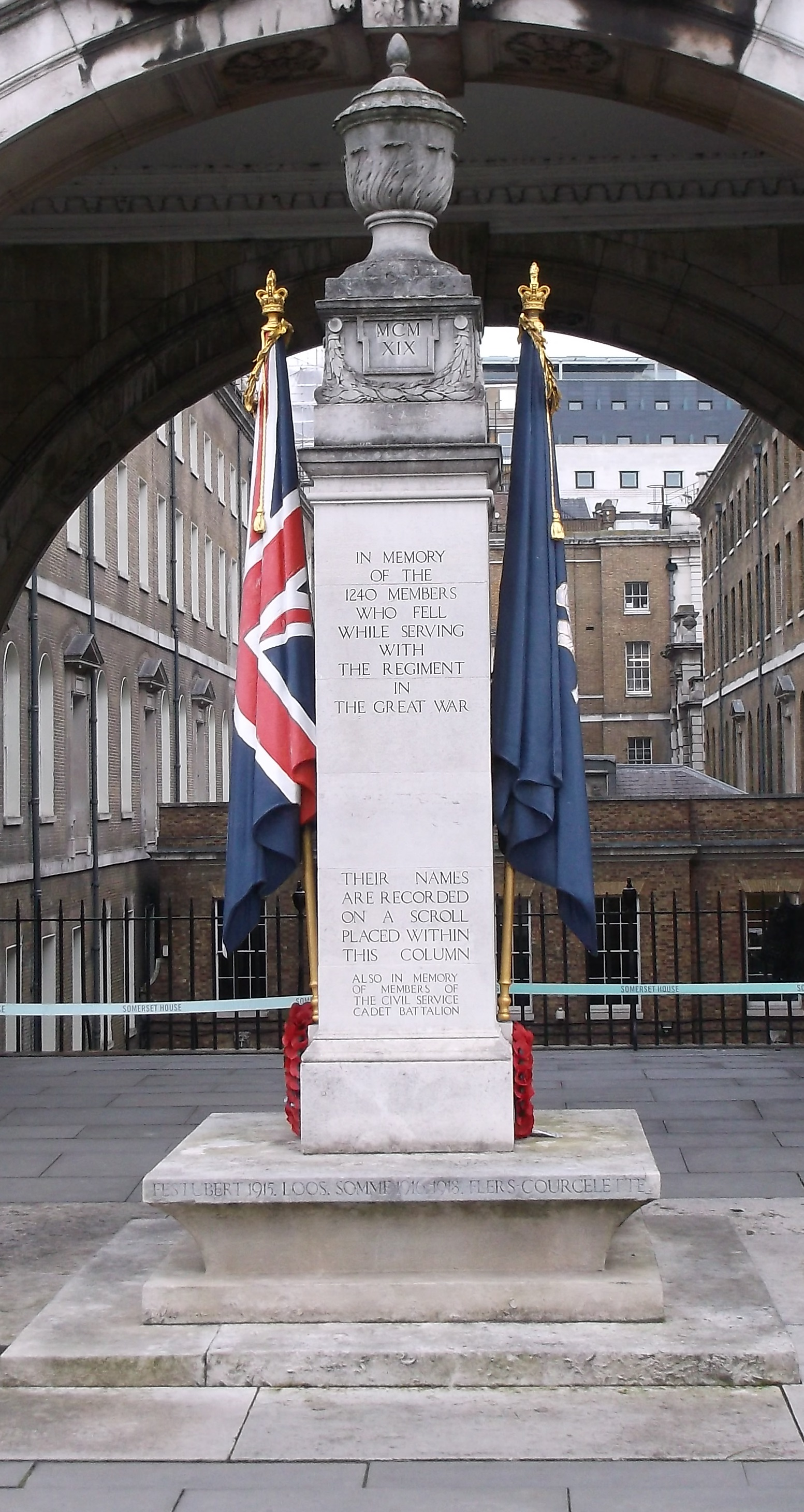
- For members of the Prince of Wales' Own Civil Service Rifles killed in the First World War
- Unveiled: 27 January 1924
- Location: 51°30′37″N 0°07′03″W; Riverside terrace, Somerset House, London
- Designed by: Sir Edwin Lutyens

Listed Building – Grade II*
- Official name: The Civil Service Rifles War Memorial
- Designated: 1 December 1987
- Reference no.: 1237096

The Civil Service Rifles War Memorial is a First World War memorial located on the riverside terrace at Somerset House in central London, England. Designed by Sir Edwin Lutyens and unveiled in 1924, the memorial commemorates the 1,240 members of the Prince of Wales' Own Civil Service Rifles regiment who were killed in the First World War. They were Territorial Force reservists, drawn largely from the British Civil Service, which at that time had many staff based at Somerset House.

Both battalions of the expanded Civil Service Rifles were disbanded shortly after the war; the regiment amalgamated with the Queen's Westminster Rifles, but former members established an Old Comrades Association to keep the regiment's traditions alive. The association began raising funds for a war memorial in 1920, and the Prince of Wales unveiled the memorial on 27 January 1924. It takes the form of a single rectangular column surmounted by a sculpture of an urn and flanked by painted stone flags, the Union Flag on one side and the regimental colour on the other. The base on which the column stands is inscribed with the regiment's battle honours, while an inscription on the column denotes that a scroll containing the names of the fallen was placed inside.

The memorial first stood in the quadrangle of Somerset House, which the Civil Service Rifles had used as a parade ground, but the civil service began to vacate Somerset House towards the end of the 20th century. As the building and its courtyard were re-purposed, the memorial was moved to the riverside terrace in the late 1990s. Members of the regiment continued to attend Remembrance Sunday ceremonies until at least the late 1980s, by which time many former members were in their nineties; the last known surviving member of the regiment attended a rededication ceremony in 2002. The memorial was designated a grade II listed building in 1987, which was upgraded to grade II* in November 2015 when it became part of a national collection of Lutyens's war memorials.

== Background ==
In the aftermath of the First World War and its unprecedented casualties, thousands of war memorials were built across Britain. Amongst the most prominent designers of memorials was Sir Edwin Lutyens, described by Historic England as "the leading English architect of his generation". Lutyens established his reputation designing country houses for wealthy clients, but the war had a profound effect on him, and following it he devoted much of his time to memorialising its casualties. He became a public figure through his design for the Cenotaph on Whitehall, which became Britain's national war memorial. This, along with his work for the Imperial War Graves Commission, led to commissions for war memorials across Britain and the empire. As well as memorials for towns and cities, Lutyens was commissioned to design memorials for several private companies and regimental associations, including the Civil Service Rifles. These were among the least controversial of Lutyens's war memorials, as sites and funds tended to be readily available.

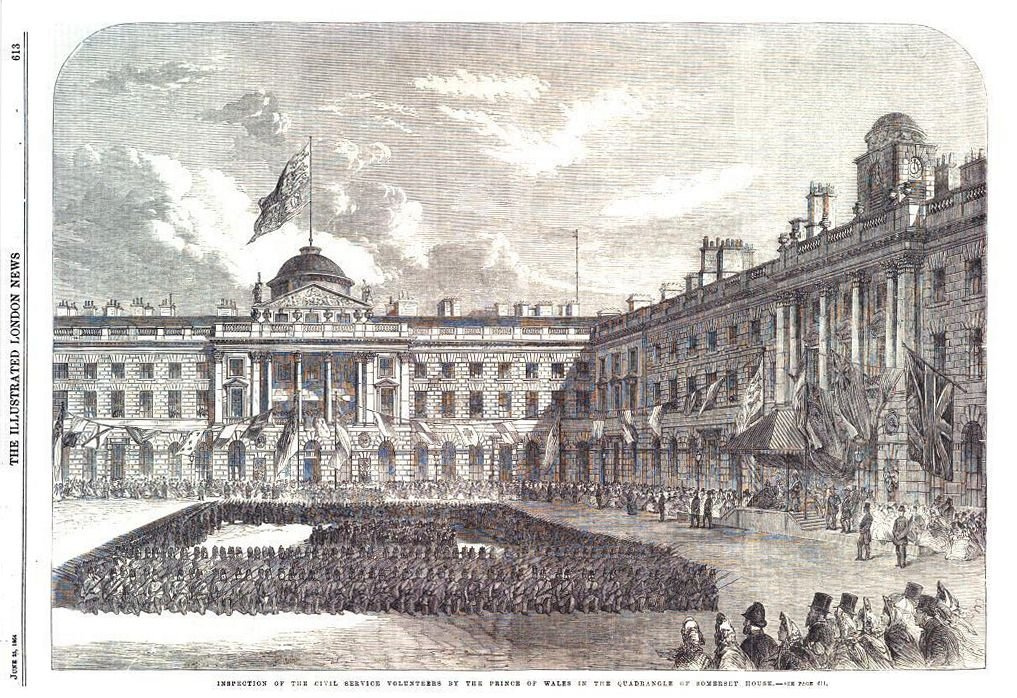
The regiment being inspected by Edward, Prince of Wales, in the quadrangle at Somerset House, 1864

The Civil Service Rifles—properly named the "15th (County of London) Battalion, the London Regiment (the Prince of Wales' Own Civil Service Rifles)"—was a unit in the Territorial Force, a part-time reserve element of the British Army. The regiment's members were drawn from the Civil Service, the permanent administrative apparatus of the British government. Many civil servants were based at Somerset House, an important government office building, and the regiment used its quadrangle as a parade ground.

Forming part of the 4th London Brigade, in the 2nd London Division, the soldiers were at their annual camp on Salisbury Plain when Britain declared war on Germany on 4 August 1914. The battalion was mobilised the same day and sent for training in Hertfordshire, before being deployed to the Western Front in 1915. It arrived at Le Havre on 18 March and came under the command of the 140th (4th London) Brigade, part of the 47th (London) Division. It was in action at the Battle of Loos in 1915, the Battle of the Somme in 1916, and the Battle of Passchendaele in 1917, and during the Hundred Days Offensive in 1918. A second battalion was raised and served in France, then Salonika and Palestine. Both battalions were disbanded after the war, having lost 1,240 officers and men out of approximately 7,000 who served overseas with the regiment.

== Commissioning ==
After the war, the demobilised soldiers formed an Old Comrades Association, and discussion turned to commemorating the regiment's dead. The association formed a War Memorial Committee, chaired by Major W. H. Kirby, and established an appeal to raise £750 for the construction of a memorial. The funds were raised largely from donations from former members of the regiment, aided by the proceeds from sales of a regimental history.

The committee first commissioned the architect Herbert Baker to produce a design, which was approved by the Office of Works in June 1919. Baker proposed to site the memorial in the north end of the quadrangle at Somerset House, behind the statue of King George III. Some time after the approval, the committee replaced Baker with Sir Edwin Lutyens, who was adamant that the memorial should stand in the centre of the quadrangle. To this the Office of Works objected, concerned about the effect a memorial in such a prominent location would have on the surrounding 18th-century architecture. The office eventually relented after Lutyens examined Sir William Chambers's original plans and argued that Chambers had intended to place a central object in the quadrangle.

== Design ==
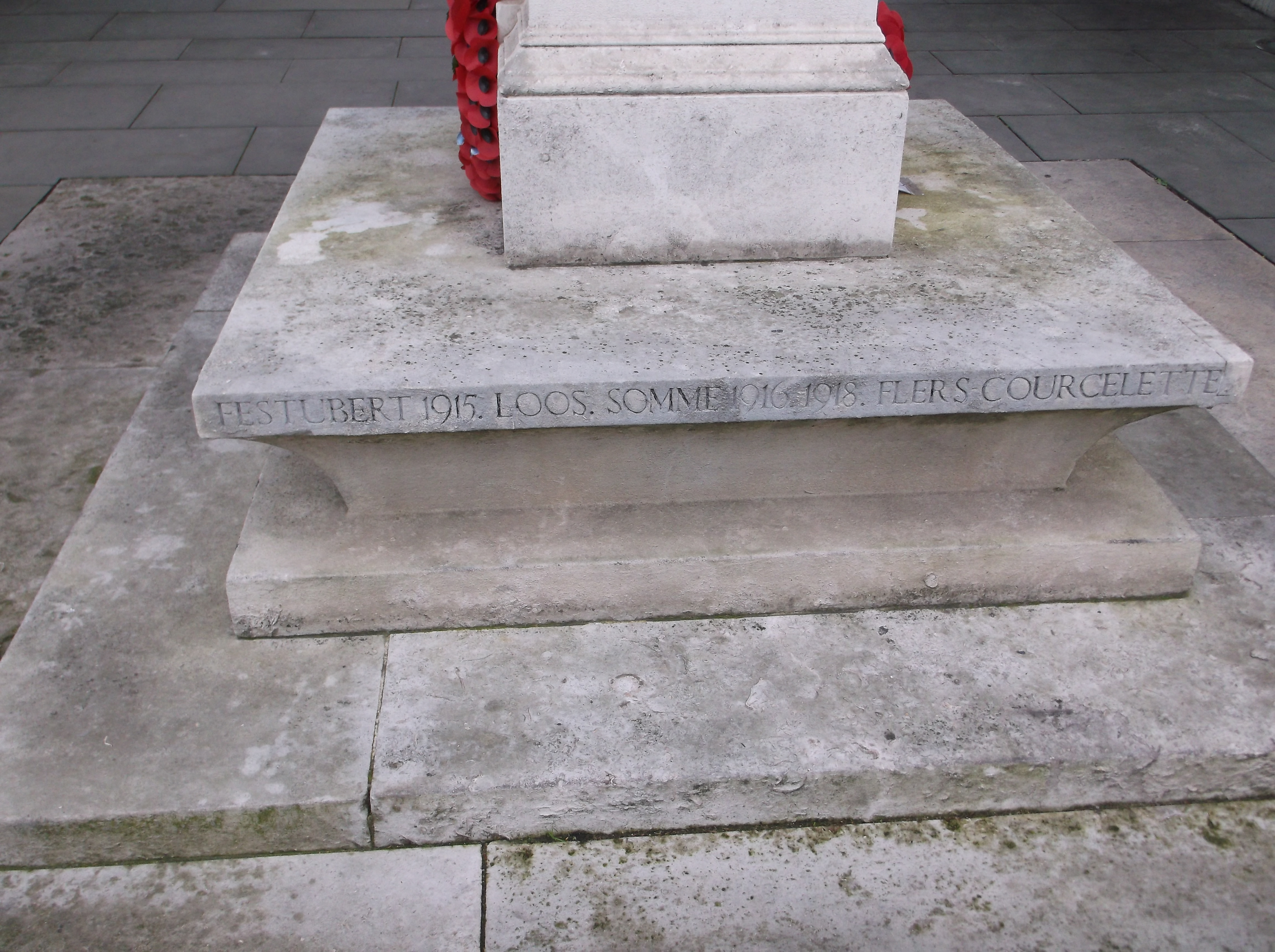
The decorative plinth, showing some of the regiment's battle honours

The memorial is in the form of a single rectangular column of Portland stone, which is decorated with classical mouldings and stands approximately 4.9 metres (16 feet) tall. At the top is a shallow cornice, on which stands a plinth supporting a sculpture of an urn at the very top. The plinth is decorated with laurel swags. The column itself stands on a square, coved base which in turn rests on a platform of two square steps. Painted stone flags hang from either side of the column—the regiment's colours on the east side (the right, when viewed from the front) and the Union Flag on the west (left). The flags were originally copper but were later replaced with carved stone. No names are listed on the memorial, but a scroll containing the names of the regiment's dead from the First World War was placed inside the column. Lutyens intended his design to be harmonious with the surrounding stone architecture of Somerset House, though the polychromy of the flags stood out. Painted stone flags are a recurring feature in Lutyens's war memorial designs; he first proposed them for the Cenotaph, where they were rejected in favour of fabric, though they feature on several of his other designs.

On the front (north) face is inscribed the dedication THIS COLUMN WAS ERECTED BY THE 15TH COUNTY OF LONDON BATTALION THE LONDON REGIMENT PRINCE OF WALES OWN CIVIL SERVICE RIFLES, while the south face reads: IN MEMORY OF THE 1240 MEMBERS WHO FELL WHILE SERVING WITH THE REGIMENT IN THE GREAT WAR THEIR NAMES ARE RECORDED ON A SCROLL PLACED WITHIN THIS COLUMN / ALSO IN MEMORY OF MEMBERS OF THE CIVIL SERVICE CADET BATTALION. The start and end dates of the war are inscribed in Roman numerals below the urn, "MCMXIV" on the north side and "MCMXIX" on the south, denoting the war's official end with the Treaty of Versailles. The regiment's battle honours are inscribed around the base: Festubert, Loos, Somme, and Flers–Courcelette on the south side; Doiran, Lys/Kemmel, Gaza, Nebi Samwil, and Jerusalem on the west; St Quentin, Albert, Ancre, Bapaume, and Selle on the north; and Transloy, Messines, Ypres, and Cambrai on the east face.

== History ==
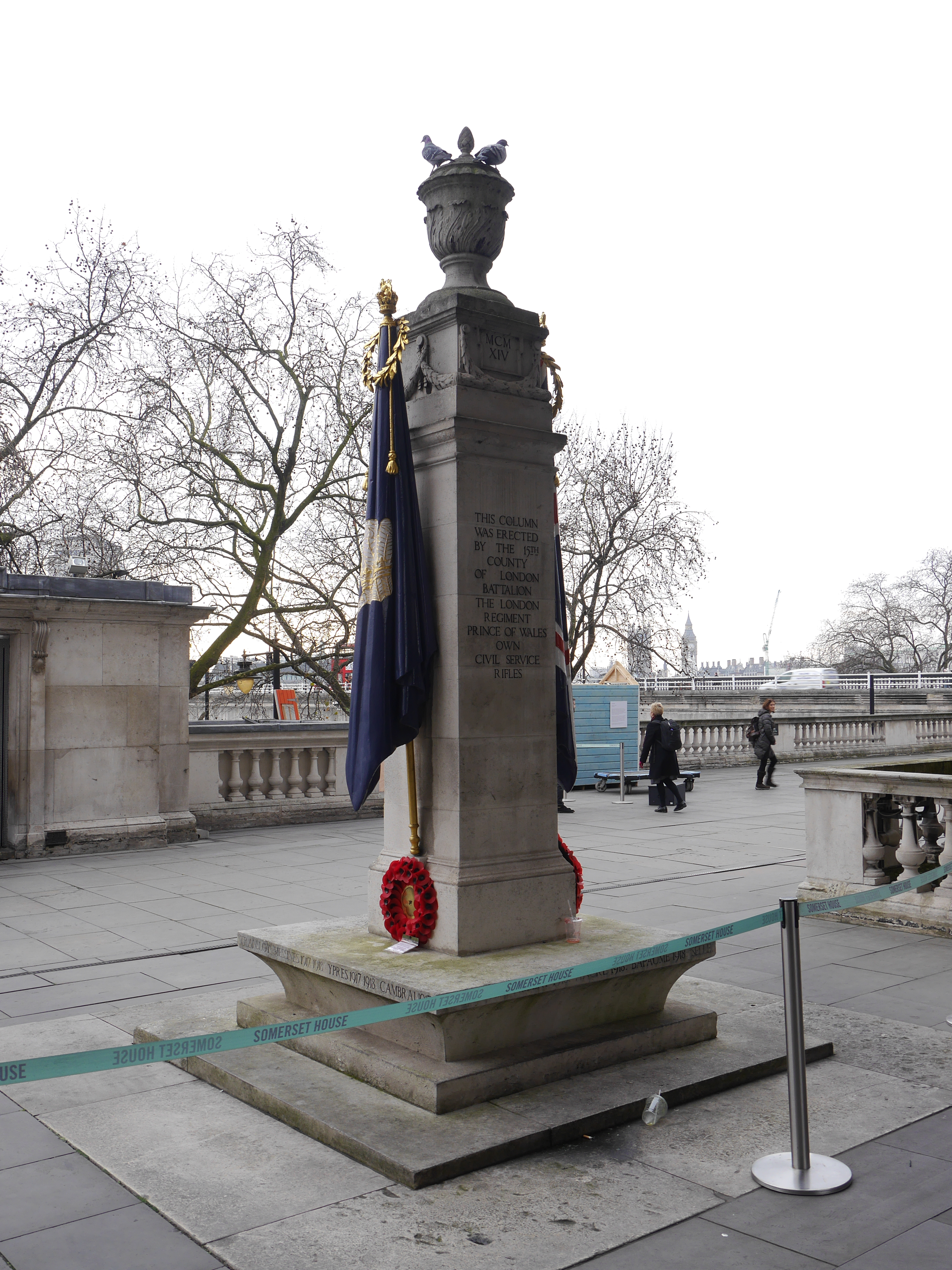
The memorial in its new location on the riverside terrace, showing the rear inscription and the sculpted regimental colour

The memorial was made at Nine Elms Stone Masonry Works in Battersea, south London. It was unveiled by the regiment's honorary colonel, Edward, Prince of Wales (wearing the uniform of a colonel in the Welsh Guards) and dedicated by the Reverend E. H. Beattie, the 1st Battalion's chaplain, at a ceremony on 27 January 1924. Music was provided by the regimental band and the choir of the nearby church of St Clement Danes. The Last Post and the Reveille were sounded and the crowd sang the national anthem, "God Save the King". Among others present was the Suffragan Bishop of Willesden, William Perrin, as well as several senior army officers, former members of the regiment, their families, and relatives of deceased members. By the time of the ceremony, post-war reorganisations had reduced the Civil Service Rifles in size to two companies and amalgamated it with the Queen's Westminster Rifles to form the 16th Battalion, the London Regiment (Queen's Westminster and Civil Service Rifles), though veterans were determined to maintain the traditions of the old regiment. Members of the Civil Service companies of the successor regiment formed a guard of honour during the ceremony. Prior to the memorial's unveiling, HM Treasury authorised the Office of Works to take responsibility for its maintenance.

The lines in the inscription relating to the cadet battalion were added in 1926 after Major Kirby wrote to the Office of Works seeking permission. The memorial suffered damage from German bombing during the Second World War and underwent repair and restoration work in the 1950s. As former members began to die, some due to wartime injuries, a tradition emerged of a widow laying the first wreath at the annual ceremony on Remembrance Sunday (the closest Sunday to 11 November). Surviving members continued to meet at the war memorial until the late 1980s, by which time the attendees were in their nineties.

By the early 1980s, few civil servants remained at Somerset House and the government was leasing parts of the building for other uses. When the matter was raised in the House of Lords, Lord Houghton of Sowerby—a former member of the regiment—enquired as to the government's plans for the war memorial. Lord Skelmersdale replied on behalf of the government: "This regiment had a distinguished record of service during the Great War and it is entirely fitting that the memorial should be situated in the courtyard of the first purpose-built government office building. I can assure the house there has been no thought of moving it, nor will there be". Nonetheless, the memorial was moved in the late 1990s, when the courtyard was redeveloped to provide a public exhibition space. It underwent restoration work, including repainting of the flags, before being reinstalled in front of the Navy Treasurer's door on the Embankment side of Somerset House, on a terrace beside the River Thames. The Royal Green Jackets (the successor regiment resulting from further amalgamations following the Second World War and subsequent restructuring of the army) organised a rededication ceremony, which was held on 25 July 2002 and was overseen by Richard Chartres, the Bishop of London. The chairman of the board of the Inland Revenue, which was based at Somerset House and whose officials were among the founding members of the Civil Service Rifles, laid a wreath. Among those present were relatives of former members, and Walter Humphrys, the last known surviving veteran of the regiment from the First World War.

The memorial was designated a grade II listed building in 1987. Listed status provides legal protection from demolition or modification; grade II is applied to about 92% of listed buildings of "special interest, warranting every effort to preserve them". It was upgraded to grade II* (reserved for "particularly important buildings of more than special interest" and applied to about 5.5% of listings) in November 2015, when Historic England deemed Lutyens's war memorials a national collection as part of commemorations for the centenary of the First World War.

== See also ==
- Grade II* listed buildings in the City of Westminster (A–Z)
- Grade II* listed war memorials in England
