= Argyll House =

Historic property in London

Coordinates: 51.515°N 0.141°W

Argyll House in 1854.

Argyll House was a historic residence in London just south of Oxford Street on the present-day Argyll Street. It was originally the London townhouse of the Dukes of Argyll, a prominent Scottish family, before later passing into the hands of the nineteenth century politician Lord Aberdeen after considerable redevelopment. Aberdeen died at Argyll House in 1860, and the house was demolished a few years later.

== Argyll family ==
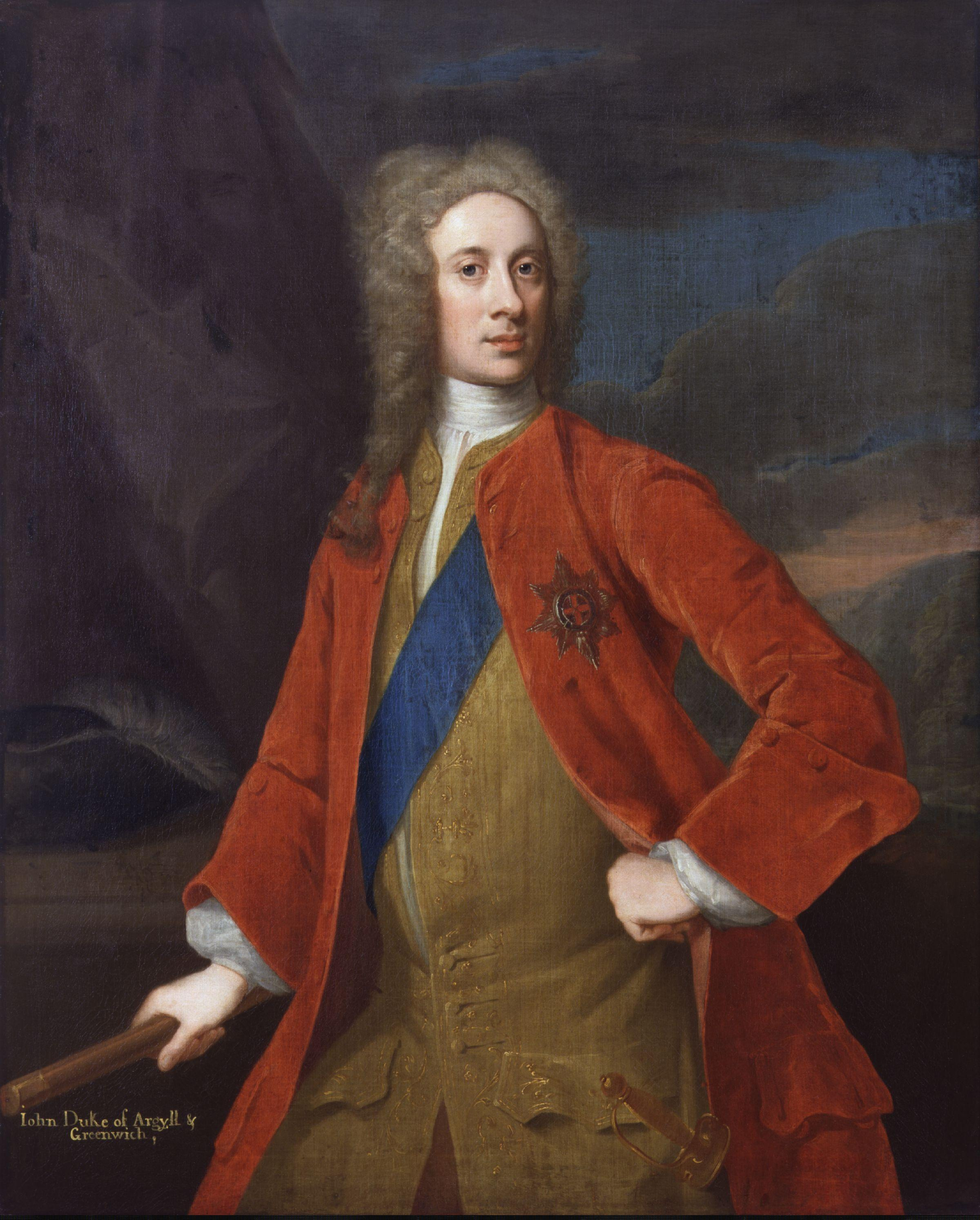
Portrait of the Duke of Argyll by William Aikman. In 1706 the soldier and politician the Duke of Argyll acquired a property in the area beginning his family's connection with the location. His younger brother Archibald built Argyll House nearby.

John Campbell, 2nd Duke of Argyll, known for his role in the Act of Union and the 1715 Jacobite Rising, acquired a property in 1706 and used it as his London residence along with Sudbrook Park to the west of the capital in Surrey. He expanded his landholding before later turning it over for development into a series of houses on the new Argyll Street and the adjoining Little Argyll Street. His younger brother Archibald built his own residence nearby, that subsequently became known as Argyll House. The designer of the house is unknown but James Gibbs, who helped on the development of the nearby Argyll Street for the family, may have assisted with the exterior of the building. Archibald succeeded his brother and inherited the properties as third Duke in 1743. It passed on to through subsequent dukes. The writer Lady Charlotte Bury, daughter of John Campbell, 5th Duke of Argyll, was born there in 1775. Harriette Wilson, the mistress of the Sixth Duke, described it as a "dismal chateau".

== Aberdeen residence ==
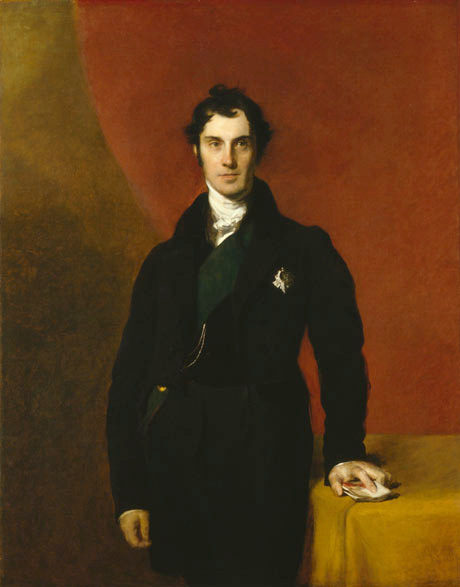
Portrait of Lord Aberdeen by Thomas Lawrence, 1830. Argyll House was the residence of Foreign Secretary and Prime Minister Lord Aberdeen for many years.

It was acquired in 1808 by George Hamilton-Gordon, 4th Earl of Aberdeen who made it his London residence for the rest of his life. Aberdeen commissioned the architect William Wilkins to rebuild the house at considerable expense in the fashionable Greek Revival style. The reconstruction took some time and it was not until 1811 it was fully finished. In 1814, during the Allied sovereigns' visit to England, the Austrian foreign minister Klemens von Metternich based himself there at the invitation of Aberdeen who had recently served as British Ambassador to Austria. The Duke of Wellington was interested in buying the house, but ultimately acquired Apsley House instead. While much of the nearby area was dramatically altered by the construction of Regent Street in the 1820s, Argyll House was not redeveloped.

It was an important political location and during Aberdeen's service as Foreign Secretary in Wellington's government the cabinet met there. When he himself became Prime Minister in 1852, Aberdeen's own cabinet had their first meeting over dinner at the property. Aberdeen died at Argyll House in 1860, and the house was demolished a few years after. Some of the site was taken over by the West End theatre the London Palladium. Further north up Argyll Street, adjacent to the present-day Oxford Circus tube station, is a pub called the Argyll Arms which commemorates the historic link with the Dukes of Argyll.

== Bibliography ==
- Chamberlain, Muriel E. Lord Aberdeen. Longman, 1983.
- Stephen, Leslie (ed.) Dictionary of National Biography, Volume 8. Macmillan, 1886.
- Zamoyski, Adam. Rites of Peace: The Fall of Napoleon & the Congress of Vienna. HarperPress, 2007.
