= Argyll Street =

Street in Central London

Coordinates: 51.51448°N 0.14058°W

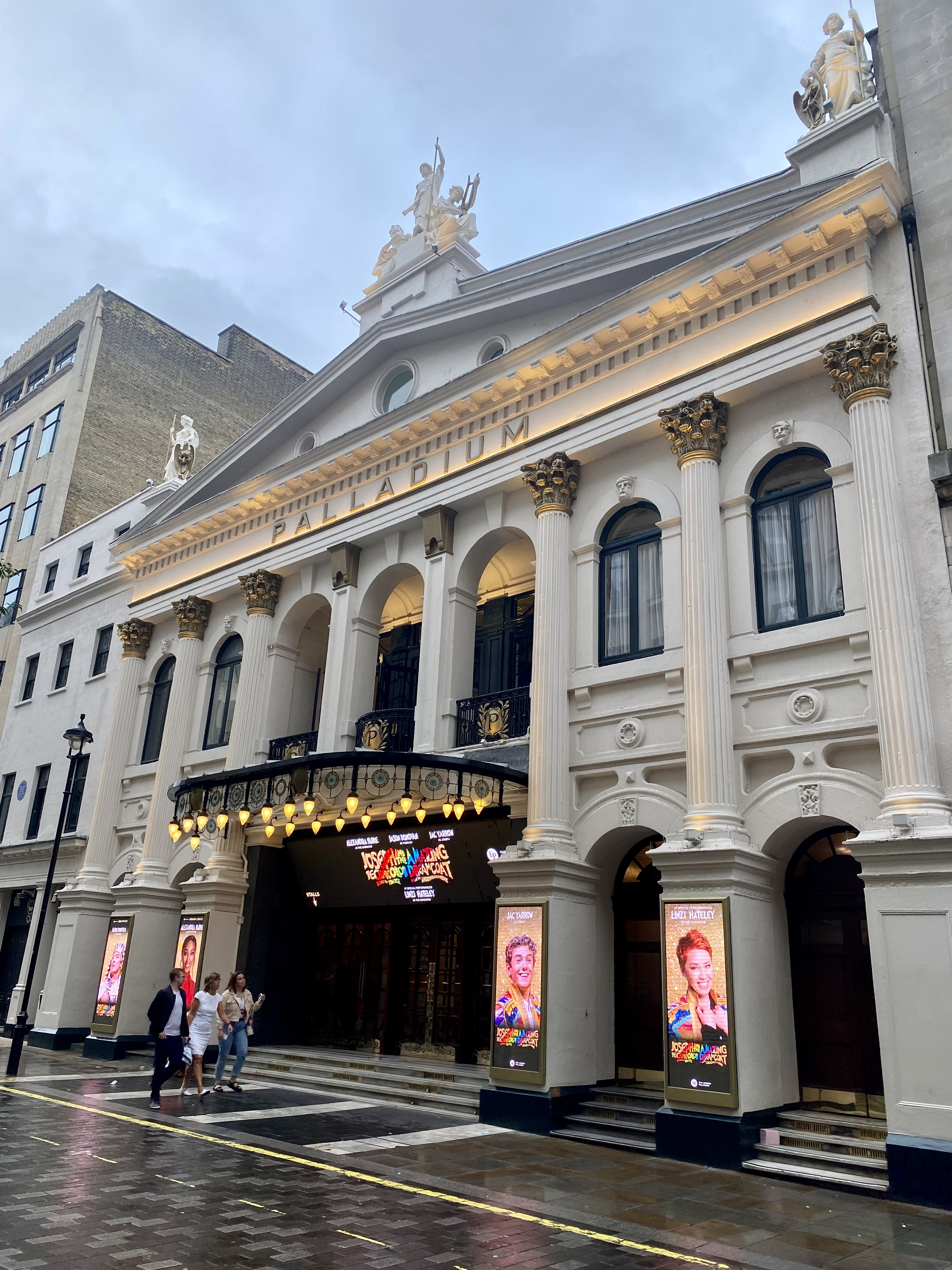
The London Palladium

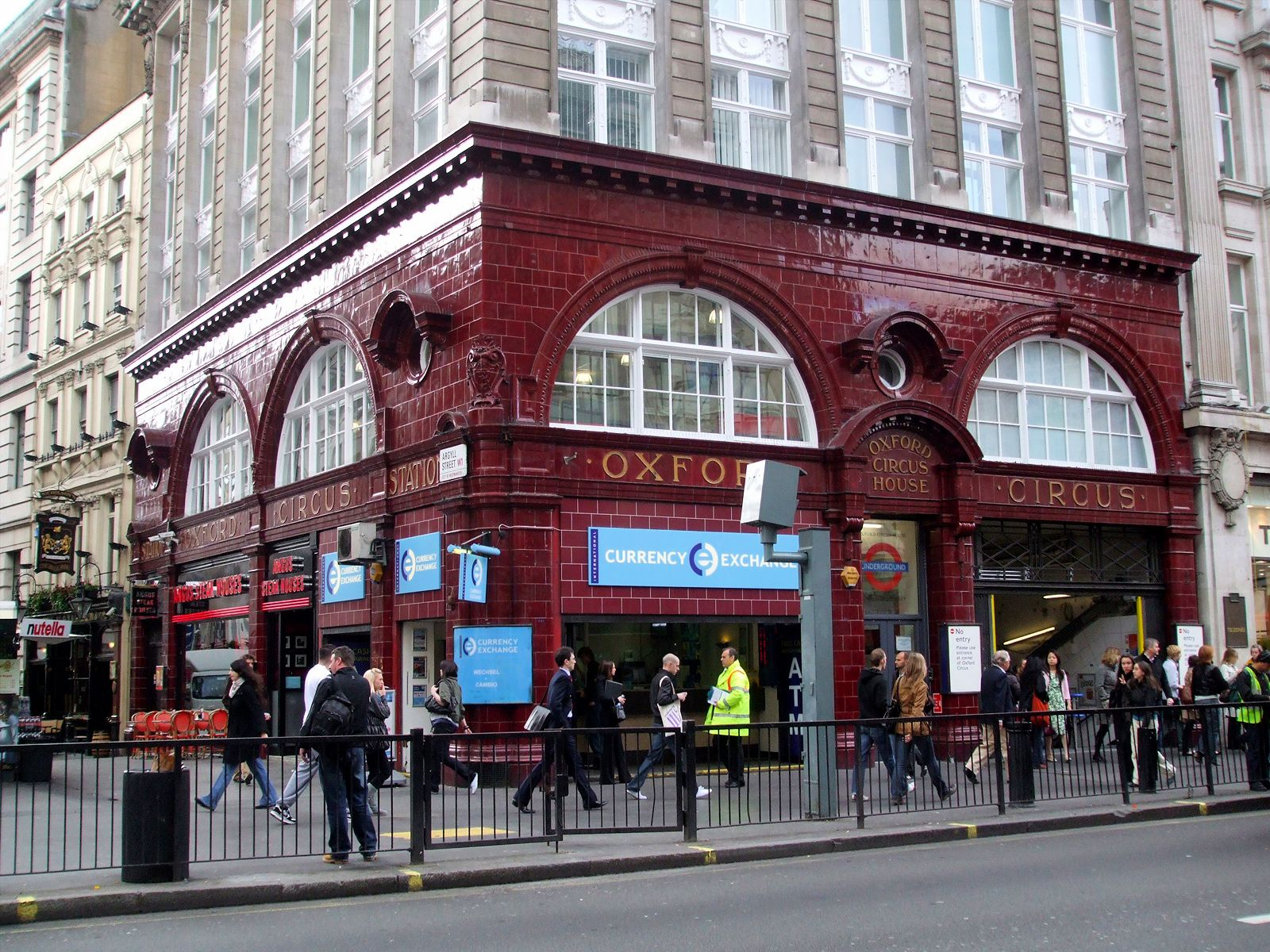
Oxford Circus tube station where Argyll Street meets Oxford Street

Argyll Street is a street in the Soho district of Central London. It links Great Marlborough Street to the south to Oxford Street in the north and is connected to Regent Street to the west by Little Argyll Street. Historically it was sometimes written as Argyle Street.

== History ==
The street takes its name from John Campbell, 2nd Duke of Argyll who bought a large property on the south side of Oxford Street in the early 18th century. In 1736 Argyll chose to demolish his house and to create Argyll Street as a residential street with a number of smaller townhouses on the site, designed by the architect James Gibbs. His younger brother Archibald had built a nearby mansion named Argyll House. This was not redeveloped when the street was constructed, and it passed through the hands of various Dukes of Argyll until 1808. The future Foreign Secretary and Prime Minister Lord Aberdeen bought Argyll House and made it his London residence for many years. Following Aberdeen's death in 1860, Argyll House was demolished and the site redeveloped, eventually becoming a West End theatre, the London Palladium.

== Argyll Arms ==
The Argyll Arms was rebuilt in 1868 on the site of an 18th century pub. In 1905 an entrance to the new Bakerloo Line section of Oxford Circus tube station was opened on the corner with Oxford Street adjacent to the pub. It was designed by Leslie Green in the oxblood Modern Style common to many underground stations of the era. At the southern end of the street the art deco Ideal House was built in the 1920s.

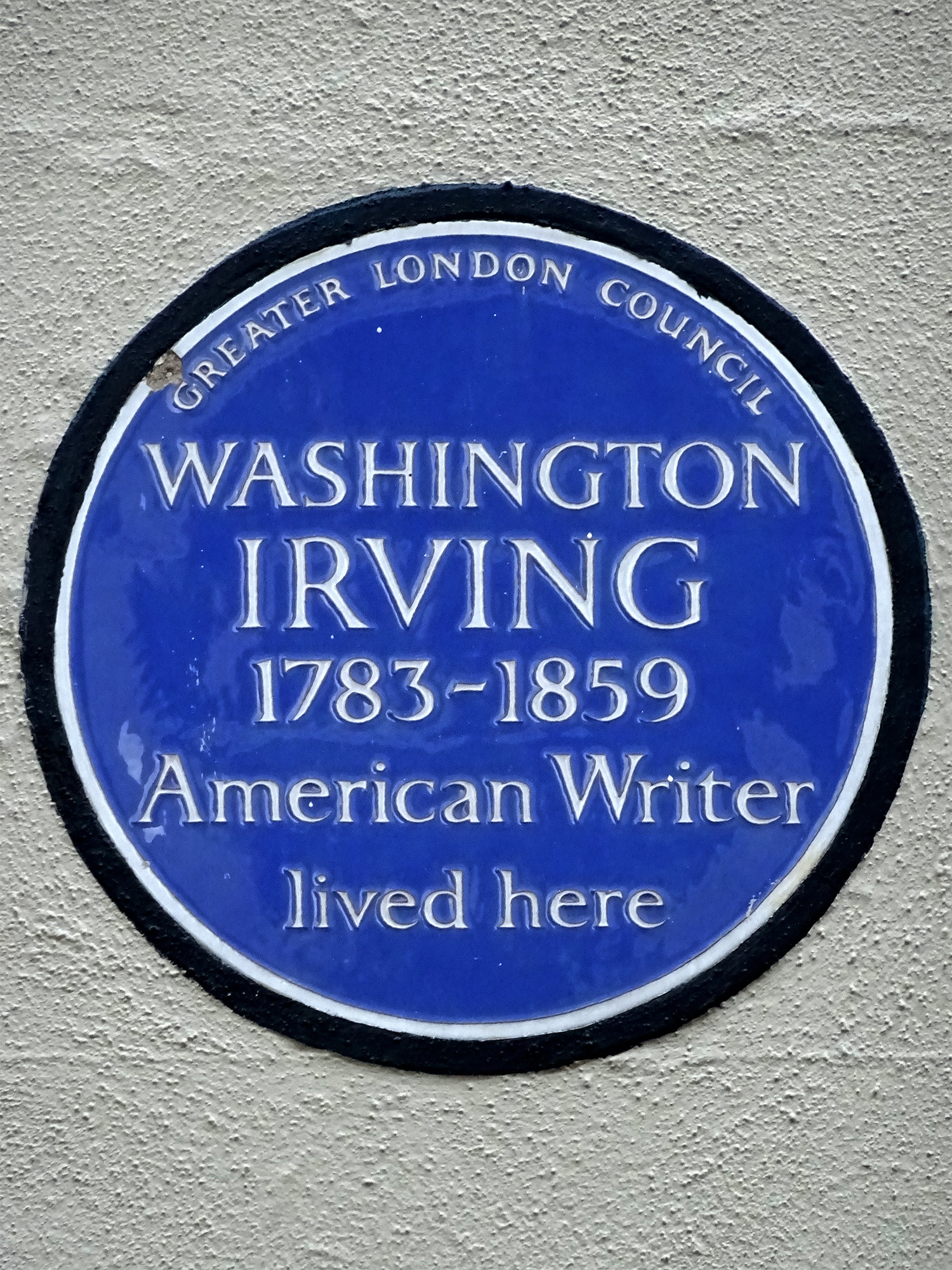
American writer Washington Irving lived in the street in the early 1830s.

== Notable residents ==
Notable residents in the street have included William Roy, the pioneer of the Ordnance Survey, and the writers Washington Irving and Germaine de Staël, all of whom are commemorated with blue plaques.

In addition the botanist Joseph Banks was born there in 1743 while the British statesman and future Prime Minister William Pitt the Elder married his wife Hester at her lodgings in Argyll Street in 1754.

Brian Epstein (1934–1967) managed the Beatles and other artists from his NEMS Enterprises offices at Sutherland House 5–6 Argyll Street from 1964, the high tide of Beatlemania, until his death in 1967.

== See also ==
- Argyll Rooms, located nearby

== Bibliography ==
- Chamberlain, Muriel E. Lord Aberdeen. Longman, 1983.
- Harwood, Elain. Art Deco Britain: Buildings of the Interwar Years. Batsford Books, 2019.
- Inwood, Stephen. Historic London: An Explorer's Companion. Pan Macmillan, 2012.
- Mander, Raymond & Mitchenson, Joe. The Theatres of London. New English Library, 1975.
- Manning, Anne. The Journey from Blandford to Hayes: The Life and Times of Two Prime Ministers, William Pitt (Earl of Chatham) and William Pitt the Younger. Bromley Leisure & Community Services, 2009.
- Wheatley, Henry Benjamin. London, Past and Present: Its History, Associations, and Traditions, Volume 1. J. Murray, 1891.
