= William Robert Colton =

British artist (1867–1921)

William Robert Colton RA
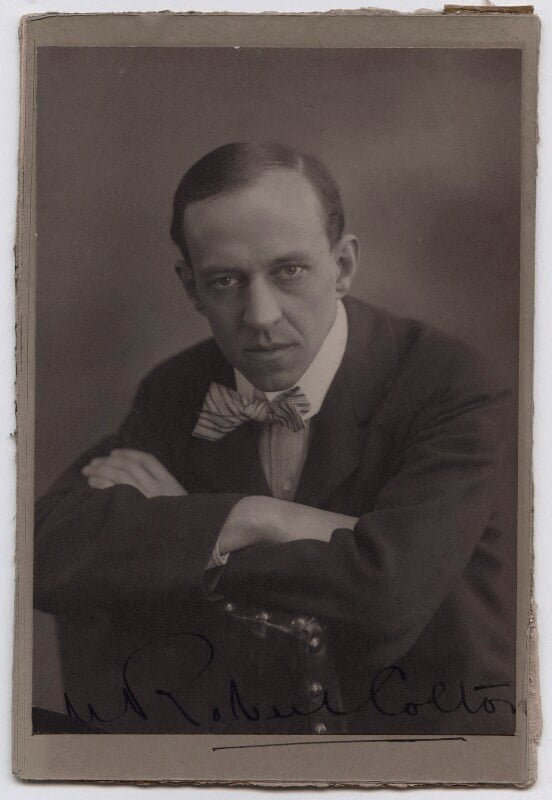
- Colton in the 1900s
- Born: 25 December 1867; Paris, France
- Died: 13 November 1921 (aged 53); Kensington, England
- Education: Lambeth School of Art; Royal Academy Schools
- Known for: Sculpture

William Robert Colton RA (25 December 1867 – 13 November 1921) was a British sculptor. After completing his studies in London and Paris, Colton established himself with solid, career-long business relationships, secured admission to exhibitions at the Royal Academy and the Salon in Paris. His works included commissions for busts, statues and war memorials. His clientele included royalty in England and India.

During his career, Colton was a professor at the Royal Academy, president of the Royal British Society of Sculptors and full member at the Royal Academy.

== Early life ==
Colton was born in Paris on 25 December 1867. His father was an architect. In 1870 Colton left Paris for London. He studied at the Lambeth School of Art in England under William Silver Frith before enrolling as a student in the Royal Academy in 1889. At the Royal Academy, he was taught by Henry Hugh Armstead and Sir Joseph Edgar Boehm. He also studied in Paris.

== Career ==
=== Commissions ===
Within two years of his 20th birthday, Colton was exhibiting at both the Paris Salon and the Royal Academy. Auguste Rodin and Alfred Gilbert provided inspiration for Colton's work.

He received a commission from the Krishna Raja Wadiyar IV, Maharajah of Mysore and continued to receive commissions from India throughout his career. Besides his engagements for work in England, Colton also received commissions for work in Australia and South Africa. On 21 January 1903 Colton was elected as an Associate to the Royal Academy. He became a full member sixteen years later in 1919 on 25 April. In 1921 he became the president of the Royal British Society of Sculptors (RBS).

=== Education ===
From 1907 to 1911 he was Professor of Sculpture at the Royal Academy.

== Works ==
=== Sculptures ===
This is a partial list of Colton's sculptures, busts and plaques.

Name	Year	Comments	Exhibitions	Image
The Head	1889	Completed at Colchester Square, St George's Square.		
The young St John	1890	Statue. Completed at St John's Wood.		
A crown of glory	1890	Bust. Completed at St John's Wood.		
Tender blossoms	1892	Head in terra cotta. Completed at St John's Wood.		
D. G. Pinkney, Esquire	1892	Bust in terra cotta. Completed at St John's Wood.		
Little Nell	1896	Fountain and Hyde Park, which "first drew notice to himself." The original has been replaced by a copy and is located in Hyde Park.		
The Image Finder	1897	The work was made in Eaton Studio, St John's Wood.		
The Girdle/La Ceinture	1898	A bronze statue of a seated woman who is dressing for the day. Her hair is disheveled as she is in the process of putting on a girdle. The work was made in Eaton Studio, St John's Wood. The statue was purchased by the Chantrey Fund Trustees and is in Tate Britain.		
The Young Diana	1902	Bust. His diploma work, which can be seen at Burlington House.		
Dr. Henry Wells Armstead	1902	Bust, which can be seen at Burlington House.		
The River Unto the Sea	1903			
In the Springtide of Life	1903	The work earned him election as an Associate of the Royal Academy and was also purchased for the Tate by the Chantrey Trustees. This work is now in the Harris Museum in Preston, Lancashire.		
HH The Maharajah of Mysore	1905	Bust	Royal Academy.	
King Edward VII	1906	The seated figure of King Edward VII at King Edward VII School, King's Lynn.		
Sir Sheshadri Iyer, Dewan of Mysore	1907	Bust	Royal Academy.	
George and Sir Richard Tangye	1908	Bronze plaque in Birmingham Museum and Art Gallery.		
Love's Bondage	1911	The work is in the Art Gallery of New South Wales.		
Field-Marshal Earl Roberts	1915	Bust	Royal Academy.	
Angas Memorial	1915	First, it was located in the Prince Henry Gardens. Then, in 1929 when North Terrace was being redeveloped it relocated to Park 12, Adelaide.		
Lieutenant-Colonel Sir George Roos Keppel	1916	Bust	Royal Academy.	
Memorial to Sir Richard and George Tangye	1916	The bronze relief of the work is in Birmingham City Art Gallery.		
Marjorie Brassey	1917	Bust	Royal Academy.	
Diana	1917	Bust	Royal Academy.	
Rt Hon H H Asquith	1920	Bust	Royal Academy.	
Explorer Captain Matthew Flinders	Unknown	The statue stands in front of the Mitchell Library in Sydney, Australia and was unveiled in 1925.		
The Crown of Love	Unknown	The work was made in Eaton Studio, St John's Wood.		

=== War memorials ===
==== Worcester Boer War Memorial ====
The Worcester Boer War Memorial, located in the grounds of Worcester Cathedral, is a bronze depiction of a hatless figure who is protected by an angel. The memorial consists of a three-stepped base surmounted by a plinth, pedestal and figure of a soldier of the Worcester Regiment kneeling as he prepares to fire his last cartridge. A winged figure said to represent "Immortality" stands above him with a palm branch in one hand, and in the other hand a sheathed sword with laurel wreath on it. The memorial is dedicated to the men of Worcestershire killed in the South African War. It was unveiled on 23 September 1908 by Lt. Gen. the Hon. Sir N. G. Lyttleton. The monument was restored in 2005.

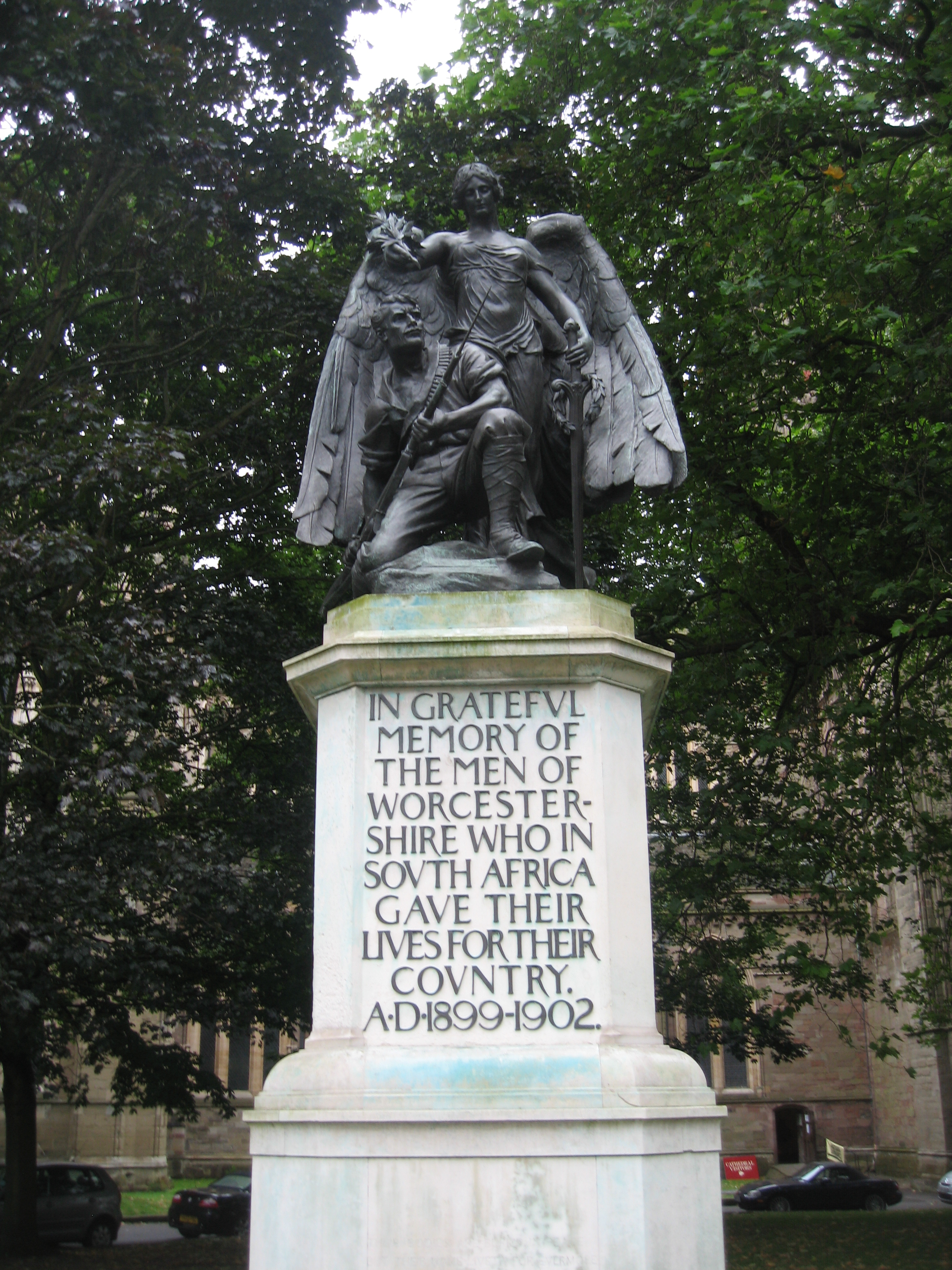
Worcester Boer War Memorial

==== Royal Artillery Boer War Memorial ====
The Royal Artillery Boer War Memorial is on the corner of St James's Park in The Mall in central London. The memorial was designed by Sir Aston Webb and the bronze sculpture, including Pegasus and the two relief tablets, were executed by Colton. Completed in 1909 the composition was described by Colton as "War being controlled by peace, war being represented by a war horse & peace being a winged female figure." In the same letter Colton writes that the work "has become in a sense a part of the Queen Victoria Memorial Scheme." The pillars list the 1,078 men who died in the South African war of 1899-1902 and relief panels show the unit in action. The memorial was unveiled in 1920 by the Duke of Connaught, using an electronic remote control from a memorial service in St Paul's Cathedral. The memorial was erected by the officers and men of the Royal Artillery in memory of their honoured dead. The pedestal is in Portland stone and the sculpture, reliefs and panels with the names of those remembered, are all in bronze.

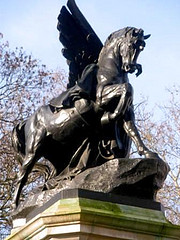
Royal Artillery Boer War Memorial

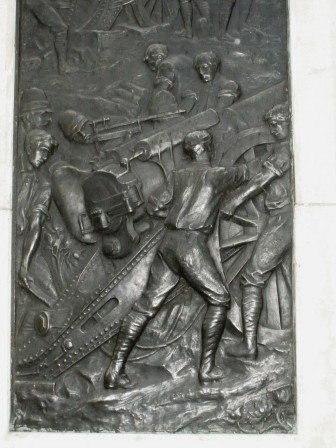
Relief on the Royal Artillery Boer War Memorial.

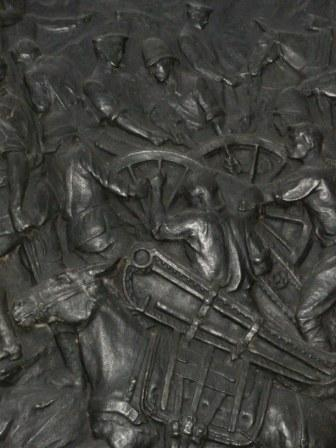
Relief on the Royal Artillery Boer War Memorial.

==== W. T. Wyllie Memorial ====
The W. T. Wyllie memorial in Portsmouth Cathedral is positioned on the East wall of the Quire and east of the Corporation Pew and remembers the second son of William Lionel and Marion Amy Wyllie. William Thomas Wyllie served with the 2nd Durham Light Infantry and was killed in action at Montauban on the Somme on 19 July 1916. He was acting as a Brigade Major at the time and is buried in Mametz Cemetery. He left a widow and three children. The memorial features a sculptured figure in silhouette/high relief which lies along the bottom half. This figure is the dead body of an officer lying on his back, arms by his side. His shirt sleeves are rolled up and he wears braces, trousers and boots. His head rests on a cushion surrounded by a laurel wreath. The inscription is incised in white lettering along the top half of the memorial. The bronze founders were Messrs A. B. Burton.

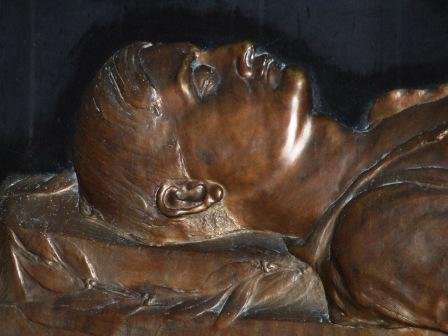

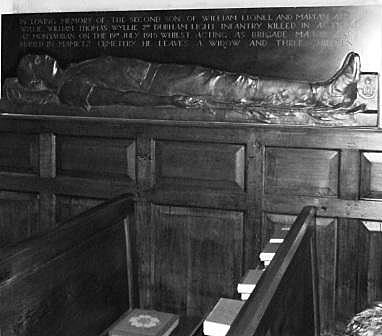

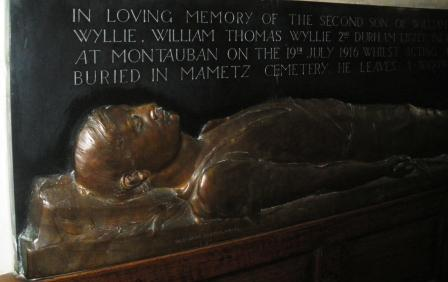

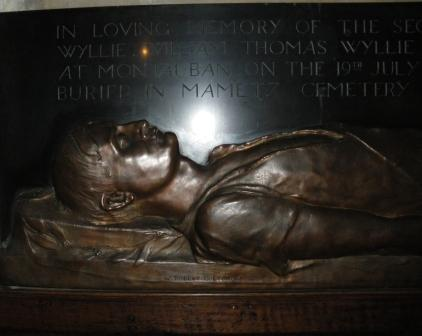

==== Captain F C Selous DSO ====
The memorial tablet dedicated to Captain Frederick Selous DSO is positioned at the head of the northwest staircase in the Central Hall of the Natural History Museum, London. The figure and plaque are in bronze and the tablet is in stone. The memorial consists of a cast bronze portrait of Captain Selous in uniform and carrying a rifle. This is set into a niche in the stone tablet. Below the niche is a bronze relief of lions. The inscriptions are arranged in two side panels in raised block lettering. The sculptor's name is placed at the bottom right. The inscription on the left panel reads Caption Frederick C. Selous D.S.O. Hunter Explorer and Naturalist.. On the right panel Born 1851 Killed in action at Beho-Beho German East Africa 4 1 1917.. Selous was buried in East Africa in what is now Tanzania.

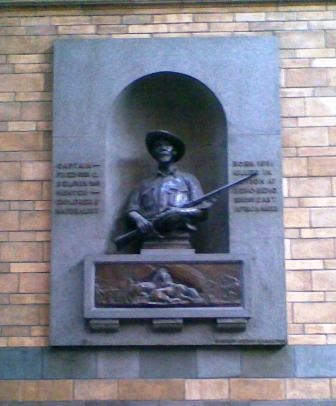
Selous memorial in the Natural History Museum

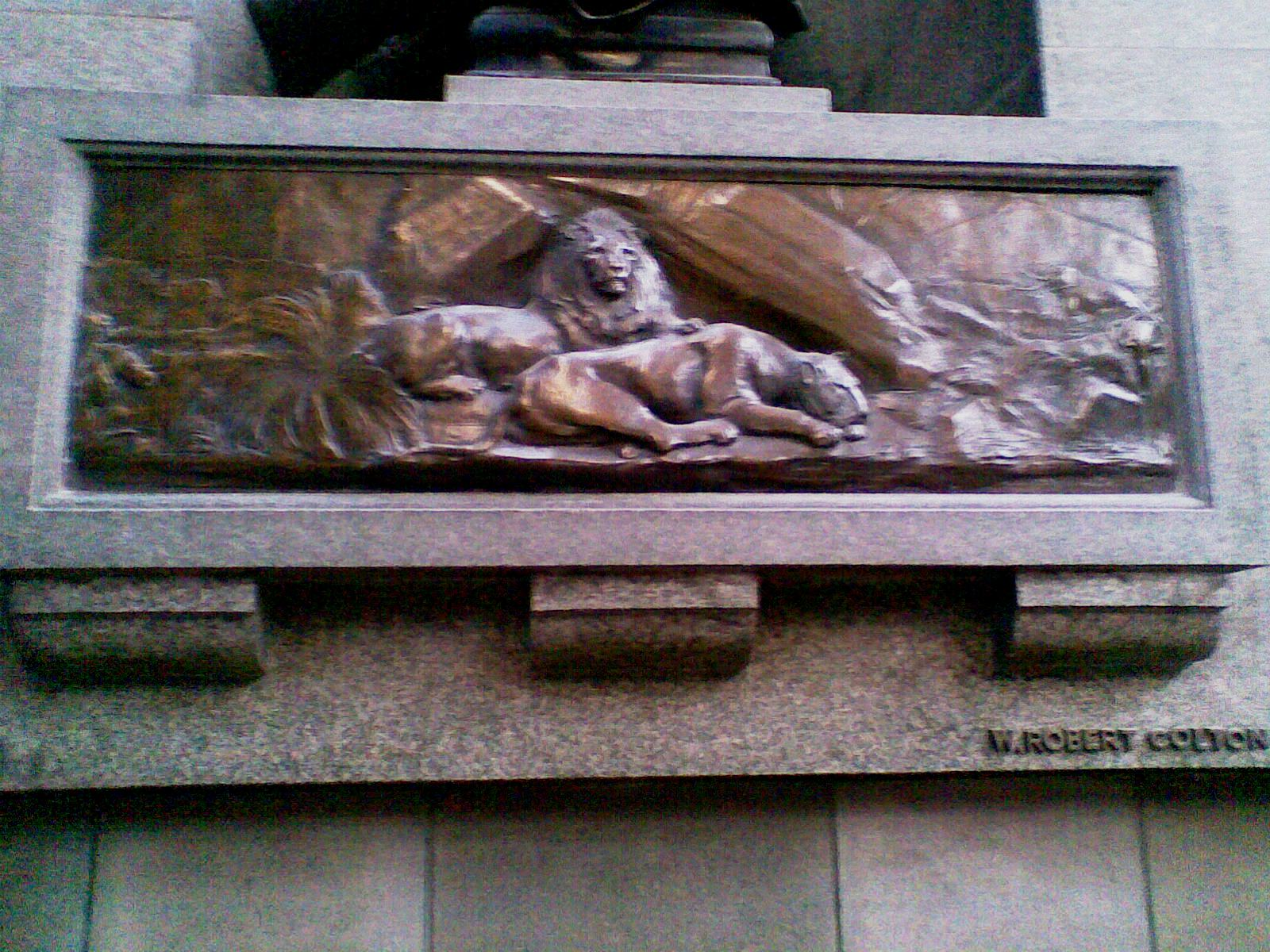
Relief on Selous memorial

==== Boyd and Claud Alexander ====
At St Dunstan's Church, Cranbrook, Kent, there is an alabaster memorial to Boyd and Claud Alexander who both died in Africa. Boyd Alexander served in the Rifle Brigade and was killed at Nyeri, Wadai, on 2 April 1910 and is remembered on the left side panel; Claud Alexander who served in the Scots Guards and died at Maifoni on 13 November 1904 is remembered on the right side panel. A representation of Africa in the form of a female figure holding arrows is positioned in the centre with busts of the two dead men on either side. The left hand panel includes representations of animals and trees and the right hand panel features a landscape scene.

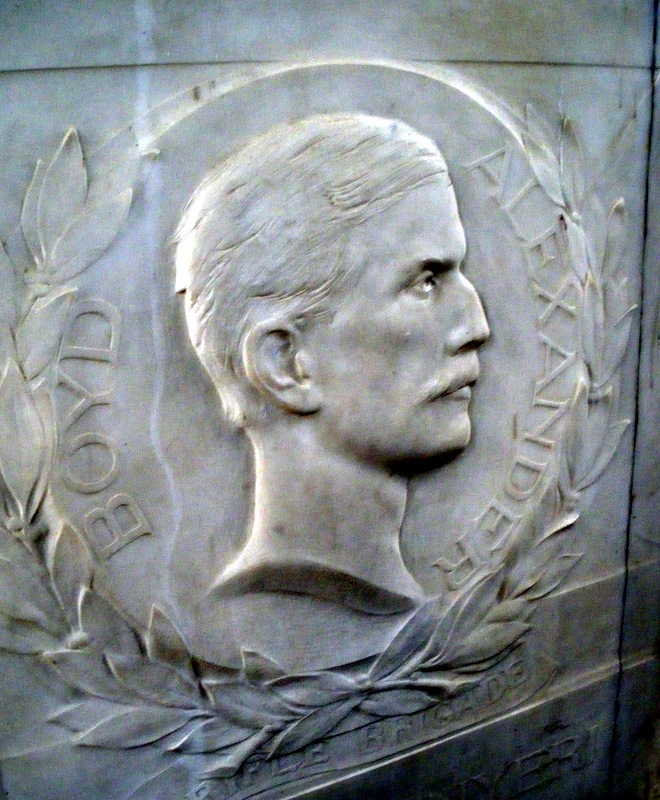
Boyd Alexander

==== Staffordshire County War Memorial ====
The memorial, on Victoria Road, Stafford, was designed by Colton but his early death meant that the sculptor L. S. Merrifield had to complete the work. The memorial is dedicated to the soldiers from Staffordshire who died in service to their country during World War I. The memorial stands on a four-stepped base surmounted by two plinths and a column. In Colton's composition we see the figure of an angel with olive branch and a horse. This grouping is modelled after the Royal Artillery Boer War Memorial. There is a Stafford knot on the front face of the pedestal. The memorial was completed in 1923, following Colton's death. The Earl of Dartmouth, whose son was one of the men memorialized by the monument, performed the unveiling.

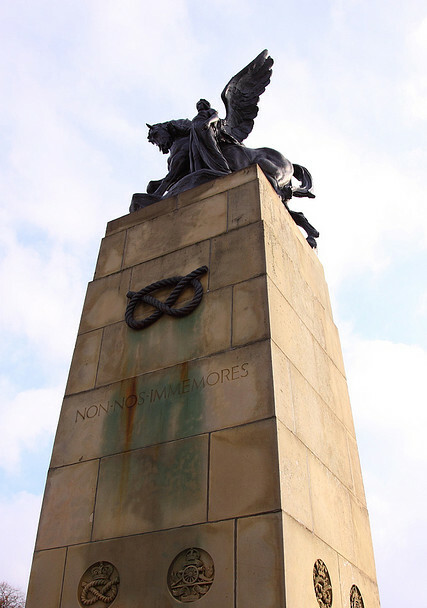
Staffordshire County War Memorial

== Personal life ==
In 1902 Colton married Mignon Kroll de Laporte. Two daughters were born to the couple.

Robert Colton died aged 53 on 13 November 1921 at St Mary Abbot's Place, Kensington. due to complications from a surgery approximately four weeks before his death.
