= Saville and Martin =

Messrs Saville and Martin were British architects who designed public houses in Victorian times. Their commissions included the 1890 Macclesfield (now known as De Hems) and The Tottenham. Their clients included the brothers Richard and William Baker who built up a large chain of fifty pubs in London.
