= Leonard Stanford Merrifield =

English sculptor

- Born: 1880; Wyck Rissington, Gloucestershire
- Died: 25 April 1943 (aged 62–63); London, England
- Education: Cheltenham School of Art; City and Guilds of London Art School; Royal Academy Schools
- Known for: Sculpture

Leonard Stanford Merrifield (1880 – 25 April 1943) was a British sculptor, notable for the public monuments he created in Cornwall and in Northern Ireland.

== Biography ==
Merrifield was born at Wyck Rissington in Gloucestershire and initially trained as a stone carver before studying at the Cheltenham School of Art. He moved to London to study at the City and Guilds of London Art School and then at the Royal Academy Schools. Throughout his career Merrifield was based in London and created statuettes and portraits busts plus a number of larger public monuments, statues and war memorials.

From 1906 to 1940 Merrifield was a regular exhibitor at the Royal Academy in London. In 1919 at the Royal Academy Exhibition of War Memorials, Merrifield showed a design of a statute of a soldier with bayonet fixed standing in front of a Celtic cross. Merrifield was subsequently commissioned to create a version of this design for the war memorial at Burnham in Buckinghamshire. He received a gold medal from the Paris Salon in 1939 and exhibited with both the Royal Glasgow Institute of the Fine Arts and the Royal West of England Academy. He was heavily involved with the Art Workers' Guild and was elected a Fellow of the Royal Society of British Sculptors in 1926. The National Museum Wales holds a marble bust of Robert Drane (1832-1914) and a bronze Pieta by Merrifield.

== Selected public works ==
Image	Title / subject	Location and coordinates	Date	Type	Material	Dimensions	Designation	Wikidata	Notes
More images	Alderman David Jones	The Marble Hall, Cardiff City Hall	1909	Bust	Marble				
More images	Robert Drane	National Museum Cardiff	1910	Bust	Marble	68.5cm			
More images	William Williams Pantycelyn	The Marble Hall, Cardiff City Hall	1916	Statue on pedestal	Marble				
	War memorial	Town Park, High Street, Burnham, Buckinghamshire	1920	Celtic cross with statue	Stone and bronze		Grade II	Q66478180	
More images	War memorial	The Strand, Newlyn, Cornwall	1920	Celtic cross with relief panel	Stone and bronze		Grade II	Q66478950	Monument designed by Sir Edward Prioleau Warren with relief panel by Merrifield.
	War memorial	Redburn Square, Holywood, County Down	1922	Statue on pedestal	Stone				
More images	Hedd Wyn	Trawsfynydd, Gwynedd	1923	Statue on stepped pedestal with tablet	Bronze, stone and stone		Grade II	Q29505236	
More images	Staffordshire County war memorial	Victoria Road, Stafford	1923	Statue group on cenotaph with panels	Bronze and stone	12m high	Grade II	Q26585719	Designed by William Robert Colton, completed by Merrifield
	War memorial	Town Square, Comber, County Down	1923	Statue on pedestal	Bronze and granite				
More images	Duke of Cornwall's Light Infantry war memorial	Outside of Duke of Cornwall's Light Infantry Museum, Bodmin, Cornwall	Sculpture 1922, erected 1924	Statue on pedestal and steps	Bronze and granite		Grade II*	Q2658734	
More images	Memorial to Charles Frohman	The Causeway, Marlow, Buckinghamshire	1924	Statue with drinking fountain	Stone		Grade II	Q26418122	Frohman died in the 1915 sinking of the RMS Lusitania.
More images	Richard Trevithick	Camborne, Cornwall	1928	Statue on pedestal with panels	Gilded bronze and granite		Grade II	Q26647292	
More images	War memorial	Church Place, Lurgan, County Armagh	1928	Statue on hexagonal dome structure	Bronze and stone				
More images	War memorial	Pontmorlais Circus, Merthyr Tydfil	1931	Three statues and surround	Bronze and Portland stone		Grade II	Q29489908	
More images	Edward Carson	Stormont Parliament Buildings, Belfast	1933	Statue on pedestal	Bronze and stone				
More images	Richard Trevithick	Gower Street, London	1933	Relief plaque	Bronze			Q50078783	
	King David and Miriam	York Minster, York		Two statues in niches	Stone				

=== Other works ===
- War memorial to Young Citizen Volunteers, the Royal Irish Rifles, Belfast City Hall
- Statue of Lord Craigavon, Stormont Parliament Buildings
- Statue of Asquith, Palace of Westminster, London, completed by Gilbert Bayes after Merrifield's death
