= Dell Restaurant =

Restaurant in Hyde Park, London

Coordinates: 51.504993°N 0.159898°W

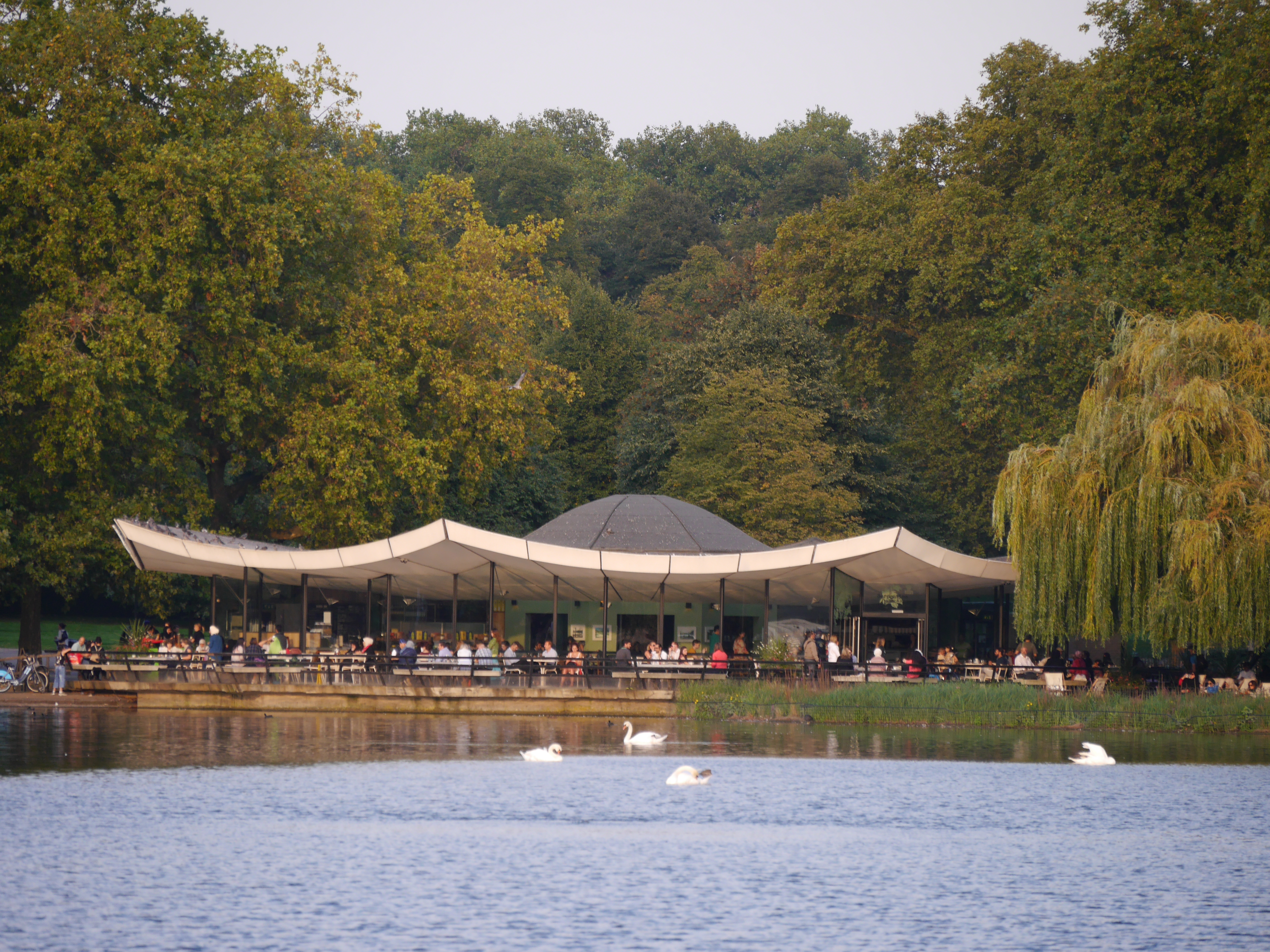
- Interactive map of Dell Restaurant

Restaurant information
- Location: Hyde Park, Serpentine Rd, London, W2 2UH, United Kingdom

The Dell Restaurant (now trading as the Serpentine Bar and Kitchen) is a Grade II* listed restaurant at the eastern end of the Serpentine in Hyde Park, London W2 2UH.

It was built in 1964 and designed by Patrick Gwynne.
