= The Prince Alfred, Maida Vale =

Listed pub in London, England

The Prince Alfred
- The pub in 2025

General information
- Type: Public house
- Location: 5A Formosa Street, Maida Vale, London, England
- Coordinates: 51.52436°N 0.18493°W
- Year built: 1863; 163 years ago
- Renovated: c. 1898 (remodelled); 2000 (altered)
- Owner: Young's

Design and construction
- Designations

Listed Building – Grade II*
- Official name: Prince Alfred public house
- Designated: 9 January 1970
- Reference no.: 1066328

Website
- theprincealfred.com

The Prince Alfred is a Grade II* listed public house on Formosa Street in Maida Vale, London, England. Built in 1863 and extensively remodelled in about 1898, it is noted for its well-preserved late-Victorian interior, including a rare compartmentalised layout with separate bars and surviving snob screens. It is included on the Campaign for Real Ale (CAMRA)'s National Inventory of Historic Pub Interiors, where it is awarded the highest three-star rating for interiors of "outstanding national historic importance". Historic England upgraded the building from Grade II to Grade II* in 2022 in recognition of its special architectural and historic interest.

== History ==
The Prince Alfred was built as part of the mid-19th-century development of the Maida Vale area and was established by 1863, appearing under its present name in trade directories by 1869. Originally operating as both a public house and hotel, the upper floors were later converted to residential use.

The pub was extensively remodelled around 1898 during a period of widespread investment in London's public houses. This work created the building's distinctive layout, with a central servery surrounded by a series of separate bar compartments divided by decorative snob screens. A dedicated ladies' bar was included, retaining features intended to provide greater privacy for customers. A billiards hall was also added at the rear.

On 9 January 1970, the Prince Alfred was designated a Grade II listed building. It was subsequently upgraded to Grade II* on 7 June 2022 in recognition of its exceptional historic interior.

It was included on the Campaign for Real Ale (CAMRA)'s National Inventory of Historic Pub Interiors before the inventory's grading system was revised. Under the revised scheme, it is rated three stars and its interior is regarded as being "of outstanding national historic importance".

The pub was featured in David Bowie's Grammy Award-winning short film Jazzin' for Blue Jean (1984), which served as the music video for his single "Blue Jean".

Alterations in 2000 included the conversion of the former billiards hall into a restaurant and associated changes to the cellar and service areas. Following damage to part of the ceiling in 2015, repairs were undertaken before the pub reopened in 2016. As of July 2026, the freehold was owned by Young's.

== Architecture ==
=== Exterior ===
The building is constructed of brick finished with stucco and covered by a slate roof. Decorative etched-glass windows, tiled surfaces and mosaic flooring survive around the ground-floor frontage. It has three storeys and occupies a prominent corner site, with the principal frontage facing Castellain Road and a secondary elevation on Formosa Street. A late Victorian remodelling introduced an elaborate pub frontage with detailed timberwork, recessed entrances and large curved windows containing decorative glass featuring floral and bird motifs. Ornamental plasterwork enhance the entrance areas, while period lamps are mounted along the exterior.

The upper floors largely retain the appearance established during the building's original construction in 1863, with sash windows, an ornate cornice, decorative frieze and cast-iron balcony railings extending across both principal elevations.

At the rear is a single-storey former billiard hall, added in the late 19th century. This extension has a shallow roof with a rooflight and faces Formosa Street, where its windows and exit door were replaced during refurbishment works completed in 2000.

=== Interior ===
Internally, the pub retains a notably compartmentalised layout, with several separate bar rooms arranged around a long central servery. The divisions between these spaces are formed by ornate timber screens incorporating decorative etched glass, carved detailing and balustrades. Small doors within the screens originally allowed staff to move between areas without using the public entrances.

One of the smaller bars, originally intended for female customers, retains privacy screens with rotating etched-glass panels. The bar counter was renewed during refurbishment works in 2000, while the large island bar back remains a prominent feature, incorporating classical decorative motifs, glazed shelving and a central clock bearing the pub's name. Additional decorative bar fittings survive behind the servery.

The principal bar contains a tiled dado and a marble fireplace surround, while a curved timber screen marks the entrance to the restaurant, formerly the billiards hall. Within the restaurant area, roof trusses and a rooflight from the former hall remain visible, together with a timber fireplace surround. Beneath this section of the building, the cellar retains stone-flagged floors, brick-vaulted compartments and some original stone and slate shelving. Toilet facilities were installed there during the 2000 refurbishment.

A staircase leading from the Formosa Street entrance to the upper residential accommodation retains its mid-19th-century iron balustrade.

== See also ==
- Grade II* listed buildings in the City of Westminster (A–Z)
