= Confirmation of bishops =

Ecclesiastical assent to election of new bishop

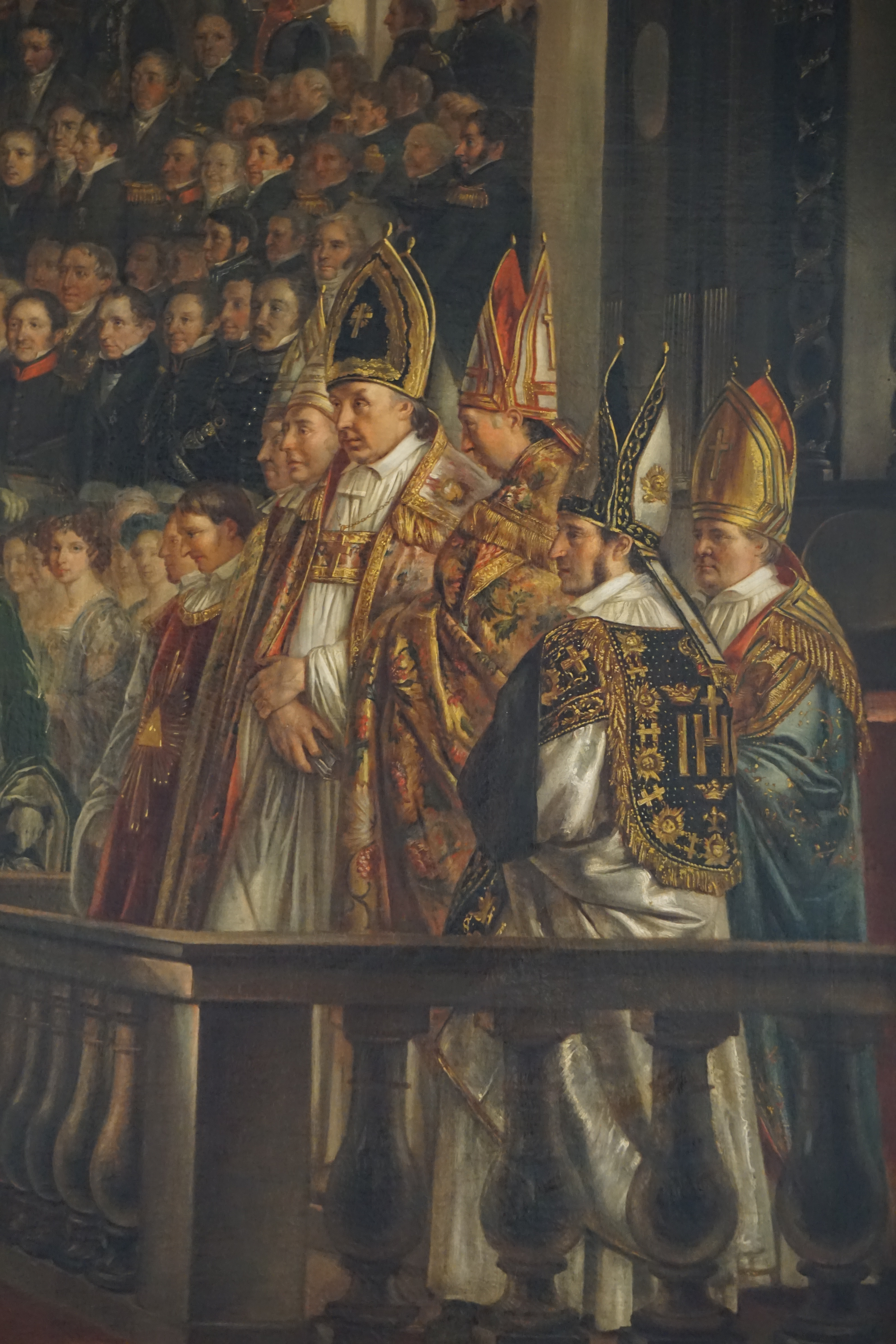
Karl XIV Johans kröning by Per Krafft the Younger (1818) depicting Evangelical-Lutheran bishops in Stockholm Cathedral

In canon law the confirmation of a bishop is the act by which the election of a new bishop receives the assent of the proper ecclesiastical authority.

== Early history ==
In the early centuries of the history of the Christian Church the election or appointment of a suffragan bishop was confirmed and approved by the metropolitan and his suffragans assembled in synod. By the 4th Canon of the First Council of Nicaea (325 AD), however, it was decreed that the right of confirmation should belong to the metropolitan bishop of each province, a rule confirmed by the 12th Canon of the Council of Laodicaea. For the appointment of a metropolitan no papal confirmation was required either in the West or East; but the practice which grew up, from the 6th century onwards, of the popes presenting the pallium, at first honoris causa, to newly appointed metropolitans gradually came to symbolize the licence to exercise metropolitan jurisdiction.

By the 8th and 9th centuries, the papal right of confirmation by this means was strenuously asserted; yet as late as the 13th century, there were instances of metropolitans exercising their functions without receiving the pallium, and it was not until after this date that the present rule and practice of the Roman Catholic Church was definitively established. The canonical right of the metropolitan to confirm the election of his suffragans was still affirmed by Gratian; but from the time of Pope Alexander III (1159–1181) the canon lawyers, under the influence of the False Decretals, began to claim this right for the pope.

== By Christian denomination ==
=== Catholicism ===
From the 13th century onwards, it was effectively exercised, though the all but universal practice of the popes of reserving and providing to vacant bishoprics, initiated by Pope Clement V, obscured the issue, since in the case of papal nominations no confirmation was required. The question, however, was raised, in connection with that of the papal reservations and provisions, at the councils of Constance and Basel. The former shelved it in the interests of peace; but the latter once more formulated the principle that elections in the churches were to be free and their result confirmed according to the provisions of the common law (juxta juris communis dispositionem), i.e. by the immediate superior to whom the right of confirmation belonged. In Roman Catholic countries the complete control of the papacy over the election and appointment of bishops has since the Protestant Reformation become firmly established, in spite of the efforts of Gallicans and Febronians to reassert what they held to be the more Catholic usage.

=== Evangelical Lutheranism ===
In Evangelical-Lutheran Churches belonging to the historic episcopate, bishops are elected prior to assuming their office.

=== Anglicanism ===
==== Confirmation in the Church of England ====
It is the confirmation of the election which actually makes the candidate bishop of the diocese

— a Church of England review group, Working with the Spirit: Choosing Diocesan Bishops: a Review of the Operation of the Crown Appointments Commission and Related Matters, page 81, section 5.24

In England, where the abuse of provisors had been most acutely felt, the matter was dealt with during the vacancy of the Holy See between the deposition of Antipope John XXIII at Constance (May 1415) and the election of Pope Martin V (November 1417). During the interval the only possible way of appointing a bishop was by the ancient method of canonical election and confirmation. Shortly after the deposition of John XXIII, Henry V of England assented to an ordinance that during the voidance of the Holy See bishops elect should be confirmed by their metropolitans; but the ordinance was not recorded on the Statute Roll. Three bishops only, namely: John Chandler (or Cjaaundeler), Bishop of Salisbury; Edmund Lacey, Bishop of Hereford; and John Wakering, Bishop of Norwich, were confirmed by Henry Chichele, Archbishop of Canterbury during the papal vacancy. When Martin V was elected pope in 1417 he resumed the practice of providing bishops, and from this time until the English Reformation the canonical election and confirmation of a bishop in England was a rare exception.

With the independence of the Church of England the role of the papacy in appointing bishops was abolished, but the confirmation became almost formal in character. By 25 Hen. 8. c. 20, s. 4 it is provided that after an episcopal election a royal mandate shall issue to the archbishop of the province requiring him to confirm the said election or, in case of an archbishop-elect, to one archbishop and two bishops, or to four bishops, requiring and commanding them with all speed and celerity to confirm it. This practice still prevails in the case of dioceses which have chapters to elect. The confirmation has usually been performed by the archbishop's vicar-general and, in the southern province, at the church of St Mary-le-Bow, London (as the permanent home of the Arches Court); but since 1901 it has also been performed variously at: Church House, Westminster; at Lambeth Palace; at the Archbishop's Faculty Office (1 The Sanctuary, Westminster); and at St Paul's—in consequence of the disorder in the proceedings at St Mary-le-Bow on the confirmation there of Arthur Winnington-Ingram as Bishop of London. All objectors are cited to appear on pain of contumacy after the old form; but although the knowledge that opposition might be offered has been a safeguard against improper nominations, e.g. in the case of Samuel Clarke the Arian, confirmation has never been refused since the Reformation. In 1628, Dr. Rives, acting for the vicar-general, declined to receive objections made to Richard Montagu's election to the See of Chichester on the ground that they were not made in legal form. An informal protest against the confirmation of James Prince Lee as Bishop of Manchester in 1848 was almost immediately followed by another in due form against that of Renn Hampden, Bishop-elect of Hereford. The vicar-general refused to receive the objections and an application to the Queen's bench for a mandamus was unsuccessful, the judges being divided two against two.

Around the time of Rowan Williams' confirmation to Canterbury in 2002, Lambeth Palace described the canonical election as "the choice of the bishop by the Diocese [they] will serve" and the confirmation as "the affirmation of [their] Election by the wider Church." On that occasion (2 December 2002) and at Justin Welby's confirmation (4 February 2013), the respective Archbishops of York were assisted by eight bishops of the Province of Canterbury: the six other officers of the provincial chapter (London, Winchester, Salisbury, Worcester, Rochester, and Lincoln); plus the two next most longest-serving (i.e. Lichfield and Oxford in 2002, Leicester and Norwich in 2013).

==== Confirmation in the Church in Wales ====
Since its disestablishment and severance from the Church of England, the Church in Wales's procedures for electing and confirming bishops have developed differently. Under Chapter V (paragraph 11) of the current Constitution of the Church in Wales, a bishop's election is confirmed by the Bench of Bishops (i.e. such of the six diocesan bishops as are in post) "assembled in Synod". As such, an assembly of the bishops in order to confirm an election has become known as a Sacred Synod. The use of the term occurs as early as 1939, and was in formal use by 1999.
