= Henry Chichele =

Archbishop of Canterbury from 1414 to 1443

The Most Reverend Henry Chichele
- Archbishop of Canterbury; Primate of All England
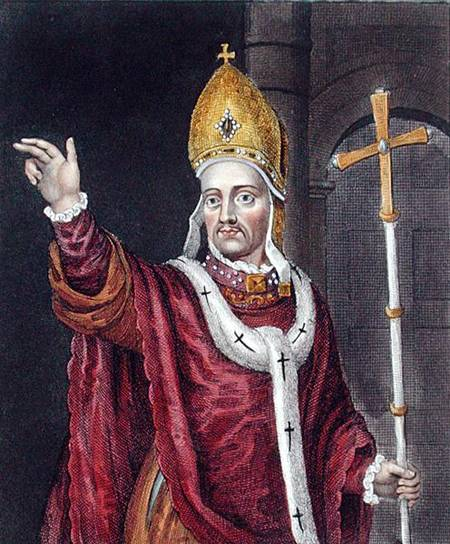
- 19th-century imaginary portrait of Henry Chichele
- Church: Catholic Church
- Appointed: 28 April 1414
- Term ended: 12 April 1443
- Predecessor: Thomas Arundel
- Successor: John Stafford
- Other post: Bishop of St Davids

Orders
- Consecration: 17 June 1408 by Gregory XII

Personal details
- Born: 1363 or 1364
- Died: 12 April 1443
- Coat of arms: Henry Chichele's coat of arms

Arms of Chichele: Or, a chevron between three cinquefoils gules

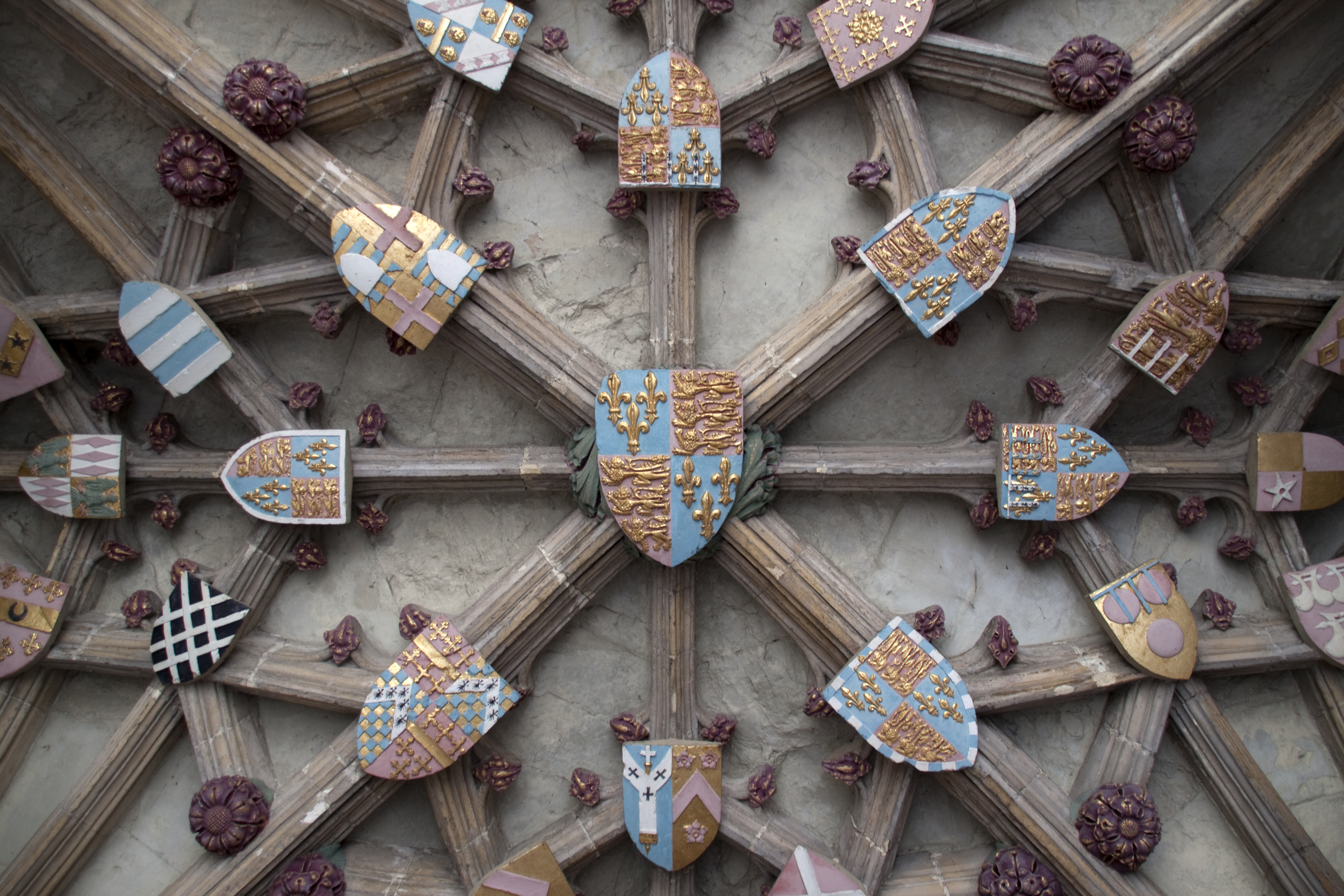
Ceiling of entrance of Canterbury Cathedral showing the king's arms in centre surrounded by 8 shields: 5 royal princes and dukes, the arms of Mortimer, Beauchamp (Richard de Beauchamp, 13th Earl of Warwick (1382–1439)) and Archbishop Henry Chichele impaled by arms of See of Canterbury (bottom)

Henry Chichele (/ˈtʃɪtʃəli/ CHICH-ə-lee; also Checheley; c. 1364 – 12 April 1443) was Archbishop of Canterbury (1414–1443) and the founder of All Souls College, Oxford.

== Early life ==
Chichele was born at Higham Ferrers, Northamptonshire, in 1363 or 1364; Chichele told Pope Eugene IV, in 1443, in asking leave to retire from the archbishopric, that he was in his eightieth year. He was the third and youngest son of Thomas Chichele, who appears in 1368 in extant town records of Higham Ferrers, as a suitor in the mayor's court, and in 1381–1382, and again in 1384–1385, was mayor: in fact, for a dozen years he and Henry Barton, schoolmaster of Higham Ferrers grammar school, and one Richard Brabazon, filled the mayoralty in turns.

Thomas Chichele's occupation does not appear but his eldest son, William, is on the earliest extant list (1383) of the Grocers' Company in London. On 9 June 1405 Henry Chichele was admitted, in succession to his father, to a burgage in Higham Ferrers. His mother, Agnes Pincheon, is said to have been of gentle birth. There is therefore no foundation in fact for the account (copied into the Dictionary of National Biography from a local historian, John Cole, Wellingborough, 1838) that he was picked up, as a poor ploughboy "eating his scanty meal off his mother's lap", by William of Wykeham. This story was unknown to Arthur Duck, Fellow of All Souls, who wrote Chichele's life in 1617.

=== Education ===
The first recorded appearance of Chichele himself is at New College, Oxford, as "Checheley", eighth among the undergraduate fellows, in July 1387, in the earliest extant hall-book, which contains weekly lists of those dining in Hall. It is often claimed that he was one of the earliest scholars of Winchester College, which was historically the sole feeder of New College. However, Winchester was not operational until 1394, by which time Chichele had already left Winchester and Oxford, and he does not feature in the College's complete Register of Scholars. He probably did study under William of Wykeham in Winchester, although not as a scholar of Winchester College, and for this reason can be considered an Old Wykehamist.

Chichele appears in the Hall-books of New College up to the year 1392/93, when he was a B.A. and was absent for ten weeks from about 6 December to 6 March, presumably for the purpose of his ordination as a sub-deacon, which was performed by the bishop of Derry, acting as suffragan to the bishop of London. He was then already beneficed, receiving a royal ratification of his estate as parson of Llanvarchell in the diocese of St Asaph on 20 March 1391/92 (Cat. Pat. Rolls).

== Career ==
=== Legal career ===
In the Hall-book, marked 1393/94, but really for 1394/95, Chichele's name does not appear. He had then left the University of Oxford and gone up to London to practise as an advocate in the principal ecclesiastical court, the Court of Arches. His rise was rapid. Already on 8 February 1395/96 he was, on a commission with several knights and clerks to hear an appeal in a case of John Molton, Esquire v. John Shawe, citizen of London, from Sir John Cheyne kt., sitting for the constable of England in a court of chivalry.

Like other ecclesiastical lawyers and civil servants of the day Chichele was paid with ecclesiastical preferments. On 13 April 1396, he obtained ratification of the parsonage of St Stephen Walbrook, presented on 30 March by the abbot of Colchester, no doubt through his brother Robert, who restored the church and increased its endowment. In 1397 he was made archdeacon of Dorset by Richard Mitford, bishop of Salisbury, but litigation was still going on about it in the papal court until 27 June 1399, when the pope extinguished the suit, imposing perpetual silence on Nicholas Bubwith, master of the rolls, his opponent. In the first year of Henry IV Chichele was parson of Sherston, Wiltshire, and prebendary of Nantgwyly in the college of Abergwili, Wales; on 23 February 1401/2, now called doctor of laws, he was pardoned for bringing in, and allowed to use, a bull of the pope providing to him the chancellorship of Salisbury Cathedral, and canonries in the nuns' churches of Shaftesbury and Wilton in that diocese; and on 9 January 1402/3 he was archdeacon of Salisbury.

=== Royal service ===
This year his brother Robert Chichele was senior sheriff of London. On 7 May 1404, Pope Boniface IX provided him to a prebend at Lincoln, notwithstanding he already held prebends at Salisbury, Lichfield, St Martins-le-Grand and Abergwyly, and the living of Brington. On 9 January 1405 he found time to attend a court at Higham Ferrers and be admitted to a burgage there. In July 1405 Chichele began a diplomatic career by a mission to the new Roman Pope Innocent VII, who was professing his desire to end the schism in the papacy by resignation, if his French rival at Avignon would do likewise. Next year, on 5 October 1406, he was sent with Sir John Cheyne to Paris to arrange a lasting peace and the marriage of Prince Henry with the French princess Marie, which was frustrated by her becoming a nun at Poissy next year.

In 1406 renewed efforts were made to stop the schism, and Chichele was one of the envoys sent to the new Pope Gregory XII. Here he utilised his opportunities. On 31 August 1407 Guy Mone (he is always so spelt and not Mohun, and was probably from one of the Hampshire Meons; there was a John Mone of Havant admitted a Winchester scholar in 1397), Bishop of St Davids, died, and on 12 October 1407 Chichele was by the pope provided to the bishopric of St Davids. Another bull the same day gave him the right to hold all his benefices with the bishopric. He was consecrated on 17 June 1408.

At Siena in July 1408 he and Sir John Cheyne, as English envoys, were received by Gregory XII with special honour, and Bishop Repingdon of Lincoln, ex-Wycliffite, was one of the new batch of cardinals created on 18 September 1408, most of Gregory's cardinals having deserted him. These, together with Benedict's revolting cardinals, summoned a general council at Pisa. In November 1408 Chichele was back at Westminster, when Henry IV received the cardinal archbishop of Bordeaux and determined to support the cardinals at Pisa against both popes. In January 1409 Chichele was named with Bishop Hallam of Salisbury and the prior of Canterbury to represent the Southern Convocation at the council, which opened on 25 March 1409, arriving on 24 April. Obedience was withdrawn from both the existing popes, and on 26 June a new pope elected instead of them.

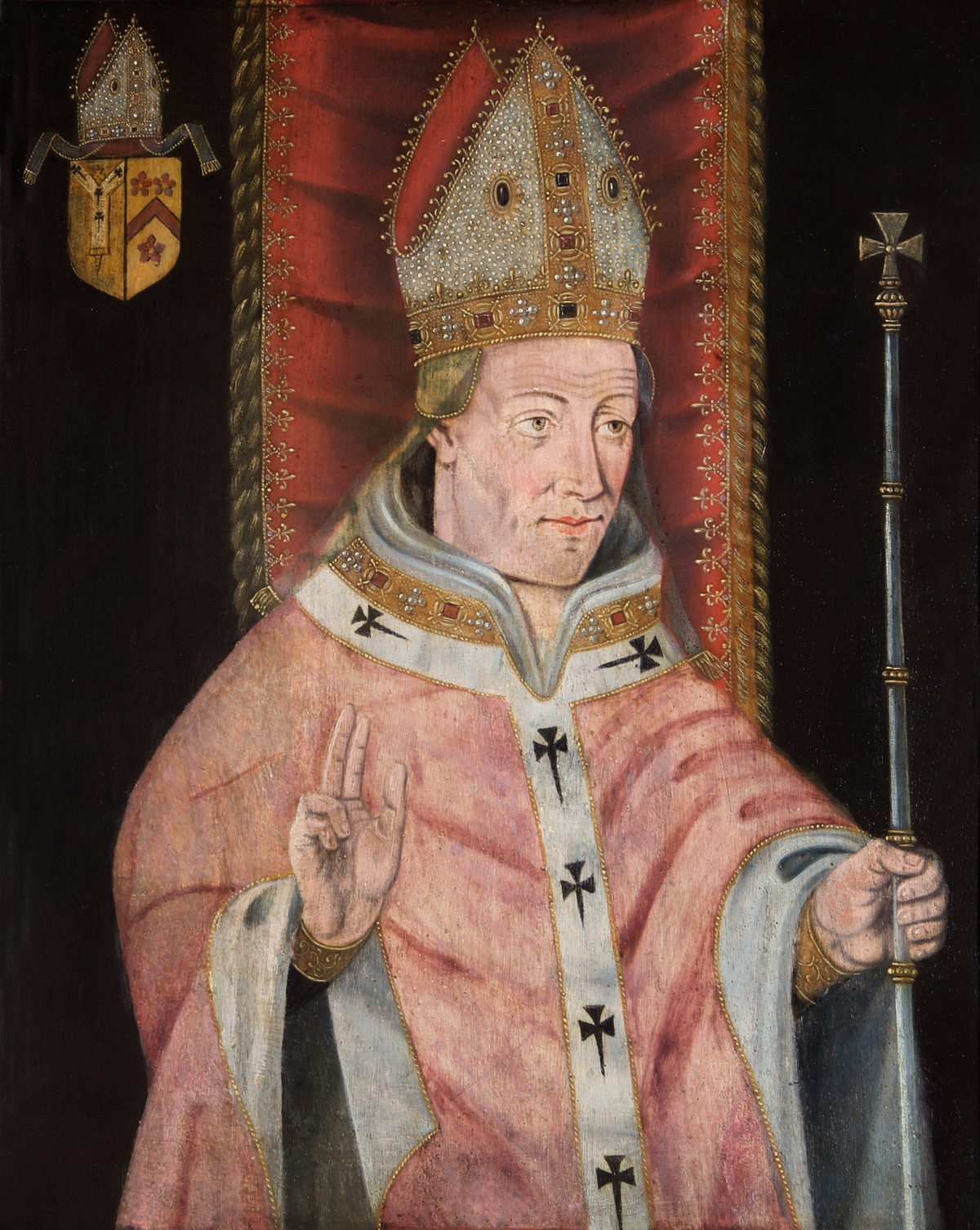
Portrait of Henry Chichele as Archbishop of Canterbury, with a heraldic shield showing the arms of Chichele impaling the arms of the See of Canterbury

Chichele and the other envoys were received on their return as saviours of the world; though the result was summed up by a contemporary as trischism instead of schism, and the Church as giving three husbands instead of two. Chichele now became the subject of a leading case, the court of kings bench deciding, after arguments reheard in three successive terms, that he could not hold his previous benefices with the bishopric, and that, spite of the maxim Papa potest omnia, a papal bull could not supersede the law of the land (Year-book ii. H. iv. 37, 59, 79). Accordingly, he had to resign livings and canonries (28 April 1410). As, however, he had obtained a bull (20 August 1409) enabling him to appoint his successors to the vacated preferments, including his nephew William, though still an undergraduate and not in orders, to the chancellorship of Salisbury, and a prebend at Lichfield, he did not go empty away. In May 1410 he went again on an embassy to France; on 11 September 1411 he headed a mission to discuss Henry V's marriage with a daughter of the duke of Burgundy; and he was again there in November.

In the interval Chichele found time to visit his diocese for the first time and be enthroned at St Davids on 11 May 1411. He was with the English force under the earl of Arundel which accompanied the duke of Burgundy to Paris in October 1411 and there defeated the Armagnacs, an exploit which revealed to England the weakness of the French. On 30 November 1411 Chichele, with two other bishops and three earls and the prince of Wales, knelt to the king to receive public thanks for their administration. That he was in high favour with Henry V is shown by his being sent with Richard de Beauchamp, 13th Earl of Warwick (1382–1439) to France in July 1413 to conclude peace. Immediately after the death of Thomas Arundel Archbishop of Canterbury the king recommended him to the pope for promotion to the archbishopric on 13 March 1414, signified his royal assent of Chichele's postulation on 23 March 1414, translated by papal bull on 28 April 1414, and received the pall without going to Rome for it on 24 July.

These dates are important as they help to save Chichele from the charge, versified by Shakespeare (Henry V. act 1. sc. 2) from Hall's Chronicle, of having tempted Henry V into the conquest of France for the sake of diverting parliament from the disendowment of the Church. There is no contemporary authority for the charge, which seems to appear first in Redman's rhetorical history of Henry V, written in 1540 with an eye to the political situation at that time, As a matter of fact, the parliament at Leicester, in which the speeches were supposed to have been made, began on 30 April 1414 before Chichele was archbishop. The rolls of parliament show that he was not present in the parliament at all. Moreover, parliament was so far from pressing disendowment that on the petition of the House of Commons it passed a savage act against the heresies commonly called Lollardy which aimed at the destruction of the king and all temporal estates, making Lollards felons and ordering every justice of the peace to hunt down their schools, conventicles, congregations and confederacies.

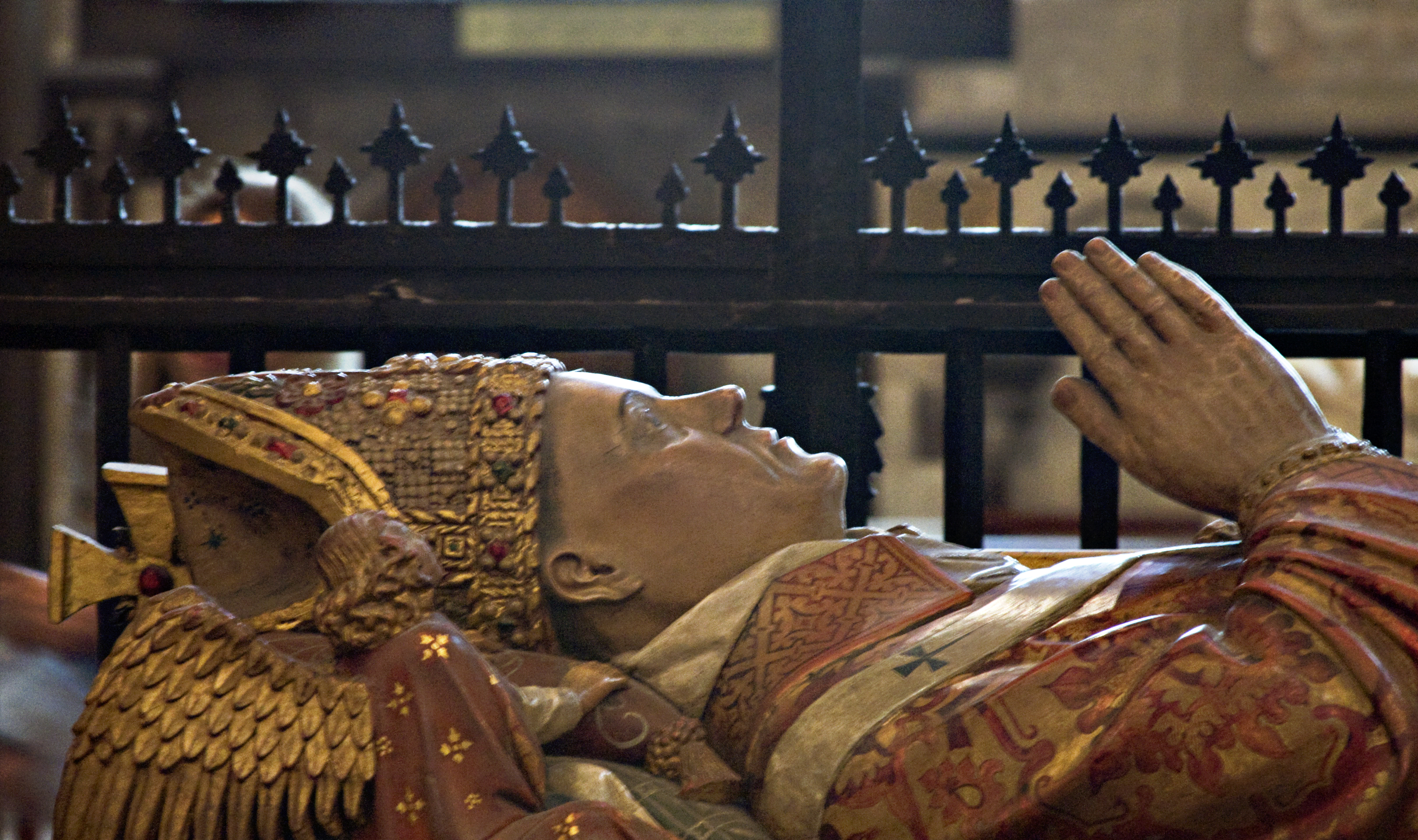
Henry's tomb effigy

=== Later career ===
In his capacity of archbishop, Chichele remained what he had always been chiefly, the lawyer and diplomatist. He was present at the siege of Rouen, and the king committed to him personally the negotiations for the surrender of the city in January 1419 and for the marriage of Katherine. He crowned Katherine at Westminster (20 February 1421), and on 6 December baptised her child Henry VI. He was a persecutor of heretics. No one could have attained or kept the position of archbishop at the time without being so. He presided at the trial of John Claydon, skinner and citizen of London, who after five years imprisonment at various times had made public abjuration before the late archbishop, Arundel, but now was found in possession of a book in English called The Lanterne of Light, which contained the heresy that the principal cause of the persecution of Christians was the illegal retention by priests of the goods of this world, and that archbishops and bishops were the special seats of Antichrist. As a relapsed heretic, he was left to the secular arm by Chichele, which resulted in burning at Smithfield.

On 1 July 1416 Chichele directed a half-yearly inquisition by archdeacons to hunt out heretics. On 12 February 1420 proceedings were begun before him against William Taylor, priest, who had been excommunicated 14 years earlier for heresy. Though Chichele absolved Taylor of the charges, Taylor was brought before him again on 11 February 1423 for saying that prayers ought not to be addressed to saints, but only to God. This time, he was found guilty of heresy by Bishop Chichele and executed by burning . A striking contrast was exhibited in October 1424, when a Stamford friar, John Russell, who had preached that any religious potest concumbere cum muliere and not mortally sin, was sentenced only to retract his doctrine.

In 1422, in Higham Ferrers, he established a college called Chichele College for secular canons. The College had provision for 8 priests, 4 clerks, 6 choristers and a song and grammar master.

Further persecutions of a number of Lollards took place in 1428. The records of convocation in Chichele's time are a curious mixture of persecutions for heresy, which largely consisted in attacks on clerical endowments, with negotiations with the ministers of the crown for the object of cutting down to the lowest level the clerical contributions to the public revenues in respect of their endowments. Chichele was tenacious of the privileges of his see, and this involved him in a constant struggle with Henry Beaufort, bishop of Winchester. In 1418, while Henry V was alive, he successfully protested against Beaufort's being made a cardinal and legate a latere to supersede the legatine jurisdiction of Canterbury. But during the regency, after Henry VI's accession, Beaufort was successful, and in 1426 became cardinal and legate.

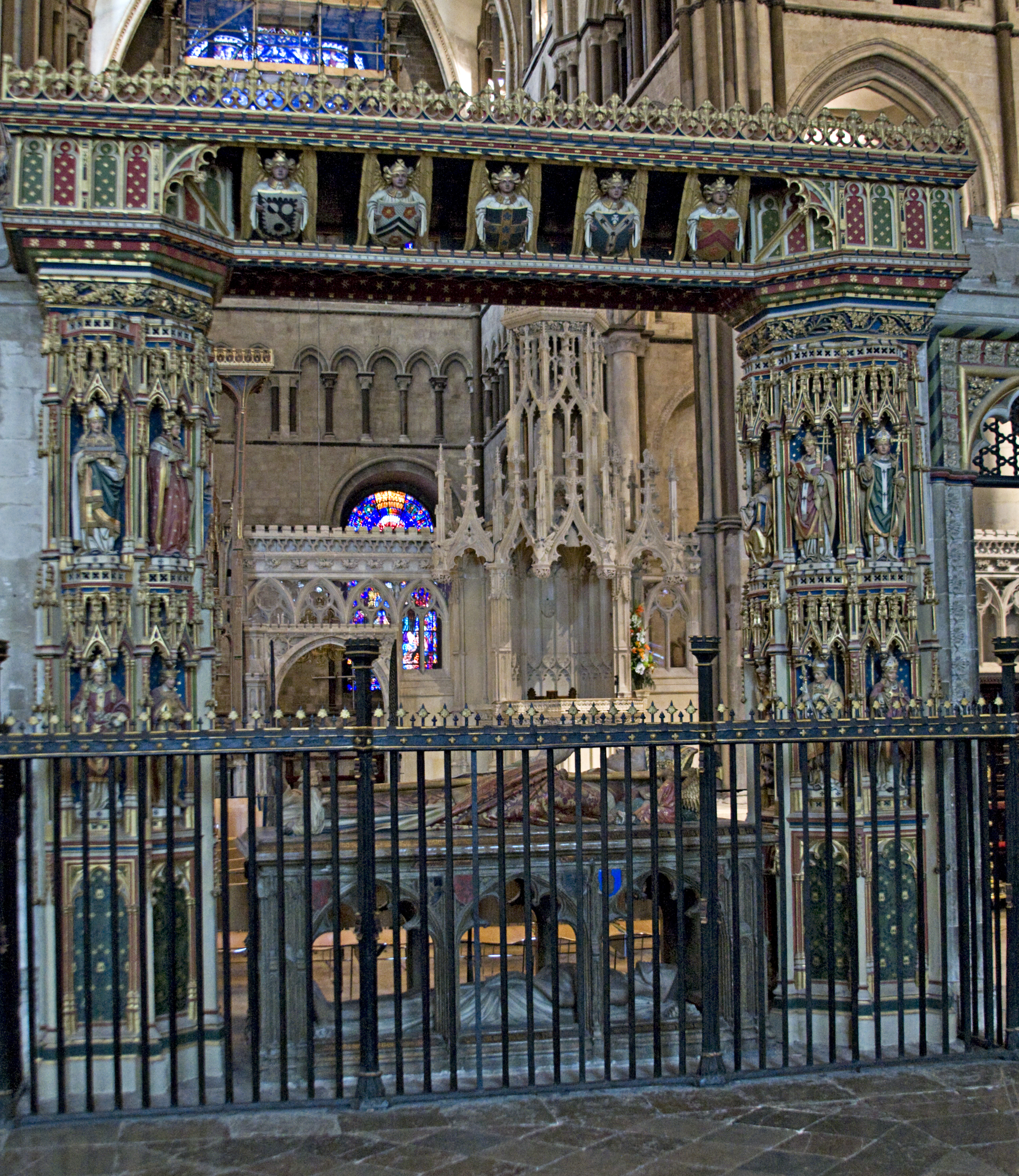
Railings ("the Chichele gate") at his tomb in Canterbury Cathedral

== Relations with the papacy ==
This brought Chichele into collision with Martin V. The struggle between them has been represented as one of a patriotic archbishop resisting the encroachments of the papacy on the Church of England. In point of fact it was almost wholly personal, and was rather an incident in the rivalry between the Duke of Gloucester and his half-uncle, Cardinal Beaufort, than one involving any principle. Chichele, by appointing a jubilee to be held at Canterbury in 1420, after the manner of the Jubilee ordained by the Popes, threatened to divert the profits from pilgrims from Rome to Canterbury. A ferocious letter from the pope to the papal nuncios, on 19 March 1423, denounced the proceeding as calculated to ensnare simple souls and extort from them a profane reward, thereby setting up themselves against the apostolic see and the Roman pontiff, to whom alone so great a faculty has been granted by God (Cat. Pap. Reg. vii. 12). Chichele also incurred the papal wrath by opposing the system of papal provision which diverted patronage from English to Italian hands, but the immediate occasion was to prevent the introduction of the bulls making Beaufort a cardinal. Chichele had been careful enough to obtain Papal provisions for himself, his pluralities, his bishopric and archbishopric.

== Educational foundations ==
In addition to his accomplishments as an archbishop and statesman, Chichele is remembered for his educational foundations. He endowed a "hutch" (chest or loan-fund) for poor scholars at New College, and another for the University of Oxford at large. He founded three colleges: two at Oxford, one at Higham Ferrers. His first college at Oxford was St Bernard's College, founded by Chichele under licence in mortmain in 1437 for Cistercian monks, on the model of Gloucester Hall and Durham College for the southern and northern Benedictines. Nothing more than a site and building was required by way of endowment, as the young monks, who were sent there to study under a provisor, were supported by the houses of the order to which they belonged. The site was five acres, and the building is described in the letters patent "as a fitting and noble college mansion in honour of the most glorious Virgin Mary and St Bernard in Northgates Street outside the Northgate of Oxford." It was suppressed with the Cistercian abbeys in 1540, and, on 11 December 1546, granted to Christ Church, Oxford, which sold it to Thomas White in 1554 for St John's College, Oxford.

The college at Higham Ferrers was a much earlier design. On 2 May 1422, Henry V granted for 300 marks (£200) licence to found, on three acres at Higham Ferrers, a perpetual college of eight chaplains and four clerks, of whom one was to teach grammar and the other song. A papal bull having also been obtained, the archbishop, in the course of a visitation of Lincoln diocese, executed his letters patent founding the college, dedicating it to the Virgin Mary, St Thomas à Becket and St Edward the Confessor, and handed over the buildings to its members, the vicar of Higham Ferrers being made the first master or warden. He further endowed it in 1434 with lands in Bedfordshire and Huntingdonshire, and his brothers, William and Robert, gave some houses in London in 1427 and 1438. The foundation was closely modelled on Winchester College, with its warden and fellows, its grammar and song schoolmasters, but a step in advance was made by the masters being made fellows and so members of the governing body. Attached was also a bede or almshouse for twelve poor men. Both school and almshouse had existed before, and this was merely an additional endowment. The endowment was in 1535 worth some £200 a year, about a fifth of that of Winchester College. The college at Higham Ferrers fell with other colleges not part of the universities. On 18 July 1542 it was surrendered to Henry VIII, and its possessions granted to Robert Dacres on condition of maintaining the grammar school and paying the master £10 a year, the same salary as the headmasters of Winchester and Eton, and maintaining the almshouse.

All Souls College, Oxford was considerably later. The patent for it, dated 20 May 1438, is for a warden and 20 scholars. A papal bull for the college was obtained on 21 June 1439, and further patents for endowments from May 1441 to January 1443. Early in 1443, not long before his death, Chichele opened the college.

== Death ==
Chichele died on 12 April 1443. He is buried in Canterbury Cathedral, in a "cadaver tomb" between the upper choir and the choir ambulatory, adjacent to the north-east transept. The neighbouring gateway, from the transept into the choir, is known as the "Chichele Gate". His elaborate and colourful tomb, built years before his death, depicts his naked corpse on the lower level, while on the upper level he is depicted resplendent in archiepiscopal vesture, his palms together in prayer. "I was pauper-born," reads the inscription on his tomb, "then to primate raised. Now I am cut down and served up for worms. Behold my grave."

== See also ==
- Chichele Lectures
- Chichele Professorship

== Citations ==
Catholic Church titles
Preceded by Guy Mone	Bishop of Saint David's; 1407–1414	Succeeded by John Catterick
Preceded by Thomas Arundel	Archbishop of Canterbury; 1414–1443	Succeeded by John Stafford
