= Thomas Langley =

English bishop and official (c.1363–1437)

- Bishop of Durham
- Appointed: 14 May 1406
- Installed: 4 September 1406
- Term ended: 20 November 1437
- Predecessor: Walter Skirlaw
- Successor: Robert Neville
- Other posts: Lord Chancellor; Bishop-elect of London; Archbishop-elect of York
- Previous posts: Lord Privy Seal; Dean of York

Orders
- Consecration: 8 August 1406

Personal details
- Born: c. 1363 Middleton, Lancashire
- Died: 20 November 1437 (aged approximately 74) Bishop Auckland, County Durham
- Buried: Durham Cathedral
- Denomination: Roman Catholic
- Parents: William and Alice Langley

Thomas Langley (c. 1363 – 20 November 1437) was an English prelate who held high ecclesiastical and political offices in the early to mid-15th century. He was Dean of York, Bishop of Durham, twice Lord Chancellor of England to three kings, and a Pseudocardinal. In turn Keeper of the King's signet and Keeper of the Privy Seal before becoming de facto England's first Foreign Secretary. He was the second longest serving Chancellor of the Middle Ages.

== Life ==
Langley was born around 1363 in Middleton, Lancashire, the third son of Alice and William Langley. In 1375 he was sent to St Mary's Abbey, Thetford, a feeder for Corpus Christi in Cambridge. Langley attended this college until it was ransacked and destroyed by poll tax rioters on 15 June 1381.

Langley returned to Middleton and in 1385 he was appointed rector of Radcliffe and collated as Archdeacon of Norfolk in 1399. In 1401 he was appointed Dean of York, but the appointment was blocked by Pope Boniface IX because of Langley's part in the deposition of Richard II. In 1401 he was given custody of the privy seal, which office he held until 1405.

Langley's alterations to the Galilee Chapel

In October 1404, Langley was elected Bishop of London but the new Pope, Innocent VII, refused to allow his installation and on 2 March 1405 he was appointed Chancellor for the first time. From then on until his semi-retirement in 1430, Langley spent 5,670 days in the service of the crown. He now lived in an inn in Holborn in the City of London. Within 20 days Richard Scrope, Archbishop of York, rebelled; was captured and executed after a show trial. Langley was elected in August 1405 as Archbishop, which the Pope again disapproved of and excommunicated Langley and King Henry IV. The election was quashed in May 1406.

The excommunication was lifted the following year and Langley was installed as Bishop of Durham in St Paul's Cathedral in 1406. In 1407 he resigned his Chancellorship.

Langley was created a pseudocardinal in the consistory of 6 June 1411 by Antipope John XXIII, an honour Langley refused. In 1412, in his first visit to his birthplace since 1385, he completed an early rebuilding of Middleton Parish Church, adding a new wooden tower and a chantry for use as a school for local children, and reconsecrating and rededicated it to St Leonard, in 1412. The same year he also founded a school related to the church (later known as Middleton Grammar School and Queen Elizabeth's Senior High School). He also founded Durham School.

In 1413, Henry IV died in Westminster Abbey, his executor Langley at his side. During the reign of his successor Henry V, he spent three-quarters of his time in the service of the crown – a politician first and churchman second – and at Windsor on 28 September 1422, as Chancellor, he delivered up the gold seal of England in a purse of white leather to his infant sovereign Henry VI (Thomas Rymer's Foedera, vol. x. fol. 253). He returned to Middleton for the last time in 1424.

From 1430 until his death Langley attended to his diocese, something he had, by his own admission, neglected, continuing with various diplomatic work when called upon by the government. He made major alterations to the west end of Durham Cathedral, blocking the Great West Door with an altar and his own tomb, thus necessitating the construction of the two lateral doors to north and south, and the great buttresses on the outside of the west walls, which prevent the building from slipping into the river (for Hugh de Puiset's architect could not be bothered with foundations and sank the base of his pillars hardly more than a foot or two below the ground).

== Citations ==
Political offices
Preceded by Richard Clifford	Lord Privy Seal; 1401–1405	Succeeded by Nicholas Bubwith
Preceded by Henry Beaufort	Lord Chancellor; 1405–1407	Succeeded by Thomas Arundel
Preceded by Henry Beaufort	Lord Chancellor; 1417–1424	Succeeded by Henry Beaufort
Catholic Church titles
Preceded by Walter Skirlaw	Bishop of Durham; 1406–1437	Succeeded by Robert Neville
Preceded by Robert Braybrooke as bishop	Bishop-elect of London; 1404	Succeeded by Roger Walden as bishop
Preceded by Richard le Scrope as archbishop	Archbishop-elect of York; 1405–1406	Succeeded by Robert Hallam as archbishop
