= John de Welyngton =

Prior of Llanthony Priory

- Prior of Llanthony Priory
- Elected: c. 1395
- Term ended: c. 1407
- Predecessor: John Yatton
- Successor: William Cromp

John de Welyngton (also Wellyngton, Wellynton, Welynton, Wellington) was prior of Llanthony Priory from c. 1395 to c. 1407.

In his youth he was involved in an attack on Llanthony prior Nicholas de Trinbey. Nicholas was blinded, and his brother killed. In later life his enemies accused him of being a follower of Welsh rebel Owain Glyndŵr.

== Early life ==
A John Welyngton was ordained as an acolyte on 31 May 1371 at Leominster Church in Herefordshire.

On or around 4 August 1373 Nicholas de Trinbey and his brother John were attacked by de Welyngton and two other canons of Llanthony while Nicholas was saying the Office of the Dead. John de Trinbey was killed and Nicholas was thrown to the ground and his eyes torn out.

John de Welyngton had accused Nicholas of injuring him and having "wasted the goods of the priory". He was excommunicated for the attack, but in 1391 received a papal pardon after travelling to the Holy See, then at Avignon, for absolution. The pardon described the attack as a youthful mistake.

== Prior of Llanthony ==
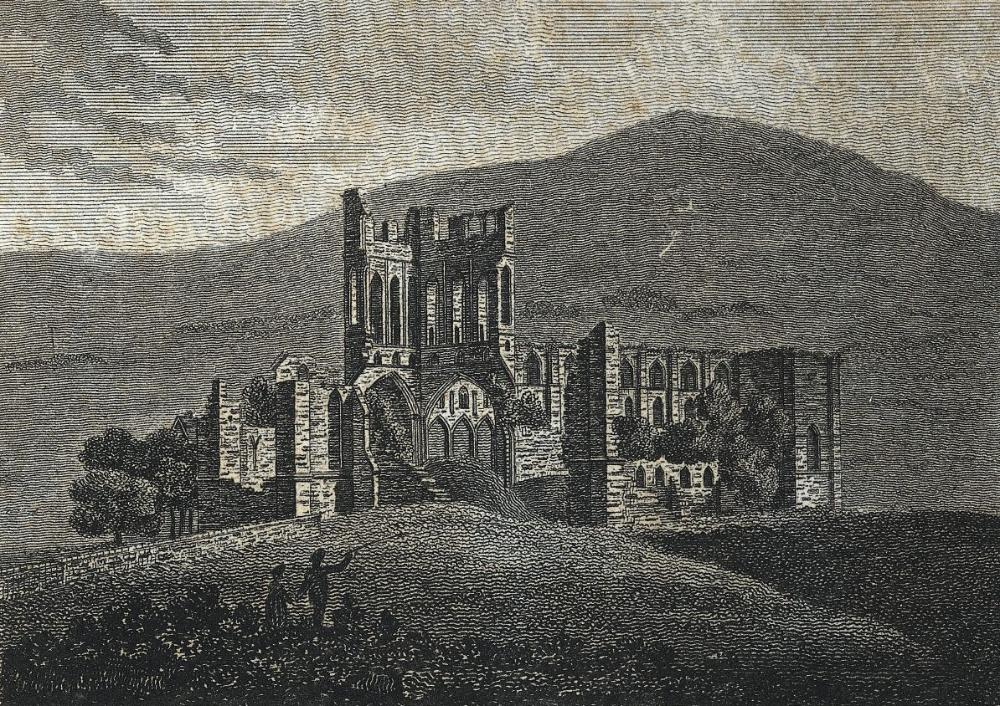
c. 1810 drawing of Llanthony Priory

He is first recorded as prior on 15 July 1395, and last in 1407. His successor is first recorded on 19 August 1409, so he must have resigned or died in office before then.

The priory of Llanthony held lands and possessions in Ireland, and he nominated individuals to serve as his authorised representatives there. In 1396 he nominated Adam Elmeley, his canon, and Hugh de Ewyas for two years. In 1399 he nominated Elmeley and William Hamelyn for three years. In 1400, he again nominated Elmeley and Philip White of Hulleton for two years.

In 1400, the royal recognition of Llanthony's rights to two Irish churches, secured by John's predecessor in 1391, was confirmed by Henry IV on payment of five marks.

With the permission of the king he travelled to Ireland in 1402. In his absence he nominated Hugh Harper, his chaplain, and William Harper to serve as his authorised representatives in England for one year.

On 24 October 1402 he was granted permission by Guy Mone, bishop of St Davids, to have ordained three canons of Llanthony, including William Cromp. On the same day Mone charged him and two others with investigating accusations of perjury against two brothers.

In 1404 his enemies accused him of being a "rebel and adherent" of Owain Glyndŵr and some of his Irish lands were seized by the king's officers. On 8 November, after he complained of this seizure, the king issued a notice to "all officers in Ireland" that he was considered a loyal subject.
