= William Cromp =

Prior of Llanthony Priory

- Prior of Llanthony Priory
- Elected: 19 August 1409
- Term ended: c. 1417
- Predecessor: John de Welyngton
- Successor: Unknown

William Cromp (also Crompe) was prior of Llanthony Priory from 1409. He was last recorded as prior at Easter 1417.

== Llanthony Priory ==
Permission was granted by Guy Mone, bishop of St Davids, to ordain William and two other canons of Llanthony Priory on 24 October 1402.

After an unexplained vacancy, he was elected prior on 19 August 1409. He was last recorded as prior at Easter 1417. His successor is unknown.
