= Richard Clifford =

15th-century Bishop of Bath and Wells, Worcester, and London

- Bishop of London
- Archdiocese: Province of Canterbury
- Appointed: 22 June 1407
- Term ended: 20 August 1421
- Predecessor: Nicholas Bubwith
- Successor: John Kemp
- Previous posts: Bishop-elect of Bath and Wells; Bishop of Worcester

Orders
- Consecration: 9 October 1401

Personal details
- Died: 20 August 1421
- Denomination: Roman Catholic

Richard Clifford (died 1421) was a Bishop of London who had previously been Bishop of Worcester, Bishop-elect of Bath and Wells, and Lord Privy Seal.

Clifford's brother was the politician Robert Clifford, who was member of parliament (MP) first for Northumberland and later for Kent.

Clifford was appointed Lord Privy Seal on 14 November 1397 and resigned on 4 November 1401. He was Keeper of the Great Wardrobe from 1390 to 1398.

Clifford was elected to the see of Bath and Wells on 12 May 1400, but not consecrated, as he was instead translated to the see of Worcester. Clifford was elected to the see of Worcester on 19 August 1401 and consecrated on 9 October 1401.

Clifford was translated to the see of London on 22 June 1407. He planned to found a college of the University of Oxford which he intended to name London College. However, he died on 20 August 1421 and his plan did not survive him.

== Citations ==
Political offices
Preceded by Guy Mone	Lord Privy Seal; 1397–1401	Succeeded by Thomas Langley
Catholic Church titles
Preceded by Ralph Ergham	Bishop of Bath and Wells; 1400–1401	Succeeded by Henry Bowet
Preceded by Robert Tideman of Winchcombe	Bishop of Worcester; 1401–1407	Succeeded by Thomas Peverel
Preceded by Nicholas Bubwith	Bishop of London; 1407–1421	Succeeded by John Kemp
