= Nicholas Carew (Lord Privy Seal) =

Member of the Parliament of England

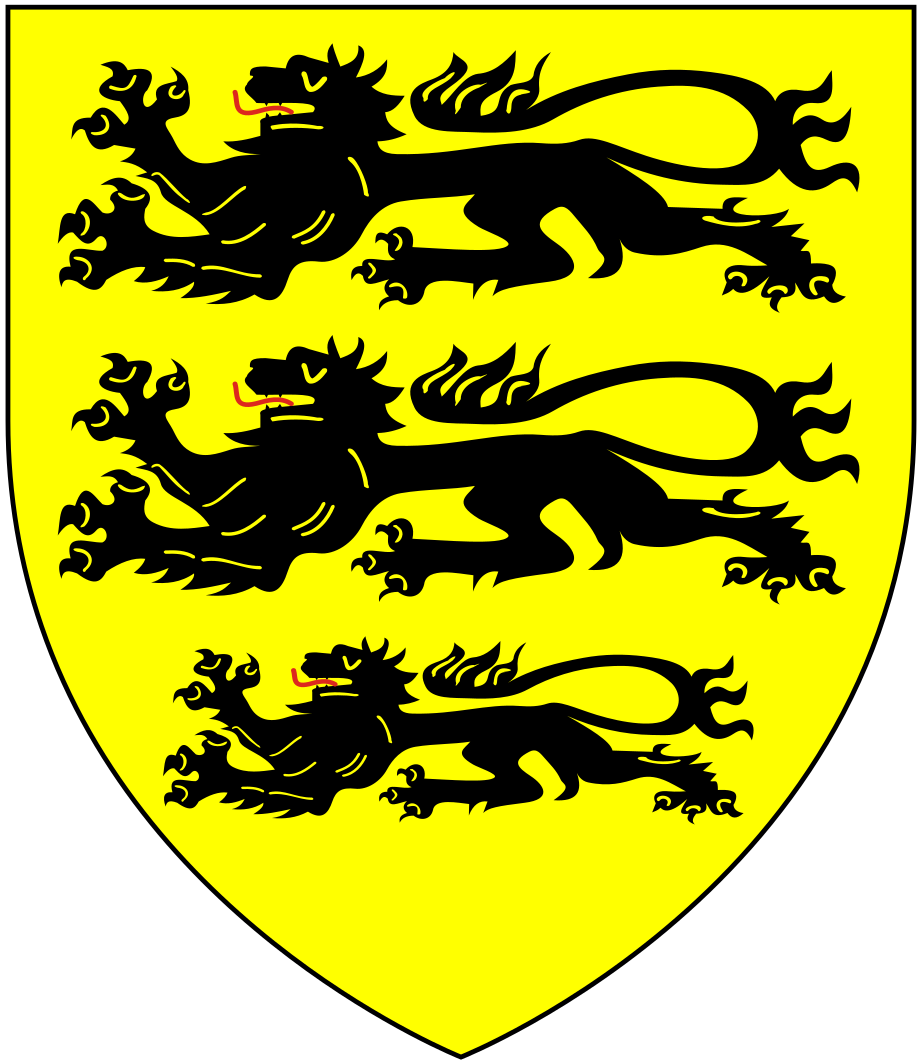
Arms of Carew: Or, three lions passant in pale sable

Nicholas Carew (died 1390), of Beddington in Surrey, was an English lawyer, landowner, courtier, administrator and politician who served as Keeper of the Privy Seal during the reign of King Edward III.

== Origins ==
Traditional sources make him a son of Nicholas Carew, who married twice and died in 1308, but this is improbable and he was more likely a grandson.

== Career ==
Not being heir to any significant property, he likely trained as a lawyer, working for private clients and for the crown. By 1342 he had been granted the manor of Banstead in Surrey for life and to this he added holdings in Kent. Three major clients were Sir Richard Willoughby of Beddington, his daughter and heiress Lucy, and her first husband Sir Thomas Huscarle, an MP who was lord of the manor of Purley Magna in Berkshire and died by 1352. By 1356 Carew had married the widow, gaining control of her lands in Surrey and Berkshire, and made her manor of Beddington, which her father had bought in 1345, the family home.

In 1360 he was chosen to sit for Surrey in Parliament and he became a trusted member of the Royal Household. In 1371 he was appointed Keeper of the Privy Seal, the first layman to hold the post, and remained in office until the king's death in 1377. He was one of the group of courtiers around Edward III, including William, Lord Latimer, Lord John Neville, Sir Alan Buxhull, Richard Lyons, and the king's mistress Alice Perrers, who increasingly controlled access to and decisions emerging from the king as his health failed. Influential in the royal campaign in 1376 against William Wykeham, Bishop of Winchester, he was named as an executor and trustee of the king's will.

After the king's death, he sat again for Surrey in the Parliament of October 1377. Alice Perrers asked him to help refute the allegations against her but when she went on trial in December the court heard his view that it was she who induced the senile king to pardon Richard Lyons from his conviction for financial malpractice.

Thereafter he seemed to have withdrawn from public life, dying on 17 August 1390. In his will, made at Beddington on 13 October 1387 and proved at Croydon on 26 September 1390, he asked to be buried in the church of St Mary at Beddington next to his brother John, a priest. Despite being a county member in Parliament and a senior member of government, he does not appear to have been knighted.

== Family ==
Sometime after 1352 he married Lucy, widow of Sir Thomas Huscarle and daughter and heiress of Sir Richard Willoughby of Beddington and his wife Elizabeth. Children mentioned in his will were:

- Nicholas, his heir.
- Margaret, who married Sir Robert Turberville (died 1424), of Bere Regis in Dorset.
- Lucy, who became a nun at Rusper in Sussex.

Political offices
Preceded by Peter Lacy	Lord Privy Seal; 1371–1377	Succeeded by John Fordham

Parliament of England
Preceded by	Member of Parliament for Surrey; 1360	Succeeded by
Parliament of England
Preceded by	Member of Parliament for Surrey; October 1377	Succeeded by John I Hathersham
