= Lord Privy Seal =

Sinecure office of state in the UK

United Kingdom Lord Keeper of the Privy Seal
- Royal Arms of His Majesty's Government

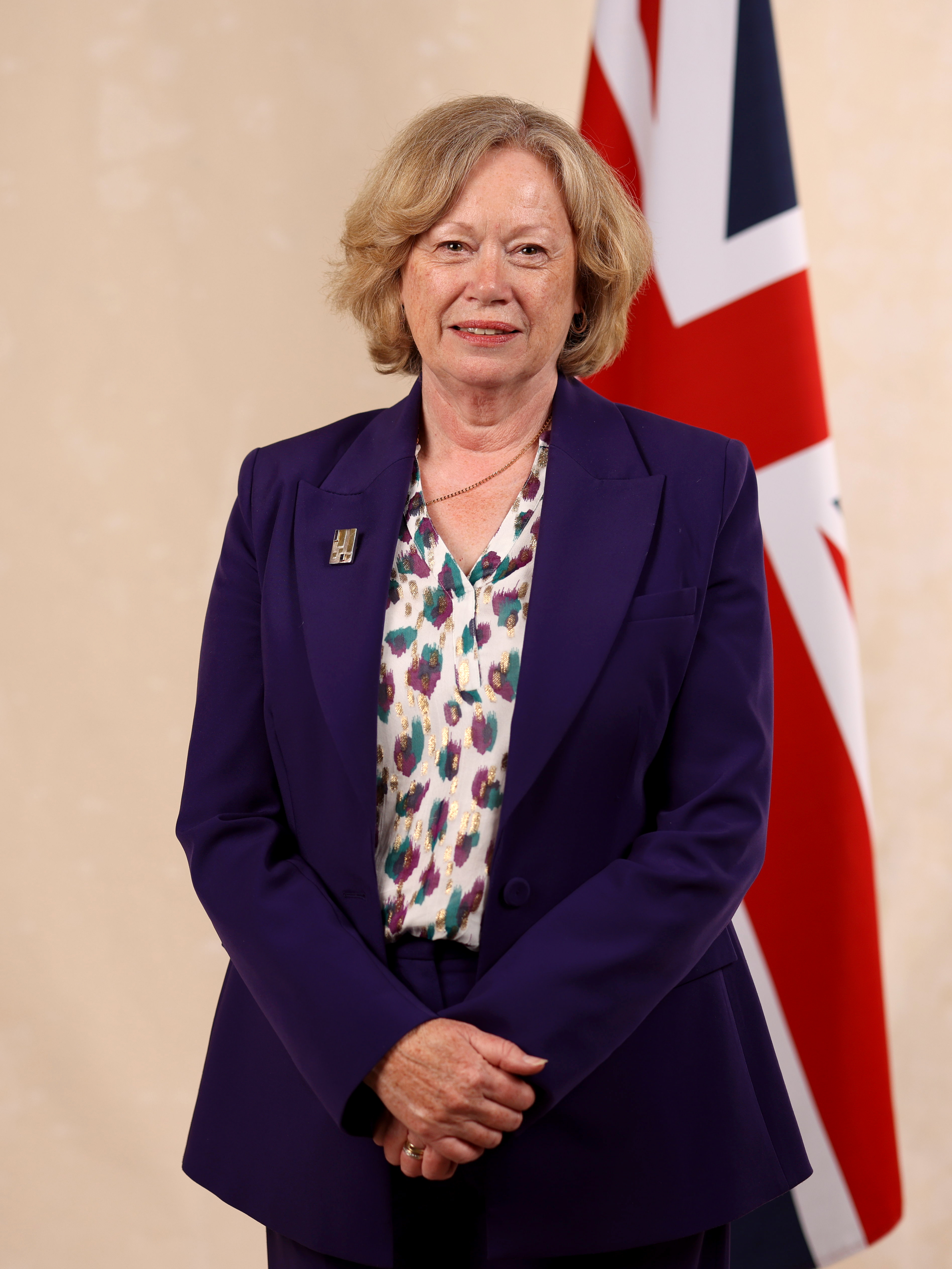
- Incumbent; Angela Smith, Baroness Smith of Basildon since 5 July 2024
- Style: The Right Honourable
- Type: Great Officer of State
- Appointer: The King (on the advice of the Prime Minister)
- Term length: At His Majesty's pleasure
- Formation: 1307
- First holder: William Melton

The lord privy seal (or, more formally, the lord keeper of the privy seal) is the fifth of the Great Officers of State in the United Kingdom, ranking beneath the lord president of the Council and above the lord great chamberlain. Originally, its holder was responsible for the monarch's personal (privy) seal (as opposed to the Great Seal of the Realm, which is in the care of the lord chancellor) until the use of such a seal became obsolete. Though one of the oldest offices in European governments, it has no particular function today because the use of a privy seal has been obsolete for centuries; it may be regarded as a traditional sinecure, but today, the holder of the office is invariably given a seat in the Cabinet of the United Kingdom, and is sometimes referred to as a minister without portfolio.

Since the premiership of Clement Attlee, the position of lord privy seal has frequently been combined with that of leader of the House of Lords or leader of the House of Commons. The office of lord privy seal, unlike those of leader of the Lords or Commons, is eligible for a ministerial salary under the Ministerial and Other Salaries Act 1975. The office does not confer membership of the House of Lords, leading to Ernest Bevin's remark on holding this office that he was "neither a Lord, nor a Privy, nor a Seal".

During the reign of Edward I, prior to 1307, the privy seal was kept by the controller of the wardrobe. During the time that the Court of Requests existed, the lord privy seal was its president.

== List of lord keepers of the privy seal ==
=== Lord keepers of the privy seal (c. 1307–1714) ===
Lord Keeper of the Privy Seal
Lord Keeper	Term of office		Monarch (Reign)
William Melton	1307	1312	Edward II r. 1307–1327
Roger Northburgh	1312	1316	Edward II r. 1307–1327
Thomas Charlton	1316	1320	Edward II r. 1307–1327
Robert Baldock; Archdeacon of Middlesex	1320	1323	Edward II r. 1307–1327
Robert Wodehouse	1323	1323	Edward II r. 1307–1327
Robert Ayleston	1323	1324	Edward II r. 1307–1327
William Ayermin	1324	1325	Edward II r. 1307–1327
Henry de Cliff	1325	1325	Edward II r. 1307–1327
William Herlaston	1325	1326	Edward II r. 1307–1327
Robert Wyvil	1326	1327	Edward II r. 1307–1327
Richard Airmyn	1327	1328	Edward III r. 1327–1377
Adam de Lymbergh	1328	1329	Edward III r. 1327–1377
Richard Bury; Bishop of Durham	1329	1334	Edward III r. 1327–1377
Robert Ayleston	1334	1334	Edward III r. 1327–1377
Robert Tawton	1334	1335	Edward III r. 1327–1377
William de la Zouch	1335	1337	Edward III r. 1327–1377
Richard Bintworth	1337	1338	Edward III r. 1327–1377
William Kilsby	1338	1342	Edward III r. 1327–1377
John de Ufford	1342	1344	Edward III r. 1327–1377
Thomas Hatfield	1344	1345	Edward III r. 1327–1377
John Thoresby; Master of the Rolls	1345	1347	Edward III r. 1327–1377
Simon Islip; Archbishop of Canterbury	1347	1350	Edward III r. 1327–1377
Michael Northburgh; Archdeacon of Suffolk	1350	1354	Edward III r. 1327–1377
Thomas Bramber	1354	1355	Edward III r. 1327–1377
John Winwick	1355	1360	Edward III r. 1327–1377
John Buckingham; Bishop of Lincoln	1360	1363	Edward III r. 1327–1377
William of Wykeham; Archdeacon of Lincoln	1363	1367	Edward III r. 1327–1377
Peter Lacy	1367	1371	Edward III r. 1327–1377
Nicholas Carew; MP for Surrey	1371	1377	Edward III r. 1327–1377
John Fordham	1377	1381	Richard II r. 1377–1399
William Dighton	1381	1382	Richard II r. 1377–1399
Walter Skirclaw; Bishop of Coventry and Lichfield	1382	1386	Richard II r. 1377–1399
John Waltham; Bishop of Salisbury	1386	1389	Richard II r. 1377–1399
Edmund Stafford; Bishop of Exeter	1389	1396	Richard II r. 1377–1399
Guy Mone	1396	1397	Richard II r. 1377–1399
Richard Clifford; Bishop of Bath and Wells	1397	1401	Richard II r. 1377–1399
Richard Clifford; Bishop of Bath and Wells	1397	1401	Henry IV r. 1399–1413
Thomas Langley	1401	1405	Henry IV r. 1399–1413
Nicholas Bubwith	1405	1406	Henry IV r. 1399–1413
John Prophet; Dean of York	1406	1415	Henry IV r. 1399–1413
John Prophet; Dean of York	1406	1415	Henry V r. 1413–1422
John Wakering; Bishop of Norwich	1415	1416	Henry V r. 1413–1422
Henry Ware	1416	1418	Henry V r. 1413–1422
John Kemp; Bishop of Rochester	1418	1421	Henry V r. 1413–1422
John Stafford	1421	1422	Henry V r. 1413–1422
William Alnwick; Bishop of Norwich (Note: Archdeacon of Sarum until 1426; Bishop of Norwich from 1426)	1422	1432	Henry VI r. 1422–1461
William Lyndwood; Bishop of St David's (Note: Archdeacon of Oxford 1434–1442; Bishop of St David's from 1442)	1432	1443	Henry VI r. 1422–1461
Thomas Beckington; Bishop of Bath and Wells	1443	1444	Henry VI r. 1422–1461
Adam Moleyns; Bishop of Chichester (Note: Dean of Salisbury until 1446; Bishop of Chichester from 1446)	1444	1450	Henry VI r. 1422–1461
Andrew Holes; Archdeacon of York	1450	1452	Henry VI r. 1422–1461
Thomas Lisieux; Dean of St Paul's	1452	1456	Henry VI r. 1422–1461
Laurence Booth; Bishop of Durham (Note: Dean of St Paul's until 1457)	1456	1460	Henry VI r. 1422–1461
Robert Stillington; Bishop of Bath and Wells (Note: Archdeacon of Taunton until 1465; Bishop of Bath and Wells from 1466)	1460	1467	Henry VI r. 1422–1461
Robert Stillington; Bishop of Bath and Wells	1460	1467	Edward IV r. 1461–1470
Thomas Rotherham; Bishop of Rochester (Note: Bishop of Rochester from 1468)	1467	1470	Edward IV r. 1461–1470
John Hales; Bishop of Coventry and Lichfield	1470	1471	Henry VI r. 1470–1471
Thomas Rotherham; Bishop of Lincoln (Note: Bishop of Rochester until 1472; Bishop of Lincoln from 1472)	1471	1474	Edward IV r. 1471–1483
John Russell; Bishop of Lincoln (Note: Bishop of Rochester 1476–1480; Bishop of Lincoln from 1480)	1474	1483	Edward IV r. 1471–1483
John Russell; Bishop of Lincoln	1474	1483	Edward V r. 1483
John Gunthorpe; Dean of Wells	1483	1485	Edward V r. 1483
John Gunthorpe; Dean of Wells	1483	1485	Richard III r. 1483–1485
Peter Courtenay; Bishop of Exeter	1485	1487	Henry VII r. 1485–1509
Richard Foxe; Bishop of Winchester (Note: Bishop of Exeter until 1492; Bishop of Bath and Wells 1492–1494; Bishop of Durham 1494–1501; Bishop of Winchester from 1501)	1487	1516	Henry VII r. 1485–1509
Richard Foxe; Bishop of Winchester	1487	1516	Henry VIII r. 1509–1547
Thomas Ruthall; Bishop of Durham	1516	1523	Henry VIII r. 1509–1547
Henry Marney; 1st Baron Marney	1523	1523	Henry VIII r. 1509–1547
Cuthbert Tunstall; Bishop of London	1523	1530	Henry VIII r. 1509–1547
Thomas Boleyn; 1st Earl of Wiltshire	1530	1536	Henry VIII r. 1509–1547
Thomas Cromwell; 1st Earl of Essex (Note: Concurrently held the offices of Chancellor of the Exchequer from 1533, Secretary of State from 1534, and Lord Great Chamberlain in 1540)	1536	1540	Henry VIII r. 1509–1547
William FitzWilliam; 1st Earl of Southampton	1540	1542	Henry VIII r. 1509–1547
John Russell; 1st Earl of Bedford (Note: Baron Russell from 1539, created Earl of Bedford in 1551)	1542	1555	Henry VIII r. 1509–1547
John Russell; 1st Earl of Bedford	1542	1555	Edward VI r. 1547–1553
John Russell; 1st Earl of Bedford	1542	1555	Mary I r. 1553–1558
William Paget; 1st Baron Paget	1555	1558	Mary I r. 1553–1558
Nicholas Bacon	1558	1571	Elizabeth I r. 1558–1603
William Cecil; 1st Baron Burghley	1571	1572	Elizabeth I r. 1558–1603
William Howard; 1st Baron Howard of Effingham	1572	1573	Elizabeth I r. 1558–1603
Thomas Smith; MP for Essex	1573	1576	Elizabeth I r. 1558–1603
Francis Walsingham; MP for Surrey	1576	1590	Elizabeth I r. 1558–1603
William Cecil; 1st Baron Burghley	1590	1598	Elizabeth I r. 1558–1603
Robert Cecil; 1st Earl of Salisbury	1598	1608	Elizabeth I r. 1558–1603
Robert Cecil; 1st Earl of Salisbury	1598	1608	James I r. 1603–1625
Henry Howard; 1st Earl of Northampton	1608	1614	James I r. 1603–1625
Robert Carr; 1st Earl of Somerset	1614	1616	James I r. 1603–1625
Edward Somerset; 4th Earl of Worcester	1616	1625	James I r. 1603–1625
John Coke; MP for Cambridge University	1625	1628	Charles I r. 1625–1649
Robert Naunton	1628	1628	Charles I r. 1625–1649
Henry Montagu; 1st Earl of Manchester	1628	1642	Charles I r. 1625–1649
Lucius Cary; 2nd Viscount Falkland	1643	1643	Charles I r. 1625–1649
Edward Nicholas (Note: Concurrently held the office of Secretary of State)	1643	1644	Charles I r. 1625–1649
Henry Bourchier; 5th Earl of Bath	1644	1646 (Note: Appointed in the controversial Oxford Parliament, Bourchier is sometimes regarded as holding the office for life. However, during the Interregnum Bourchier was identified as a Delinquent by Parliamentarians and use of the Privy Seal ended. Until the Restoration of Charles II the Great Seal was the primary seal of government, for which the custody held in commission.)	Charles I r. 1625–1649
Interregnum vacant	1646	1661	Charles II Court in exile
John Robartes; 2nd Baron Robartes	1661	1673	Charles II r. 1660–1685
Arthur Annesley; 1st Earl of Anglesey	1673	1682	Charles II r. 1660–1685
George Savile; 1st Marquess of Halifax	1682	1685	Charles II r. 1660–1685
Henry Hyde; 2nd Earl of Clarendon	1685	1687	James II r. 1685–1688
Henry Arundell; 3rd Baron Arundell of Wardour	1687	1688	James II r. 1685–1688
George Savile; 1st Marquess of Halifax	1689	1690	Mary II r. 1689–1694 & William III r. 1689–1702
Thomas Herbert; 8th Earl of Pembroke	1692	1699	Mary II r. 1689–1694 & William III r. 1689–1702
John Lowther; 1st Viscount Lonsdale	1699	1700	Mary II r. 1689–1694 & William III r. 1689–1702
Ford Grey; 1st Earl of Tankerville	1700	1701	Mary II r. 1689–1694 & William III r. 1689–1702
John Sheffield; 1st Duke of Buckingham and Normanby (Note: Marquess of Normanby from 1694; created Duke of Buckingham and Normanby in 1703)	1702	1705	Anne r. 1702–1714
John Holles; 1st Duke of Newcastle upon Tyne	1705	1711	Anne r. 1702–1714
John Robinson; Bishop of Bristol	1711	1713	Anne r. 1702–1714
William Legge; 1st Earl of Dartmouth	1713	1714	Anne r. 1702–1714

=== Lord keepers of the privy seal (1714–present) ===
Lord Keeper of the Privy Seal
Lord Keeper	Term of office		Other ministerial portfolios held during tenure	Party	Ministry	Monarch (Reign)
Thomas Wharton; 1st Marquess of Wharton (Note: Earl of Wharton from 1706; created Marquess of Wharton in 1715)	23 September 1714	12 April 1715		Whig	Townshend	George I r. 1714–1727
In commission	12 April 1715	31 August 1715		—	Townshend	George I r. 1714–1727
Charles Spencer; 3rd Earl of Sunderland	31 August 1715	19 December 1716		—	Townshend	George I r. 1714–1727
Evelyn Pierrepont; 1st Duke of Kingston-upon-Hull	19 December 1716	6 February 1719		—	Townshend	George I r. 1714–1727
Evelyn Pierrepont; 1st Duke of Kingston-upon-Hull	19 December 1716	6 February 1719		—	Stanhope–Sunderland I	George I r. 1714–1727
Evelyn Pierrepont; 1st Duke of Kingston-upon-Hull	19 December 1716	6 February 1719		—	Stanhope–Sunderland II	George I r. 1714–1727
Henry Grey; 1st Duke of Kent	6 February 1719	11 June 1720		—	Stanhope–Sunderland II	George I r. 1714–1727
Evelyn Pierrepont; 1st Duke of Kingston-upon-Hull	11 June 1720	11 March 1726		—	Stanhope–Sunderland II	George I r. 1714–1727
Evelyn Pierrepont; 1st Duke of Kingston-upon-Hull	11 June 1720	11 March 1726		—	Walpole–Townshend	George I r. 1714–1727
Thomas Trevor; 1st Baron Trevor	11 March 1726	8 May 1730		—	Walpole–Townshend	George I r. 1714–1727
Thomas Trevor; 1st Baron Trevor	11 March 1726	8 May 1730		—	Walpole–Townshend	George II r. 1727–1760
Spencer Compton; 1st Earl of Wilmington	8 May 1730	January; 1731		Whig	Walpole	George II r. 1727–1760
William Cavendish; 3rd Duke of Devonshire	12 January 1731	5 May 1733		Whig	Walpole	George II r. 1727–1760
Henry Lowther; 3rd Viscount Lonsdale	5 May 1733	16 May 1735		—	Walpole	George II r. 1727–1760
Francis Godolphin; 2nd Earl of Godolphin	16 May 1735	7 April 1740		—	Walpole	George II r. 1727–1760
John Hervey; 2nd Baron Hervey	7 April 1740	13 July 1742		—	Walpole	George II r. 1727–1760
John Leveson-Gower; 2nd Baron Gower	13 July 1742	10 December 1743		Tory	Carteret	George II r. 1727–1760
George Cholmondeley; 3rd Earl of Cholmondeley	10 December 1743	27 December 1744		—	Carteret	George II r. 1727–1760
John Leveson-Gower; 1st Earl Gower (Note: Baron Gower from 1709; created Earl Gower in 1746)	27 December 1744	8 June 1755		Tory	Broad Bottom (I & II)	George II r. 1727–1760
John Leveson-Gower; 1st Earl Gower	27 December 1744	8 June 1755		Tory	Newcastle I	George II r. 1727–1760
Charles Spencer; 3rd Duke of Marlborough	8 June 1755	22 December 1755		—	Newcastle I	George II r. 1727–1760
Granville Leveson-Gower; 2nd Earl Gower	22 December 1755	30 June 1757		Tory	Newcastle I	George II r. 1727–1760
Granville Leveson-Gower; 2nd Earl Gower	22 December 1755	30 June 1757		Tory	Pitt–Devonshire	George II r. 1727–1760
Granville Leveson-Gower; 2nd Earl Gower	22 December 1755	30 June 1757		Tory	1757 Caretaker	George II r. 1727–1760
Richard Grenville-Temple; 2nd Earl Temple	30 June 1757	5 October 1761		—	Pitt–Newcastle	George II r. 1727–1760
Richard Grenville-Temple; 2nd Earl Temple	30 June 1757	5 October 1761		—	Pitt–Newcastle	George III (1760–1820) (Note: The Prince of Wales served as prince regent from 5 February 1811.)
John Russell; 4th Duke of Bedford	25 November 1761	22 April 1763		Whig	Pitt–Newcastle	George III (1760–1820)
John Russell; 4th Duke of Bedford	25 November 1761	22 April 1763		Whig	Bute	George III (1760–1820)
George Spencer; 4th Duke of Marlborough	22 April 1763	30 July 1765		—	Grenville (Whig–Tory)	George III (1760–1820)
Thomas Pelham-Holles; 1st Duke of Newcastle	30 July 1765	30 July 1766		Whig	Rockingham I	George III (1760–1820)
William Pitt; 1st Earl of Chatham	30 July 1766	2 November 1768	Prime Minister	Whig	Chatham (Whig–Tory)	George III (1760–1820)
George Hervey; 2nd Earl of Bristol	2 November 1768	26 February 1770		—	Grafton (Whig–Tory)	George III (1760–1820)
George Montagu-Dunk; 2nd Earl of Halifax	26 February 1770	22 January 1771		Tory	North	George III (1760–1820)
Henry Howard; 12th Earl of Suffolk	22 January 1771	12 June 1771		—	North	George III (1760–1820)
Augustus FitzRoy; 3rd Duke of Grafton	12 June 1771	4 November 1775		Whig	North	George III (1760–1820)
William Legge; 2nd Earl of Dartmouth	4 November 1775	27 March 1782		—	North	George III (1760–1820)
Augustus FitzRoy; 3rd Duke of Grafton	27 March 1782	4 April 1783		Whig	Rockingham II	George III (1760–1820)
Augustus FitzRoy; 3rd Duke of Grafton	27 March 1782	4 April 1783		Whig	Shelburne (Whig–Tory)	George III (1760–1820)
Frederick Howard; 5th Earl of Carlisle	4 April 1783	23 December 1783		—	Fox–North (Whig–Tory)	George III (1760–1820)
Charles Manners; 4th Duke of Rutland	23 December 1783	27 November 1784		—	Pitt I	George III (1760–1820)
Granville Leveson-Gower; 1st Marquess of Stafford (Note: Earl Gower from 1754; created Marquess of Stafford in 1786)	27 November 1784	1794		Tory	Pitt I	George III (1760–1820)
George Spencer; 2nd Earl Spencer	1794	16 July 1794		Whig	Pitt I	George III (1760–1820)
John Pitt; 2nd Earl of Chatham	16 July 1794	14 February 1798		—	Pitt I	George III (1760–1820)
John Fane; 10th Earl of Westmorland	14 February 1798	5 February 1806		Tory	Pitt I	George III (1760–1820)
John Fane; 10th Earl of Westmorland	14 February 1798	5 February 1806		Tory	Addington	George III (1760–1820)
John Fane; 10th Earl of Westmorland	14 February 1798	5 February 1806		Tory	Pitt II	George III (1760–1820)
Henry Addington; 1st Viscount Sidmouth	5 February 1806	15 October 1806		Tory	All the Talents (Whig–Tory)	George III (1760–1820)
Henry Vassall-Fox; 3rd Baron Holland	15 October 1806	25 March 1807		Whig	All the Talents (Whig–Tory)	George III (1760–1820)
John Fane; 10th Earl of Westmorland	25 March 1807	30 April 1827		Tory	Portland II	George III (1760–1820)
John Fane; 10th Earl of Westmorland	25 March 1807	30 April 1827		Tory	Perceval	George III (1760–1820)
John Fane; 10th Earl of Westmorland	25 March 1807	30 April 1827		Tory	Liverpool	George III (1760–1820)
John Fane; 10th Earl of Westmorland	25 March 1807	30 April 1827		Tory	Liverpool	George IV r. 1820–1830
William Cavendish-Scott-Bentinck; 4th Duke of Portland	30 April 1827	16 July 1827		Tory	Canning (Canningite–Whig)	George IV r. 1820–1830
George Howard; 6th Earl of Carlisle	16 July 1827	26 January 1828		Whig	Canning (Canningite–Whig)	George IV r. 1820–1830
George Howard; 6th Earl of Carlisle	16 July 1827	26 January 1828		Whig	Goderich (Canningite–Whig)	George IV r. 1820–1830
Edward Law; 2nd Baron Ellenborough	26 January 1828	10 June 1829	President of the Board of Control (Note: Served as President of the Board of Control from September 1828)	Tory	Wellington–Peel	George IV r. 1820–1830
James St Clair-Erskine; 2nd Earl of Rosslyn	10 June 1829	22 November 1830		Tory	Wellington–Peel	George IV r. 1820–1830
James St Clair-Erskine; 2nd Earl of Rosslyn	10 June 1829	22 November 1830		Tory	Wellington–Peel	William IV r. 1830–1837
John Lambton; 1st Baron Durham	22 November 1830	3 April 1833		Whig	Grey	William IV r. 1830–1837
Frederick John Robinson; 1st Earl of Ripon	3 April 1833	5 June 1834		Whig	Grey	William IV r. 1830–1837
George Howard; 6th Earl of Carlisle	5 June 1834	30 July 1834		Whigs	Grey	William IV r. 1830–1837
Constantine Phipps; 2nd Earl of Mulgrave	30 July 1834	14 November 1834		Whig	Melbourne I	William IV r. 1830–1837
James Stuart-Wortley-Mackenzie; 1st Baron Wharncliffe	15 December 1834	8 April 1835		Conservative	Peel I	William IV r. 1830–1837
John Ponsonby; 1st Baron Duncannon styled Viscount Duncannon	23 April 1835	15 January 1840	First Commissioner of Woods and Forests	Whig	Melbourne II	William IV r. 1830–1837
John Ponsonby; 1st Baron Duncannon styled Viscount Duncannon	23 April 1835	15 January 1840	First Commissioner of Woods and Forests	Whig	Melbourne II	Victoria r. 1837–1901
George Villiers; 4th Earl of Clarendon	15 January 1840	30 August 1841	Chancellor of the Duchy of Lancaster (Note: Served as Chancellor of the Duchy of Lancaster October 1840 – June 1841)	Whig	Melbourne II	Victoria r. 1837–1901
Richard Temple-Nugent-Brydges-Chandos-Grenville; 2nd Duke of Buckingham and Chandos	3 September 1841	2 February 1842		Conservative	Peel II	Victoria r. 1837–1901
Walter Montagu-Douglas-Scott; 5th Duke of Buccleuch	2 February 1842	21 January 1846		Conservative	Peel II	Victoria r. 1837–1901
Thomas Hamilton; 9th Earl of Haddington	21 January 1846	27 June 1846		Conservative	Peel II	Victoria r. 1837–1901
Gilbert Elliot-Murray-Kynynmound; 2nd Earl of Minto	6 July 1846	21 February 1852		Whig	Russell I	Victoria r. 1837–1901
James Gascoyne-Cecil; 2nd Marquess of Salisbury	27 February 1852	17 December 1852		Conservative	Who? Who?	Victoria r. 1837–1901
George Campbell; 8th Duke of Argyll	4 January 1853	7 December 1855		Peelite	Aberdeen (Peelite–Whig)	Victoria r. 1837–1901
George Campbell; 8th Duke of Argyll	4 January 1853	7 December 1855		Peelite	Palmerston I	Victoria r. 1837–1901
Dudley Ryder; 2nd Earl of Harrowby	7 December 1855	3 February 1858		Whig	Palmerston I	Victoria r. 1837–1901
Ulick de Burgh; 1st Marquess of Clanricarde	3 February 1858	21 February 1858		Whig	Palmerston I	Victoria r. 1837–1901
Charles Yorke; 4th Earl of Hardwicke	26 February 1858	11 June 1859		Conservative	Derby–Disraeli II	Victoria r. 1837–1901
George Campbell; 8th Duke of Argyll	18 June 1859	26 June 1866		Liberal	Palmerston II	Victoria r. 1837–1901
George Campbell; 8th Duke of Argyll	18 June 1859	26 June 1866		Liberal	Russell II	Victoria r. 1837–1901
James Harris; 3rd Earl of Malmesbury	6 July 1866	1 December 1868		Conservative	Derby–Disraeli III	Victoria r. 1837–1901
John Wodehouse; 1st Earl of Kimberley	9 December 1868	6 July 1870		Liberal	Gladstone I	Victoria r. 1837–1901
Charles Wood; 1st Viscount Halifax	6 July 1870	17 February 1874		Liberal	Gladstone I	Victoria r. 1837–1901
James Harris; 3rd Earl of Malmesbury	21 February 1874	12 August 1876		Conservative	Disraeli II	Victoria r. 1837–1901
Benjamin Disraeli; 1st Earl of Beaconsfield	12 August 1876	4 February 1878	Prime Minister; First Lord of the Treasury	Conservative	Disraeli II	Victoria r. 1837–1901
Algernon Percy; 6th Duke of Northumberland	4 February 1878	21 April 1880		Conservative	Disraeli II	Victoria r. 1837–1901
George Campbell; 8th Duke of Argyll	28 April 1880	2 May 1881		Liberal	Gladstone II	Victoria r. 1837–1901
Chichester Parkinson-Fortescue; 1st Baron Carlingford	2 May 1881	5 March 1885		Liberal	Gladstone II	Victoria r. 1837–1901
Archibald Primrose; 5th Earl of Rosebery	5 March 1885	9 June 1885	First Commissioner of Works	Liberal	Gladstone II	Victoria r. 1837–1901
Dudley Ryder; 3rd Earl of Harrowby	24 June 1885	28 January 1886		Conservative	Salisbury I	Victoria r. 1837–1901
William Ewart Gladstone; MP for Midlothian	17 February 1886	20 July 1886	Prime Minister; First Lord of the Treasury; Leader of the House of Commons	Liberal	Gladstone III	Victoria r. 1837–1901
George Cadogan; 5th Earl Cadogan	3 August 1886	11 August 1892		Conservative	Salisbury II	Victoria r. 1837–1901
William Ewart Gladstone; MP for Midlothian	20 August 1892	10 March 1894	Prime Minister; First Lord of the Treasury; Leader of the House of Commons	Liberal	Gladstone IV	Victoria r. 1837–1901
Edward Marjoribanks; 2nd Baron Tweedmouth	10 March 1894	21 June 1895	Chancellor of the Duchy of Lancaster (Note: Served as Chancellor of the Duchy of Lancaster from May 1894)	Liberal	Rosebery	Victoria r. 1837–1901
Richard Assheton Cross; 1st Viscount Cross	29 June 1895	12 November 1900		Conservative	Salisbury (III & IV) (Con.–Lib.U.)	Victoria r. 1837–1901
Robert Gascoyne-Cecil; 3rd Marquess of Salisbury	12 November 1900	July; 1902	Prime Minister; Leader of the House of Lords	Conservative	Salisbury (III & IV) (Con.–Lib.U.)	Victoria r. 1837–1901
Robert Gascoyne-Cecil; 3rd Marquess of Salisbury	12 November 1900	July; 1902	Prime Minister; Leader of the House of Lords	Conservative	Salisbury (III & IV) (Con.–Lib.U.)	Edward VII r. 1901–1910
Arthur Balfour; MP for Manchester East	14 July 1902	October; 1903	Prime Minister; First Lord of the Treasury; Leader of the House of Commons	Conservative	Balfour (Con.–Lib.U.)	Edward VII r. 1901–1910
James Gascoyne-Cecil; 4th Marquess of Salisbury	17 October 1903	December; 1905	President of the Board of Trade (Note: Served as President of the Board of Trade from March 1905)	Conservative	Balfour (Con.–Lib.U.)	Edward VII r. 1901–1910
George Robinson; 1st Marquess of Ripon	10 December 1905	October; 1908	Leader of the House of Lords (Note: Served as Leader of the House of Lords from April 1908)	Liberal	Campbell-Bannerman	Edward VII r. 1901–1910
George Robinson; 1st Marquess of Ripon	10 December 1905	October; 1908	Leader of the House of Lords	Liberal	Asquith (I–III)	Edward VII r. 1901–1910
Robert Crewe-Milnes; 1st Marquess of Crewe (Note: Earl of Crewe from 1895; created Marquess of Crewe July 1911)	9 October 1908	October; 1911	Leader of the House of Lords; Secretary of State for the Colonies (Note: Served as Secretary of State for the Colonies until November 1910); Secretary of State for India (Note: Served as Secretary of State for India November 1910 – March 1911; and from May 1911)	Liberal	Asquith (I–III)	Edward VII r. 1901–1910
Robert Crewe-Milnes; 1st Marquess of Crewe	9 October 1908	October; 1911	Leader of the House of Lords; Secretary of State for the Colonies; Secretary of State for India	Liberal	Asquith (I–III)	George V r. 1910–1936
Charles Wynn-Carington; 1st Earl Carrington	23 October 1911	February; 1912		Liberal	Asquith (I–III)	George V r. 1910–1936
Robert Crewe-Milnes; 1st Marquess of Crewe	13 February 1912	May; 1915	Secretary of State for India; Leader of the House of Lords	Liberal	Asquith (I–III)	George V r. 1910–1936
George Curzon; 1st Earl Curzon of Kedleston	25 May 1915	December; 1916	President of the Air Board (Note: Served as President of the Air Board from May 1916)	Conservative	Asquith Coalition (Lib.–Con.–Lab.)	George V r. 1910–1936
David Lindsay; 27th Earl of Crawford	15 December 1916	January; 1919		Conservative	Lloyd George (I & II) (Lib.–Con.–Lab.)	George V r. 1910–1936
Bonar Law; MP for Glasgow Central	10 January 1919	March; 1921	Leader of the House of Commons	Conservative	Lloyd George (I & II) (Lib.–Con.–Lab.)	George V r. 1910–1936
Austen Chamberlain; MP for Birmingham West	23 March 1921	October; 1922	Leader of the House of Commons	Conservative	Lloyd George (I & II) (Lib.–Con.–Lab.)	George V r. 1910–1936
Vacant	October; 1922	May; 1923			Law	George V r. 1910–1936
Robert Cecil; 1st Viscount Cecil of Chelwood (Note: MP for Hitchin until 1923; created Viscount Cecil of Chelwood December 1923)	28 May 1923	January; 1924		Conservative	Baldwin I	George V r. 1910–1936
J. R. Clynes; MP for Manchester Platting	22 January 1924	November; 1924	Deputy Leader of the House of Commons	Labour	MacDonald I	George V r. 1910–1936
James Gascoyne-Cecil; 4th Marquess of Salisbury	6 November 1924	June; 1929	Leader of the House of Lords (Note: Served as Leader of the House of Lords from April 1925)	Conservative	Baldwin II	George V r. 1910–1936
Jimmy Thomas; MP for Derby	7 June 1929	June; 1930		Labour	MacDonald II	George V r. 1910–1936
Vernon Hartshorn; MP for Ogmore	5 June 1930	March; 1931		Labour	MacDonald II	George V r. 1910–1936
Tom Johnston; MP for West Stirlingshire	24 March 1931	August; 1931		Labour	MacDonald II	George V r. 1910–1936
William Peel; 1st Earl Peel	August; 1931	November; 1931		Conservative	National I (N.Lab.–Con.–Lib.N.–Lib.)	George V r. 1910–1936
Philip Snowden; 1st Viscount Snowden	5 November 1931	September; 1932		National Labour	National II (N.Lab.–Con.–Lib.N.–Lib.)	George V r. 1910–1936
Stanley Baldwin; MP for Bewdley	29 September 1932	December; 1933	Lord President of the Council	Conservative	National II (N.Lab.–Con.–Lib.N.–Lib.)	George V r. 1910–1936
Anthony Eden; MP for Warwick and Leamington	31 December 1933	June; 1935		Conservative	National II (N.Lab.–Con.–Lib.N.–Lib.)	George V r. 1910–1936
Charles Vane-Tempest-Stewart; 7th Marquess of Londonderry	7 June 1935	November; 1935	Leader of the House of Lords	Conservative	National III (Con.–N.Lab.–Lib.N.)	George V r. 1910–1936
Edward Wood; 3rd Viscount Halifax	22 November 1935	May; 1937	Leader of the House of Lords	Conservative	National III (Con.–N.Lab.–Lib.N.)	George V r. 1910–1936
Edward Wood; 3rd Viscount Halifax	22 November 1935	May; 1937	Leader of the House of Lords	Conservative	National III (Con.–N.Lab.–Lib.N.)	Edward VIII r. 1936
Edward Wood; 3rd Viscount Halifax	22 November 1935	May; 1937	Leader of the House of Lords	Conservative	National III (Con.–N.Lab.–Lib.N.)	George VI r. 1936–1952
Herbrand Sackville; 9th Earl De La Warr	28 May 1937	October; 1938		National Labour	National IV (Con.–N.Lab.–Lib.N.)	George VI r. 1936–1952
John Anderson; 1st Viscount Waverley; MP for Combined Scottish Universities	31 October 1938	September; 1939		Independent (National)	National IV (Con.–N.Lab.–Lib.N.)	George VI r. 1936–1952
Samuel Hoare; 1st Viscount Templewood; MP for Chelsea	3 September 1939	April; 1940		Conservative	Chamberlain War (Con.–N.Lab.–Lib.N.)	George VI r. 1936–1952
Kingsley Wood; MP for Woolwich West	3 April 1940	May; 1940		Conservative	Chamberlain War (Con.–N.Lab.–Lib.N.)	George VI r. 1936–1952
Clement Attlee; MP for Limehouse	11 May 1940	February; 1942	Deputy Leader of the House of Commons	Labour	Churchill War (All parties)	George VI r. 1936–1952
Stafford Cripps; MP for Bristol East	19 February 1942	November; 1942	Leader of the House of Commons	Labour	Churchill War (All parties)	George VI r. 1936–1952
Robert Gascoyne-Cecil; Viscount Cranborne	22 November 1942	September; 1943	Leader of the House of Lords	Conservative	Churchill War (All parties)	George VI r. 1936–1952
Max Aitken; 1st Baron Beaverbrook	24 September 1943	July; 1945		Conservative	Churchill War (All parties)	George VI r. 1936–1952
Max Aitken; 1st Baron Beaverbrook	24 September 1943	July; 1945		Conservative	Churchill Caretaker (Con.–N.Lib.)	George VI r. 1936–1952
Arthur Greenwood; MP for Wakefield	27 July 1945	17 April 1947	Paymaster General (Note: Served as Paymaster General July 1946 – March 1947)	Labour	Attlee (I & II)	George VI r. 1936–1952
Philip Inman; 1st Baron Inman	17 April 1947	7 October 1947		Labour	Attlee (I & II)	George VI r. 1936–1952
Christopher Addison; 1st Viscount Addison	7 October 1947	9 March 1951	Leader of the House of Lords; Paymaster General (Note: Served as Paymaster General July 1948 – April 1949)	Labour	Attlee (I & II)	George VI r. 1936–1952
Ernest Bevin; MP for Woolwich East	9 March 1951	14 April 1951		Labour	Attlee (I & II)	George VI r. 1936–1952
Richard Stokes; MP for Ipswich	26 April 1951	October; 1951	Minister of Materials (Note: Served as Minister of Materials from July 1951)	Labour	Attlee (I & II)	George VI r. 1936–1952
Robert Gascoyne-Cecil; 5th Marquess of Salisbury	28 October 1951	7 May 1952	Leader of the House of Lords; Secretary of State for Commonwealth Relations (Note: Served as Secretary of State for Commonwealth Relations from March 1952)	Conservative	Churchill III	George VI r. 1936–1952
Robert Gascoyne-Cecil; 5th Marquess of Salisbury	28 October 1951	7 May 1952	Leader of the House of Lords; Secretary of State for Commonwealth Relations	Conservative	Churchill III	Elizabeth II r. 1952–2022
Harry Crookshank; MP for Gainsborough	7 May 1952	20 December 1955	Leader of the House of Commons	Conservative	Churchill III	Elizabeth II r. 1952–2022
Harry Crookshank; MP for Gainsborough	7 May 1952	20 December 1955	Leader of the House of Commons	Conservative	Eden	Elizabeth II r. 1952–2022
R. A. Butler; MP for Saffron Walden	20 December 1955	October; 1959	Leader of the House of Commons; Secretary of State for the Home Department (Note: Served as Secretary of State for the Home Department from January 1957)	Conservative	Eden	Elizabeth II r. 1952–2022
R. A. Butler; MP for Saffron Walden	20 December 1955	October; 1959	Leader of the House of Commons; Secretary of State for the Home Department	Conservative	Macmillan (I & II)	Elizabeth II r. 1952–2022
Quintin Hogg; 2nd Viscount Hailsham	14 October 1959	July; 1960	Minister for Science (Note: Served as Minister for Science from November 1959 to March 1964)	Conservative	Macmillan (I & II)	Elizabeth II r. 1952–2022
Edward Heath; MP for Bexley	27 July 1960	October; 1963	Deputy Secretary of State for Foreign Affairs	Conservative	Macmillan (I & II)	Elizabeth II r. 1952–2022
Selwyn Lloyd; MP for Wirral	20 October 1963	October; 1964	Leader of the House of Commons	Conservative	Douglas-Home	Elizabeth II r. 1952–2022
Frank Pakenham; 7th Earl of Longford	18 October 1964	December; 1965	Leader of the House of Lords	Labour	Wilson (I & II)	Elizabeth II r. 1952–2022
Frank Soskice; MP for Newport	23 December 1965	April; 1966		Labour	Wilson (I & II)	Elizabeth II r. 1952–2022
Frank Pakenham; 7th Earl of Longford	6 April 1966	January; 1968	Leader of the House of Lords	Labour	Wilson (I & II)	Elizabeth II r. 1952–2022
Edward Shackleton; Baron Shackleton	16 January 1968	April; 1968	Leader of the House of Lords	Labour	Wilson (I & II)	Elizabeth II r. 1952–2022
Fred Peart; MP for Workington	6 April 1968	October; 1968		Labour	Wilson (I & II)	Elizabeth II r. 1952–2022
Edward Shackleton; Baron Shackleton	18 October 1968	June; 1970	Leader of the House of Lords	Labour	Wilson (I & II)	Elizabeth II r. 1952–2022
George Jellicoe; 2nd Earl Jellicoe	20 June 1970	June; 1973	Leader of the House of Lords	Conservative	Heath	Elizabeth II r. 1952–2022
David Hennessy; 3rd Baron Windlesham	5 June 1973	March; 1974	Leader of the House of Lords	Conservative	Heath	Elizabeth II r. 1952–2022
Malcolm Shepherd; 2nd Baron Shepherd	7 March 1974	September; 1976	Leader of the House of Lords	Labour	Wilson (III & IV)	Elizabeth II r. 1952–2022
Malcolm Shepherd; 2nd Baron Shepherd	7 March 1974	September; 1976	Leader of the House of Lords	Labour	Callaghan	Elizabeth II r. 1952–2022
Fred Peart; Baron Peart	10 September 1976	May; 1979	Leader of the House of Lords	Labour	Callaghan	Elizabeth II r. 1952–2022
Ian Gilmour; Baron Gilmour of Craigmillar; MP for Chesham and Amersham	5 May 1979	September; 1981	Government spokesman in the House of Commons for Foreign and Commonwealth Affairs	Conservative	Thatcher I	Elizabeth II r. 1952–2022
Humphrey Atkins; MP for Spelthorne	14 September 1981	April; 1982	Government spokesman in the House of Commons for Foreign and Commonwealth Affairs	Conservative	Thatcher I	Elizabeth II r. 1952–2022
Janet Young; Baroness Young	6 April 1982	June; 1983	Leader of the House of Lords	Conservative	Thatcher I	Elizabeth II r. 1952–2022
John Biffen; MP for North Shropshire	11 June 1983	June; 1987	Leader of the House of Commons	Conservative	Thatcher II	Elizabeth II r. 1952–2022
John Wakeham; MP for South Colchester and Maldon	13 June 1987	10 January 1988	Leader of the House of Commons	Conservative	Thatcher III	Elizabeth II r. 1952–2022
John Ganzoni; 2nd Baron Belstead	10 January 1988	28 November 1990	Leader of the House of Lords	Conservative	Thatcher III	Elizabeth II r. 1952–2022
David Waddington; Baron Waddington	28 November 1990	11 April 1992	Leader of the House of Lords	Conservative	Major I	Elizabeth II r. 1952–2022
John Wakeham; Baron Wakeham	11 April 1992	20 July 1994	Leader of the House of Lords	Conservative	Major I	Elizabeth II r. 1952–2022
Robert Gascoyne-Cecil; Viscount Cranborne	20 July 1994	2 May 1997	Leader of the House of Lords	Conservative	Major I	Elizabeth II r. 1952–2022
Robert Gascoyne-Cecil; Viscount Cranborne	20 July 1994	2 May 1997	Leader of the House of Lords	Conservative	Major II	Elizabeth II r. 1952–2022
Ivor Richard; Baron Richard	2 May 1997	27 July 1998	Leader of the House of Lords	Labour	Blair I	Elizabeth II r. 1952–2022
Margaret Jay; Baroness Jay of Paddington	27 July 1998	8 June 2001	Leader of the House of Lords; Minister for Women	Labour	Blair I	Elizabeth II r. 1952–2022
Gareth Williams; Baron Williams of Mostyn	8 June 2001	13 June 2003	Leader of the House of Lords	Labour	Blair II	Elizabeth II r. 1952–2022
Peter Hain; MP for Neath	13 June 2003	6 May 2005	Leader of the House of Commons	Labour	Blair II	Elizabeth II r. 1952–2022
Geoff Hoon; MP for Ashfield	6 May 2005	5 May 2006	Leader of the House of Commons	Labour	Blair III	Elizabeth II r. 1952–2022
Jack Straw; MP for Blackburn	5 May 2006	28 June 2007	Leader of the House of Commons	Labour	Blair III	Elizabeth II r. 1952–2022
Harriet Harman; MP for Camberwell and Peckham	28 June 2007	11 May 2010	Leader of the House of Commons; Minister for Women and Equality	Labour	Brown	Elizabeth II r. 1952–2022
George Young; MP for North West Hampshire	12 May 2010	4 September 2012	Leader of the House of Commons	Conservative	Cameron–Clegg (Con.–L.D.)	Elizabeth II r. 1952–2022
Andrew Lansley; MP for South Cambridgeshire	4 September 2012	14 July 2014	Leader of the House of Commons	Conservative	Cameron–Clegg (Con.–L.D.)	Elizabeth II r. 1952–2022
Tina Stowell; Baroness Stowell of Beeston	15 July 2014	14 July 2016	Leader of the House of Lords	Conservative	Cameron–Clegg (Con.–L.D.)	Elizabeth II r. 1952–2022
Tina Stowell; Baroness Stowell of Beeston	15 July 2014	14 July 2016	Leader of the House of Lords	Conservative	Cameron II	Elizabeth II r. 1952–2022
Natalie Evans; Baroness Evans of Bowes Park	14 July 2016	6 September 2022	Leader of the House of Lords	Conservative	May I	Elizabeth II r. 1952–2022
Natalie Evans; Baroness Evans of Bowes Park	14 July 2016	6 September 2022	Leader of the House of Lords	Conservative	May II	Elizabeth II r. 1952–2022
Natalie Evans; Baroness Evans of Bowes Park	14 July 2016	6 September 2022	Leader of the House of Lords	Conservative	Johnson I	Elizabeth II r. 1952–2022
Natalie Evans; Baroness Evans of Bowes Park	14 July 2016	6 September 2022	Leader of the House of Lords	Conservative	Johnson II	Elizabeth II r. 1952–2022
Nicholas True; Baron True	6 September 2022	5 July 2024	Leader of the House of Lords	Conservative	Truss	Elizabeth II r. 1952–2022
Nicholas True; Baron True	6 September 2022	5 July 2024	Leader of the House of Lords	Conservative	Truss	Charles III (2022–present)
Nicholas True; Baron True	6 September 2022	5 July 2024	Leader of the House of Lords	Conservative	Sunak	Charles III (2022–present)
Angela Smith; Baroness Smith of Basildon	5 July 2024	Incumbent	Leader of the House of Lords	Labour	Starmer	Charles III (2022–present)
Angela Smith; Baroness Smith of Basildon	5 July 2024	Incumbent	Leader of the House of Lords	Labour	Burnham	Charles III (2022–present)

== Other countries ==
- Keeper of the seals of France
- Lord Keeper of the Privy Seal of Japan
- Keeper of the Rulers' Seal of Malaysia

== See also ==
- Chancellor of the Duchy of Lancaster
- Keeper of the Privy Seal of Scotland
- Lord Keeper of the Great Seal
- Lord Privy Seal (term), as used in the television news business
