= Robert Neville (bishop) =

Bishop of Durham and Salisbury (1404–1457)

- Bishop of Durham
- Appointed: 27 January 1438
- Term ended: 8 or 9 July 1457
- Predecessor: Thomas Langley
- Successor: Laurence Booth
- Previous post: Bishop of Salisbury

Orders
- Consecration: 26 October 1427

Personal details
- Born: Raby, Durham
- Died: 8 or 9 July 1457
- Denomination: Catholic

Robert Neville (1404 – 8 or 9 July 1457) was an English prelate who served as Bishop of Salisbury and Bishop of Durham. He was also a provost of Beverley. He was born at Raby Castle. His father was Ralph Neville and his mother was Joan Beaufort, daughter of John of Gaunt. He was thus a highly placed member of the English aristocracy.

Neville was nominated Bishop of Salisbury on 9 July 1427, and consecrated on 26 October 1427. He was then translated to Durham on 27 January 1438.

Neville died on 8 July 1457.

== Citations ==
Catholic Church titles
| Preceded by John Chandler | Bishop of Salisbury; 1427–1438 | Succeeded by William Ayscough |
| Preceded by Thomas Langley | Bishop of Durham; 1437–1457 | Succeeded by Laurence Booth |
