= Philip Morgan (bishop) =

Welsh prelate, Archbishop of York-elect from 1423 to 1424

- Bishop of Ely
- Installed: 27 February 1426
- Term ended: 25 October 1435
- Predecessor: John Fordham
- Successor: Lewis of Luxembourg

Orders
- Consecration: 3 December 1419

Personal details
- Died: 25 October 1435 Bishop's Hatfield, Hertfordshire
- Buried: Church of the Charterhouse, London.
- Denomination: Roman Catholic

Philip Morgan (died 1435) was a Welsh clergyman who served as Bishop of Worcester (1419–1426), then as Bishop of Ely (1426–1435).

Morgan had acquired the degree of Doctor of Laws some time before 1398, when he is mentioned in the Episcopal Registers of St. David's as rector of Aberedw, although not yet ordained priest. He became chaplain to King Henry V of England and accompanied him on his campaigns in Normandy in 1417–20. He was given a diplomatic role and was appointed Chancellor of Normandy in April 1418.

Morgan was elected Bishop of Worcester on 24 April and appointed on 19 June 1419. He received possession of the temporalities of the Diocese of Worcester on 18 October and was consecrated on 3 December 1419 in Rouen Cathedral while still in France with King Henry. He was postulated to the archbishopric of York in November or December 1423, but the move was quashed on 14 February 1424. He remained Bishop of Worcester until he was translated to the bishopric of Ely on 27 February and received possession of the temporalities of the Diocese of Ely on 22 April 1426.

Morgan died at Bishop's Hatfield, Hertfordshire on 25 October 1435, and buried at the church of the Charterhouse in London.

== Citations ==
Catholic Church titles
Preceded by Thomas Peverel	Bishop of Worcester; 1419–1426	Succeeded by Thomas Poulton
Preceded by Henry Bowet as archbishop	Archbishop-elect of York; 1423–1424	Succeeded by Richard Fleming
Preceded by John Fordham	Bishop of Ely; 1426–1435	Succeeded by Lewis of Luxembourg
