= Thomas Peverel =

14th and 15th-century Bishop of Worcester, Bishop of Ossory, and Bishop of Landaff

- Bishop of Worcester
- Province: Canterbury
- Appointed: 4 July 1407
- Term ended: March 1419
- Predecessor: Richard Clifford
- Successor: Philip Morgan
- Previous posts: Bishop of Ossory, Bishop of Llandaff

Personal details
- Died: 1 or 2 March 1419
- Denomination: Catholic

Thomas Peverel (died 1419) was a medieval prelate who was successively bishop of Ossory, Llandaff, and Worcester.

Peverel was appointed the Bishop of Ossory by papal provision on 25 October 1395, and was translated to Llandaff on 12 July 1398. He was translated again to Worcester on 4 July 1407.

Peverel died in office on 1 or 2 March 1419.

== Citations ==
Catholic Church titles
| Preceded by Richard Northalis | Bishop of Ossory; 1395–1398 | Succeeded by John Waltham |
| Preceded by John Burghill | Bishop of Llandaff; 1398–1407 | Succeeded by John de la Zouche |
| Preceded by Richard Clifford | Bishop of Worcester; 1407–1419 | Succeeded by Philip Morgan |
