= Peter Lacy (Lord Privy Seal) =

Medieval English Keeper of the Privy Seal (1310–1375)

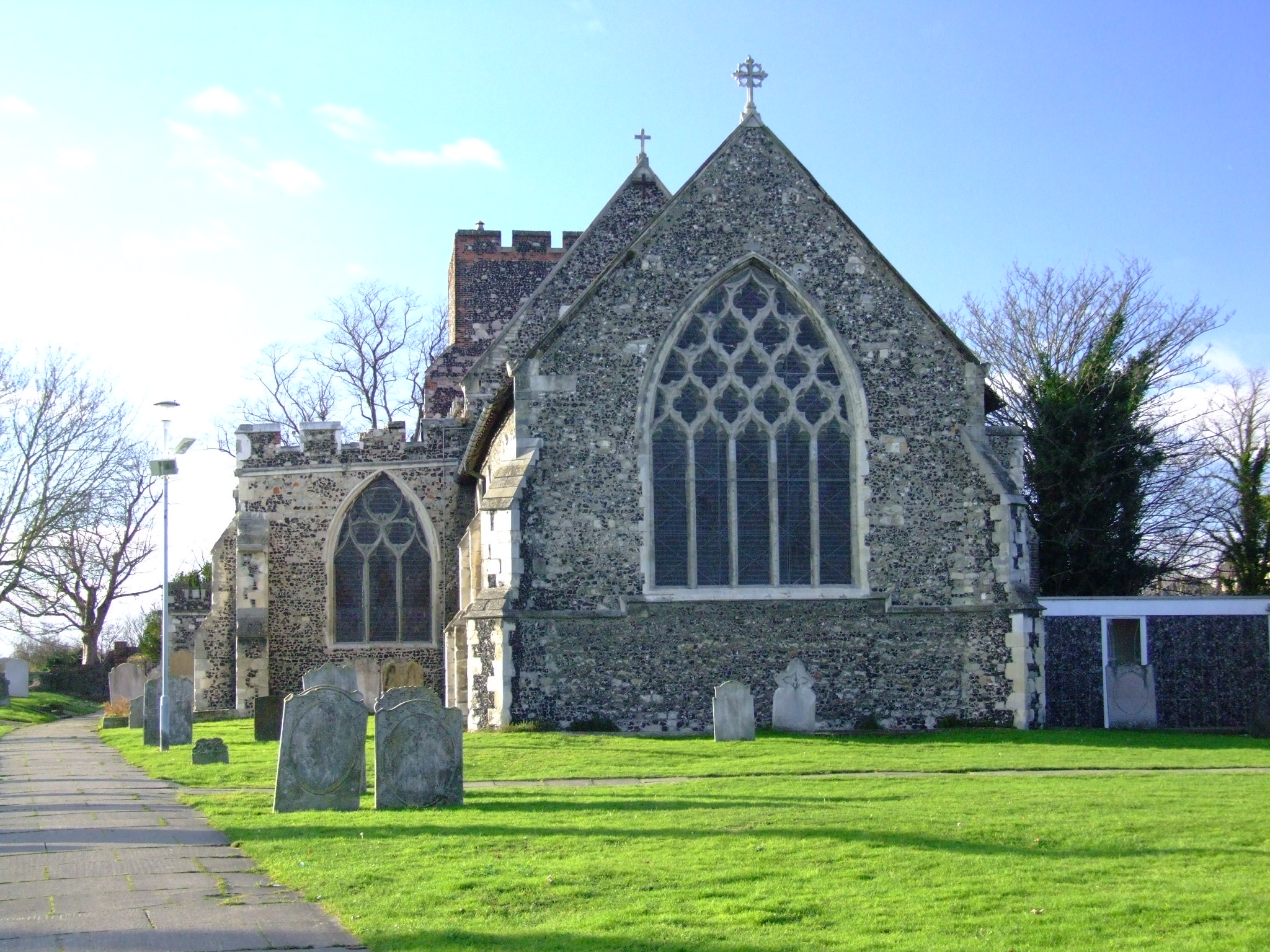
St. Botolph´s Church, Northfleet, where Peter Lacy was buried.

Peter Lacy (c.1310-18 October 1375) was a medieval English Keeper of the Privy Seal.

He started his administrative career as a clerk in the office of Prince Edward, the Black Prince, the eldest son of Edward III. By 1347 he was the Prince's receiver-general, responsible for collecting the income from the Duchy of Cornwall and other estates, much of which was spent on the prince's military campaigns in France.

In 1363 Lacy was the priest of Northfleet, Kent and prebendary of Wolverhampton and Bisley, the latter of which he exchanged for the prebendary of Swords, in Ireland.

When William Wyckham became Chancellor in 1367, Lacy was appointed Keeper of the Privy Seal in his stead. When Wyckham resigned his post in 1371, under pressure from anti-clerical pressures in Parliament, Lacy was obliged to follow suit. They were succeeded by laymen.

He died in 1375 in his Northfleet parish and was buried in St Botolph's Church, Northfleet.

Political offices
| Preceded by William of Wykeham | Lord Privy Seal; 1367–1371 | Succeeded by Nicholas Carew |
