= Henry Bowet =

Archbishop of York from 1407 to 1423

- Archbishop of York
- Appointed: 7 October 1407
- Installed: unknown
- Term ended: 20 October 1423
- Predecessor: Robert Hallam
- Successor: Philip Morgan

Orders
- Consecration: translated 7 October 1407

Personal details
- Died: 20 October 1423 Cawood Palace
- Buried: York Minster
- Denomination: Roman Catholic

Henry Bowet (died 20 October 1423) was both Bishop of Bath and Wells and Archbishop of York.

== Life ==
Bowet was a royal clerk to King Richard II of England, and at one point carried letters of recommendation to Pope Urban VI from the king.

Bowet became Bishop of Bath and Wells on 19 August 1401, and succeeded to the Archbishopric of York on 7 October 1407, after it had been vacant for two and a half years.

The pope had already appointed Robert Hallam to the northern primacy, but, finding that Henry IV desired to see Bowet installed, he nominated Hallam to the see of Salisbury and gave the pallium to Bowet.

In 1402 Bowet briefly served as Lord High Treasurer, from February to October.

In 1417 the Scots invaded England and sat down before Berwick-on-Tweed. The Duke of Exeter marched to the relief of the town and Archbishop Bowet, then very old and feeble, had himself carried into the camp where his addresses are said to have greatly encouraged the English soldiers. The Scots decamped hastily in the night, leaving behind them their stores and baggage.

Bowet died on 20 October 1423 at Cawood Bishop's Palace and was buried in his cathedral of York Minster.

== Citations ==
Political offices
Preceded by Laurence Allerthorp	Lord High Treasurer; 1402	Succeeded by Guy Mone
Catholic Church titles
Preceded by John Colton	Dean of St Patrick's Cathedral, Dublin; 1382–1391	Succeeded by Thomas de Everdon
Preceded by Richard Clifford	Bishop of Bath and Wells; 1401–1407	Succeeded by Nicholas Bubwith
Preceded by Robert Hallam	Archbishop of York; 1407–1423	Succeeded by Philip Morgan
