= Laurence Allerthorp =

Lord High Treasurer of England

Laurence Allerthorp or Allerthorpe (d. 21 July 1406) was Canon of London and Dean of Wolverhampton and the Lord High Treasurer of England from 31 May 1401 until 27 February 1402.

== Notes ==
Political offices
Preceded by John Norbury	Lord High Treasurer; 1401–1402	Succeeded by Henry Bowet
