= John Prophet =

English medieval administrator

Personal life
- Born: John Prophet

Religious life
- Religion: Catholic
- Institute: Missionaries of Charity

Senior posting
- Period in office: early 15th century

John Prophet (1356–1416) was an English medieval Secretary to King Henry IV, Keeper of the Privy Seal and, Dean of Hereford and York. A distinguished and capable administrator he remained loyal to all kings through a mix of shrewdness, and cunning. Guilty of simony and pluralism, Prophet was no Lollard, but successfully made the transition from Richard II's extravagant court at Westminster to an indispensable servant of the Lancastrians.

== Life ==
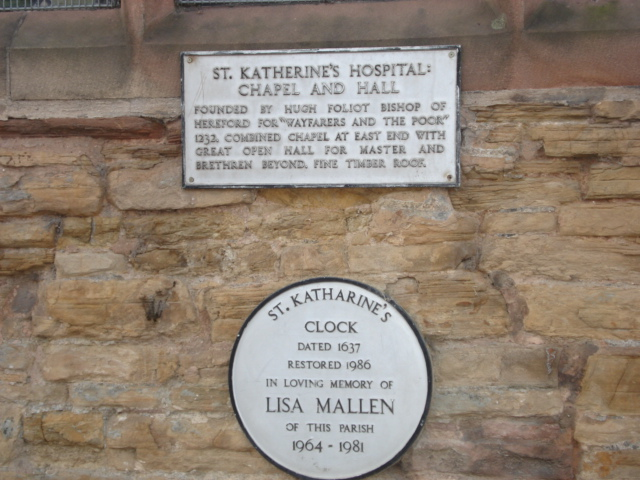
Plaques in Ledbury town centre - geograph.org.uk - 449845

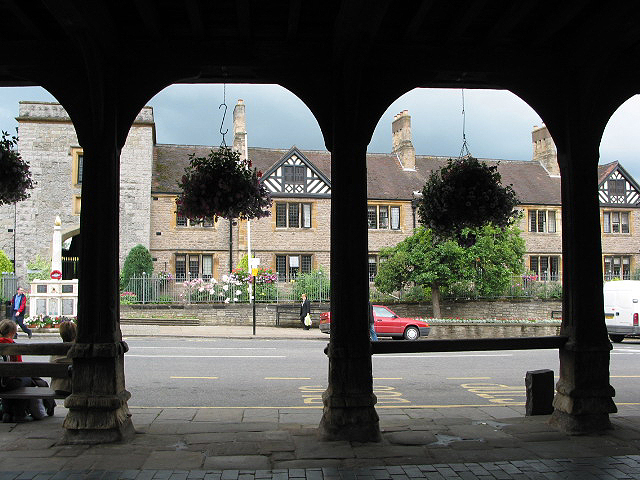
St Katherine's Hospital from the Market Hall, Ledbury - geograph.org.uk - 474583

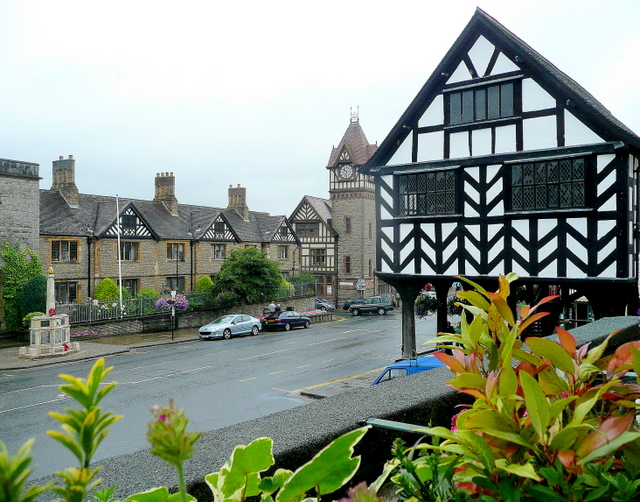
Market House, Ledbury - geograph.org.uk - 1964085

John Prophet was university educated and entered Holy Orders. Ordained a priest he served from 1380 onwards as a clerk in the Privy Seal office and clerk of the council under Richard II. Prophet was appointed Chaplain to Archbishop of Canterbury, William Courtenay in 1382, during which time he was made a prebendary of Wingham church. He was then converted into the diocese at Lincoln, where he became a prebendary of the cathedral in 1384. A habit he continued as he was strictly guilty of pluralism. Among the curios of anomalous gifts was St Tyriocs chapelry in another diocese on Beachley Point. Nonetheless Prophet was a talented administrator and continued to rise; clever servants of the Crown were hard to find, and so were commonly rewarded thus. In 1389 Prophet was promoted a clerk of the royal household. The energetic pursuit of agenda and minute-taking was his hallmark, introducing this system into a Register of proceedings; the first of its kind in England, ran until November 1393 on his collation to Dean of Hereford, but was thence discontinued. Well-acquainted with Ledbury he was presented with a portion of All Saints Parish Church appertaining to Upper Hall in Ledbury Park. He was also preferred as Rector of Orpington in Kent by 1392, and the following year elevated to the Deanery at the time that Richard was on expedition to quell a rebellion in Ireland.

Hereford was a lawless city on the Marches, where dean Prophet was responsible for the Coningsby Hospital. The Bishop Trefnant probably knew Prophet because he had already served with him on the royal council. Master John Prophet was assaulted in its precincts by William Buryton as part of an ongoing feud between the Bishop and Dean and Chapter that spilled over into street violence. There was an inquiry, and later visitation by the Privy Council (which Prophet later chaired as Secretary) to investigate the possible defrocking of the Bishop. Bishop Trefnant's instructions included a visitation to St Katherine's Hospital and Ledbury parish in 1397, which had not been administered since the days of Bishop Foliot. Conditions were poor, and the master William Pykersley was dismissed, to be replaced by an experienced administrator, John Malvern. A new jury was selected and sealed as ordinances on 2 November, submitted to the bishop at his palace of Whitbourne Hall for the confirmation on 16 December 1398. Prophet was determined to provide proper care for the poor, infirm and cure of the souls. Prophet laid down minimum standards by the Ordinances (1398) of food by weight, diet to guarantee wellbeing. Also at St Katherine's a board of discipline was established for the chaplains to ensure pay and conditions for 'life's necessities'. As well as a stipend they were to wear a uniform with a white cross. The chaplains were chosen mainly from local men who retained a vested interest, yet could not now be removed by the Master, but only on order of the Dean and Chapter. But masters of St Katherine's in late 14th and early 15th centuries had a national profile, and Prophet intended a new Mansion House: an H-Plan layout was sustained for the next 400 years providing, buttery, pantry, solar, and central hall with extensive accommodation. Prophet's essay on administrative reform was an unusual and unique legal instrument.

Prophet's ambitious plan with fellow portionist of Lower Hall estate Robert Prees, was in April 1401 to build a newly founded college with eight chantry priests to celebrate mass in union with the premiere parish church in the land, was even for Bishop Trefnant too risky. Prophet accepted the weighty responsibility of royal and episcopal patronage in perpetuity could not be allowed to lead to unjust enrichment. The reduction of the size of the project to just a small chapel for St Katherine's underscored Prophet's shrewd capabilities. Prophet also received the rents of 70 acres at Little Marcle and 27 acres of coppice woodland at Dunbridge, while the tithe at the Hazle that came to the Master by rents allocated to his personal use during this period. In 1414 he proposed a chantry chapel for Hereford Cathedral to be built by Henry V's royal stonemason 'Thomas the mason and other stone cutters, fellows and servants of his...' for he had great 'affection' for the church.

Despite his rise in the Ricardian church, he continued to enjoy royal patronage under the Lancastrians. The new King Henry IV recalled him to the royal council in 1400, with a retainer salary of £100. He was made a prebendary of the York Minster (1404), and the King had promoted Prophet to secretary from 1402 to 1406. In late 1402 Prophet was sent with Lord Say as the King's representatives to inform Parliament that they could not expect to be called as a matter of right, nor without Henry's consent. But in November 1403 a papal release licence came from the Pope to allow Prophet to relinquish his deanery duties in Hereford. By 1404 Prophet held several prebendaries at Lincoln, Salisbury, York, and St Asaph's cathedrals, as well as Abergwili, Tamworth, and Crediton. Yet another prebendary, followed this time at Leighton Buzzard in the diocese of Lincoln in 1405. Nevertheless, he had to resign his portion of Upper Hall Ledbury when in 1407 he was collated Dean of York (until his death in 1416). He never fulfilled the ambition of building a chantry chapel there, but converted the old Dean's residence at Pocklington into a Tythe Barn and farmyard Ad fut rei mem eaque pro commodo, whilst simultaneously in December 1409 refurbished a house at Thornton for his own dwelling. "John Prophete of Pocklington" as he was known in the charters, was unusual not being an absentee. The Bishop's Peculiar Court had always been at Pocklington manor, when judging matters ecclesiastical in the 14th century, including blasphemy and breaches of the sabbath.

From 1406 he was the Keeper of the Privy Seal, retaining the confidence of Prince Hal when his father fell ill from 1411. One of his last meetings as Secretary was early in February 1415 when the Council met at the Blackfriars house in London. They discussed the certainty of war and the failure of negotiations to come. They would safeguard the seas and borders during the King's absence, and would repair the King's castle at Berwick. The Council wanted a full report into the state of the King's finances and expenditures since his coronation, only then could he make his voyage to France.

Transition of Henry IV's to Henry V's Court Officers
Name	Office held from 1413 and 1415
Henry Beaufort	Lord Chancellor of All England
Thomas, Earl of Arundel	Treasurer of the Royal Household
Sir Thomas Erpingham	Steward of the Royal Household
Sir Thomas More	Keeper of the Wardrobe
Sir Henry Fitzhugh	Chamberlain of the Royal Household
John Wodehouse	Chancellor of the Duchy of Lancaster
John Prophet	Keeper of the Privy Seal (1406–15)
John Wakeryng	Keeper of the Privy Seal (1415- )
Sir Roger Leche	Treasurer of the Royal Household (1415- )
John Stone	King's Secretary.

Prophet attended Henry V's disciplined court at Westminster with other officers of the royal household, particularly at key feast days in the Christian calendar, like Christmas. On 21 February 1415, the King's Council met to discuss the grave state of the nation's safety abroad: ambassadors had returned from Paris having failed to find a peace settlement with Charles VI, and there would be war. The council's advice had not altered since October 1414. But on Monday 3 June 1415, the last of Henry IV's courtiers was removed from office, and the sixty-year-old stepped aside. Yet when the fleet invaded in August, the complete victory was within the administration's grasp. Elusive for 200 years – it was achieved through naval control of the Channel, and a strong chain of military command and control. One of Prophet's last duties was to travel north for Henry V in 1416 to report on conditions in St Leonard's Hospital, a royal hospital outside Walmgate Bar, York.

On his death in 1416 he was buried in the parish church at Ringwood, Hampshire, in a church of which he had been rector. In 1410 he had built a chantry chapel there with Sir John Berkeley; a monumental brass marked his grave. His will was proven in 1418, where his executors included his nephew Master Thomas Felde, and Richard Rede, chaplain from Ringwood.

== See also ==
- Secretary of State (England)
- Lord Privy Seal
- Privy Councillor
- Dean of York
- Dean of Hereford
- Prebendary of Lincoln

Political offices
Preceded by Nicholas Bubwith	Lord Privy Seal; 1406–1415	Succeeded by John Wakering
