= Nicholas de Trinbey =

Prior of Llanthony Priory

- Prior of Llanthony Priory
- Elected: c. 1363
- Term ended: 8 February 1376
- Predecessor: Adam
- Successor: John Yatton

Personal details
- Died: After 1380

Nicholas de Trinbey (also Trilley, de Trinleye, Trillek, Trinbeye) was prior of Llanthony Priory in Wales from at least 1363 until his resignation on 8 February 1376.

In c. 1373 he was attacked by three canons of his priory, including John de Welyngton. Nicholas was blinded and his brother, John de Trinbey, was killed. He later "fled the monastery in fear" and retired, possibly to Llanthony Secunda. He was still alive in March 1380.

== Prior of Llanthony ==
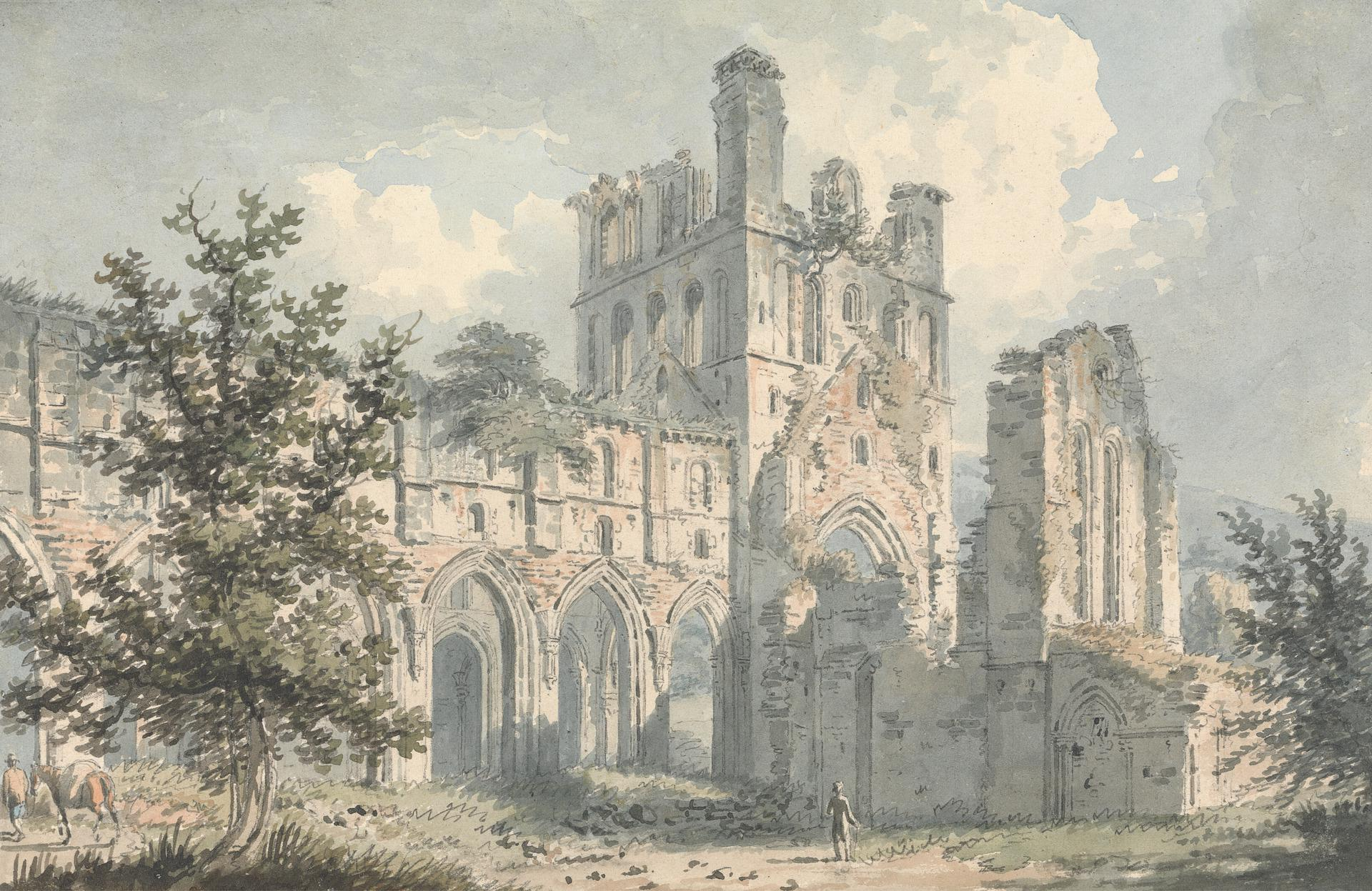
18th-century painting of Llanthony Priory by Edward Dayes

He is first recorded as prior on 12 February 1363, travelling to the priory's Irish holdings. In 1367 the priory lent Thomas Thurgum, a citizen of Hereford, £45 (£40,100 in 2025). This loan, and possibly similar acts, may have caused the canons of Llanthony Priory in what is now Monmouthshire, Wales, to become dissatisfied with him.

In September 1374 he obtained a promise from Llanthony Secunda Priory near Gloucester, for a "safe place" for the keeping of "books, vestments, and other goods" out of fear of trouble, and in March 1380 acknowledged that he had delivered to Secunda and received back "a great leather hamper containing cartularies and silver plate, together with a silver gilt cross with a silver staff made in two parts and a silver base; a small statue of silver made in the likeness of a regular canon, and also two small chests, locked and sealed".

=== 1373 attack and blinding ===
Nicholas de Trinbey had been accused by John de Welyngton of injuring him and having "wasted the goods of the priory". Probably on 4 August 1373 he and his brother John de Trinbey were attacked by de Welyngton and two other canons of Llanthony while Nicholas was saying the Office of the Dead. John de Trinbey was killed, and Nicholas was thrown to the ground and his eyes torn out.

In November 1373, the priory sought secular aid to apprehend the three attackers, whom it described as excommunicated apostates and vagabonds. Sometime after this Nicholas "fled the monastery in fear" and sought remedy from the Holy See.

A papal letter addressed to the bishop of Worcester, the abbot of Cirencester, and the prior of Stodeley charged them with investigating the affair. It instructed them that if found the attackers worthy of excommunication, they were not to be absolved until they had "made satisfaction and repaired to the Holy See for absolution". It recorded that Nicholas had "ruled the priory well for eleven years or thereabouts", and that after the attack he "dare not dwell within 40 miles of the priory and is ready to retire". He was granted a mandate to retire on 8 February 1376 and was succeeded by John Yatton.

The event is mentioned in a chronicle that was held by the Augustinian canons of Wigmore. The chronicle criticises Nicholas and refers to his "detestable life". In 1391 one of the canons, John de Welyngton, obtained a papal pardon for his involvement, which described the attack as a youthful mistake. By 1395 John was prior of Llanthony.

== Later life ==
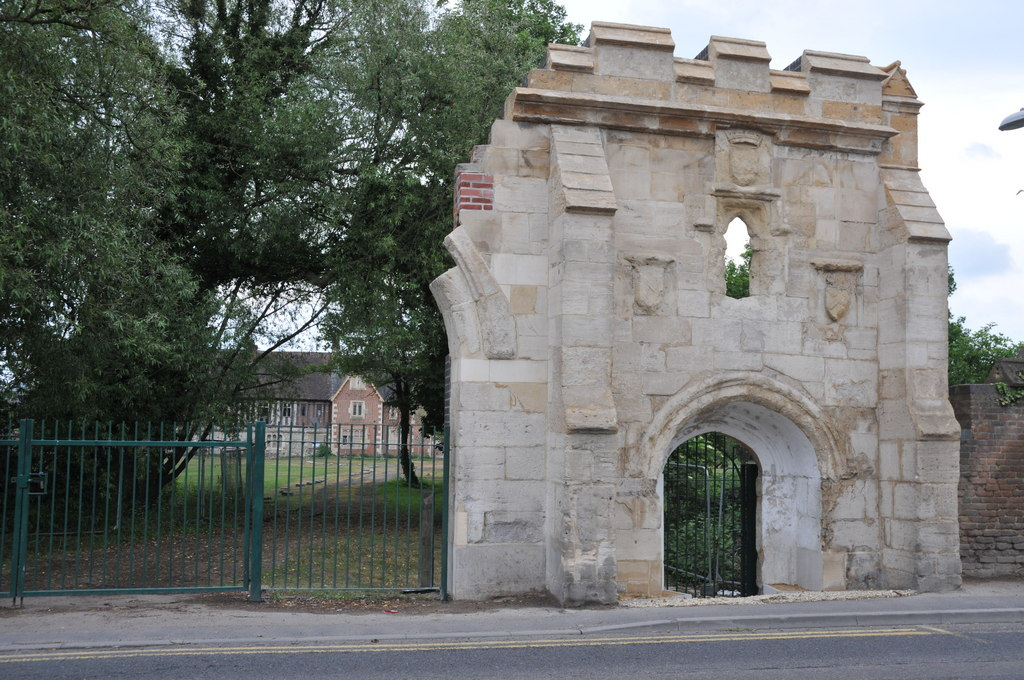
Ruined entrance to Llanthony Secunda Priory

Nicholas may have taken refuge at Llanthony Secunda, as on 6 April 1376 Llanthony Prima waived payment of an annual annuity of eight marks for as long as the former prior lived, to be used for his maintenance, and in March 1380 his successor John Yatton wrote that he had given Nicholas permission to retire to Secunda.

He was last recorded alive in March 1380.
