= John Yatton =

Prior of Llanthony Prima

- Prior of Llanthony Priory
- Elected: 1376
- Term ended: c. 1391
- Predecessor: Nicholas de Trinbey
- Successor: John de Welyngton

John Yatton (also John de Yatton) was prior of Llanthony Prima from 1376. He is last recorded in 1391.

== Prior of Llanthony ==
John Yatton was elected prior of Llanthony Prima in 1376, succeeding Nicholas de Trinbey. Nicholas had resigned after being attacked by three Llanthony canons, an assault in which he was blinded and his brother killed.

Llanthony Priory held property in Ireland, and during his term Yatton appointed attorneys to act there on his behalf. On 5 May 1376 he nominated John Doget for one year; existing letters had already appointed Philip Yeven for one year, and Raynald Dyare, a Llanthony canon, together with Thomas Chaumbre, for three years. On 6 February 1379 he appointed Gerald Vaghan and Richard Nassie for one year.

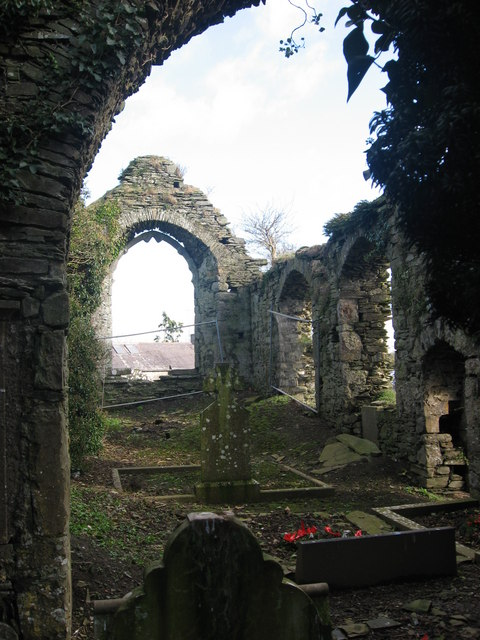
Ruins of Ardcath Church, Meath

He was nominated as an authorised representative for John de Bromwych, a knight who was travelling to Ireland on the king's business, for a year from 15 November 1379. In 1386 he was imprisoned for failing to provide the tithes he was charged with collecting to the king.

In 1391 he secured royal recognition from Richard II of the priory's rights to two Irish churches, Ardcath in the diocese of Meath and St Mary de Nelle in Dublin. For this the priory paid forty marks. This royal recognition was confirmed in 1400 by Henry IV on payment of five marks.

He was last recorded in office in 1391 and by 1395 had been succeeded by John de Welyngton, one of the canons who had attacked Nicholas de Trinbey.
