= Roger Walden =

15th-century Bishop of London, Archbishop of Canterbury, and Treasurer of England

- Archbishop of Canterbury
- Appointed: 8 November 1397
- Installed: unknown
- Term ended: 19 October 1399
- Predecessor: Thomas Arundel
- Successor: Thomas Arundel

Orders
- Consecration: never consecrated

Personal details
- Died: 6 January 1406
- Denomination: Roman Catholic

Roger Walden (died 1406) was an English treasurer and Bishop of London.

== Life ==
Little is now known of Walden's birth nor of his early years. He had some connection with the Channel Islands, and resided for some time in Jersey where he was rector of the Parish Church of St Helier from 1371 to 1378. He then held livings in Yorkshire and in Leicestershire before he became Archdeacon of Winchester in 1387. His days, however, were by no means fully occupied with his ecclesiastical duties, and in 1387 also he was appointed Treasurer of Calais, holding about the same time other positions in this neighbourhood.

In 1395, after having served Richard II as secretary, Walden became treasurer of England, adding the deanery of York to his numerous other benefices. On 8 November 1397 he was chosen Archbishop of Canterbury in succession to Thomas Arundel, who had just been banished from the realm, but he lost this position when the new king Henry IV restored Arundel in 1399, and after a short imprisonment he passed into retirement, being, as he himself says, "in the dust and under feet of men."

On 10 December 1405, through Arundel's influence, Walden was elected Bishop of London, and he died at Much Hadham in Hertfordshire on 6 January 1406. He was buried in St. Paul's Cathedral. An Historia Mundi, the manuscript of which is in the British Museum, is sometimes regarded as the work of Walden; but this was doubtless written by an earlier writer.

== Citations ==
Political offices
Preceded by John Waltham	Lord High Treasurer; 1395–1398	Succeeded by Guy Mone
Catholic Church titles
Preceded by Thomas Arundel	Archbishop of Canterbury; 1398–1399	Succeeded by Thomas Arundel
Preceded by Robert Braybrooke	Bishop of London; 1405–1406	Succeeded by Nicholas Bubwith
