= John Chandler (bishop) =

15th-century Bishop of Salisbury

- Bishop of Salisbury
- Elected: 15 November 1417
- Term ended: 16 July 1426
- Predecessor: Robert Hallam
- Successor: Robert Neville

Orders
- Consecration: 12 December 1417

Personal details
- Died: 16 July 1426
- Denomination: Catholic

John Chandler (or Chaundler) was a medieval Bishop of Salisbury.

Chandler became a resident canon at Salisbury in 1383 and was elected dean in 1404.

Chandler was first elected as bishop on 16 June 1407, but the election was quashed on 22 June 1407. He was elected again on 15 November 1417 and consecrated on 12 December 1417. He died on 16 July 1426.

A record of Chandler's work as Dean is the earliest and most complete medieval dean's register to survive at Salisbury. It includes detailed records and inventories from his visitations to each prebendal parish in 1405, 1408-9 and 1412.

== Citations ==
Catholic Church titles
Preceded by Robert Hallam	Bishop of Salisbury; 1417–1426	Succeeded by Robert Neville
