= Nicholas Bubwith =

15th-century Bishop of Bath and Wells, London, and Salisbury

- Bishop of Bath and Wells
- Appointed: 7 October 1407
- Term ended: 27 October 1424
- Predecessor: Henry Bowet
- Successor: John Stafford
- Previous posts: Bishop of London; Bishop of Salisbury

Orders
- Consecration: 26 September 1406

Personal details
- Born: 1355
- Died: 27 October 1424
- Denomination: Catholic

Nicholas Bubwith (1355-1424) was a Bishop of London, Bishop of Salisbury and Bishop of Bath and Wells as well as Lord Privy Seal and Lord High Treasurer of England.

Bubwith was collated Archdeacon of Dorset from 1397 - 1399 and again from 1400 - 1406. He was selected as Bishop of London on 14 May 1406 and consecrated 26 September 1406.

Bubwith was Lord Privy Seal from 2 March 1405 to 4 October 1406. He was Lord High Treasurer from 15 April 1407 to 14 July 1408. He also planned the building of St Saviour's Wells hospital but actual construction of the building started after his death.

Bubwith was translated to the see of Salisbury on 22 June 1407. As such, he participated in the Council of Constance together with Robert Hallam.

Bubwith was then translated to the see of Bath and Wells on 7 October 1407. He died 27 October 1424.

== Citations ==
Political offices
Preceded by Thomas Stanley	Master of the Rolls; 1402–1405	Succeeded by John Wakering
Preceded by Thomas Langley	Lord Privy Seal; 1405–1406	Succeeded by John Prophet
Preceded by Thomas Nevill, 5th Baron Furnivall	Lord High Treasurer; 1407–1408	Succeeded by John Tiptoft, 1st Baron Tiptoft
Catholic Church titles
Preceded by Roger Walden	Bishop of London; 1406–1407	Succeeded by Richard de Clifford
Preceded by Richard Mitford	Bishop of Salisbury; 1407–1407	Succeeded by Robert Hallam
Preceded by Henry Bowet	Bishop of Bath and Wells; 1407–1424	Succeeded by John Stafford
