= John Wakering =

15th-century Bishop of Norwich

- Bishop of Norwich
- Elected: c. 24 November 1415
- Term ended: 9 April 1425
- Predecessor: Richard Courtenay
- Successor: William Alnwick
- Other post: Lord Privy Seal (1415–1416)

Orders
- Consecration: 31 May 1416

Personal details
- Died: 9 April 1425
- Denomination: Roman Catholic

John Wakering (or Wakeryng; died 9 April 1425) was a medieval Bishop of Norwich.

Wakering was appointed Archdeacon of Canterbury from 1408, resigning in 1415.

Wakering was named Lord Privy Seal in June 1415 and dismissed from that office in July 1416.

Wakering was elected Bishop of Norwich about 24 November 1415 and was consecrated on 31 May 1416. He died on 9 April 1425.

His executors are named in 1433.

== Citations ==
Political offices
Preceded by Nicholas Bubwith	Master of the Rolls; 1405-1415	Succeeded by Simon Gauntsede
Preceded by John Prophet	Lord Privy Seal; 1415–1416	Succeeded by Henry Ware
Catholic Church titles
Preceded by Richard Courtenay	Bishop of Norwich; 1415–1425	Succeeded by William Alnwick
