= Robert Hallam =

English clergyman, Archbishop of York-elect in 1406

- Bishop of Salisbury
- Appointed: 1407
- Term ended: 4 September 1417
- Predecessor: Nicholas Bubwith
- Successor: John Chandler

Orders
- Consecration: 1407

Personal details
- Died: 4 September 1417
- Denomination: Roman Catholic

Rubbing from the tomb of Bishop Hallam, Constance Cathedral, at the foot of the steps to the high altar, to an English design. The text of hexameter verses, rhymed at end and middle, in the ledger lines is as follows: Subiacet hic stratus, Robert Hallum vocitatus; Quondam prelatus, Sarum sub honore creatus; Hic decretorum, doctor pacisque creator; Nobilis Anglorum, regis fuit ambasciator; Festum Cuthberti, Septembris mense vigebat; In quo Roberti, mortem Constantia flebat; Anno milleno, tricent octuageno; Sex cum ter deno, cum Christo vivat amoeno.

Robert Hallam (a.k.a. Alum or Halam; died 4 September 1417) was an English churchman, Bishop of Salisbury and English representative at the Council of Constance. He was Chancellor of the University of Oxford from 1403 to 1405.

Hallam was originally from Cheshire in northern England and was educated at Oxford University. As Chancellor he, the Proctors, and all others in the University were pardoned by King Henry IV. On leaving the chancellorship, he was nominated in May 1406 by Pope Innocent VII as Archbishop of York, but the appointment was vetoed by King Henry IV in the same year. However, in 1407 he was consecrated by Pope Gregory XII at Siena as Bishop of Salisbury. As bishop, Hallam supported various churches and shrines in his diocese with grants of episcopal indulgences.

At the Council of Pisa in 1409, Hallam was one of the English representatives. On 6 June 1411, Antipope John XXIII (Baldassare Cardinal Cossa) purported to make Hallam a pseudocardinal, but this title was not recognised.

At the Council of Constance, in November 1414, Hallam was the chief English envoy. There he took a prominent position, as an advocate of Church reform and of the superiority of the council to the pope. He played a leading part in the discussions leading to the deposition of Antipope John XXIII on 29 May 1415, but was less concerned with the trials of Jan Hus and Jerome of Prague. Sigismund, Holy Roman Emperor, through whose influence the council had been assembled, was absent during the whole of 1416 on a diplomatic mission in France and England; but when he returned to Constance in January 1417, as the open ally of the English king, Hallam as Henry V's trusted representative obtained increased importance, and contrived to emphasise English prestige by delivering the address of welcome to Sigismund. Afterwards, under Henry's direction, he supported the emperor in trying to secure a reform of the Church, before the council proceeded to the election of a new pope. This matter was still undecided when Hallam died suddenly on 4 September 1417. His executors were Masters Richard Hallum, John Fyton, John Hikke, with William Clynt, Thomas Hallum, Thomas Faukys, clerk, & Humfrey Rodeley

During the Council, alongside Nicholas Bubwith and Amedeo di Saluzzo, he ordered a Latin translation and commentary of Dante's Divine Comedy executed by Giovanni da Serravalle.

After Hallam's death the cardinals were able to secure the immediate election of a new pope, Martin V, who was elected on 11 November: it has been said that the abandonment of the reformers by the English was due entirely to Hallam's death; but it is more likely that Henry V, foreseeing the possible need for a change of front, had given Hallam discretionary powers which the bishop's successors used. Hallam himself had the confidence of Sigismund and was generally respected for his straightforward independence. He was buried in Constance Cathedral, where his tomb near the high altar is marked by a brass of English workmanship.

== Citations ==
Academic offices
Preceded by Philip Repyngdon	Chancellor of the University of Oxford; 1403–1405	Succeeded by Richard Courtenay
Catholic Church titles
Preceded by Thomas Langley	Archbishop of York election quashed 1406–1407	Succeeded by Henry Bowet
Preceded by Nicholas Bubwith	Bishop of Salisbury; 1407–1417	Succeeded by John Chandler
