= Guy Mone =

English politician and bishop (died 1407)

Guy Mone (Mohun) (died 1407) was an English royal administrator and bishop.

He held the offices of Receiver of the Chamber (1391 to 1398) and Master of the Jewel Office (1391 to 1398), Keeper of the Privy Seal (1396 to 1397) and Lord High Treasurer (1398) towards the end of the reign of Richard II of England, and was one of Richard's supporters.

He was bishop of St David's from 1397 to his death, being appointed on 30 August and consecrated on 11 November 1397.

== Notes ==
Political offices
Preceded by Edmund Stafford	Lord Privy Seal; 1396–1397	Succeeded by Richard Clifford
Preceded by Roger Walden	Lord High Treasurer; 1398–1398	Succeeded by William Scrope
Preceded by Henry Bowet	Lord High Treasurer; 1402	Succeeded by William de Ros, 6th Baron de Ros
Catholic Church titles
Preceded by John Gilbert	Bishop of St David's; 1397–1407	Succeeded by Henry Chichele
