= Grade II listed buildings in the City of London (EC4) =

The City of London is a major business and financial centre in London, England. It contains over 600 listed buildings that are recorded in the National Heritage List for England. Of these, over 400 are assessed to be at Grade II, the lowest grade. This list contains the Grade II listed buildings in the EC4 postal district of the city.

== Buildings ==
Name and location	Photograph	Date	Notes
15, New Bridge Street; 51.51284°N 0.10457°W		1900	The building is of earlier origins, however was substantially rebuilt in 1900. It consists of four storeys with ashlar dressings, an iron balcony lines the first floor, and the first and second-floor windows and linked by stone swags. The interior is decorated in a rich classical style.
Royal Bank of Scotland; 51.51219°N 0.08695°W	—	Mid to late 19th century	The long classical frontage to Nicholas Lane consist of three storeys of Portland stone, with a ground storey of rusticated stone, and mask keystone-topped segmentally arched windows; whilst the first floor has paired and corniced windows that are separated by columns of polished pink granite.
5, Pemberton Row; 51.51499°N 0.10828°W		Late 17th to early 18th century	Three-storey dwelling, now converted into offices. The ground floor is stuccoed, whilst the upper floors are of painted brick, and a red tiled mansard roof is set behind a parapet. A set of simple 18th-century wrought iron railings enclose the front area.
34-40, Ludgate Hill; 51.51407°N 0.10163°W		Mid-Victorian	A five-storey office building, with the ground floor containing modern shopfronts, and a centrally placed semi-circular recessed entrance, topped with an iron-railed semi-circular projecting balcony. Above the ground floor, the building is mainly of French Renaissance style, with each storey of nine bays.
Midland Bank; 51.51382°N 0.10251°W		1891	Originally built as a branch of City Bank, and later utilised by Midland Bank after its merger. The pale red brick and red terracotta building is of four storeys under a tiled roof. The ground floor is arched in grey granite, and a canted corner contains the main entrance with a polygonal turret and copper dome above.
29, Martin Lane; 51.51085°N 0.08754°W		1853	Stands on the site of the former St Martin Orgar church, which was destroyed in the Great Fire of London. Consists of a tower built into the side of a rectory, constructed from red brick with painted stucco dressings and quoins. The ground floor has a protruding arched porch of stucco, alongside a pair of round-headed windows with stucco architraves. The tower is of three plain stages with windows facing into the former churchyard. A large wooden bracketed clock protrudes from the front of the tower into Martin Lane.
1 Brick Court; 51.51277°N 0.11152°W		Early 20th century	Constructed in the early 20th century from red brick with Portland stone dressings, however of a 17th-century style. The four-storey block has a round-arched passageway to the west side, and an arcaded footpath to the east. The entrance is located centrally in the main elevation and contains a reused stone doorway.
Fountain Basin; 51.51200°N 0.11113°W		Late 17th century	A late 17th-century circular basin with a moulded curb of white marble.
Lamp Standard; 51.51200°N 0.11113°W		Early to mid-19th century	Lamp consisting of a cast iron pedestal topped with a square lantern.
Temple Gardens; 51.51157°N 0.11096°W		1878	The large Portland stone building was constructed in a 16th-century French chateau style, and consists of two blocks joined over an archway through the centre. A steep slate roof sits over the top of the four main storeys, and a set of rounded towers are set into the front corners.
Lodge at Entrance to Middle Temple Lane Lodge to Gateway From Victoria Embankment; 51.51118°N 0.11085°W		1880	Small, single-storeyed lodge of Portland stone. The building has channelled walls, arched windows, a small chimney stack, and a lead roof.
Pair of Lamp Standards; 51.51269°N 0.11210°W		Early to mid-19th century	A pair of elaborate cast iron standards with lanterns suspended from brackets.
Mitre Court Chambers; 51.51361°N 0.10946°W		Early 19th century	Five-storey building constructed from yellow brick with slight Portland stone dressings. It has a modern doorway and round-arched first-storey windows.
Adelaide House; 51.50919°N 0.08686°W		1924–25	Designed by Sir John Burnet and Thomas Tait, the steel-framed building of eleven storeys is situated next to the north end of London Bridge. It is faced in Portland stone and grey granite, less the rear elevation which is plainly built of yellow and white glazed brick. An order of pseudo-Doric columns line the low entrance with carved decoration mounted above.
Phoenix House; 51.51203°N 0.08817°W		1915	The office building consists of four main stone storeys, with the central portion recessed above the ground storey. The first floor is treated as a mezzanine with panelled piers in between the windows, which form pedestals for the order of columns that unite the second and third storeys. The building is topped by a balustraded parapet in the centre, and an attic storey at either end, whilst the main entrance is located centrally in the front elevation and is topped by a broken segmental pediment and bronze phoenix.
The Centre Page; 51.51246°N 0.09859°W		Mid-19th century	Public house including the numbers 29-33 Knightrider Street. The five storeys of no. 29 are of red brick construction with stucco window surrounds; whilst nos. 31-33 consists of three storeys of red brick, plus a mansard roof. No. 33 has a plain single-window return to Sermon Lane, with a large lantern mounted on the corner bearing the public house's former name Horn Tavern.
Vestry House; 51.51071°N 0.08874°W		Late 19th century	Of a red brick and stone construction, the late 19th century building has a stone doorcase surmounted by a foliage-carved pediment. There is an octagonal corner stair turrent with a point roof at the right-hand side.
5, Laurence Pountney Lane; 51.51036°N 0.08912°W		Late 18th century	The brick building is set back from the main street and accessed through an archway in a later building. It is laid out in an L-plan and consists of three storeys, a basement, and a slated mansard.
Rectory House; 51.51040°N 0.08863°W		Late 17th century	The building consists of four storeys, however the lowest one is part basement, and is built from red brick with storey bands, less the parapet which is of yellow brick. The ground floor of the east return has a simply pilastered shop front and corniced entrance door. 19th-century alterations to the building include a hood over the central doorway, enlargement of windows, and circular dormers to the slated, hipped roof.
The City Temple; 51.51707°N 0.10621°W		1873	A nonconformist church belonging to the United Reformed Church, all but the north elevation and south-west corner were rebuilt in the 1950s following WWII bombing damage. The north front is of a honey coloured stone construction, and consists of a two-storeyed Palladian distyle portico in the centre topped with a pedimented entablature, flanked by two single bays, with the right-hand carrying a two-stage tower. An octagonal drum surmounted by a copper cupola with a gilded cross sits atop the tower.
Gates With Gate Piers and Steps; 51.51241°N 0.11021°W		1730	Set of wrought iron gates flanked by a pair of Portland stone piers with carved urns atop. A set of curved steps to the south is included in the listing.
Gateway to Tudor Street; 51.51255°N 0.10846°W		1887	A Portland stone gateway that leads onto Tudor Street, including a separate arched carriage entrance and footway. Two storeys tall, a pair of lamp brackets are mounted on each side.
12 and 13 King's Bench Walk; 51.51165°N 0.10856°W		Early to mid-19th century	Four-storey barrister's chambers in plain, classical design of Bath stone, with a channelled ground floor. A pair of central bay windows stretches the full height of the building. Railings and lamp brackets are included in the listing.
4 Lamp Standards at North End; 51.51306°N 0.10913°W		Early 19th century	A set of four cast iron lamp standards with wrought iron decoration, set on square pedestals, with square lanterns on top.
1 and 2, Mitre Court Buildings; 51.51343°N 0.10931°W		Early to mid-19th century	Portland stone block of four storeys in a plain classical design, an arched passage dissects the centre of the building, leading to an elevation of plain yellow brick to the rear. The building's railings and gates are included in the listing.
82-85, Fleet Street / 9, Salisbury Court; 51.51383°N 0.10601°W		1935	Originally built as the head office for Reuters, the large simplified classical building has six storeys with a further three recessed above, and is faced in Portland stone. A large central arched entrance spans the bottom three storeys, with a bronze statue recessed above the doorway.
The Old Bell Public House; 51.51407°N 0.10527°W		Late 17th century	17th-century public house that has been much altered, three storeys tall under a tiled roof. The rear elevation to St Bride's Avenue is stuccoed with a simple shop front.
Mersey House; 51.51435°N 0.10645°W		1906	Built to house the London offices of the Liverpool Echo and Liverpool Daily Post. Five-storey building of Portland stone construction, less the ground floor which has a large semi-circular arch of grey granite, with a light screen infill of timber and glass. Upper three storeys have a shallow bow with mullioned and transomed windows.
143 and 144, Fleet Street; 51.51437°N 0.10710°W		1905	An elaborate gothic carved stone façade adorns the front of the building, with four storeys offices behind. The modern shopfront to the ground floor partially conceals the original stone surround, whilst above a pair projecting canted oriels rise through the upper three floors, containing a pair of stone mullioned sash windows at each level. A carved statue of Mary, Queen of Scots sits within a hooded niche at the first floor level, whilst a tiled roof with iron cresting sits atop the building.
Ye Olde Cheshire Cheese Public House; 51.51437°N 0.10721°W		Late 17th century	Of 17th-century origin, however the Fleet Street elevation is late 18th-century in nature, whilst the building was also remodelled and heightened in the 19th century. The four-storey public house is of yellow brick construction with red brick arches. The interior fittings are included in the listing, alongside a 17th-century vaulted cellar beneath the courtyard.
Phoenix Assurance Company; 51.51410°N 0.11037°W		1834	Elizabethan style office building for the Phoenix Assurance Company, with a later extension in the same style. Constructed from gault brick and Portland stone, the building is of mixed three and four storeys, with carved decoration.
Wrought Iron Gateway and Railing of Williamson's Tavern; 51.51331°N 0.09401°W		Early to mid-18th century	A pair of wrought iron gates and side panels stretching across Groveland Court.
29 Fleet Street; 51.51370°N 0.11024°W		1860	Built to a design by W. Gibbs Bartleet, the three-storey office building has a narrow frontage of Portland stone and red granite, with richly carved decoration. An elaborate dormer sits centrally in the attic, with a semi-circular pediment inlaid with a shell tympanum on top.
49 and 50, Fleet Street; 51.51387°N 0.10880°W		1911	The Portland stone office building now serves as a hotel, with the three main storeys having an extra attic storey atop the outer two bays at each end. A pair of arched entrances sit within the channelled ground floor, with the right-hand one leading through the building to Serjeant's Inn. An order of Ionic columns line the recessed centre of the upper two storeys, with pilasters at the end bays.
Aggra Bank Buildings; 51.51195°N 0.08675°W		Mid to late 19th century	Agra Bank offices currently occupied by Bank Tejarat, of three storeys, with the ground floor sat on a grey granite plinth. A round-headed doorway with renaissance motifs is set into the left-hand side, whilst above the first and second storeys are joined by an order of giant pilasters with windows in between.
St Clement's House; 51.51155°N 0.08669°W		Mid to late 19th century	A long three-storey frontage faces Clement's Lane, constructed from gault brick and Portland stone. Segmentally arched openings line the ground floor with marble pilasters separating, and carved mask keystones sat on top. A pair of pilastered and pedimented entrances, alongside a passage through to Lombard Court are present. A stone tablet commemorating Dositej Obradović is mounted on the building. The long plain returns to Lombard Court and St Clement's Court are of no interest to the listing.
The Gatehouse With Gateway and Screen Wall to West; 51.51427°N 0.11045°W		Early to mid-19th century	Built in Tudor style of yellow brick and stone. It is two storeys and a slated mansard to the south elevation, and three storeys to the north. The stone archway has a coat of arms emblazoned over, and a pair of old stone tablets are mounted in the wall dated 1682 and 1782.
Monument in Yard of Former Church of St John the Baptist, Wallbrook; 51.51162°N 0.09127°W		1884	Located on the site of the former parish church of St John the Baptist upon Walbrook, the monument is in three stages on a stepped base. It marks a communal burial place that was uncovered during the construction of the District Railway.
5, Crane Court; 51.51494°N 0.10911°W		c1670	Although the building was originally constructed in the 17th century, it was badly damaged by fire in 1971 and largely reconstructed, including the front and rear walls being entirely rebuilt, and the interior decorative plaster ceilings incorporating some of the original work. Three-storey, red brick construction, with a slight doorway to the front elevation surmounted by a flat hood. The rear elevation faces Red Lion Court and includes painted pilasters to the ground storey with coarsely carved frieze.
Blackfriars Bridge; 51.50982°N 0.10439°W		1869	19th-century bridge crossing the River Thames, consists of five shallow segmental arches or cast iron construction, with abutments of grey granite and piers of carved Portland stone. A gothic balustrade of grey granite lines the length of the bridge.
Statue of Captain John Smith; 51.51372°N 0.09394°W		1960	A bronze figure depicting John Smith, standing on a Portland stone plinth.
6-8, Bow Lane; 51.51320°N 0.09383°W		Mid-19th century	Polychrome brick commercial building with painted brick window detailing. The four storeys have a pair of shopfronts to the ground floor, with a central entrance leading through to no. 7, which is of no interest to the listing.
16 and 17, Bride Lane; 51.51364°N 0.10494°W		1840	Former St Bride and Bridewell Precinct School, the two-storey classical building is of yellow brick with Portland stone dressings. The front elevation is of three bay, the centre one set forward, with an entrance to the ground floor and bracketed pediment above the second storey. The east elevation is of five bays with each end slightly projecting forward.
2, Bridewell Place; 51.51334°N 0.10495°W		1885	Despite being built in the late 19th century, the three-storey red brick building is of a mid-17th-century style design. An arched entrance sits centrally in the front elevation with a circular window over, whilst a former second entrance sits to the right now blocked up. A modern roof story has been added to the top.
103, Cannon Street; 51.51175°N 0.08983°W		1866	The former Barclays Bank branch is of four storeys in Portland stone, of a Byzantine style with carved decoration and moulding. The arcaded ground storey is lined with polished pink granite shafts, with two-light windows to both the second and third floors. The rear elevation is plain of yellow brick with round arched windows, and a parapet before the roof.
115 and 117, Cannon Street; 51.51157°N 0.08907°W		Mid-19th century	Five-storey-tall commercial building of stone and black granite, with attached columns of red granite. The ground floor contains a pair of shopfronts, whilst the first to third storeys have an order of columns to each floor with simplified entablature above, less the third floor which has an elaborate entablature breaking forward over the columns. The fourth storey forms a prominent attic with carved detailing.
Carmelite House; 51.51175°N 0.10734°W		1898	Serving as the home of Associated Newspapers Ltd for over a century, the late 19th-century red brick building is accented with stone dressings and bands. The building is largely of five storeys, with a higher corner tower topped with an octagonal slate roof, lantern cupola, and flagstaff. The ground floor is sat on a blue brick plinth with banded brick piers, and a stone capital course of carved shells, sea gods, and monsters. A strapwork cornice and frieze stretches across the third storey with a plainer attic storey over, topped with a brick parapet and stone coping. An order of brick pilasters are carried up mounted with stone finials.
4-9 (Including 8A and 8B), Amen Court; 51.51483°N 0.10104°W		1879–80	Of a design by Ewan Christian, the range of houses are constructed from red brick in an early 17th-century design, and surround the north and east sides of Amen Court. An archway through the ground floor no. 8A leads to Warwick Lane and provides access to the court. The entire block is of three main storeys, with an additional in the roof, and no. 6 has a tower.
15, Abchurch Lane; 51.51180°N 0.08821°W		1914	The stone faced building was purpose-built for the Gresham Club, and is of three storeys, with a later addition of a glazed brick attic. The front elevation is of five bays, with left the two bays projecting and containing a segment-headed front door covered with a consoled hood.
Former Guildhall School of Music; 51.51219°N 0.10660°W		1885–87	Designed by Sir Horace Jones in order to house the Guildhall School of Music, with an addition in 1897. Consisting of three storeys of ashlar, the ground floor is rusticated with an entablature over, and an entrance sits centrally surmounted by an open rounded pediment. Either end of the front elevation slightly projects, with piers on the ground storey rising to corner pilasters on the upper floors.
Pair of dragons on pedestals at City boundary 51.51112°N 0.11157°W		1849	The dragons were removed from the Coal Exchange upon its demolishment in 1963, and are now mounted of modern pedestals of Portland stone, marking the boundary of the city with the City of Westminster.
Four Gate Piers to Middle Temple Lane; 51.51116°N 0.11075°W		Late 19th century	A set of four Portland stone piers surmounted by cast iron vases, separating a pair of single outer gates and central double gates, that lead to Middle Temple. The gates are of iron, and are emblazoned with Middle Temple motif roundels.
Five Gate Piers to Inner Temple Garden; 51.51116°N 0.10846°W		Late 19th century	A series of four pillars in between two outer gates and a set of large central gates, with a fifth set in the east corner of the gardens. The piers are constructed of Portland stone and have cast iron vases mounted on top. The spiked iron gates are adorned with motif roundels of the Inner Temple, to which the gates lead.
Hamilton House; 51.51139°N 0.10829°W		1898–1901	The ornamented, gabled building is constructed from Portland stone, and was designed by Sir William Emerson. It consists of four main storeys plus dormers.
Sion College and Attached Railings; 51.51135°N 0.10653°W		1886	Formerly housed Sion College, built in the late 19th century to a design by Sir Arthur Blomfield, the ground floor was extended in 1965–66 with a projecting block across the front of the return of no. 9, Carmelite Street. It is of red brick with stone dressings in a Tudor gothic style, and has irregular stories throughout. The central hall has a double height two-light traceried window extending through the first and second stories, with a cusped balustrade in front of a diaper patterned pediment on top. A buttress to the left-hand side terminates in a small octagonal tower with a domed roof, whilst a larger octagonal stair tower is to the right surmounted by a traciered belvedere and pointed roof. To the right-hand side of the extension, the original entrance has been converted into a three-light traceried window, with a pair of two-light windows on the storey above. The main entrance is now on the porch return, with an arch inset with carved masks and shields. The rear return is buttressed, and has a facetted stair tower set at a right angle. The attached wrought iron railings to the building are included in the listing.
Unilever House; 51.51167°N 0.10513°W		1930–32	Steel framed office building faced with Portland stone, serving as the head office of Unilever. Of a stripped classical style, the eight storey façade to Victoria Embankment follows the curve of the road, and has a rusticated ground floor with a central arched entrance flanked by a pair of smaller square-headed entrances. An order of free-standing unfluted Ionic columns run from the fourth through sixth storeys in between the metal-framed windows. The seventh storey appears as a parapet pierced with windows, above a strongly marked cornice. Further entrances at either end of the main block have sculptural groups by Sir William Reid Dick above.
Five Seats on Riverside Pavement Opposite Temple Gardens; 51.51093°N 0.11089°W		Late 19th century	A set of cast iron benches with wooden slats. The end supports are shaped to be crouching camels.
1, Wardrobe Place; 51.51301°N 0.10091°W		Early 19th century	Stuccoed building with front elevation, including former shopfront, to Carter Lane. It has three storeys plus a slated mansard roof, and a footway leads through the ground floor towards Wardrobe Place. The elevation to Wardrobe Place is plain and of four full storeys.
Wardrobe House and Adjoining Archway; 51.51271°N 0.10098°W		Late 19th century	The building is three storeys tall, of red brick with moulded brick enrichment and painted stone dressings. A central doorcase adorns the ground floor, flanked by Ionic pilasters supporting a pedimented cornice above. A further arched entrance is at the right-hand side, with a semi-circular headed door, surrounded by a red brick arch and moulded jambs.
Cutlers' Hall; 51.51554°N 0.10097°W		1884	Serving as the Worshipful Company of Cutlers, the two-storey building is of a simplified late 16th-century style. Red brick construction, with pink sandstone dressings, topped with a plain parapet in front of a slated roof inset with small dormers. A richly carved doorway serves as the entrance, flanked by a pair of iron lamp brackets, and with a coat of arms and hanging sign above. A secondary entrance is located at the right-hand side, laid into an polygonal projection. A frieze of terracotta figures by George Tinworth line the top of the ground storey.
Remains of Undercroft Beneath Pavement at Rear of Numbers 68 to 72 (Even) Queen Victoria Street; 51.51275°N 0.09294°W	—	14th century	Rubble walls and lower parts of vault situated under no. 34 Watling Street.
Gate Piers to Churchyard of Church of St Stephen, Wallbrook; 51.51264°N 0.08957°W		Mid-19th century	Situated at the entrance to St Stephen Walbrook, a set of four stone piers with fluted ashlar frieze and pedimented caps. Alongside a pair of wrought iron gates, low stone walls, and modern wrought iron railings.
Obelisk in Centre of Roadway; 51.51350°N 0.10634°W		1833	A grey granite obelisk erected in memory of Robert Waithman.
Telephone House; 51.51156°N 0.10786°W		c1900	Four-storey free classical office building of Portland stone, with carved and moulded enrichments. It has a long frontage to Temple Avenue with two short returns.
Albert Buildings; 51.51239°N 0.09295°W		1871	A 19th-century office building occupying part of a triangular island site, with the main and return elevations being continuous due to rounded corners. The four-storey Italian gothic façade is of painted stone construction and consists of an uninterrupted series of identical bays; the only variation being a five-bay section on the Queen Victoria Street elevation, which has an extra storey. The ground floor contains a series of shopfronts of two bay width each, separated by piers with foliated caps. The additional storey to the raised centre has deeply recessed balconettes within the arch-headed windows, and crowned by a cornice nearly identical to that of the rest of the building.
68-72, Queen Victoria Street; 51.51270°N 0.09291°W		c1870	Stone-faced office building, with shopfronts to the ground floor separated by pilasters; no. 70 possibly retains its original shopfront. The first and second storeys are united, with channelled pilaster strips stretching between both, and the third floor is treated as an attic storey with a dentil cornice below. A pierced balustrade crowns the top of the façade, interrupted by a central stone dormer, behind which is a slated roof.
74-82, Queen Victoria Street; 51.51270°N 0.09291°W		c1870	Classical three-storey building, with an additional attic and dormered roof storey. The ground floor to Queen Victoria Street contains shopfronts separated by pilasters, whilst the first and second storeys are united with rusticated pilaster strips. The far left and right windows of the first floor are surmounted by bracketed triangular pediments, whilst the central window is topped with a broken segmental pediment emblazoned with City coat of arms. The slated mansard roof contains a series of pedimented dormers, pierced by a prominent corner stack.
8, Red Lion Court; 51.51487°N 0.10885°W		19th century	Narrow stock brick building situated on a corner plot, consisting of two bays on the longer elevation, a canted corner, and a single bay on the short return. Four storeys tall, the ground floor is rendered.
The Rectory; 51.51256°N 0.10129°W		Late 18th century	18th-century rectory for St Andrew-by-the-Wardrobe, consisting of three storeys of yellow brick construction. To the left-hand side is a pedimented doorcase flanked by Doric columns, with a fanlight over. The south corner has a modern first floor oriel projecting out. The railings and lamp arch to the front elevation are included in the listing.
Lodge St Andrew's Court House Vicarage Wall and Gatepiers to Garden of Number 7 (St Andrew's Court House) And Vicarage; 51.51699°N 0.10666°W		1870	Serves as the vicarage and offices for the church of St Andrew Holborn. The court house is a yellow stock brick building with stone dressings, and accentuating purple brick arches over the windows. The elevation into the courtyard is of two storeys, with four bays separated by prominent buttresses. A projecting stair wing is present with a rounded end, and steep conical slated roof. The return facing St Andrew Street has a gable end with a broken roofline. The gable contains a stone statue of St Andrew, and a door is located to the left-hand side. The vicarage has a courtyard elevation of two storeys with an additional attic storey. The irregular façade contains gables, dormers, and canted bay windows, and a diagonal corner bay turns the façade through 90 degrees. A gabled brick porch topped by a painted stone arch projects from the diagonal bay. The lodge is a stock brick, single storey building with a slated roof and large central stack. Listing contains the stock brick facing St Andrew Street, with two pairs of piers topped with stone caps.
Statue of Queen Anne in Forecourt of St Paul's Cathedral; 51.51368°N 0.09995°W		1886	White marble statue depicting Anne, Queen of Great Britain, situated in the forecourt of St Paul's Cathedral. The statue sits on a base of Portland stone, with a seated symbolic figure located at each corner, and the royal arms mounted to the front. The stepped base is surrounded by a cast iron railing. It is a copy of an original by Francis Bird, which suffered extensive weathering damage.
12, Bridewell Place / 13, New Bridge Street; 51.51308°N 0.10454°W		1873	The building consists of four storeys plus a slated mansard, it is of gault brick construction with stucco dressings. A shopfront is present on the shorter return to New Bridge Street.
129, Cannon Street; 51.51142°N 0.08851°W		1899	A narrow four-storey building of red brick and Portland stone, with a three-storey bay window adorned with carved decoration above a later shopfront. The plain rear elevation is of no interest to the listing.
Rising Sun Public House; 51.51307°N 0.10142°W		Early to mid-19th century	Situated on a corner plot, the public house is three storeys tall, and constructed from gault brick and stucco. The pilastered ground storey is lined with a set of engaged Ionic columns in between partly altered glazing. The first floor is adorned with corniced and pedimented windows, with those on the floor above being plainer.
81, Carter Lane; 51.51327°N 0.10266°W		Late 17th century	Stuccoed three-storey building, with a continuous dormer set into the roof, shopfront to the ground floor, and passageway leading to a courtyard behind.
19 and 20, College Hill; 51.51135°N 0.09215°W		Mid-19th century	The building is of the Italianate style, stuccoed, and of two storeys and an attic. The ground floor is channelled, with recessed entrances at either end; that to no. 19 flanked by piers, and no. 20 by pilasters. The rear elevation is also stuccoed. Part of the premises may date to an earlier point.
Pair of Towers at Cannon Street Station Western Tower to Cannon Street Station; 51.50938°N 0.09165°W		1865–66	A yellow brick tower, forming one of a pair that mark the junction of the Cannon Street station train shed with the railway bridge. The lower stage of the tower is channelled, with the upper containing open arches. The tower is topped by a square, domed roof, with a squat lantern and spire.
78-81, Fetter Lane; 51.51731°N 0.10951°W		1902	Of a design by Treadwell & Martin, the building has a stone frontage in modified Flemish gothic style, adorned with carved decoration. It consists of five storeys, with two of these being contained within a large gable, topped by a slated roof that is crowned by a pair of crouching figures supporting a shell pediment. The ground storey has been altered with a wide central opening, containing a shop front, flanked by two narrower openings.
13 and 14, Fleet Street; 51.51363°N 0.11112°W		Mid-19th century	Originally built as a branch of the Union Bank of London, the classical building consists of four storeys and an attic, and is of Portland stone construction. The ground floor has a pair of engaged Tuscan columns, with quoins lining the full height of the party walls. The first-floor windows are crowned with bracketed cornices, the second-floor windows have plain cornices, and the top two storeys have simple moulded surrounds.
Ye Olde Cock Tavern; 51.51370°N 0.11050°W		1912	Narrow 20th-century public house fronted in painted roughcast, with a wide central arched entranceway to the ground floor. It consists of four storeys, plus a further attic storey in a half-timbered gable, topped with a steep tiled roof. A timber construction oriel window projects at first floor level, mounted with a hanging sign on a wrought iron bracket. The building contains a 17th-century stone chimneypiece, flanked by enriched terminal pilasters, and with an oak overmantle.
The Masters House; 51.51296°N 0.10969°W		Mid-20th century	Serving as the official residence of the Master of the Temple, it is a facsimile reconstruction of a building built in 1667 that was destroyed during WWII. It is of red brick and Portland stone construction, and consists of three storeys plus a dormer in the tiled roof. The centrally located entrance is crowned by a bracketed segmental pediment. The building is topped by a modillion eaves cornice, and a large pediment is present over the central three bays.
2 Lamp Standards Outside Inner Temple Hall; 51.51269°N 0.10995°W		Early 19th century	Located outside Inner Temple Hall, the pair of cast iron standards are mounted on square pedestals and adorned with wrought iron decoration. Square lanterns of a later date are atop the standards.
Doctor Johnson's Buildings; 51.51359°N 0.11066°W		1858	A four-storey gault brick block with a rusticated stone ground floor, and stone window surrounds. Designed by Sydney Smirke, the eleven bays are symmetrically composed with a centrally located entrance, with a rusticated stone surround, keystone, and cornice, and a pair of two-bay projections either side. A series of cast iron bracketed gas lamps are present on the ground floor, whilst a stone cornice with a brick blocking course over tops the building. The elevation to Hare Court is of yellow stock brick with gauged brick arches, stone string course and cornice.
1-4, Paper Buildings; 51.51234°N 0.10952°W		Mid-19th century	Four storeys tall, with a further part-basement storey, the gault brick and Portland stone building is of a plain, classical design. It has simple pilastered entrances to the ground floor, and area railings surrounding.
Lamp Standard Opposite 7 King's Bench Walk; 51.51245°N 0.10908°W	—	Early 19th century	An elaborate wrought iron standard mounted on a Portland stone base and topped with a square lantern of later origin.
Railings, Stone Wall and Gates to Former Churchyard of St Martin Orgar; 51.51076°N 0.08766°W		Mid-19th century	Enclosing the front of the former churchyard of the church of St Martin Orgar, it includes a set of heavy cast iron railings with turned shafts and spearhead finials, on top of a slightly curved stone wall.
1 and 2, Garden Court; 51.51216°N 0.11199°W		1885	Large Neo Elizabethan red brick block with stone dressings. The building consists of four main storeys plus an attic, with the east elevation having eight gable bays topped by identical triangular gables containing attic windows. A set of four three-storey canted bay windows topped with battlements, are situated at the centre two and terminal bays. The entrances are located in a set of four centred arches, and the roof is tiled with a number of large grouped chimney stacks with prominent oversailing courses. The end returns of the building are also gabled, with a further wide battlemented canted bay window to the south end.
2 and 3 Hare Court; 51.51321°N 0.11133°W		1894	Of a design by Sir Thomas Graham Jackson, the building is constructed from red brick with Portland stone dressings. It has four storeys and an attic. The elevation to Hare Court contains a pair of conjoined curved bay windows, which are flanked by projecting entrance bays inset with rubbed brick pedimented doorways. The four projecting bays are topped with Dutch gables, and the rest of the tiled roof is lined with pedimented dormers. A pair of wrought iron bracketed gas lamps are mounted to the entrance bays. The elevation facing Middle Temple Lane is symmetrically composed above the ground floor level, with pilastered oriels to the first and second storeys.
146 Queen Victoria Street; 51.51224°N 0.10080°W		1866	Currently occupied by the Church of Scientology, the four-storey building is located on a corner plot and is constructed from Portland stone. The entrance is located on the front elevation between the basement and ground storey level, and is flanked by pilasters supporting a bracketed balcony. The upper storeys are lined with broad pilasters, with a line of three balconies projecting from the centre three bays of the second storey. The rear elevation is plain and of yellow brick and stone.
The Cockpit Public House; 51.51271°N 0.10146°W		c1860	Public house of brick construction with stucco dressings. Laid out over three storeys in a triangular plan with a rounded corner, the ground floor pub front has leaded windows separated by tapering pilasters, topped by low clerestory windows. The upper windows are mullioned and transomed, with a brick parapet interrupted by a balustrade crowning the building. A small shaped gable rises over the rounded corner, and octagonal chimney stacks also rise from the roof.
Pump on West Side of Chapter House; 51.51428°N 0.09923°W	—	1819	A cast iron handpump stood over a trough. It is inscribed with the lettering Erected by St Faith's Parish 1819, and was formerly located against the railings of St Paul's Churchyard, having been moved to its current position in 1973.
St Paul's Cross; 51.51422°N 0.09772°W		1910	A large Doric column of Portland stone mounted on a base with four consoles and crouching figures of children, on top of which is a bronze figure of Saint Paul. The monument is enclosed by a stone wall and gate. The monument was designed by Sir Reginald Blomfield, with the statue being the work of Sir Bertram Mackennal.
Former offices of YRM; 51.51627°N 0.10992°W		1961	The building was designed by Yorke Rosenberg Mardall as their own headquarters, and consists of a reinforced concrete frame externally faced with horizontally coursed white tiles. The building has six storeys, with the lower two forming a broad podium for the upper four to sit on set back. A flight of external steps at the elevation facing Greystoke Place leads to the entrance to the first floor lobby, whilst the current main entrance is via later doorway and steps at the south elevation. The building is lined with double glazed, timber-cased windows arranged in bands. Inside, the original staircase and lift shaft are extant.
Number 16 and Attached Railings, Took's Court; 51.51670°N 0.11109°W		c1720	The three-storey dwelling was re-fronted in the 19th century with yellow stock brick. The front elevation is two bays wide, with a pound-arched doorway surmounted with a modern radial fanlight, situated to the left-hand side. Wrought iron balconies are present to the ground and first storey windows. The interior retains some original panelling, alongside the staircase, and a round-backed cupboard. The attached cast iron railings with urn finials are included in the listing.
Number 14 and Attached Railings, Took's Court; 51.51681°N 0.11109°W		c1720	Brown brick terraced house with red brick dressings and tiled mansard roof inset with dormers. Three storeys tall, with a further attic storey, a pair of Ionic pilasters rise the full height of the building. The entranceway consists of a wooden doorcase topped with a segmental headed oblong fanlight, and is surrounded by a pair of rusticated pilasters supporting a segmental pediment above. The attached cast iron railings are included in the listing.
K2 Telephone Kiosk; 51.51132°N 0.10410°W		c1927	K2 type public telephone kiosk as designed by Sir Giles Gilbert Scott. Consists of a square kiosk of cast iron painted in red, topped with a domed roof, and with perforated crowns adorning the top panel on each face.
Tipperary Public House; 51.51401°N 0.10757°W		c1667	Stuccoed brick public house of four storeys, with a 20th-century pub front to the ground floor. The upper windows are square headed and architraved, and the interior has a turned baluster staircase extant, from the second floor upwards.
K2 Telephone Kiosk at Junction With Queen Street; 51.51175°N 0.09259°W		c1927	K2 type public telephone kiosk as designed by Sir Giles Gilbert Scott. Consists of a square kiosk of cast iron painted in red, topped with a domed roof, and with perforated crowns adorning the top panel on each face.
K2 Telephone Kiosk Outside St Dunstan's Court, Fetter Lane; 51.51476°N 0.10978°W		c1927	K2 type public telephone kiosk as designed by Sir Giles Gilbert Scott. Consists of a square kiosk of cast iron painted in red, topped with a domed roof, and with perforated crowns adorning the top panel on each face. It was moved to its current location in 2012.
K2 Telephone Kiosk; 51.51482°N 0.10895°W		c1927	K2 type public telephone kiosk as designed by Sir Giles Gilbert Scott. Consists of a square kiosk of cast iron painted in red, topped with a domed roof, and with perforated crowns adorning the top panel on each face.
K2 Telephone Kiosk, Outside Church of St Aldermary; 51.51284°N 0.09328°W		c1927	K2 type public telephone kiosk as designed by Sir Giles Gilbert Scott. Consists of a square kiosk of cast iron painted in red, topped with a domed roof, and with perforated crowns adorning the top panel on each face.
K2 Telephone Kiosk By Submarine Memorial; 51.51088°N 0.11080°W		c1927	K2 type public telephone kiosk as designed by Sir Giles Gilbert Scott. Consists of a square kiosk of cast iron painted in red, topped with a domed roof, and with perforated crowns adorning the top panel on each face.
Police Public Callbox, Corner of Friday Street and Queen Victoria; 51.51205°N 0.09602°W		c1935	Constructed from cast iron, the rectangular police public call box has a segmented arched head with a narrow projecting hood. A globular light sits on top encased in a small, flat-topped cupola on a stepped base. The front face of the box consists of a set of instructions set behind a door with a glass face, with an opening name plate and embossed coat of arms above. There are 2 further flush doors beneath.
Police Public Callbox 10 Metres East of War Memorial; 51.51089°N 0.11050°W		c1935	Constructed from cast iron, the rectangular police public call box has a segmented arched head with a narrow projecting hood. A globular light sits on top encased in a small, flat-topped cupola on a stepped base. The front face of the box consists of a set of instructions set behind a door with a glass face (replaced), with an opening name plate and embossed coat of arms above. There are 2 further flush doors beneath.
Police Public Callbox Outside Mansion House; 51.51286°N 0.08981°W		c1935	Constructed from cast iron, the rectangular police public call box has a segmented arched head with a narrow projecting hood. A globular light sits on top encased in a small, flat-topped cupola on a stepped base. The front face of the box consists of a set of instructions set behind a door with a glass face (replaced), with an opening name plate and embossed coat of arms above. There are 2 further flush doors beneath.
St Brides Foundation Institute and Library; 51.51344°N 0.10505°W		1893–94	Originally constructed in the late 19th century, the educational institute has some 20th-century modifications, including the conversion of the pool into a theatre in 1994. The building is constructed from red brick with red sandstone dressings, with a steeply pitched tiled roof behind a parapet. It is irregularly composed, with a return of ten bays ending in a rounded corner, followed by a further two bays, and has a mix of two and three storeys throughout. Two entrances adorn the main elevation topped with curving open pediments, with a further to the curved right-hand bay. The ground floor has a series of round headed windows, whereas the upper floor has square-headed architraved windows. Inside the building, a robust structural frame is extant in order to support the load requirements of printing machinery upstairs. Alongside this, the former reading retains a strapwork plaster ceiling, dado panelling, and pilasters between the windows; the former pool located in the basement has some original wooden changing cubicles and a pair of galleries with cast iron balustrades, supported by cast iron columns. Furthermore, the former basement laundry retains drying rack tracks, the board room has a 17th-century-style chimneypiece, the library has original glass-fronted bookcases and a pair of over-door roundels containing reliefs of John Passmore Edwards and William Blades, and the entrance hall has a marble foundation plaque over the entrance, alongside a bust of Samuel Richardson donated to the institute in 1901.
3, Fleet Street; 51.51358°N 0.11164°W		Mid to late 18th century	Former dwelling, now serving as offices and a shop, with mid-19th-century alterations and a c1912 shop. The narrow, four-storey building is of Flemish bond brick construction with stucco quoining and dressings, topped by a tiled mansard roof. The shopfront has a pair of doors flanking a central square bay window, and continues to the first floor, where a pair of 18th-century panelled shutters sit either side of a large window. Two three-light windows adorn the second and third storeys, and are set stuccoed square-headed architraves with moulded cornices. Inside, is a well-preserved shop interior with bolection panelling to the cabinets, drawers, and counter, alongside a stained glass window at the rear.
Britannia House; 51.51605°N 0.10250°W		1912	Office building built for the London, Chatham and Dover Railway Company, constructed from Portland stone with copper flashings and enrichments to the Westmorland slate mansard roof. The building is of a rectangular plan over four main storeys and an attic storey. The main entrance is located centrally in the Old Bailey elevation and is surmounted by a broken pediment adorned with figures depicting rail and sea travel. A series of rusticated piers and pilasters separate the ground-floor windows, terminating in a plain entablature at first floor level. The mansard roof has a series of square-headed dormer windows, above which is a further line of semi-circular dormers. The side elevations are similar and of two bays each. The interior was remodelled in the late 20th century and again in the early 21st, whilst the range to the rear is of no interest to the listing.
Retaining Wall and Railings With Overthrows, Gate and Letter Boxes to Pountney Churchyard; 51.51056°N 0.08864°W		Late 18th century	The listing includes the retaining wall and railings, gate, and letter boxes surrounding the churchyard of the former parish church of St Laurence Pountney. The retaining wall is of pink and yellow brick, and varies in height between 0.5m and 2m depending on the slope of the ground. It is topped by a wrought iron railing, with square bars and spiked finials, with two separate 'L' shaped sections lined by an overthrow. The overthrows have decorative scrollwork and lamp holders, whilst the gate is of a plain design. A double letter box of c1870s design is mounted within a section of the railings;
1, King William Street; 51.51215°N 0.08861°W		1921–22	Built as the head office of the London Assurance Company, the five-storey, triangular building is of Portland stone over a stell frame, that is channelled at ground floor level and ashlar dressed at the upper levels. A slated mansard roof lined with stepped dormers tops the building. A semi-basement is present beneath the ground storey inset with large metal framed windows fronted by cast iron railings. The ground floor openings are architraved with festooned console keystones, with recessed metal framed windows. At first floor level, a plain band supports a series of giant pilasters that rise to fourth floor level, terminating with the main entablature. The windows to the first floor are smaller than other storeys, giving a mezzanine effect, with each having a small balustraded balcony in front. The main entrance to the building is located on the corner of St Swithin's Lane, consisting of a hexagonal ante-porch with openings on three sides. A series of steps lead up inside the entrance and a ceiling with sunken dome is above. At the opposite corner, a pilastered two-storey rotunda sits atop the main building, and is capped by a copper dome resting on enriched copper brackets.
24, Tudor Street; 51.51261°N 0.10667°W		Early 19th century	A large detached house, with projecting 20th-century shopfronts added to the ground floor. The building is of four main storeys with a further attic storey in the felted mansard roof, it is faced with stucco and has quoins on the corners. A parapet surrounds the top of the building, with a shallow pediment located above the central bay. The return elevation is of a similar nature, less the ground floor is slightly recessed with Doric engaged columns flanking a further 20th-century shopfront. Inside has been altered, with a later 19th-century staircase to the first and second storeys, and an early 19th-century staircase to the upper storeys.
9, Carmelite Street; 51.51139°N 0.10676°W		1893–94	The office block was constructed in order to house the Board of Conservators of the River Thames and is of red brick with stone dressings in the Tudor gothic style. The five storeys are topped with a slate roof with tall brick chimneys. The ground floor single window return to Victoria Embankment is obscured due to a 20th Century extension to Sion College; above this, a double-height traceried oriel window is present at the first and second floor level, alongside a small window and figurative finial to the gable. A central gothic entrance is located on the main elevation, consisting of a moulded ogee arch inset with carved stone masks and armorial devices, in which is a set of double panelled doors surmounted by a traceried fanlight. To the left of this is a wide elliptical arch covered with a wrought iron screen and gate, that leads to the basement entrance. Most of the windows are square-headed, transomed, and mullioned; some are pointed, and some are pointed with cusped heads. The end two bays on each side are slightly projecting, the right-hand side one bearing a pair of double height windows at first and second floor level, whilst a cartouch dated to 1893 sits above at fourth floor level.
7, Wine Office Court; 51.51492°N 0.10736°W		1868–70	Four-storey office building which served as the first home of the Press Association between 1870 and 1892. Constructed from stock brick with stone dressings, the terraced building three bays wide, with the central bay being narrower. The central entrance consists of a four panelled door under a plain fanlight, encased in an incised moulded surround, topped with a keystone and console-bracketed cornice. The door is flanked by a pair tripartite windows separated by thin barley-sugar columns with tiny Ionic capitals four-centred arches. The ironwork fencing to the front elevation is included in the listing. Inside, the foyer contains a deep cornice, inner archway, and timber and glass screen.
Southwark Bridge; 51.50883°N 0.09411°W		1913–21	A road and foot bridge designed by Sir Basil Mott, Bt., less the piers and turrets to the design of Sir Ernest George. A series of five steel arches are supported by rusticated granite piers in a classical design.
Hoop and Grapes Public House; 51.51542°N 0.10501°W		c1720	Originally constructed as a four-storey terraced house, the building was converted into a public house in c1832. It was further altered following WWII damage, when it was re-faced in multi-coloured stock brick and red brick dressings, and the double-pitched roof had its pegged and numbered timbers replaced with tiles. The ground floor pub front is of 20th-century origin also, however the upper storeys retain early 19th-century sash windows with gauged red brick flat arches. Interior was much altered during the 20th century; however, a c. 1830 staircase is extant at the ground floor level, and an original dog-leg stair to the first floor. Upper floors also retain some original doorframes and a plain panelled door, with some later partitioning present. 17th-century brick vaults, believed to originally be warehousing vaults for the Fleet canal are present in the basement.
90-94, Fleet Street; 51.51400°N 0.10541°W	—	1900	An office building of red brick and stone dressings construction with shops to the ground floor. The building has five main storeys, plus an additional attic storey in the steeply pitched tiled roof. The ground storey is stone clad and contains two 19th-century shopfronts, separated by a central round-headed, moulded arched entrance, with a gothic style traceried canopy over. The upper floors have a pair of mullioned and transomed canted bay windows to the end bays, whilst the inner bays have paired segmental windows in semi-circular headed reveals. The central fourth-floor windows are recessed behind an order of Ionic columns, and is crowned by a gable flanked by a pair of gabled dormers.
Northcliffe House; 51.51273°N 0.10731°W		1925–26	Formerly housing the printing office of Associated Newspapers Ltd, the large four-storey office building is of a steel frame construction that is clad in stone. A corner entrance is located at the junction of Tudor Street and Whitefriars Street, and consists of a square-headed doorway with a prominent keystone mounted above. The first through third floors are united by a series of giant Ionic pilasters, with lion head masks mounted to the capitals, that separated metal framed windows- those to the first and second floors also united by continuous mullions. A fluted coved cornice in a neo-Egyptian design is mounted above the third floor, and a recessed attic storey sits above
Drinking Fountain on East Side of Road at North End of Bridge; 51.51136°N 0.10410°W		1861	A public drinking fountain consisting of a circular granite bowl on top of a baluster base, on which a bronze figure of the Woman of Samaria is mounted.
31-32, St Andrew's Hill; 51.51246°N 0.10154°W		Late 19th century	Late 19th-century warehouse now converted into a public house. Four-storey rounded-corner building of Flemish bonded red brick with stone and artificial stone dressings. No. 32 is separated from no. 31 by a full-height hoist bay, with a second at the far right end. The ground storey windows are located in flat-arched openings separated by brick piers, with composite capitals and stucco faced Tuscan antae. Whereas all upper-floor windows are segmental arched with gauged brick lintels. There are four entrances present across the building, and a number of hoists remain mounted to the exterior of the building.
The Punch Tavern and Offices Above; 51.51405°N 0.10492°W		1894–97	Public house and shops with three storeys of offices over, situated on a corner plot and built in the Jacobean revival style. Standing on the site of an earlier pub, the current building was rebuilt in stages by Saville and Martin between 1894 and 1897, from polished granite and glazed terracotta to the ground floor, and red brick in mixed bonds with stone dressings to the upper storeys. The main entrance to the pub is topped with a lintel with an original sign supported by faience pilasters, and shopfronts to the side of these. To the right-hand side, around the corner, an entrance to the upper floors is located surmounted by a pair of overlights. A three-storey extension to the rear has a frontage of polished granite and wood, bearing the name Crown and Sugar Loaf- the original name of the public house. Inside, just past the entrance vestibule, a barrel vaulted skylight is present in the roof alongside a further skylight over the bar; the wall panelling and much of the bar are also original, as well as the acanthus frieze and dentil cornice to walls and floor beams.
The Harrow Public House; 51.51294°N 0.10675°W		Early 18th century	Formerly a pair of three-storey terraced houses that have been converted into a public house. Of red brick construction, with a parapet in front of the dormered tiled roof. The 19th-century pub front stretches across both buildings and is coarsely pilastered. The rear elevation to Primrose Hill is of a similar design, with a further pilastered pub front.
1-3, Wine Office Court; 51.51450°N 0.10738°W		Early 19th century	A row of three terraced houses, consisting of three storeys of yellow brick, topped by a pantiled mansard roof. The ground storey entrances are arched with fanlights over the doors, and the rear elevation to Hind Court is plain.
19-21, Watling Street; 51.51297°N 0.09401°W		Mid-19th century	The mid-19th-century building is five storeys tall and of yellow brick and stone. The ground floor shopfronts contain an order of pilasters separating the windows and entrances. The windows at first and second floor level are paired and share arches, with diving columns and carved decorations above. The west return is plain.
Fragment of Rubble Wall in Former Churchyard of St Anne, Blackfriars; 51.51283°N 0.10210°W		Medieval	Section of ruined wall, most probably part of a former Dominican convent. Located in the churchyard of the former parish church of St Ann Blackfriars.
18 and 19, Fleet Street; 51.51363°N 0.11064°W		1898–99	Designed by Sir Arthur Blomfield, the four-storey building is home to a branch of Barclays. It is constructed of Portland stone in the free classical style.
6 Crane Court, Including 18 Red Lion Court; 51.51494°N 0.10911°W		c1670	The listing includes the former 18, Red Lion Court. Of a design by Nicholas Barbon, the building was damaged by fire in 1971. It is similar in design to 5, Crane Court, less an additional storey. The entrance consists of an 18th-century inset doorcase flanked by rusticated pilasters, and topped with a triple key. A full-height early 19th-century additional wing is located to the rear, built from yellow brick. Inside, one original decorated ceiling is extant on the first floor.
121, Cannon Street; 51.51152°N 0.08874°W		c1900	A narrow beige stone terraced building of five storeys, with the ground floor having a later shop front inserted, but retaining its original cornice over. A large semi-circular lunette adorns the fourth storey, under a shaped roof parapet.
The Bell Public House; 51.51100°N 0.08941°W		Mid-19th century	Mid-19th-century public house of four storeys fronted in stucco. A pilastered timber pub front occupies the ground floor, flanked by plaster corbels on top of panelled pilasters. The upper storeys have stucco window surrounds, string courses, and cornice. The top floor has a plaster relief of a bell located in the central bay.
40 Stone Posts to Forecourt of Cathedral Church of St Paul; 51.51373°N 0.10003°W		19th century	A set of forty moulded granite posts that bound the stone paved forecourt of St Paul's Cathedral.
Statue of Queen Victoria at Approach to Blackfriars Bridge; 51.51102°N 0.10440°W		1896	Standing bronze figure of Queen Victoria by Charles Bell Birch, mounted on a pink granite plinth.
3-5, Wardrobe Place; 51.51271°N 0.10098°W		Late 17th to early 18th century	A row of plain, three-storey, red brick terraced houses, topped with a tiled roof pierced by dormers, less no. 5 which had its attic converted to a full storey. Nos. 3 and 4 are united and have a common ground storey which is rendered with square-headed windows. Nos. 4 and 5 have a pair of doorcases with fanlights over, probably of late 18th-century origin. No. 5 has a plaque mounting marking the site as the former King's Wardrobe.
24-26, Watling Street; 51.51297°N 0.09401°W		Mid-19th century	A mid-19th-century commercial building of five storeys, with the ground floor now converted into a public house. The front façade is of cast iron and stone inset with large windows, with broad pilasters supporting entablatures at each floor level, and case iron columns separating the windows. A pair of richly carved doorways are present at either side of the elevation with bracketed cornices above. A series of iron railings protect the low cellar windows, and the interior is galleried, supported by cast iron columns.
2, Suffolk Lane; 51.51095°N 0.08930°W		18th century	The main structure is of 18th-century origin, with a further altered south wing, dating to the late 17th century. The three-storey building has a stuccoed front elevation, with a simple entrance reached by a set of curved steps and railings. The return elevation to Gophir Lane is of yellow brick, heightened and patched in with red brick, with brick quoins to the southeast corner. Only the basement and ground storey at this elevation are rendered, with warehouse doors present below. 18th-century rainwater pipe, and 18th-century interior are included in the listing.
1, Queen Victoria Street; 51.51298°N 0.09009°W		1873	Currently home to the City of London Magistrates' Court, the Italianate style building consists of a triangular-plan building with a rounded corner containing the main entrance at the junction of Queen Victoria Street and Bucklersbury. Of three storeys and a mansard roof, the ground floor is channelled with a series of round-headed windows crowned with keystones of male and female head reliefs. Those windows on the first floor facing Queen Victoria Street are flanked by Ionic columns, topped by alternating segmental and triangular pediments, and have balustraded balconies projecting; those to Bucklersbury are pedimented on consoles. All second storey windows are corniced with eared architraves. A wrought iron balustrade tops the parapet in front a steep slated roof, pierced with dormers.
36, St Andrew's Hill; 51.51263°N 0.10116°W		Late 18th century	The four-storey dwelling is of yellow and pink brick construction, the front elevation inset with a pedimented doorway flanked by Doric columns and crowned with a fanlight. A smaller entrance is located in the far right bay, and railings surround the outside. The top storey is likely a later addition.
The Daily Telegraph Building; 51.51438°N 0.10675°W		1928	Built as the head office for The Daily Telegraph, with the upper floors containing flats. The Portland stone building is set on a granite podium, and has six storeys with the top storey being recessed. The five central bays to the front elevation project slightly forward with a flute frame, and giant columns separating the windows. The balconies, entrance doors and window frames are bronze, alongside Egyptian ornament to the ground floor. Further sculptures in the form of stone reliefs are mounted over doors and some windows, and a large clock is mounted on a bracket at third floor level.
1-4, Queen Street Place / 69, Upper Thames Street; 51.51055°N 0.09341°W		1911	A large office building that was designed by T. E. Collcutt and Stanley Hamp for Liebig's Extract of Meat Company. It is of stone construction resting on a ground floor of granite, and the building folds on an axis with the wings bending backwards slightly. A large central arched entrance is located centrally in the main elevation, topped with a giant niche and a small pediment to the attic. A pair of pavilions adorn either end, slightly advanced than the central portion, each with giant Corinthian pilasters, pavilion roofs and small open pediments at roof level containing sculptures. The third floor has a series of oriels set inside arches and flanked by giant Ionic columns. The right-hand return has a further pedimented entrance set within a concave corner. The building also retains its original metal doors and balustrades.
Main Block of City of London School (Main Front Block Only); 51.51132°N 0.10593°W		1881–82	The building house the City of London School from its construction until 1986. Constructed in a northern renaissance style, the detached Portland stone building consists of two storeys above a basement, with additional dormers out of a hipped slate roof. The ground storey has an order of Ionic columns, with a further Corinthian order to the next floor supporting a set of arches over lunette windows. A pair of corner pavilions support cupolas at either end, and a large central lantern projects from the roof. Inside is a marble staircase and a great hall covering the entire upper level. Irregular buildings to the rear of the main block are of no interest to the listing.
Embankment Wall With Cast Iron Lamp Standards; 51.51086°N 0.10664°W		1864–70	Granite retaining wall and parapet, piers, and stairs. Mounted on the wall are a series of cast iron lamp standards intertwined with fish and globular lanterns.
Remains of Former Whitefriars Convent; 51.51311°N 0.10739°W	—	14th century	Remains of a former medieval vault, likely of 14th-century origin. A small stone chamber with curved stairs are present, likely from the 16th century.
113, Cannon Street; 51.51159°N 0.08921°W		Mid to late 19th century	The ornate, classical building is situated on a corner plot and consists of four main storeys and a copper-roofed mansard. The ground storeys is adorned with an order of engaged Corinthian columns, in between which are a pair of entrances separated by a large window. A small bowed stone balcony projects from the centre of second storey. An elaborate three-light stone dormer is located centrally within the roof, flanked by smaller dormers, and the ridge is iron-crested.
123-127, Cannon Street / 4, Abchurch Yard; 51.51148°N 0.08861°W		1895	A bright red brick and terracotta building of five storeys, and of asymmetrical composition. The ground floor has a pair of large arches sat on elaborate piers, the left one containing the entrance and being semi-circular, whilst the right one being extended with a shopfront inside. The first and second storeys are united by half-octagonal pilaster strips, with the third and fourth floor similar.
79, Carter Lane; 51.51327°N 0.10257°W		Late 17th century	Of late 17th century, the building was later stuccoed in the 19th century, and consists of three storeys. A shopfront occupies the ground floor, with corniced upper windows above, topped with a crowning cornice and parapet.
Youth Hostel; 51.51314°N 0.10062°W		1874	Having originally housed St Paul's Cathedral School, the building now houses a YHA hostel. The building has two main storeys with an additional two dormered storeys in the roof, and is of white brick and terracotta. The long principal elevation faces Carter Lane, is symmetrical below the cornice, and is lined with a series of shallow projecting bays. The building has elements of renaissance design to it, including Venetian and round windows, round leaded doorways and niches, and sgraffito decoration. The main entrance is located at the east end of the façade and is surmounted by a tall lucerne at roof level, with a prominent pilastered surround and a semi-circular pedimented head. The return to Dean's Court is of a plainer design.
1 Cathedral Place; 51.51496°N 0.09773°W		1688	Modern building that is listed due to a pair of 17th-century carved stones set in the flank wall facing Panyer Alley. The upper stone is a relief of a naked boy sitting on pannier; whilst the lower stone is inscribed with the writing When yu have sought The Citty Round Yet still ths is The highst Ground August the 27 1688.
Eastern Tower to Cannon Street Station Pair of Towers at Cannon Street Station; 51.50925°N 0.09090°W		1865–66	A yellow brick tower, forming one of a pair that mark the junction of the Cannon Street station train shed with the railway bridge. The lower stage of the tower is channelled, with the upper containing open arches. The tower is topped by a square, domed roof, with a squat lantern and spire.
Drake House Lonsdale House; 51.51135°N 0.09112°W		1881	Four-storey office building of simplified gothic style, and constructed from red brick and terracotta. Drake House has an additional storey on top, and both are topped with mansard roofs. The ground storey is plain and of polished brown granite and glass windows, with a series of enriched, pointed arched first-floor windows; whilst the windows above have segmental arches. Drake House has been refaced on the north side, where the adjoining building has been destroyed. A vaulted passage acts as the entrance, blocked with wrought iron gates, and crowned with a coat of arms. The rear elevation is of red brick and stone and continues the 17th-century style.
10 Fleet Street; 51.51363°N 0.11126°W		1885	The four-storey office building is of pink brick and terracotta, and has a canted oriel bay window to the far right bay, connecting the first and second storeys. The ground floor is channelled and is pierced by a set of three semi-circular headed window openings, alongside a lower semi-circular entrance. Mullion and transom windows line the upper floors, with triangular pediments crowning those of the first floor, and scroll pediments those of the second. An order of swagged Ionic pilasters support a rich entablature on the third floor. The roof is lined by a balustrade parapet, broken by a large triangular gable containing an inset window, behind which is a slated mansard roof pierced by dormers. A former passage to the right has later been converted into a window. Inside the decorative plasterwork and staircases with wrought iron balustrades are extant.
15 and 16, Fleet Street; 51.51364°N 0.11098°W		Mid-19th century	A very narrow, four-storey, stuccoed building of a single bay in width. The ground floor shopfront has three narrow semi-circular arches, with the right-hand one being a doorway. An elaborate Venetian window adorns the first floor, a pedimented window to the second floor with the sill united with the below keystone, and a three-light, semi-circular window to the top floor. The building is topped with a slated roof and pedimented dormer.
21, Fleet Street; 51.51367°N 0.11057°W		Late 19th century	Stone façade building of four storeys, with the bottom being rusticated. A large Venetian window is flanked by two entrances, and three storeys of pilasters with richly treated entablatures are above.
33, Fleet Street; 51.51386°N 0.11002°W		Late 18th century	Originally built in the late 17th century, the terraced building has been much altered, including the addition of two further floors turning it into a five-storey building topped by a slated mansard. It is of stock brick construction with flat gauged red brick window heads. A shop front is present at the ground floor, with a pair of columned entrances flanking a large window.
St Ann's Vestry Hall; 51.51305°N 0.10219°W		1905	Built to a design by Sir Banister Fletcher from red brick and stone. The single storey, single bay Edwardian baroque façade is framed by giant Ionic half-columns, upon which an open pediment rests. The centrally placed doorway has eared architrave and is topped with a segemental pediment, above which lies a segmental headed window topped with a plain keystone. Two paired windows lay either side of the doorway.
4, College Hill; 51.51670°N 0.09012°W		Early 18th century	Three-storey, terraced former dwelling with a dormered tile mansard roof. Of red brick construction with a stuccoed ground storey, in which a wooden doorcase lies to the left-hand side, topped with a detail carving inside an open pediment. The rear elevation is of a similar nature.
Newsclip House; 51.51288°N 0.10343°W		Mid-19th century	Three storeys of polychromatic brick, with the ground floor shopfront being stuccoed and consisting of a series of grouped piers with gothic capitals separating large windows. The entrance is located on a splayed corner inside an arched recess, topped with a shouldered gable. The upper storeys contain a series of segment-headed paired windows in banded arched recesses.
Statue of John Hiccocks Against Rear Wall of Numbers 30 to 32 Fleet Street; 51.51349°N 0.11017°W		Early 18th century	A reclining figure of John Hiccocks, Master in Chancery, sculptured from white marble. Modern brick base below with an inscribed stone tablet.
9, 10 and 11 King's Bench Walk; 51.51201°N 0.10854°W		1814	A uniform row of three terraced houses laid out over four storeys. They are of yellow brick with Portland stone dressings, with a simple entrance to no. 9, and round-arched doorways under dated keystones to nos. 10 and 11. The area railings, three lamp arches, and three lead rainwater heads are included in the listing.
5, Paper Buildings; 51.51202°N 0.10930°W		1848	Designed by Sydney Smirke, the 5 storey building is of a Tudor style, and built from red brick with blue brick diapering, and stone dressings. A pair of full-height canted bay windows adorn the south elevation, alongside a pair of polygonal corner towers.
146, Fleet Street; 51.51437°N 0.10730°W		Late 17th century	Of three storeys with a front façade of painted brick, a shopfront and passageway occupies the ground floor. The rear is of red brick with segmental arched windows.
Gates and Railings to Church of St Dunstan in the West; 51.51408°N 0.11012°W		19th century	A set of gates and railings to the forecourt of St Dunstan-in-the-West, incorporating a lamp arch and stone drinking fountain.
32 and 33, Furnival Street; 51.51735°N 0.11029°W		Late 17th to early 18th century	Originally both of three storeys, no. 32 now has an additional floor, whilst no. 33 has a mansard roof. Both terraced buildings are of red brick, with no. 33 having a stuccoed and channelled ground floor. 18th-century area railings, and interior pannelling are included in the listing.
1-3, Ludgate Square; 51.51359°N 0.10175°W		1877	The red brick former warehouse has some white brick and stone dressings amongst the five storeys. Large plate glass windows occupy the ground floor level, framed by exposed fabricated steel lintols supported on brick piers. All of the upper storey windows are contained within a single giant pointed arched recess in each bay, with the windows of each floor being separated by an exposed steel or iron beam, and timber infilling also separates the windows. An iron jib crane is mounted high up between bays.
The Olde Wine Shades; 51.51048°N 0.08805°W		Late 17th century	Public house of late 17th-century origin, of three storeys, with a simple pilastered pub front to the ground floor. The upper storeys are plain and fronted in stucco, and the tiled roof is dormered. Inside, the upper floors contain original joinery, alongside a staircase and marble chimney-piece of 18th-century origin. The rear elevation is original yet plain, however a large extension is also present.
Pair of Piers and Iron Gates and Screen at Entrance to Church of St Mary Woolnoth; 51.51284°N 0.08827°W		18th century	Portland stone piers of 20th-century origin topped with urns, paired with 18th-century wrought iron gates and screen, with an elaborate overthrow.
Pountney Hill House; 51.51076°N 0.08853°W		Late 19th century	The front elevation consists of three shallow canted bays constructed from red brick and stone. Three main storeys sit over the basement, with an additional attic storey above. Full-height narrow pilasters divide the bays, with those to the ground floor of stone inlaid with arabesque and surmounted with winged angels with corncopiae, trumpet, and a laurel wreath. A wrought iron railing lines the parapet inf ront of a steep slated roof.
Blackfriars House; 51.51225°N 0.10466°W		1913–16	Built to a design by Francis William Troup, the large steel-framed commercial building is laid out over seven storeys. The ground storey is plain with iron railings and tone standards to the area. The first through fourth stories are lined with paired windows separated by attenuated panelled pilaster strips. The centre section of the first storey has bracketed iron-railed balconies, with lamp standards above.
The Sugar Loaf Public House; 51.51231°N 0.09293°W		Early 19th century	Three-storey public house situated on a corner plot at the junction of Cannon Street and Queen Street. Constructed from Flemish bonded brick, with a header bond to the rebated and curved corner range, and stucco to the ground floor and dressings. The main entrance is located in the corner range, with a further two entrances to Cannon Street. The pub front has a series of rusticated pilasters at the ground floor.
Number 26 (Formerly Known As Numbers 26 and 27), Farringdon Street; 51.51585°N 0.10443°W		1886	Former printing machinery works, now converted into four-storey office block. Of red brick construction with terracotta dressings, the four-storey building has an asymmetrical composition in a Flemish renaissance style. A narrow entrance to the right-hand side of the main elevation sits below a projecting turreted bay. Elsewhere, a central bay of paired windows are flanked by a pair of bays containing tripartite windows, with those on the ground floor being within segmental headed arches.
Former Glasgow Herald Office; 51.51401°N 0.10840°W		1927	Originally constructed as the London office of the Glasgow Herald newspaper. Six storeys tall of stone and polished granite, with gilded bronze accents. The ground floor of the narrow building is of polished granite with a gilded bronze frieze of a frozen fountain motif over the entrance. An inset segmental bay spans from the first to the third floors, above which is a fretted hood adorned with carved lion masks. Three windows sit at the next floor, divided by full-height risers. A two-storey roof projection tops the building, with three slotted window openings defined by Egyptian-style pediments.
Caretaker's Lodge; 51.51493°N 0.10820°W		1910–12	A former caretaker's lodge designed by Alfred Burr to serve as the home of the curator of Dr Johnson's House, and of brown brick with red brick dressings in an early 18th-century style. A steep slate roof caps the two-storey building. To the north elevation, a pair of entrances adorn the ground floor, with a pair of windows above that break through the eaves and terminate in a segmental pediment. To the east elevation, a pair of oeil-de-bouef windows are at ground floor level, whilst to at the first floor, single windows above also break through the eaves with a segmental pediment above. On the south elevation, a further set of paired windows break through the roofline.
22, Queen Street; 51.51234°N 0.09288°W		Late 19th century	Office block and former shopfront, with the neighbouring Sugarloaf public house extended into the premises. The narrow four-storey building is of Flemish bond brick, stone dressings, and a hipped roof of slate. The ground floor shopfront is defined with pilasters at the party walls. A chimney stack rises from the roof at the left party wall.
2-7, Salisbury Court; 51.51385°N 0.10641°W		1878	A row of commercial chambers of brick in English bond, with rubbed brick and terracotta dressings, wooden bays to the ground floor, and a hipped roof of slate. The three-storey block is articulated into three major and two minor bays by giant brick piers which become fluted pilasters at second floor level, and a pair of round-arched entrances are present in the second and fifth window ranges. The wood insets at ground floor level are renewed, yet faithful to the original. Terracotta plaques below the first-floor windows include carvings of sunflowers, scrolls and a busts. Three two-storey window bays are present, one is rectangular in two stages, and the other two are shallow canted, all three of these bays terminate in a Dutch gable dormer. On the roof, the second row of gable dormers has been rebuilt, and chimney stacks are present at the interior fire walls and party walls. Blue plaque mounted to the building marking the site where The Sunday Times was first edited.
Former Argus Printing Company; 51.51233°N 0.10767°W		1896–97	The four-storey corner building was built as the head office for the Argus Printing Company, and is of Portland stone and brick, with Ruabon terracotta dressings. The ground floor has a rusticated stone frontage with both round and elliptical-arched openings for windows and doors, whereas those window openings on the first floor are basket-arched. All second- and third-floor windows are flat-arched with mullions and transoms, over which a balustraded parapet lines the roof. At street level, a carving of a shield bourne by a winged Argus is mounted at the corner. The final bay on Temple street has vehicle delivery entrances to the ground floor.
30, 31 and 32 Fleet Street; 51.51373°N 0.11014°W		1883	Stone chambers of late 19th-century origin, with four storeys topped with a dormered attic inside a hipped roof. The ground floor has been largely altered to contain a pair of shopfronts, with traces of the original features present at the left-hand entrance, and right party wall. The first through third floor tripartite windows are set in shallow segmental bays with transoms, and articulated by panelled pilasters topped with balusters and an entablature. A superposed order of pilasters separate each bay, and a Dutch gable dormer rises from each bay.
6, Bolt Court; 51.51474°N 0.10796°W		1912	Formerly serving as the School of Illustrated Printing and now in use as an adult education centre, the building was designed by William Riley. Built from dark red brick laid in English bond, with stucco dressings and a tiled roof, the building is laid out in an 'L' plan over four storeys and an attic. An entrance is located centrally to the ground floor above a set of stone steps that bridge the void leading to the basement below, and consists of a set of twin leaf hardwood doors with a fanlight above, surrounded by moulded architraves and surmounted by a carved and moulded shell door hood. The building is adorned with small-paned metal casement windows set in mullion and transom hardwood frames, and topped with rubbed brick arches and stucco keystones. An iron railing with scrollwork mounted on a Portland stone curb surrounds the basement area at the front of the building. Inside, the ground floor lobby and entrance hall have shallow quadripartite plaster vaulted ceilings and segmental arches. Wood panelling to the walls is extant, alongside half-glazed doors, a glazed screen with sash windows to the enquiry office, brown and buff chequered-pattern ceramic floor tiles. The stairs to the basement remain, as well as the main stairs to the upper floors. The classrooms have wood block floors, tiled dados, and cased-beamed ceilings. Pannelled doors, wooden fireplace surrounds, and Dutch-tiled surrounds to cast iron gates all remain in the top floor former caretaker's residence.
Temple of Mithras; 51.51268°N 0.09166°W		c240-250	Ruins of a roman temple dedicated to the god Mithraism. Consists of rubble stone walling of Kentish Ragstone with tile banking, alongside ashlar quoins, column bases, door sill and jambs. The foundations and first few courses above the ground have been reconstructed utilising modern mortar, after the ruins were dismantled and moved, before being returned to the original site.
K6 Telephone Kiosks at St Paul's Cathedral; 51.51354°N 0.10030°W		c1935	A set of three K6 type public telephone kiosks as designed by Sir Giles Gilbert Scott. They consist of a square kiosk of cast iron painted in red, topped with a domed roof, and with unperforated crowns adorning the top panel on each face. Two are located together on the southwest side of St Paul's Churchyard, while the other is set next to the tower of St Augustine Watling Street.
Magnesia House; 51.51286°N 0.10275°W		Late 18th century	Late 18th-century house, which is potentially a remodelling of a house of 1733 origin and small building of 1780 origin that occupied the same site, and was altered and extended in both the mid- and late 20th century. The southern portion consists of a house over three storeys and attic, facing east into Playhouse Yard. The northern element, known as the Counting House, was originally a single storey but later raised to four, and links to the main house through a connecting doorway to the ground floor; yet on the upper floors the buildings are conjoined with no separating walls. The house is of Flemish bonded brown brick, with the additional third storey in red brick. The main entrance is set into the right-hand bay, consisting of a pedimented doorcase with scrolled brackets and panelled reveals. The elevation to Playhouse Yard is curved and enclosed at ground level into a former yard that is now roofed over. The rear elevation has been partially obscured by the additional stories added to the Counting House, however the lower levels of brickwork appear to be 18th-century in nature, with the ground-floor window openings being reformed. A double-faced brass clock is mounted on the north wall. Inside, the building has been much altered and retains no visible original features. The Counting House, however, retains full-height late 18th-century wooden panelling incorporating shelving, alongside a vaulted basement accessed via a set of stairs.
Goldsmith Building; 51.51347°N 0.11059°W		1861	A set of legal chambers built to the design of James Piers St Aubyn in the late 19th century, with the addition of an attic in the early 20th century. The plan of the building has undergone little alteration, less the enclosure of a set of stairs to the rear, and is laid out with a main stairwell leading to a series of legal chambers in the south, west, and east sides. The ground floor and basement are faced in rusticated Portland stone, whilst the upper floors are of red brick with Portland stone quoins, architraves, and strings between storeys. Segmental-headed windows are present at the basement, ground, and second floor levels, whereas the first floor has square-headed windows with moulded cornices. A balustraded bridge leads across the basement area leading to the main entrance on the principal elevation; the entrance itself is pedimented, flanked by a pair of Tuscan columns, and topped by a semi-circular carved tympanum. Above the entrance, at first floor level, lies a tall semi-circular headed window, flanked by pilasters and a rusticated surround. To the left-hand side, the southwest corner bay has a curved oriel starting at the first floor, and is faced entirely in Portland stone, beneath which lies a stone-carved coat of arms. The three visible elevations are topped with a hipped clay tile roof, and a flat roof lies behind. The basement area is enclosed by a set of cast-iron railings set on a low stone plinth, with a set of stone steps leading down at the northwest side. The railings are interrupted by a pair of stone piers flanking the entrance, and carrying ornate cast-iron lamp-posts. Inside, the stone staircase is accented by cast-iron column balusters and a mahogany handrail. Original fittings include panelled doors and shutters, marble fire surrounds, and cast-iron grates.
30 Cannon Street (formerly Crédit Lyonnais); 51.51238°N 0.09486°W		1974–77	Built for the banking firm Crédit Lyonnais, and was the first building in the world to be fully clad in double-skinned glass-fibre reinforced cement (GRC) panels. Occupying a triangular site at the junction of Cannon Street and Queen Victoria Street, with the base of the triangle facing Bread Street, the building consists of six storeys sat atop a raised basement. Three entrances (one facing onto each bordering road) led into a main circular banking hall; however, that to Bread Street has since been infilled and the banking hall removed. The ground storey is taller than those above, and consists of larger pre-set panels with wider windows, with each terminating in a flattened four-centre arch. To Bread Street, each storey is set back further than the one below. The interior has been much altered, with all upper offices being of 21st-century replacements. The internal face of the exterior walls are clad in GRC panels similar to those outside. The stairs and lifts remain; however, they have been largely altered and refurbished. The building has a set of perimeter railings to the Cannon Street and Queen Victoria Street elevations, which are included in the listing.
St Lawrence Jewry Drinking Fountain; 51.51293°N 0.09734°W		1866	Originally located outside the parish church of St Lawrence Jewry, the fountain was removed in 1970 and reinstated to the south of St Paul's Cathedral in 2010. Constructed from Portland stone with polished pink granite columns, and a bronze relief sculpture by Joseph Durham. A substantial base carries a canopy of four hooded niches around a central pocketed spire. The north-facing niche contains a carving of Saint Lawrence, whilst in the south is one of Mary Magdalene. The east and west niches are empty, however it is believed they originally held a pair of white marble slabs holding the names of past benefactors of the churches. The fountain is mounted on the north face, consisting of a niche with a carved hood resting on granite columns. A bronze bas-relief of Moses is set into the niche, a shallow stone bowl projects from the fountain supported by a broad granite column sat on a stone base. A modern brass tap has been added to the south face of the monument, and a bronze plaque has been mounted to the east describing the history of the monument.
St Thomas à Becket sculpture 51.51350°N 0.09771°W		1970–71	Fibreglass resin statue, by Edward Bainbridge Copnall, and depicting Thomas Becket. The statue has a bronze finish, and it is mounted on a stepped stone base, with a plaque at the foot of which.
Four lamp posts outside the western entrance to St Pauls Cathedral; 51.51374°N 0.09996°W		1874	A line of identical cast iron lamp posts by Francis Penrose. Originally functioning through gas, they were later converted to have an electrical supply in the 20th century. They have circular bases, rising from which is a moulded square-section pillar with decorative brackets, terminating with four projecting cherubs. Continuing up, a four-sided column with panelled fluting continues to the base of the lamp itself, which is adorned with further cast-iron decoration. The octagonal glass lantern is supported by four brackets and also framed in cast-iron, before being topped by a saucer-shaped dome surmounted by a ball and finial.
