= Temple Chambers, London =

Offices in London, England

Coordinates: 51.512140°N 0.108311°W

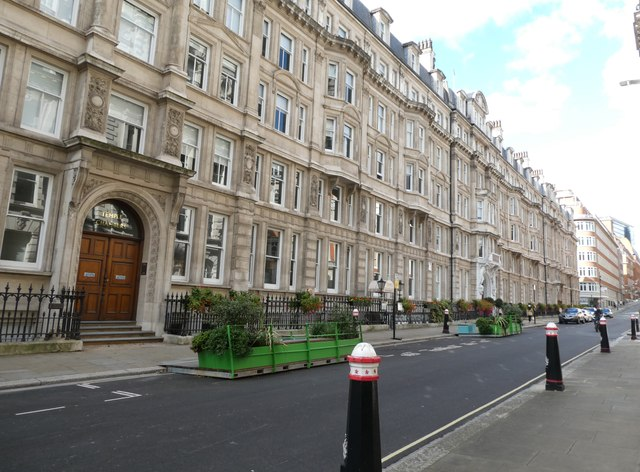
Temple Chambers

Temple Chambers is a row of offices that spans the western side of Temple Avenue in the City of London.

== History ==
The offices were built as a set of purpose built legal chambers in 1887, completed posthumously to the design of John Whichcord. The buildings have since been transferred to use as general purpose offices.

== Design ==
The offices occupy a long narrow plot, running between a number of buildings of King's Bench Walk on the west, Hamilton House adjacent to the south, and Temple Avenue to the east with Telephone House and Temple House beyond. The buildings have elements of both Jacobean and Classical. The frontage consists of a 107m long row of repeating units, balconies and bays punctuating the facade. The central entrance features a large oriel, surmounted by two Atlantes of an unknown artist.
