= Pountney =

Pountney is a surname. Notable people with the surname include:

- Budge Pountney (born 1973), British rugby union player and coach
- Charmaine Pountney, New Zealand educator
- Christine Pountney (born 1971), Canadian author
- Dave Pountney (born 1939), English footballer
- David Pountney (born 1947), British-Polish theatre and opera director
- Graham Pountney (born 1953), British actor
- Culture Shock (musician), born James Pountney, British DJ and record producer

== See also ==
- Samuel Pountney Smith (1812–1883), English architect
- Pountney Hill House, a building in London, UK
- St Laurence Pountney, a former church in London
