= Hoop and Grapes =

Hoop and Grapes is a pub name. Notable pubs with this name include:

- Hoop and Grapes, Aldgate High Street, London
- Hoop and Grapes, Farringdon Street, London
