= 85 Fleet Street =

Commercial building in London, England

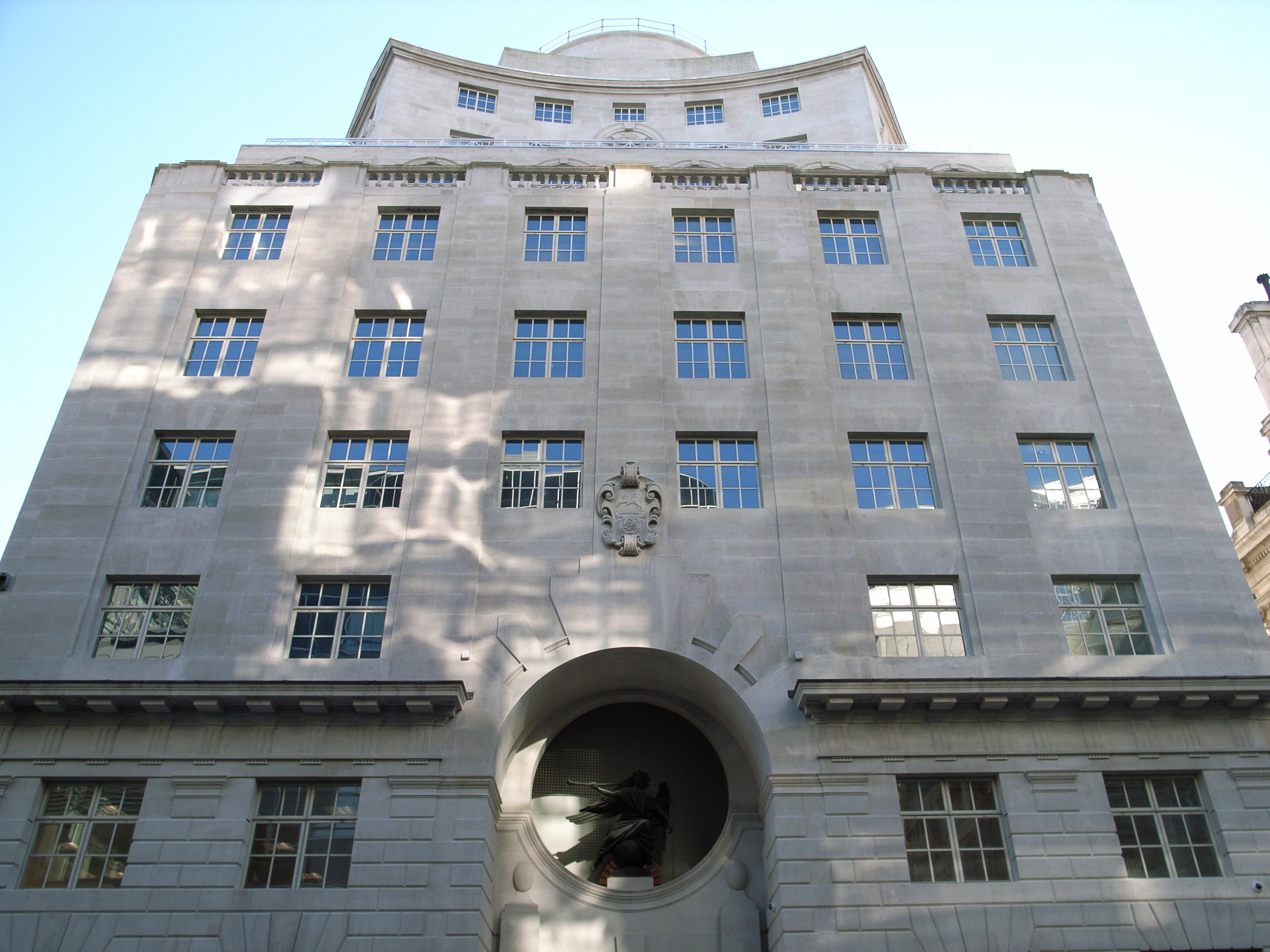
- The main frontage in February 2007

- Shown in London
- 51.5140°N 0.1060°W
- Location: Fleet Street, London

History
- Built: 1935

Site notes
- Architect: Edwin Lutyens
- Architectural style: Neoclassical style

Listed Building – Grade II
- Official name: 82–85, Fleet Street, 9 Salisbury Court
- Designated: 5 June 1972
- Reference no.: 1064656

85 Fleet Street is a prominent building in Fleet Street, London. The building, which was commissioned by the Reuters news agency, is a Grade II listed building.

== History ==
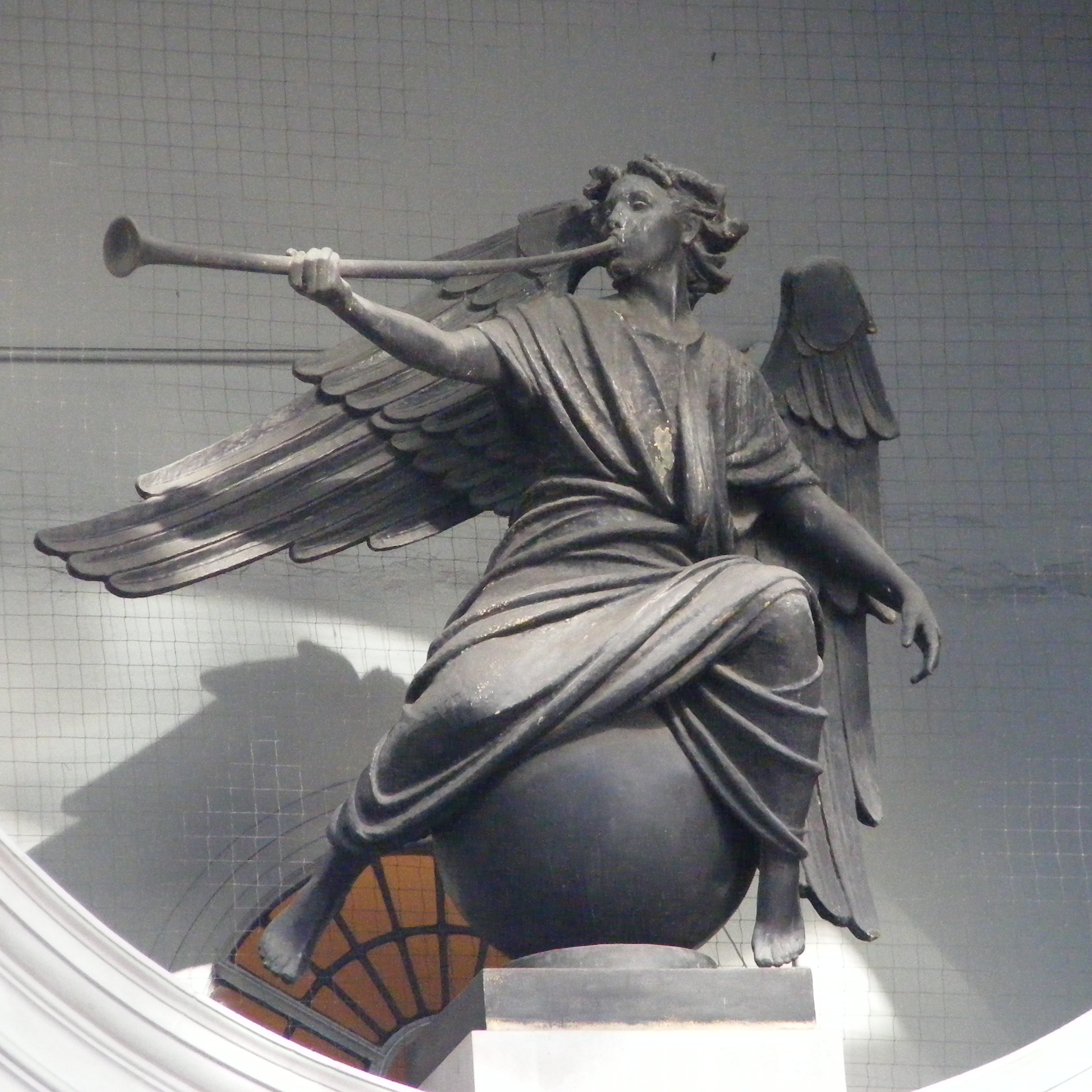
The Herald by William Reid Dick

The building was commissioned by the Reuters news agency in the early 1930s. The site it selected, on the south side of Fleet Street, had previously accommodated a building used by Punch magazine. The new building was designed by Edwin Lutyens in the neoclassical style, built in ashlar stone and was completed in 1935.

The design involved a symmetrical main frontage of six bays facing onto the street. The lower two bays were rusticated. The central bay featured a round headed opening, three bays high, which accommodated a doorway and a fine bronze statue by William Reid Dick known as "The Herald". The statue was unveiled by Lutyens on 10 July 1939. The upper floors (from the second to the fifth floor) were fenestrated by a series of square-shaped casement windows. Above the main structure, there were three more floors (from the sixth to the eighth floor) which were recessed with a concave façade and surmounted by a drum.

In the 1970s, there was a branch of National Westminster Bank on the ground floor.

The building accommodated the Press Association until it moved out to Vauxhall Bridge Road in 1995. It also accommodated Reuters until it moved to 30 South Colonnade in Canary Wharf in 2005. Reuters was the last major news outlet to leave Fleet Street at that time. The building was subsequently occupied by a firm of solicitors, Powell Gilbert.

== See also ==
- Grade II listed buildings in the City of London (EC4)
