= 30 South Colonnade =

Commercial building in London

YY London
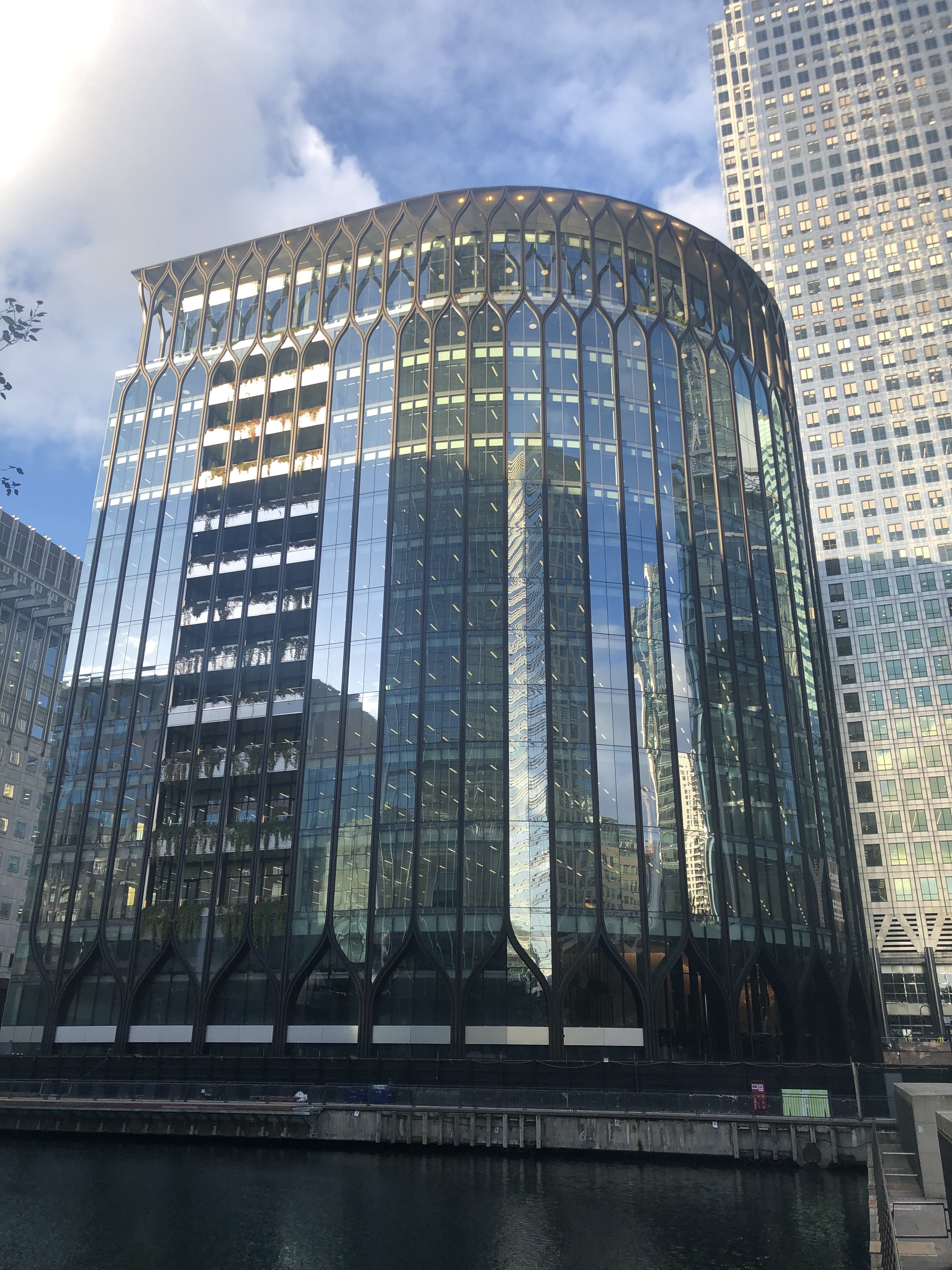
- The building after refurbishment.
- Interactive map of the YY London area
- Former names: Thomson Reuters Building
- Alternative names: 30 South Colonnade

General information
- Status: Completed
- Type: Office
- Location: Canary Wharf; London, E14; England; 51°30′15″N 0°1′13″W
- Completed: 1991

Height
- Height: 62m

Technical details
- Floor count: 14
- Floor area: 414,812 sq ft (39,000 m^{2})

30 South Colonnade, also now known as YY London, is a commercial building in Canary Wharf, London. The building was originally designed by Kohn Pedersen Fox and completed in 1991. It was purchased in 2019 by joint venture between Oaktree Capital Management (majority stakeholder) and Quadrant. An extensive refurbishment was completed in 2023 by architects Buckley Gray Yeoman, which included three additional floors bringing its total size to 415,000 sqft. The refurbished building stands at 75.5 m (248 ft) tall, with a total of 17 floors – a ground floor, upper ground floor, mezzanine level and 14 upper floors including a rooftop terrace. The building design focuses on sustainability and wellness with extensive on floor terraces, BREEAM Outstanding and WELL Platinum ESG certificates and an all-electric strategy. It has been designed to be net zero in operation.

YY London primarily provides office space, although following the building’s refurbishment there are also restaurants, communal spaces for events, and food and beverage units at ground floor level.

== Owners ==
In 2019, the building was purchased by a joint venture between Oaktree Capital Management (majority stakeholder) and Quadrant Estates. The building had previously been sold by Canary Wharf Group for £200m to German fund manager KanAm Grund in December 2005.

== History and tenants ==
It was one of the first buildings to be built on the Canary Wharf estate and known as a landmark Canary Wharf building because of its distinctive curved frontage and location opposite the Jubilee Line Underground station.

Prior to 2005, the building was occupied by London Underground.

Reuters moved from 85 Fleet Street into the building in 2005. As part of Reuters' relocation, Perkins + Will carried out extensive refurbishment of the building, including installing a 100 metre long ticker around the building to display news and stock prices that became a well known feature at Canary Wharf.

In 2019 Quadrant Estates and funds managed by Oaktree Capital Management secured planning permission for the redesign of the building. At the time, Tower Hamlets council, the local authority for Canary Wharf said the proposed development would ‘improve the existing office space’ and ‘result in a more environmentally appropriate building’.

In May 2025, Revolut committed to a 10 year lease, moving their Global HQ in to four floors of the building, covering an area of 113,000 square feet (10,500 m^{2}). This lease also saw the implementation of two large Revolut signs on the top of the building.

== Design and refurbishment ==
Building name

The name YY London was given to the building because of the Y-shaped cladding used on the building’s façade in the most recent refurbishment.

Energy efficiency and wellness

Today’s refurbished building design focuses on sustainability and wellness with extensive on floor terraces, BREEAM Outstanding and WELL Platinum ESG certificates and an all-electric strategy.

In refurbishment the aim was to reduce overall energy demand of the building by 62% by improving energy efficiency, with new external glazing improving the thermal performance of the building and contributing to this significantly.

Retention of existing building

Much of the building’s existing structure, fabrics and piled foundations were reused in the most recent refurbishment to avoid demolition. This is estimated to have saved 10,620 tonnes of C02e. The original building was essentially built on stilts and sits over water. Two storeys from the former 62m tall building were removed above the 11th floor slab, while keeping the existing floor slab intact.

All electric

The refurbished building is powered electrically with building services including photovoltaic panels on the roof, and an air source heat pump providing free heating and redirecting waste heat to other parts of the building.

New Façade

As part of the refurbishment, the building’s façade was replaced with a glazed façade to meet modern requirements. In developing a new façade, the positioning of existing structural grids limited options. To overcome this, each corner was treated individually to work around the existing column grid. This enabled the creation of a façade that looks like a new building, but was the reworking of an existing one.

Atrium & terraces

During the recent refurbishment a triple height reception was introduced. The building’s core was shifted and the existing multistorey central atrium was filled to make space to deepen the floor plate and produce additional net internal area. This provided the option to introduce more natural light into the building, and also allowed outdoor terraces on every floor to be introduced.

Recyclable materials

Products and materials have been specified that can be recycled at the end of their lives.

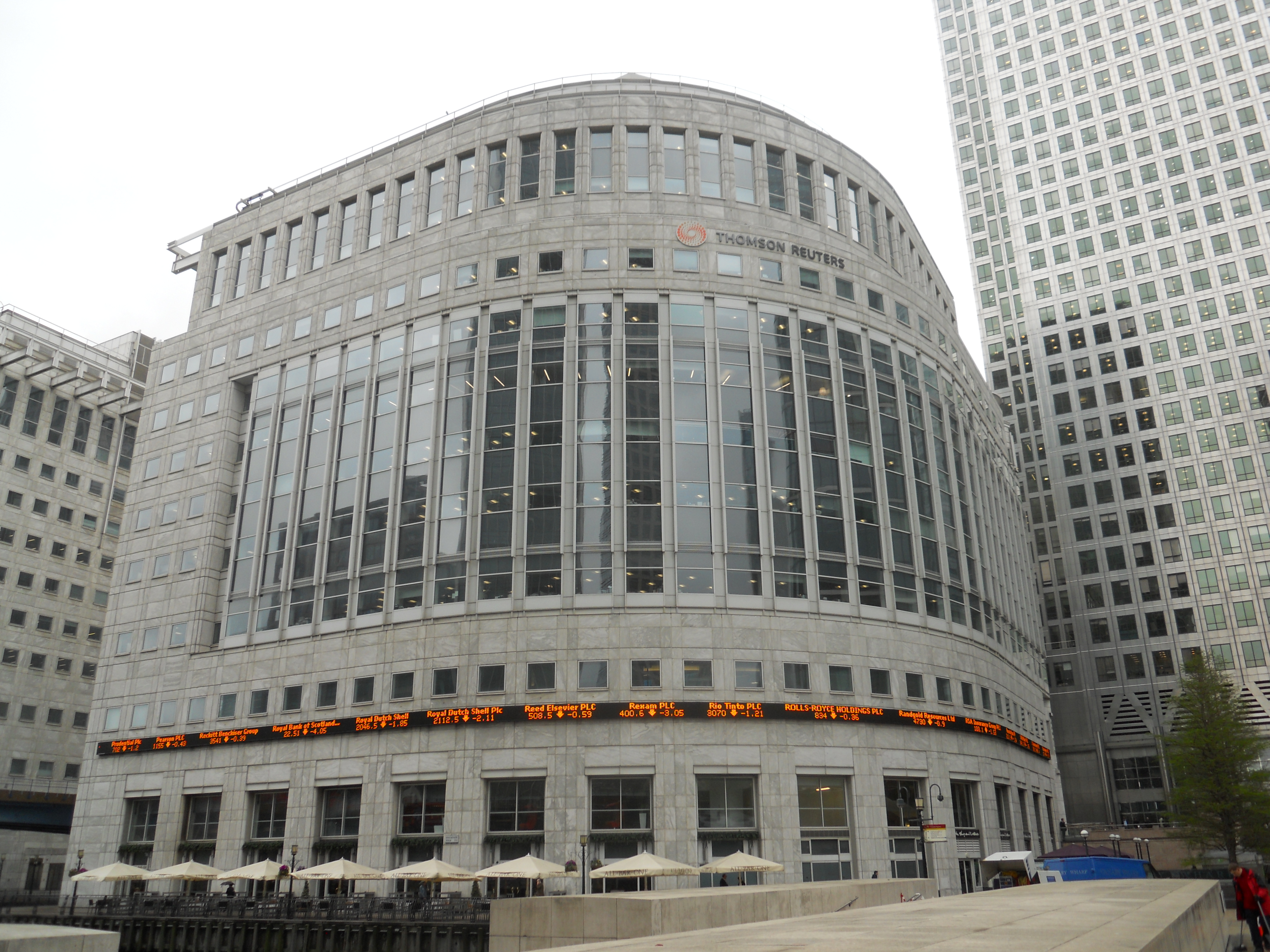
30 South Colonnade in 2012 before the refurbishment.

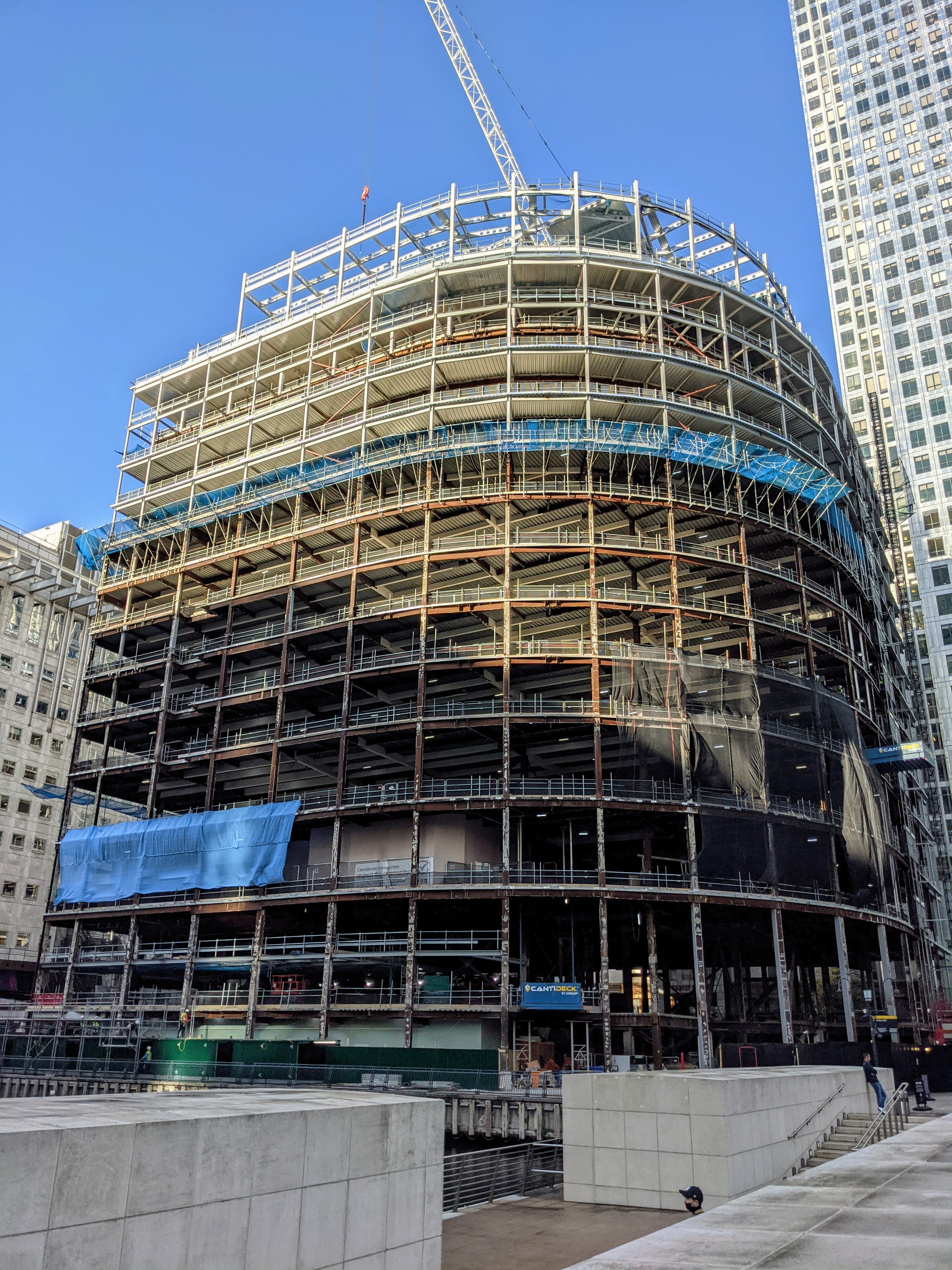
The building under refurbishment in October 2021.
