= Knightrider Street =

Street in the City of London

Coordinates: 51.512513°N 0.099548°W

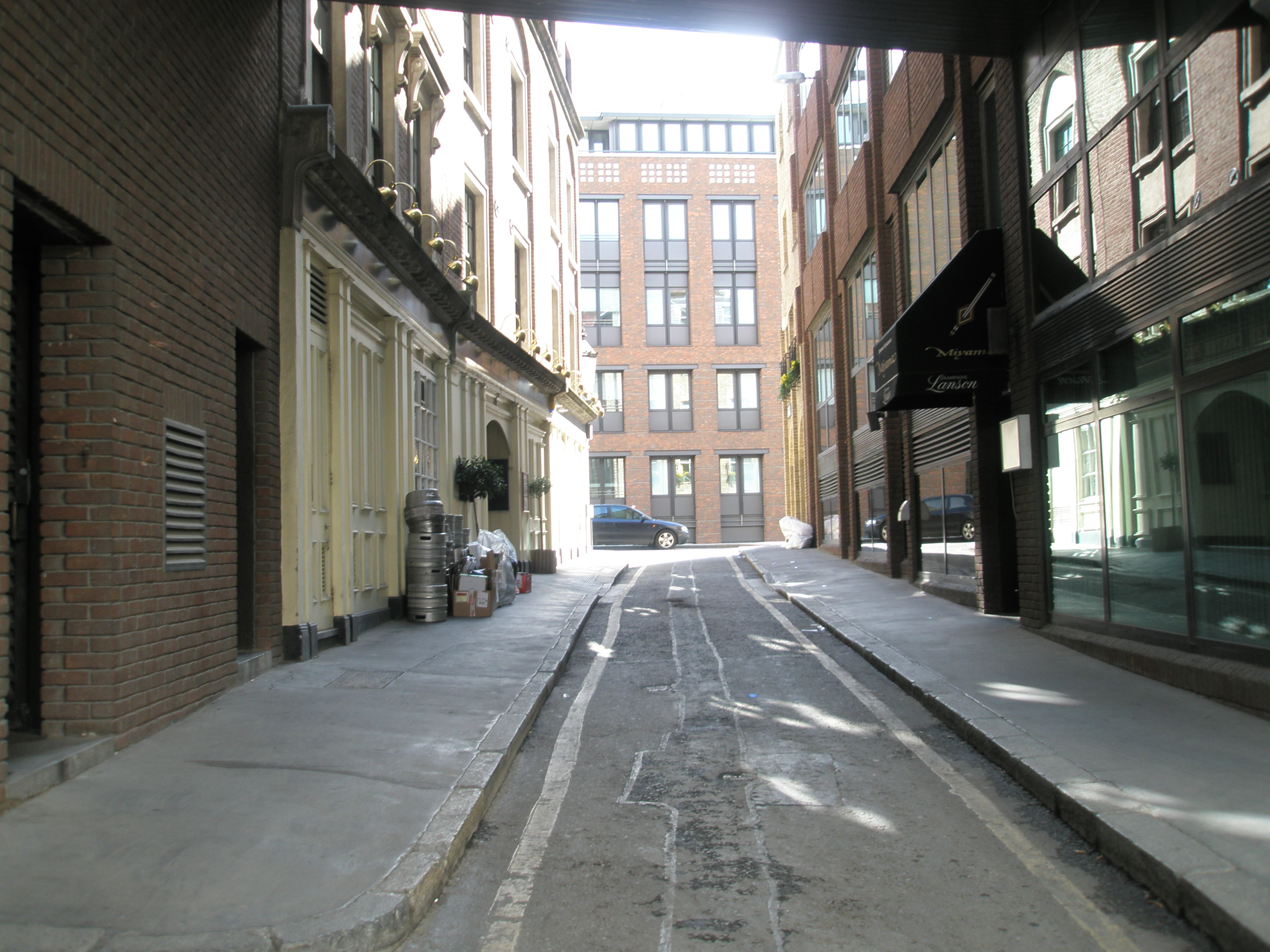
View east along the eastern end of Knightrider Street

Knightrider Street is a street in the City of London, located a short distance to the south of St Paul's Cathedral. It was originally the site of the German Church built in 1666–5 and demolished in 1867 to make way for Queen Victoria Street and the District line of the London Underground; the Doctors' Commons, also demolished in 1867 for the same reason; and the church of St Mary Magdelen, demolished in 1866 after being badly damaged in a fire. At No. 5, the physician Thomas Linacre founded the Royal College of Physicians.

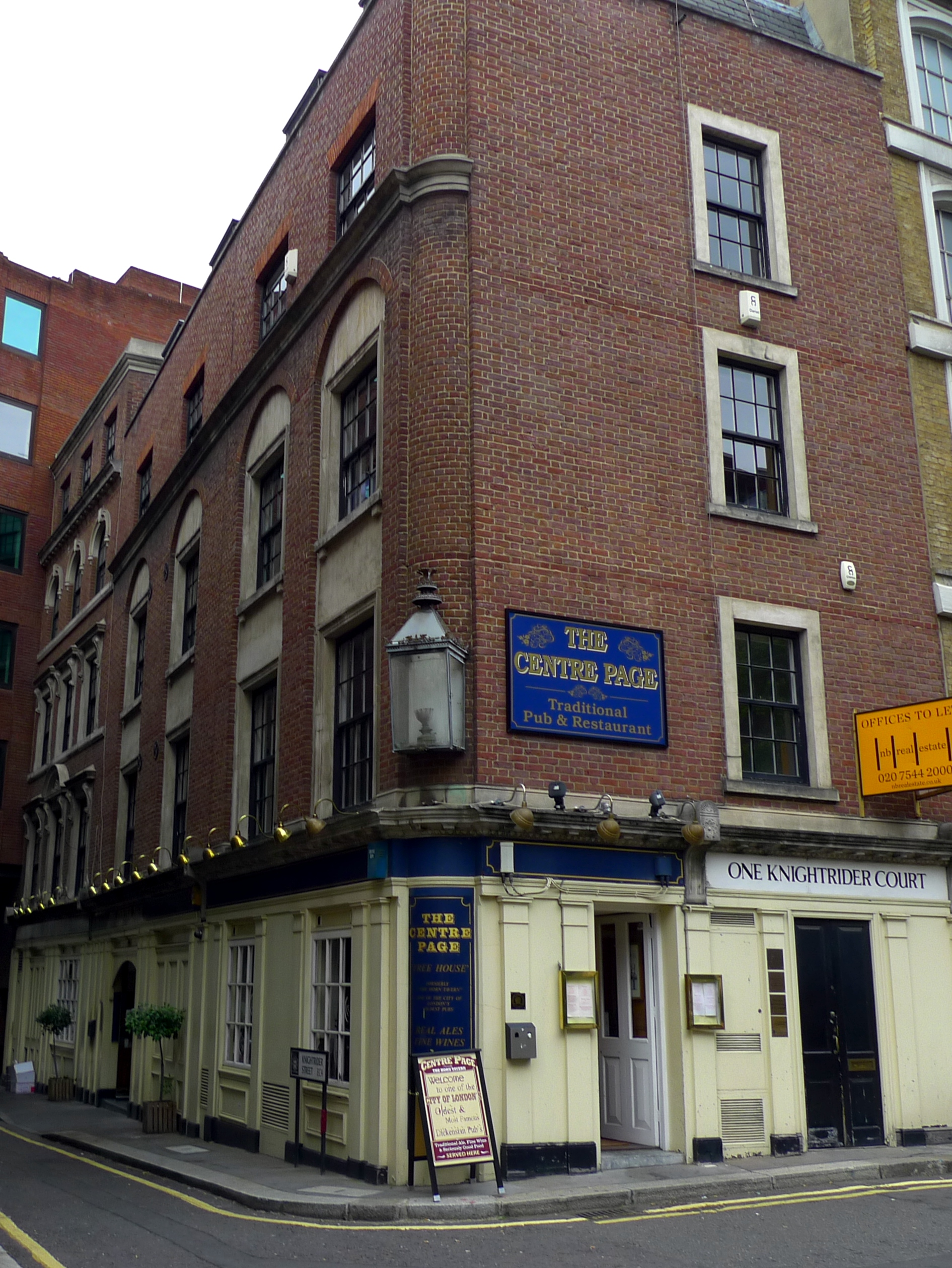
The Centre Page pub

Much of the street was demolished when Queen Victoria Street was built in the 1860s. Until 1872, it consisted of three distinct streets: Old Fish Street in the eastern portion, Little Knightrider Street in the middle portion and Great Knightrider Street in the western portion. The Centre Page pub on the street dates back to the 1660s, when it was known as the Horn. David Hasselhoff, the star of the cult 1980s TV series Knight Rider, has said that it is his favourite pub.

== Name ==
Its name is first recorded in 1322 in the form of Knyghtridestrete; other forms include Knyghtriderestrete, Knyghtryderestrete, Knyghtrederistret and Knightriders streete. The 16th-century historian and antiquarian John Stow suggested in his 1598 Survey of London that the street was named after "Knights well armed and mounted at the Tower Royal, riding from thence through that street west to Creed Lane, and so out at Ludgate towards Smithfield, where they were there to tourney, joust, or otherwise to show activities before the King and States of the realm." His proposed etymology is questioned by Eilert Ekwall, who points out that "a word knightrider is unrecorded and if it existed it ought to have meant either a horseman serving a knight or a knightly horseman." He suggests that the original name was "Riderestret, to which knight was prefixed". In early Middle English the term "rider" was synonymous with "knight", so people may have thought that "Rider Street" meant "Knight's Street" and prefixed it with knight to make that meaning clearer.

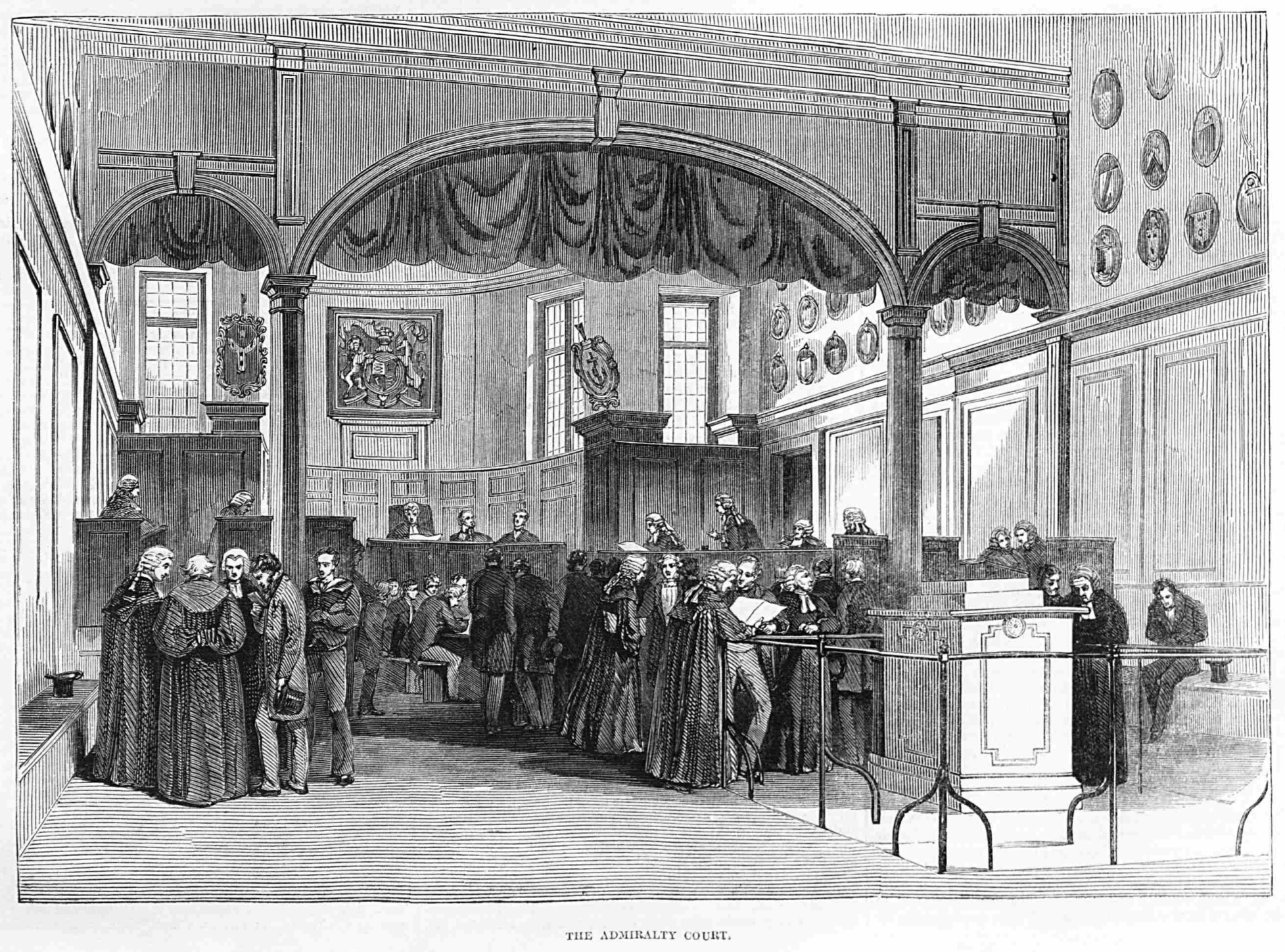
The Admiralty Court, Great Knight Rider Street, Doctors' Commons. Pen and Pencil (newspaper), 1855.
