= Carmelite House =

Building in London, England

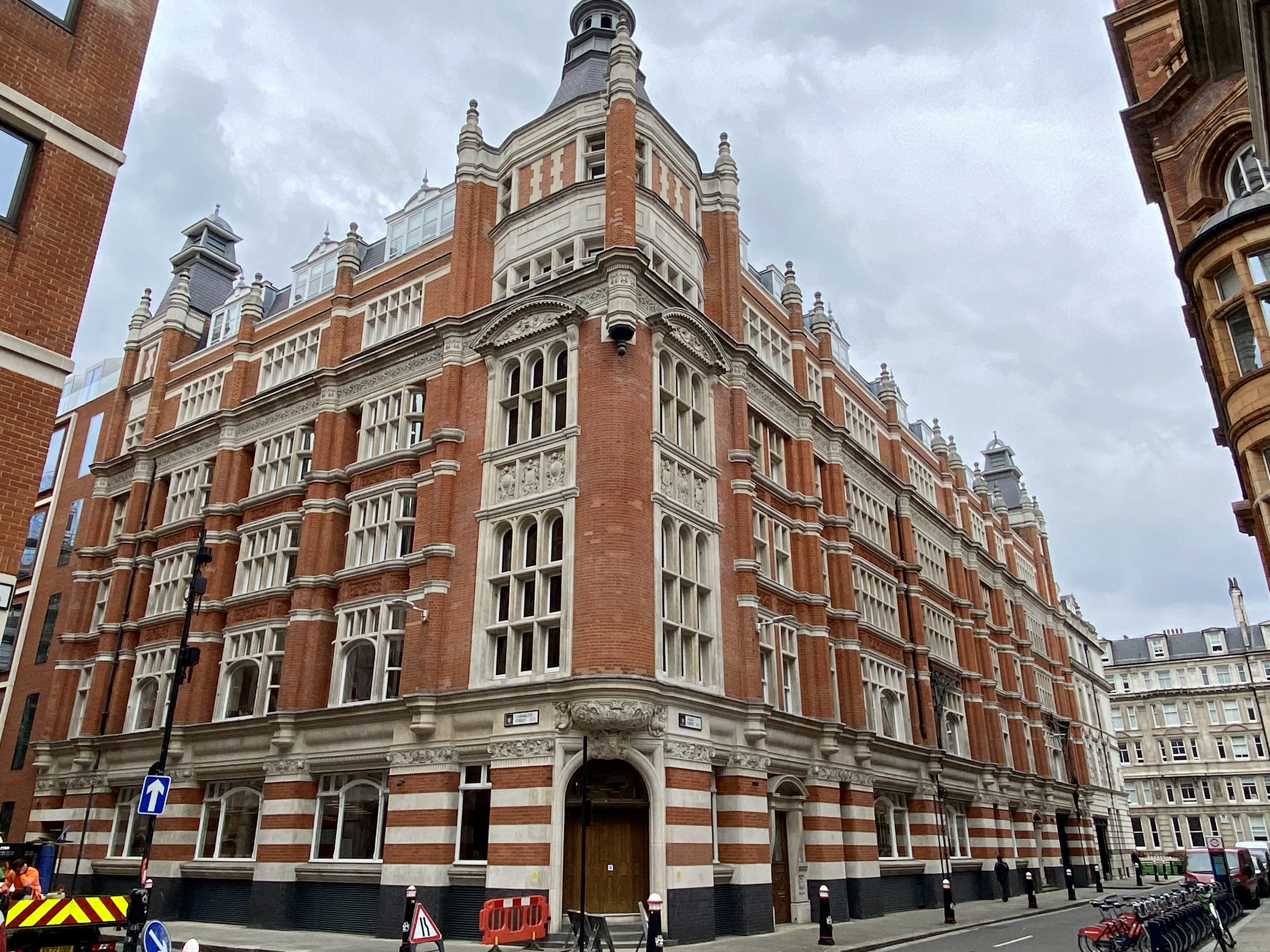
- Carmelite House

General information
- Type: Office
- Architectural style: Neo-Tudor
- Location: London, England
- Coordinates: 51°30′42″N 0°06′26″W
- Completed: 1899

Design and construction
- Architect: Herbert Owen Ellis

Listed Building – Grade II
- Official name: Carmelite House
- Designated: 10 November 1977
- Reference no.: 1064727

Carmelite House is a Grade II listed office building near Fleet Street in London. It was built as a printing-house, and hosted a number of publishers and newspapers.

== History ==
The building was constructed between 1897 and 1899. It was one of many print offices built in the area, nearby to Fleet Street, the centre of the London print trade, following encouragement from the City of London Corporation for the sake of street improvements. Other examples are the nearby Temple House and Former Argus Printing Company Building. The building was devised as a combined offices and newspaper factory, the oldest survivor of its kind in the area. It was designed by Herbert Owen Ellis for Lord Northcliffe's Associated Newspapers.

The building hosted the offices of the Daily Mail and The Mail, managed by the Associated Newspapers until they moved to their current headquarters in Kensington.

== Design ==
The building is of red-brick with stone detailing, built in a Neo-Tudor style. Its design is complementary of Telephone House which it adjoins. A notable feature is the large corner tower surmounted by a steep octagonal slate roof and ogee lantern above. A 1936 extension has since been demolished.
