= The Bell, City of London =

Pub in the City of London

Coordinates: 51.511007°N 0.0894151°W

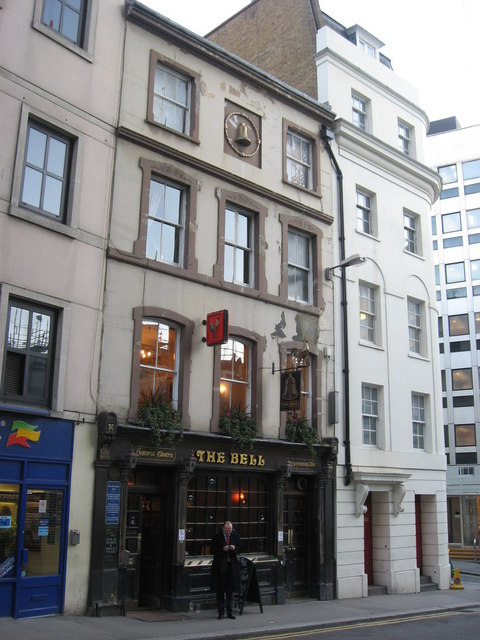
The Bell, Bush Lane, 2008

The Bell is a public house at 29 Bush Lane in the City, London, EC4.

The pub claims to be the oldest pub in the City having been one of the only pubs to have survived the Great Fire of London. It is a Grade II listed building, built in the mid 19th century.
