= The Centre Page =

Pub in the City of London

Coordinates: 51.512460°N 0.0985923°W

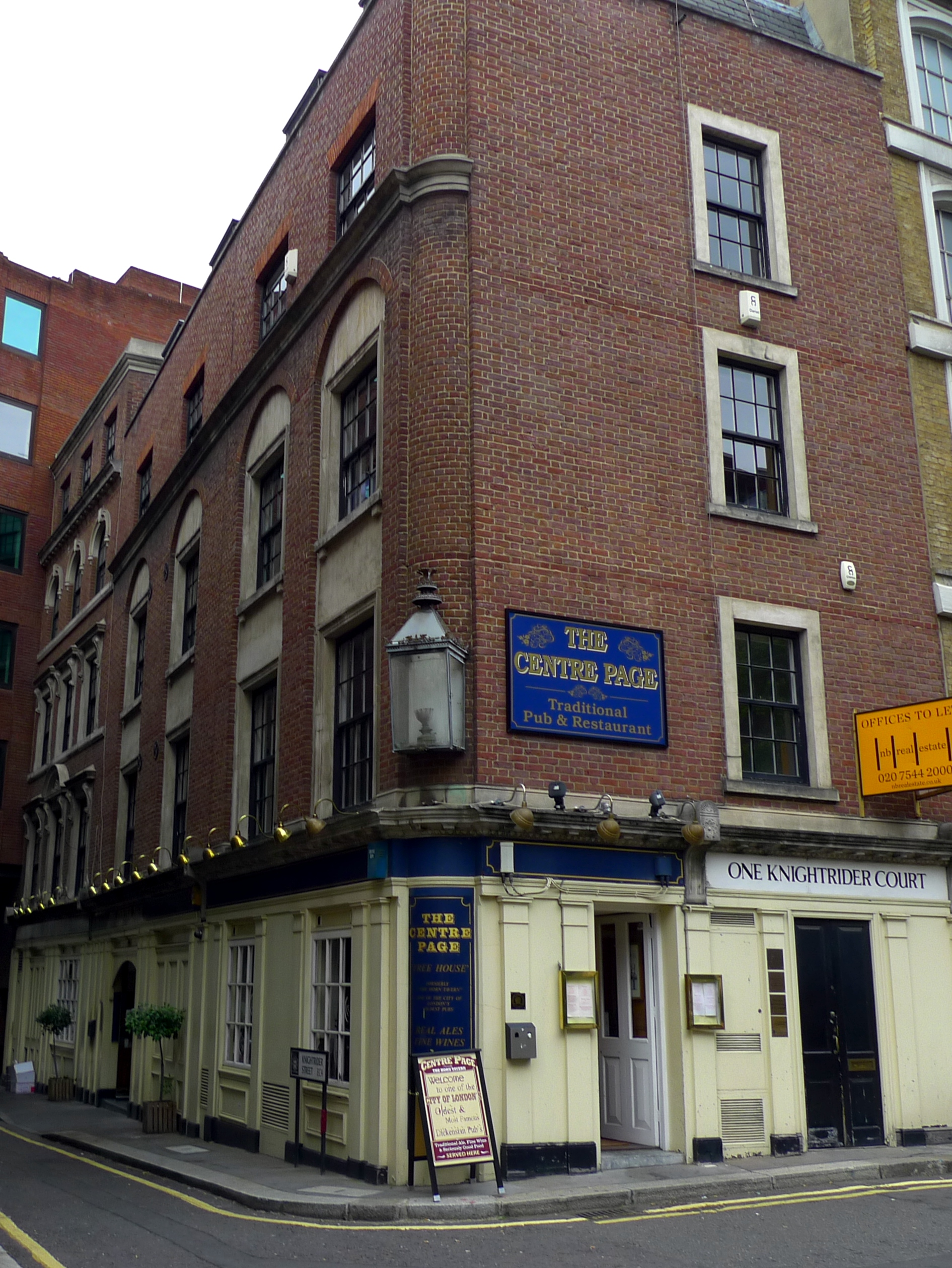
The Centre Page, London EC4

The Centre Page is a pub at 29–33 Knightrider Street, London EC4.

It is a Grade II listed building, built in the mid-19th century, and previously known as The Horn Tavern.
