= The Harrow, London =

Pub in the City of London

Coordinates: 51.512943°N 0.106758°W

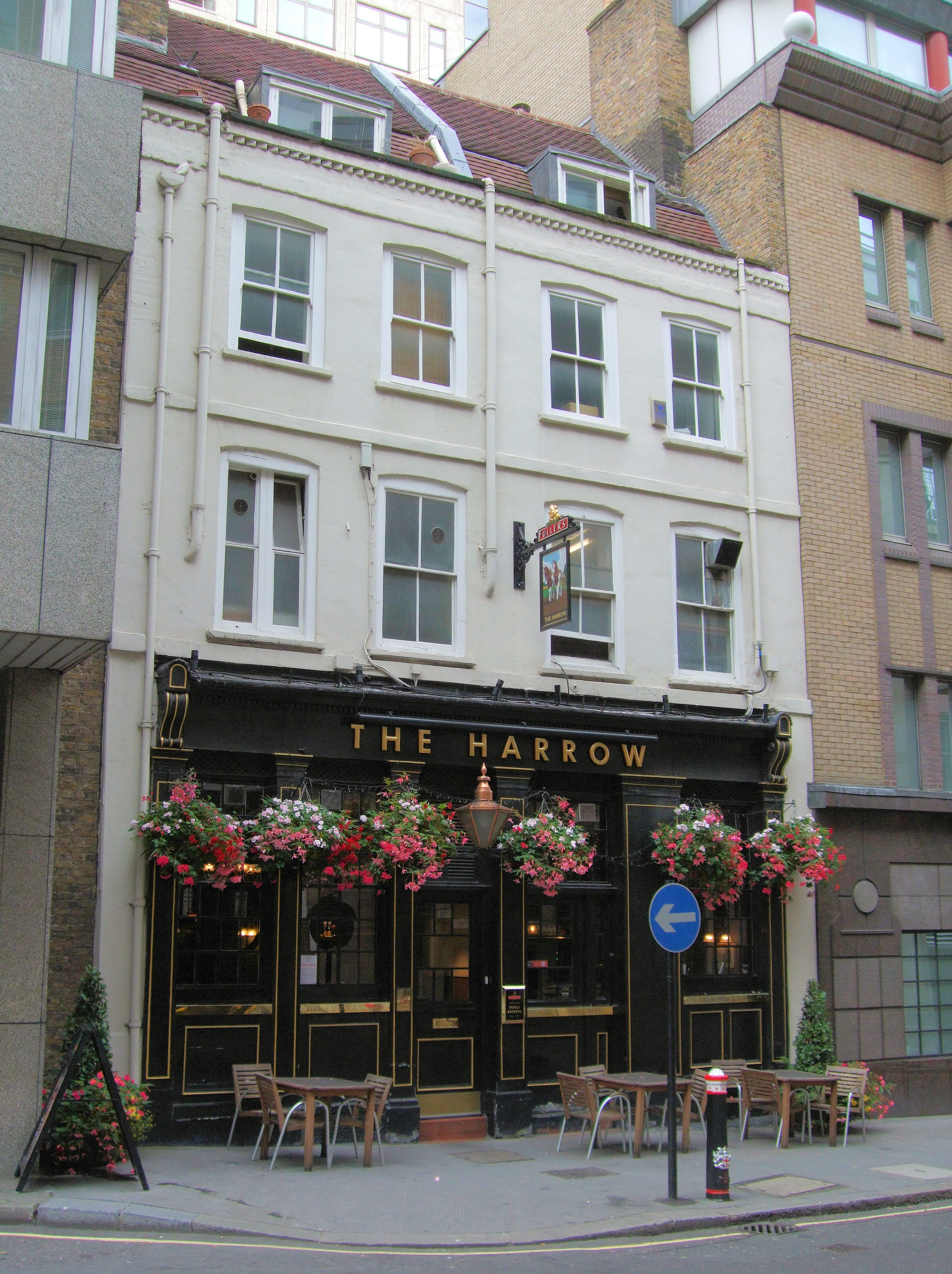
The Harrow

The Harrow is a pub at 22 Whitefriars Street, London.

It is a Grade II listed building, built in the early 18th century, and was originally two houses.
