= Telephone House, London =

Building in London, England

Telephone House
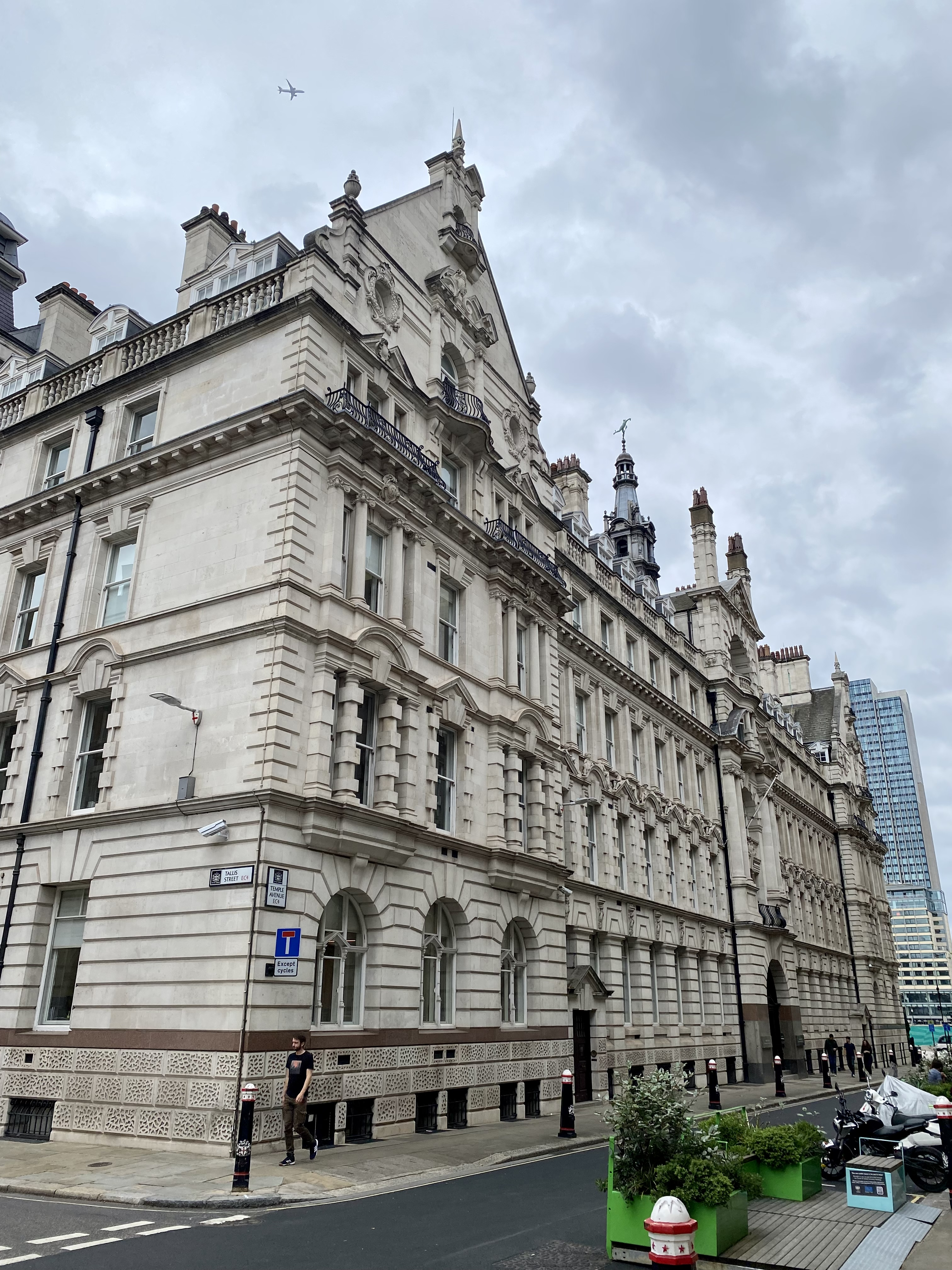
- Telephone House

General information
- Type: Office
- Architectural style: Edwardian Baroque
- Location: London, England
- Coordinates: 51°30′42″N 0°06′28″W
- Completed: 1902

Design and construction
- Architect: Albert Nelson Bromley

Listed Building – Grade II
- Official name: Telephone House
- Designated: 05 June 1972
- Reference no.: 1079128

Telephone House is a Grade II listed office building that stands on the eastern side of Temple Avenue between Tallis Street and the Victoria Embankment.

== History ==
The building was constructed between 1898 and 1902 for the National Telephone Company, which had found success in amalgamating a number of smaller telephone networks. It was designed by Albert Nelson Bromley who worked with the company on a number of their buildings.

The building currently hosts the London offices of Gibson Dunn, although plans to move to offices at One Exchange Square were announced in 2026.

== Description ==
The building sits opposite Hamilton House and Temple Chambers across Temple Avenue and Temple House across Tallis Street. It also stands adjacent to the Neo-Tudor Carmelite House which housed the Daily Mail.

The building's design is a large massing of stone in an early example of an Edwardian Baroque style. The Temple Avenue frontage is decorated in high relief and made of 21 bays. A pedimented centre is flanked by large gabled pavilions at each end. The first floor pediments are topped with cherubs holding telephone handsets.
