= Temple House, London =

Victorian office building in London, England

Coordinates: 51.511989°N 0.107669°W

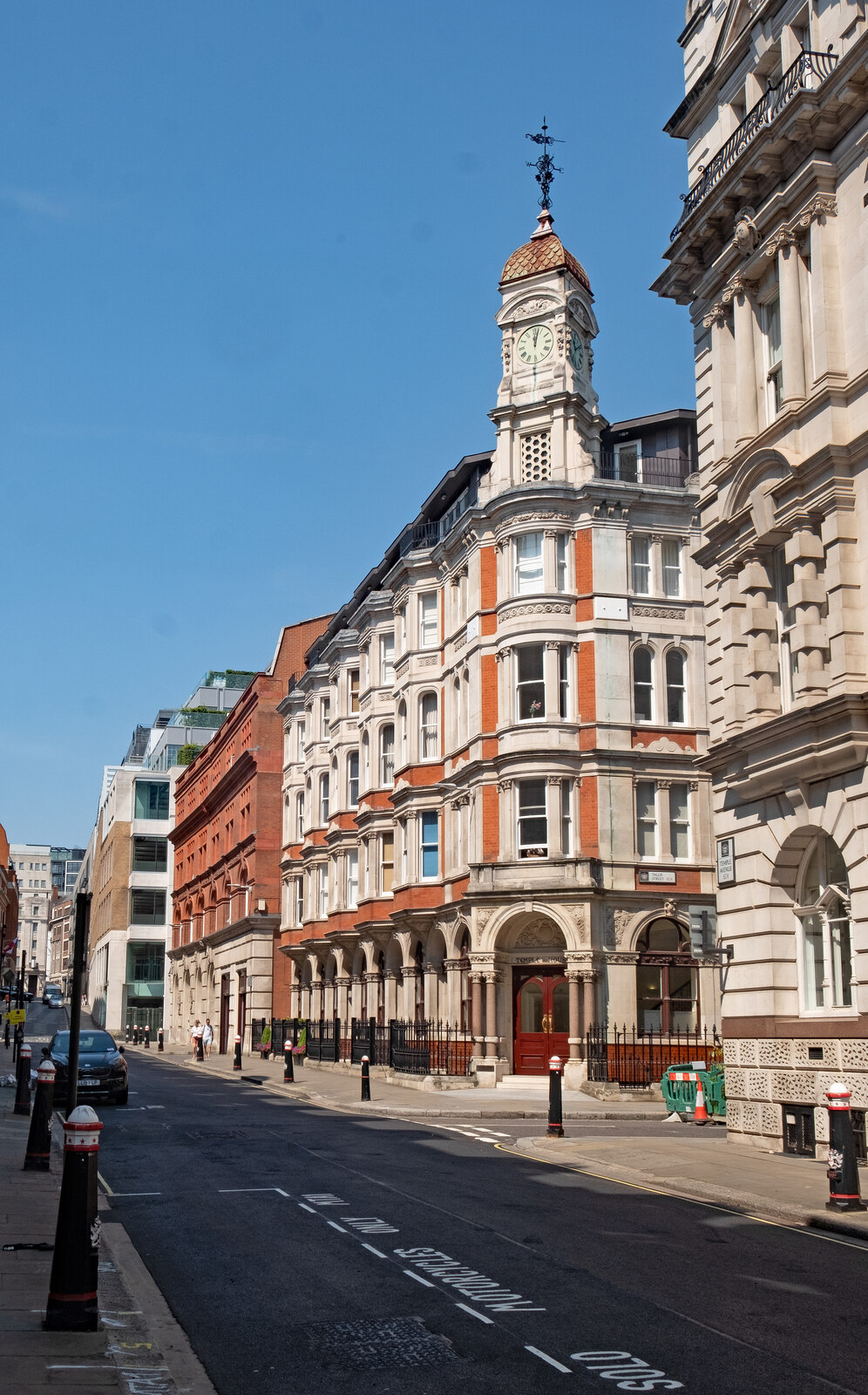
Temple House

Temple House is a Victorian former office building that sits on the corner of Temple Avenue and Tallis Street in the City of London.

== History ==
The buildings were constructed between 1892 and 1894 as one of a number of printing offices built in the area south of Fleet Street, particularly as premises for Horace Marshall & Co. Their construction was encouraged by the City of London Corporation as part of a scheme for street improvements. Other examples are the Former Argus Printing Company Building and Carmelite House. The building was converted to flats in 2002.

== Description ==
The offices are located opposite the Temple Chambers across Temple Avenue and Telephone House across Tallis Street. It is also adjacent to the former Argus works. They are located near Fleet Street, the centre of the London printing and journalism trade.

They are built of red brick with Classical stone detailing to the design of Frederick Boreham. Repeating oriel windows with stained glass adorn the facades. The most notable features is a clock tower on the southwest corner which was intended to be visible from the Thames.
