= Pountney Hill House =

Building in the City of London, England

Coordinates: 51°30′39″N 0°05′19″W

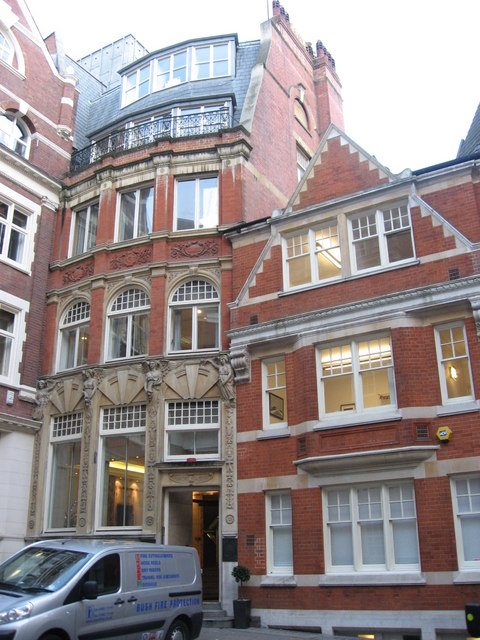
Pountney Hill House (at left)

Pountney Hill House is a Grade II listed building on Laurence Pountney Hill, in the City of London, U.K. It was built in the late 19th century. In 2015, a window cleaner fell to his death while cleaning a window in the building.
