= Hamilton House, London =

Building in London, England

Hamilton House
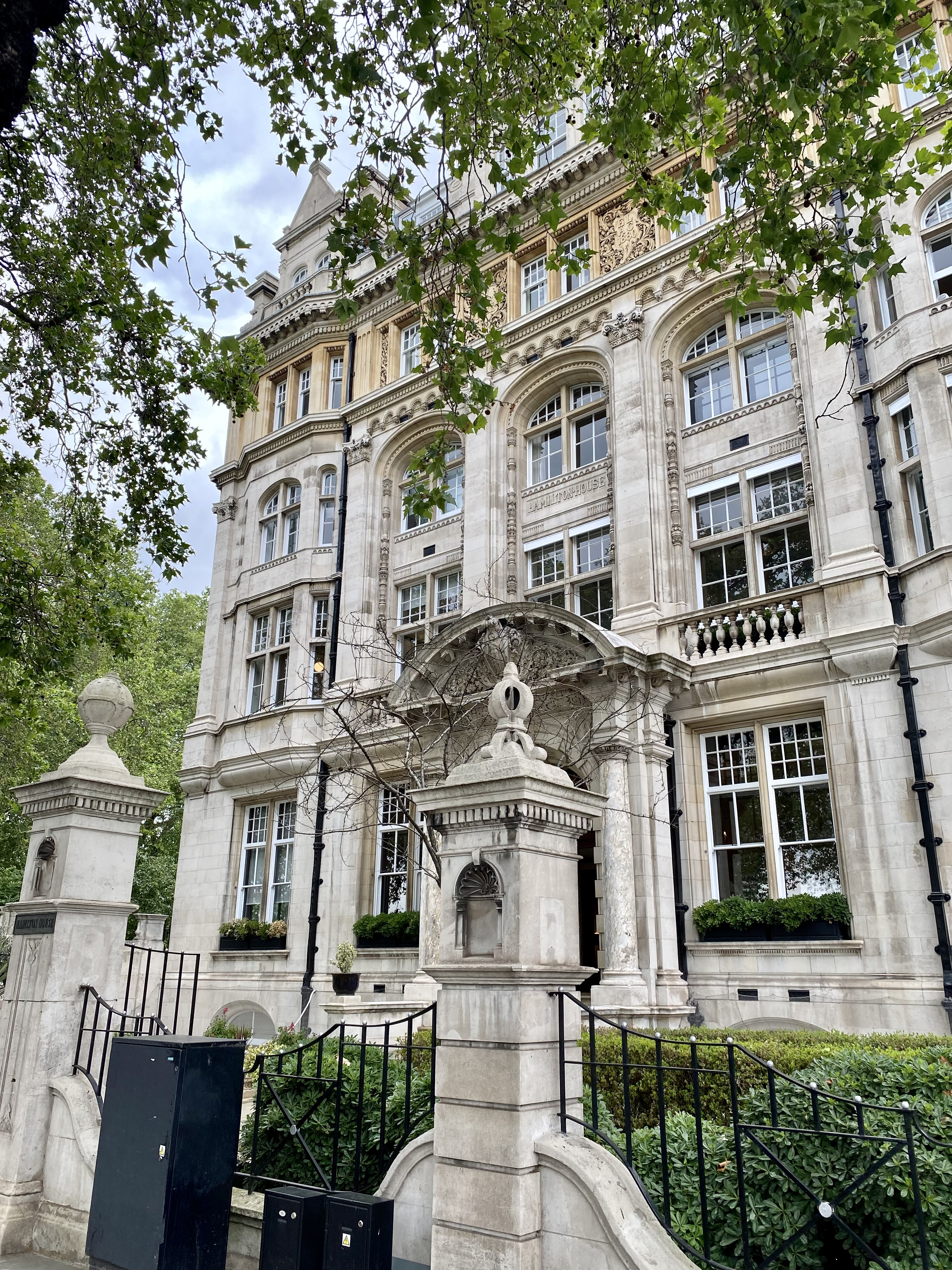
- Hamilton House

General information
- Type: Office
- Architectural style: Renaissance Revival
- Location: London, England
- Coordinates: 51°30′40″N 0°06′30″W
- Completed: 1901

Design and construction
- Architect: William Emerson

Listed Building – Grade II
- Official name: Hamilton House
- Designated: 05 June 1972
- Reference no.: 1079106

Hamilton House is a Grade II listed office building on the Victoria Embankment in London.

== History ==
The building was constructed between 1898 and 1901 for the Employers Liability Corporation. It was designed by Sir William Emerson, and it continues to be used as offices.

== Description ==
The building forms a prominent position, the first building east past the Inner Temple Garden on the Victoria Embankment. It forms a southern extension of the block including Temple Chambers and sits opposite Telephone House on Temple Avenue.

Mostly built in Portland stone, the upper floor uses sandstone, contrasting with the other levels. The building is built in a Renaissance style. Pilasters and oriels punctuate the facade, thin baluster-piers frame the windows, reminiscent of the works of Aston Webb. Large dormers sit on the building's high gabled roof.
