= Hoop and Grapes, Farringdon Street =

Pub on Farringdon Street, City of London

Coordinates: 51.5154°N 0.1050°W

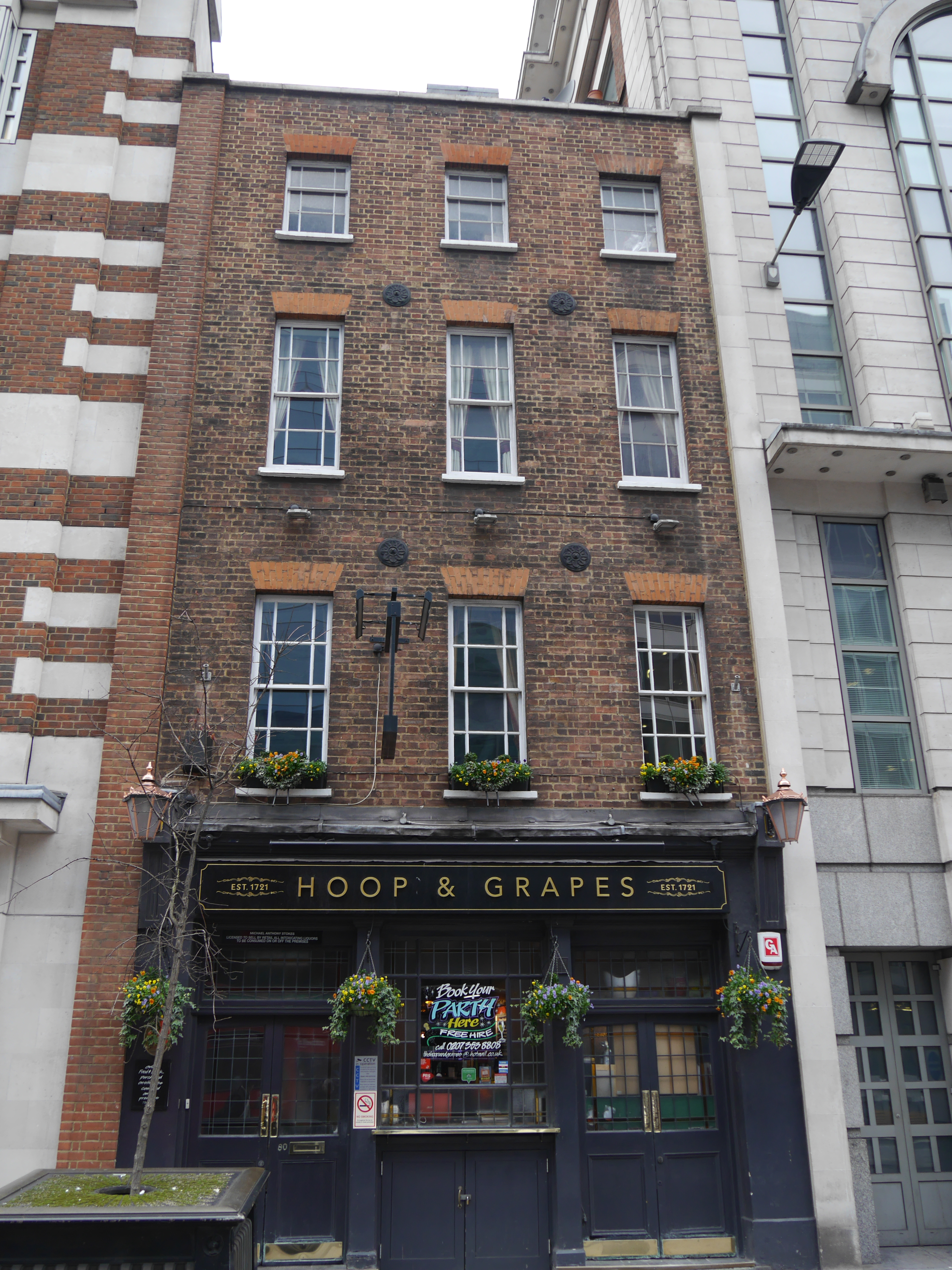
The Hoop and Grapes

The Hoop and Grapes is a grade II listed public house at 80 Farringdon Street in the City of London.

Historic England notes that it was originally a terraced house, built in about 1720 for a vintner, and was converted to a pub in about 1832.

== History ==
Built around 1720 as the home of a vintner (a wine merchant), the Hoop & Grapes was not converted for use as a public house until around 1832. Over the years it has operated under several names including Samuel’s Bar & Restaurant, and the Mash Tun.

This Farringdon pub was originally built on part of a graveyard, a remote site belonging to the nearby St Bride’s Church. Local legend would have you believe that the Hoop & Grapes might have played host to the Fleet Marriages that were, for a time, quite the pocket industry in and around the debtors’ prison on the banks of the (now-subterranean) River Fleet.

Fleet marriages were popular clandestine, unlicensed wedding rites performed for a tidy fee by questionable clerics (often themselves incarcerated in Fleet Prison) under a legal loophole that stated that the church held no authority within the grounds of the prison. The Marriage Act of 1753 put an end to the once-lucrative Fleet Marriage industry long before the Hoop & Grapes started pulling pints for the public around 1832.

Because the pub operated so close to the once newspaper hub of Fleet Street, as well as nearby markets such as Smithfield, the Hoop & Grapes for a time held a special licence to operate between 2am and 5am solely and explicitly for the benefit of these late night and early morning workers. Records show that the landlord was, in 1894, fined a not-insubstantial sum of £5 for serving persons who were not connected with the newspaper or market trades.

The Hoop & Grapes was saved from demolition in 1991 after being granted a Grade II listing while the area around it continued to develop. It stands now as an oasis of historic significance amidst the sheen of central London modernity.

The name 'Hoop & Grapes' likely refers to the metal hoops used to hold barrels together, and the grape-derived wines that will have been the daily business of this 18th-century building even before it became a public house. However, a possible alternative reading of the name is that 'Hoop' could be a corruption of the word 'Hops' and the name might simply refer to the availability of both beers and wines within.
