= 1392 =

1392 in various calendars
- Gregorian calendar: 1392; MCCCXCII
- Ab urbe condita: 2145
- Armenian calendar: 841; ԹՎ ՊԽԱ
- Assyrian calendar: 6142
- Balinese saka calendar: 1313–1314
- Bengali calendar: 798–799
- Berber calendar: 2342
- English Regnal year: 15 Ric. 2 – 16 Ric. 2
- Buddhist calendar: 1936
- Burmese calendar: 754
- Byzantine calendar: 6900–6901
- Chinese calendar: 辛未年 (Metal Goat); 4089 or 3882 — to — 壬申年 (Water Monkey); 4090 or 3883
- Coptic calendar: 1108–1109
- Discordian calendar: 2558
- Ethiopian calendar: 1384–1385
- Hebrew calendar: 5152–5153
- Hindu calendars
- Vikram Samvat: 1448–1449
- Shaka Samvat: 1313–1314
- Kali Yuga: 4492–4493
- Holocene calendar: 11392
- Igbo calendar: 392–393
- Iranian calendar: 770–771
- Islamic calendar: 794–795
- Japanese calendar: Meitoku 3 (明徳３年)
- Javanese calendar: 1305–1307
- Julian calendar: 1392; MCCCXCII
- Korean calendar: 3725
- Minguo calendar: 520 before ROC 民前520年
- Nanakshahi calendar: −76
- Thai solar calendar: 1934–1935
- Tibetan calendar: ལྕགས་མོ་ལུག་ལོ་ (female Iron-Sheep); 1518 or 1137 or 365 — to — ཆུ་ཕོ་སྤྲེ་ལོ་ (male Water-Monkey); 1519 or 1138 or 366

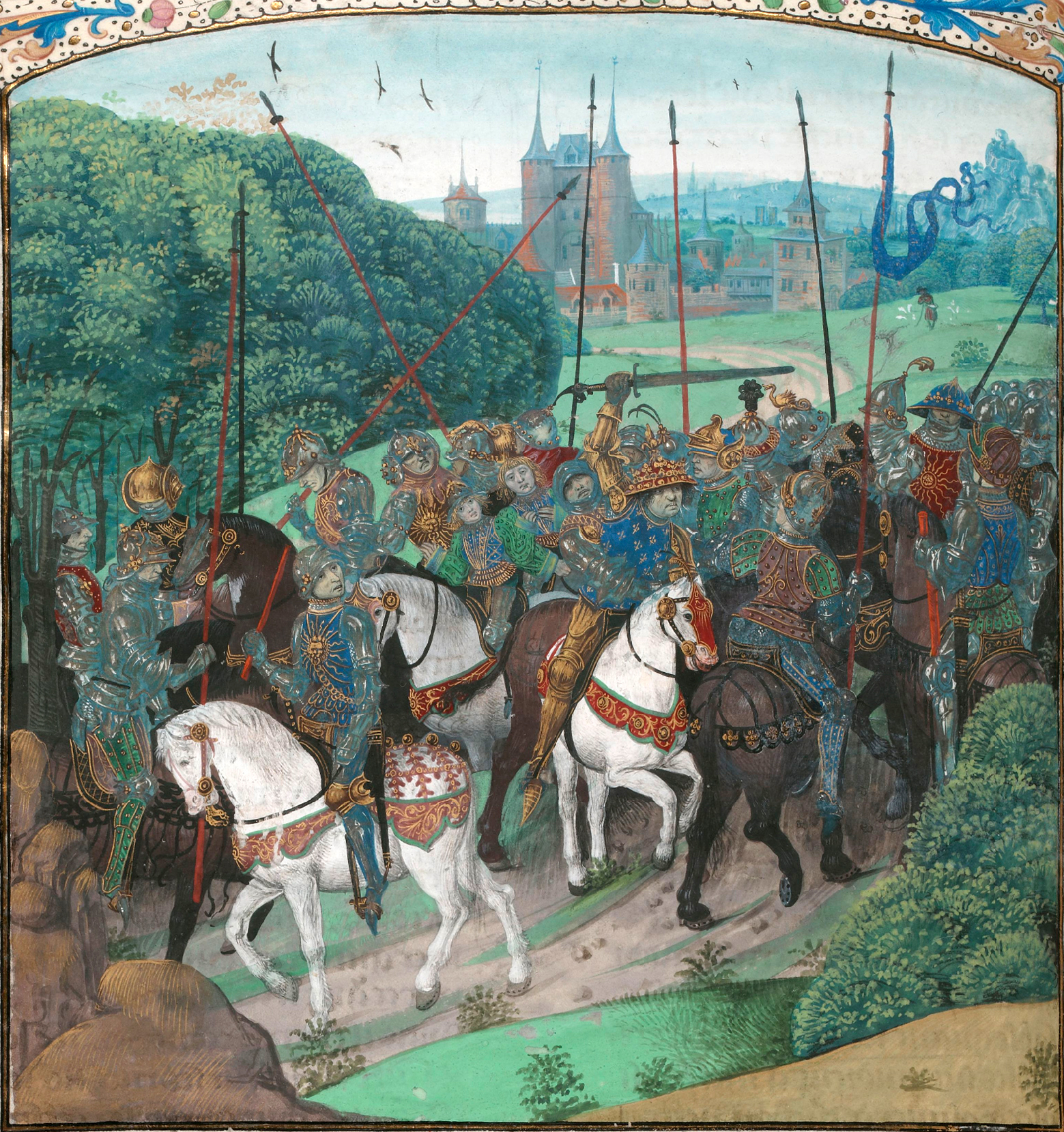
August 5: King Charles VI of France first displays psychosis and attacks his own soldiers.

Year 1392 (MCCCXCII) was a leap year starting on Monday (link will display full calendar) of the Julian calendar.

== Events ==
=== January–March ===
- January 16 – The semi-independent Serbian state (sanjak) of Uskup is annexed by the Ottoman Empire and General Pasha Yiğit Bey becomes the first Ottoman governor of the new province.
- January 20 – A treaty halts the first of the Florentine–Milanese Wars after the Republic of Florence has liberated Padua from control by the Duchy of Milan. The treaty confirms the boundaries of Florence and Milan as they existed before the war, with the exception of Padua's new independence.
- February 3 – Brancaleone Doria, the conqueror of most of the island of Sardinia, announces that he has recovered most of the territories that had been captured by his challenger, Martin of Aragon.
- February 10 – Helena Dragaš, a descendant of King Stefan III Dečanski of Serbia, marries the Byzantine Emperor Manuel II Palaiologos, and is crowned the next day as the Empress Consort of the Byzantine Empire.
- March 16 – A fleet from Sicily, commanded by King Martin of Aragon, arrives at Capo San Marco on the island of Sardinia and makes, an unsuccessful attempt to capture the Sardinian leader Brancaleone Doria.

=== April–June ===
- April 11 – In order to prevent an attack by the Duchy of Milan, led by Lord Gian Galeazzo Visconti, the Republic of Florence forms the League of Bologna, a defensive alliance with other Italian city-states of Bologna, Padua, Ferrara, Imola, Faenza and Ravenna.
- May 29 – After the Fleet Street riot in London, King Richard II of England summons Lord Mayor of London, John Hende, along with the London sheriff and deputies, and aldermen to appear before him at Nottingham Castle on June 25 for a hearing on unspecified charges.
- June 4 – Louis de Valois is created first Duke of Orléans of the second creation.
- June 13 – An assassination attempt by Pierre de Craon against Olivier V de Clisson, Constable of France, fails.
- June 16 – Antoniotto di Montaldo is elected as the new Doge of the Republic of Genoa upon the resignation of Antoniotto Adorno.
- June 25 – At a hearing at Nottingham Council concerning the Fleet Street riot, King Richard II of England orders that London's Mayor Hende is to be arrested, removed from office and imprisoned.

=== July–September ===
- July 1 – King Charles VI of France, outraged at an attempt to assassinate his advisor Olivier V de Clisson, leads an invasion against the Duchy of Brittany and Duke Jean V for harboring the perpetrator, Pierre de Craon.
- July 22 – After a second hearing at Nottingham Council concerning the Fleet Street riot, former London Mayor John Hende and other imprisoned city officials are assessed a fine and released from prison after posting bond to secure their return for future charges.
- August 4 – King Jogaila of Poland and Lithuania appoints his cousin Vytautas the Great as regent of Lithuania, in return for Vytautas giving up his claim to the Lithuanian throne. Vytautas replaces Jogaila's unpopular brother Skirgaila as regent.
- August 5
  - At Gaegyeong, General Yi Sŏng-gye crowns himself King Taejo of Korea, ending the Goryeo dynasty in the Korean Peninsula, and establishing the Joseon dynasty, which will last for more than 500 years.
  - King Charles VI of France (later known as "Charles the Mad") first displays symptoms of psychosis while crossing through the forests of Le Mans, attacking his own soldiers with his sword while under the delusion that they are enemy troops from the Duchy of Brittany. Charles' madness enables Philip II, Duke of Burgundy, to strengthen his power in the French court.
- September 7 – Yi Pangsŏk, at 10 years old the youngest son of King Taejo of Korea, is designated as the heir to the throne.
- September 23 – Aleid van Poelgeest, the mistress of Count Albert of Holland, is found dead at the Altena Castle in The Hague, along with the Count's chamberlain, Willem Cuser, the victim of Hook nobles who were opposed to Count Albert.
- September 24 – Zhu Yuanzhang, the Hongwu Emperor of Ming dynasty China, declares that all males must wear the queue hairstyle.
- September 28 – Prince Zhu Yunwen is designated as the heir to the throne of China by his father, the Emperor Zhu Yuanzhang.

=== October–December ===
- October 5 – (16 Dhu al-Qadah 794 AH) Muhammed VII succeeds his father, Yusuf II, as Sultan of the Emirate of Granada (modern-day southern Spain).
- October 15 – (28th year of 9th month of Meitoku 3) The division of Japan between the Southern Court (with a capital at Yoshino) and the Northern Court) (with a capital at Heian-kyō, now Kyoto) ends as the southern Emperor Go-Kameyama agrees to recognize northern Emperor Go-Komatsu as the ruler of the entire nation.
- November 19 – (5th day of the leap month of Meitoku 3) Emperor Go-Kameyama of Japan abdicates in favor of rival claimant Go-Komatsu, in order to end the nanboku-cho period of conflict between the Northern and Southern imperial courts.
- November 23 – King Richard II of England summons the English Parliament to assemble at Winchester on January 20.
- December 10 – The Parliament of France condemns the kingdom's Constable, Olivier V de Clisson, for having illegally enriched himself at the expense of King Charles VI.

=== Date unknown ===
- Franciscan friar James of Jülich is boiled alive, for impersonating a bishop and ordaining his own priests.
- Maria, Queen of Sicily defeats an army of rebel barons.
- William le Scrope succeeds William II de Montacute, as King of Mann.
- Seoan mac Pilib succeeds Tomas mor mac Mathghamhna as King of East Breifne, in north-central Ireland.
- The city of Afyonkarahisar (in modern-day western Turkey) is conquered by Sultan Beyazid I, of the Ottoman Empire.
- Erfurt University is founded in Erfurt, central Germany.
- Penistone Grammar School, later to be one of the first community comprehensive schools in England, is founded near Barnsley, England.

== Births ==
- January 10 – Johanna van Polanen, Dutch noblewoman (d. 1445)
- December 9 – Peter, Duke of Coimbra (d. 1449)
- December 18 – John VIII Palaiologos, penultimate Byzantine emperor (d. 1448)
- date unknown
  - Alain Chartier, French poet and political writer (approximate date; d. c. 1430)
  - Flavio Biondo, Italian humanist and historian (d. 1463)
  - Barbara of Cilli, Holy Roman Empress, queen consort of Hungary and Bohemia (d. 1451)
  - John de Mowbray, 2nd Duke of Norfolk (d. 1432)
  - John II of Ligny, French nobleman (d. 1441)
  - Filippo Maria Visconti, Duke of Milan (d. 1447)
  - Idris Imad al-Din, supreme leader of Tayyibi Isma'ilism, scholar and historian (d. 1468)

== Deaths ==
- March 25 – Hosokawa Yoriyuki, Japanese samurai
- April 26 – Chŏng Mong-ju, Korean civil minister, diplomat and scholar (b. 1338)
- May 17 – Zhu Biao, crown prince of the Ming dynasty, China (b. 1355)
- November 22 – Robert de Vere, 9th Earl of Oxford and Duke of Ireland (b. 1362)
- December 23 – Isabella of Castile, Duchess of York (b. 1355)
- date unknown
  - Abbot Methodius of Peshnosha, Eastern Orthodox saint
  - Lalleshwari, Kashmiri poet and mystic (b. 1320)
