= John Waltham =

14th-century Bishop of Salisbury and Treasurer of England

- Bishop of Salisbury
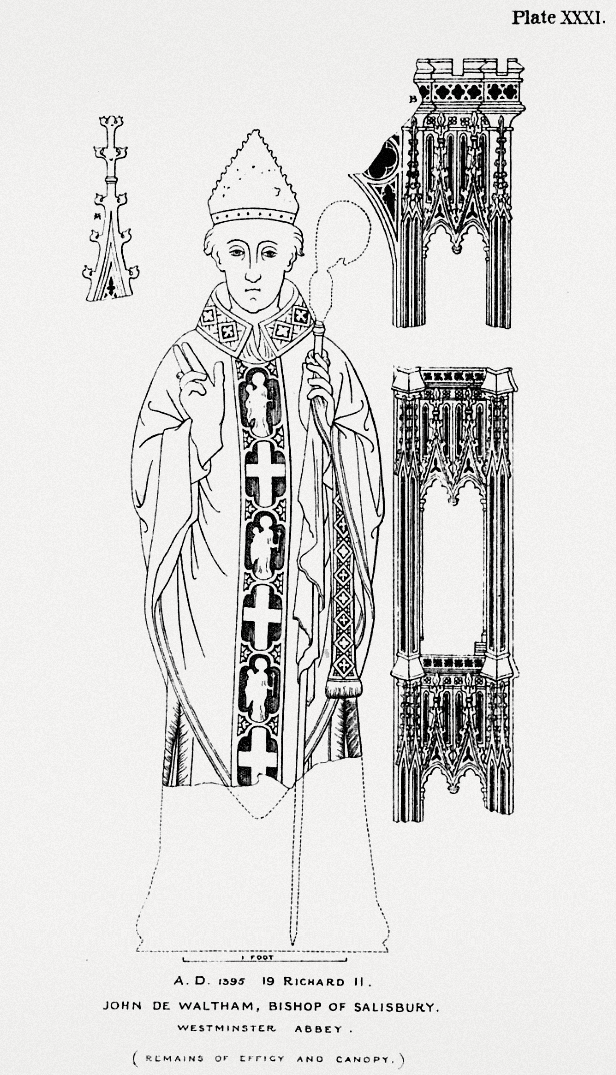
- 1860 illustration of the monumental brass of John de Waltham
- Appointed: 3 April 1388
- Term ended: 17 September 1395
- Predecessor: Ralph Ergham
- Successor: Richard Mitford
- Previous post: Archdeacon of Richmond

Orders
- Consecration: 20 September 1388

Personal details
- Born: Waltham, North East Lincolnshire
- Died: 17 September 1395
- Denomination: Catholic

John Waltham (or John de Waltham) was a priest and high-ranking government official in England in the 14th century. He held a number of ecclesiastical and civic positions during the reigns of King Edward III and Richard II, eventually rising to become Lord High Treasurer, Lord Privy Seal of England and Bishop of Salisbury. He is buried in Westminster Abbey, London.

== Early life ==
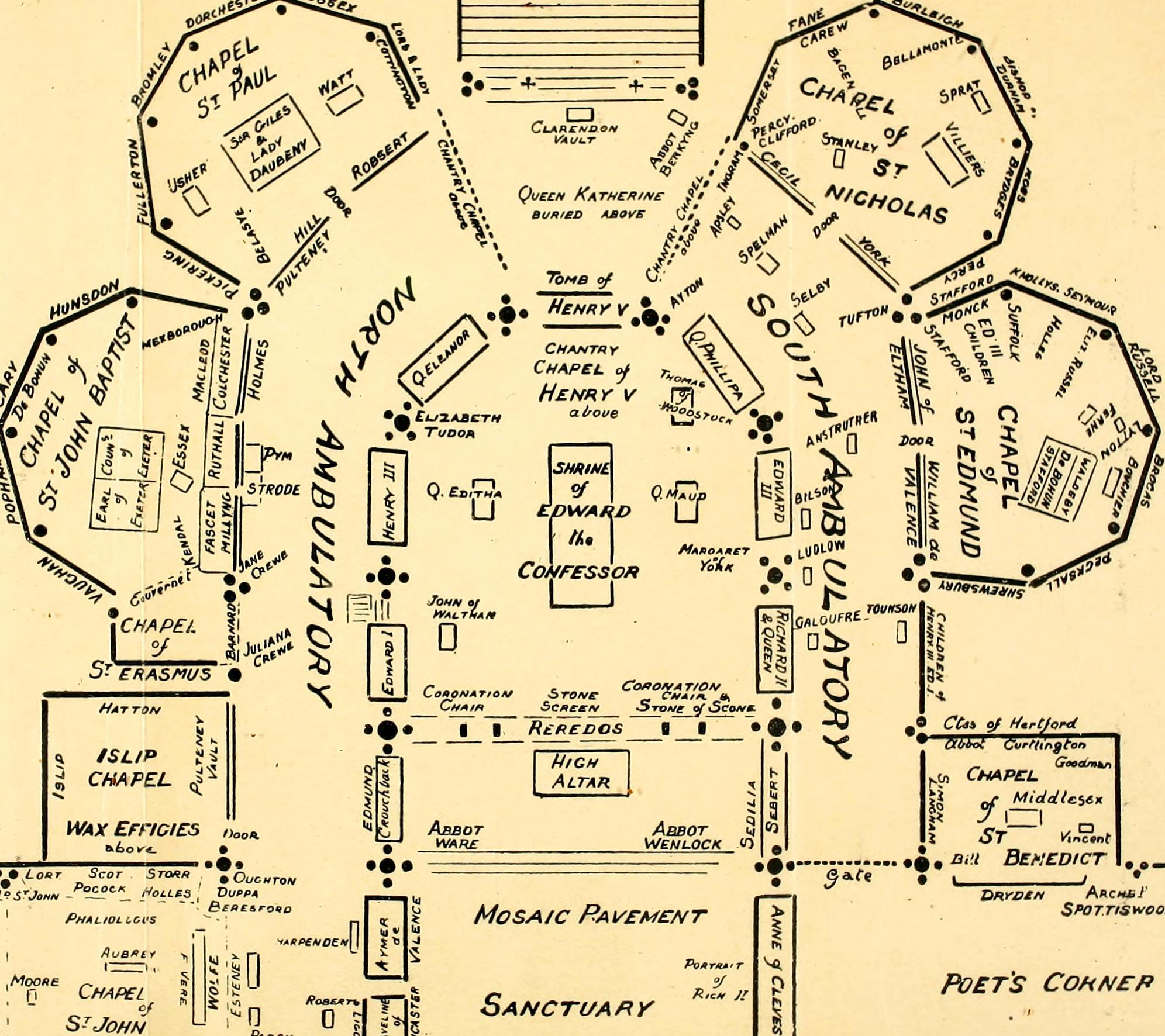
1906 plan of Westminster Abbey showing Waltham's tomb in Edward the Confessor's Chapel

It is thought that Waltham was born in Waltham, Lincolnshire (although some sources identify his birthplace as Waltham in Essex – the historian Thomas Fuller wrote in 1655, "Amongst the natives of Waltham for statesmen, de Waltham bears away the bell".). He was the son of John and Margaret Waltham, whose memorial brass still exists in the chancel of All Saints' Church in Waltham.

Waltham's great uncle was John of Thoresby, Lord Chancellor of England and Archbishop of York. John de Waltham is not to be confused with contemporary relatives of the same name; according to records, there was an elder John Waltham who was the nephew of Thoresby and the uncle of the younger John Waltham. This elder Waltham, who died in 1384, became canon and sub-dean of York. Confusingly, his will refers to his brother, also called John, who is thought to be the father of the younger John Waltham.

== Priesthood and civil posts ==
As a priest, Waltham held a number of senior positions. He held the position of prebendary of Dunham in the Cathedral Church of Southwell, but resigned this post in 1361; 20 November of that year he was appointed prebendary of Lichfield Cathedral. He also held the post of prebendary at Rampton, Nottinghamshire until 1383.

On 25 October 1368 Waltham was nominated prebendary of South Newbald in York Minster, an appointment which was ratified by the King Edward III on 7 October 1370.

In 1378 Waltham held a brief position as rector at the Parish Church of St. Mary, South Kelsey in the Diocese of Lincoln, from February to May of that year, being presented to the church of in the king's gift. In the following year, Waltham was offered the post of canon at the Collegiate Church of St Mary and St Cuthbert, Chester-le-Street in the Diocese of Durham, but instead he took up a post at the church of Grendon in the diocese of Lincoln on 17 June 1379. Three months later, on 18 September, Waltham was nominated to a canonry at St Andrew's Collegiate Church in Bishop Auckland, County Durham. He was presented by King Richard II as rector of the Church of St Peter, Great Berkhamsted on 27 December 1379, a post which he held for under two years before he resigned on 22 April 1381. Waltham held the office of Archdeacon of Richmond from 1385 to 1388.

Waltham served as Master of the Rolls of the Court of Chancery, the court of equity in England, from 1381 to 1386. During this appointment, he extend the jurisdiction of the Court of Chancery. Waltham is credited as the inventor of the writ of subpoena, having devised this court order to compel defendants to attend a trial.

In 1386, Waltham was appointed Lord Privy Seal, a post he held until 1389. He served as Lord Treasurer from 1391 until his death in 1395.

In May 1388 Waltham served as one of the commissioners at the trial of Alexander Neville, Archbishop of York, Robert de Vere, Earl of Oxford and duke of Ireland, Michael de la Pole, Earl of Suffolk, and others.

Pope Urban VI conferred the See of Salisbury on Waltham on 3 April 1388, and he was consecrated Bishop of Salisbury on 20 September 1388 at a ceremony attended by King Richard II. During his reign as bishop, Waltham challenged the authority of the Archbishop of Canterbury, William Courtenay, by refusing a canonical visitation in 1390; threatened with a sentence of excommunication by Courtenay, Waltham submitted. At this time, the teachings of John Wycliffe and the Lollards were gaining popularity, and to suppress this movement, Waltham compelled the mayor and city of Salisbury to submit to the episcopal court and to prohibit conventicle meetings.

Chroniclers note that, as Bishop of Salisbury, Waltham occupied a lodging on Fleet Street in London, Salisbury Court. There is an account of a riot taking place there in 1392 when a yeoman of the Bishops of Salisbury named Romayn stole a loaf of horsebread from baker's basket; the baker assaulted the yeoman with an axe, breaking his skull, and the yeoman fled to take sanctuary from arrest in the bishop's inn. During the riot that ensued, the Bishop of Salisbury's house was attacked. After the riot, a number of London civic dignitaries were imprisoned and the king intervened to replace the Mayor of London.

Waltham was amongst a group of men appointed by the Wonderful Parliament of 1386 to reform government and to break the influence of Richard's inner circle of favourites There is some evidence that Waltham may initially have been sympathetic to the Appellant cause, but it is known that Waltham became a favourite and close friend of the king from about 1390. Richard's favour was evident when he appointed Waltham Lord Treasurer in 1391. The relationship between Waltham and the king has been a matter of speculation; it has been claimed that there was "scandalous talk of the king's affection for him", but Richard's reputation was widely maligned after his downfall by his detractors (Thomas Walsingham notably made revisions to his Chronicle in 1394 which made allegations about Richard's relationship with Robert de Vere)

== Death and burial ==
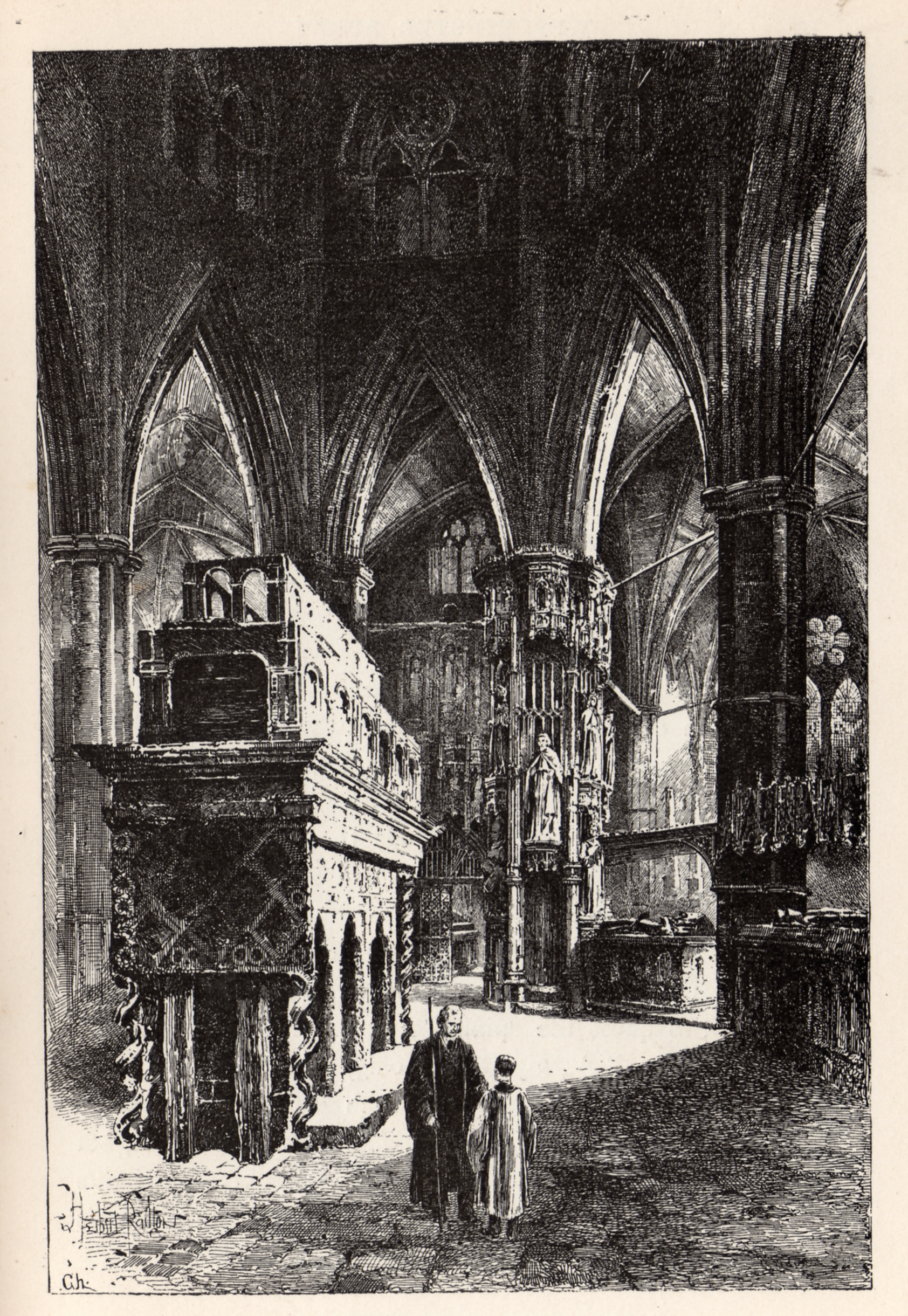
John Waltham's final resting place: Edward the Confessor's Chapel in Westminster Abbey

After serving seven years as bishop, Waltham died on 17 September 1395. King Richard mourned Waltham's passing. The chronicler John Weever noted in 1631, "King Richard II loved him intireiy, and greatly bewaled his death. In token whereof he commanded that he should be buried here among the kings."

Upon his death, Waltham had wished to be buried within Salisbury Cathedral, but the king intervened and ordered that Waltham should be given a tomb in Westminster Abbey, London. He sent Sir William Scrope to claim the body from Salisbury, and Waltham's remains were brought to London to be buried in the Chapel of Edward the Confessor, the only person not of royal blood to be buried in the royal chapel. The decision to grant to a commoner a grave amongst the Kings of England caused controversy, and in an attempt to appease detractors, Richard made a gift to the Abbey of a large sum of money and two copes. Saul notes that Richard had made similar interventions in the burial of other supporters and friends, including those of John Hawkwood and Archbishop Courtenay, suggesting that his "finely honed sense of the theatrical possibilities of burial" was a strategy to project an image of power. After Richard's downfall and death, he was buried in All Saints, King's Langley in 1400, but later re-entombed in Edward the Confessor's Chapel in Westminster Abbey in 1413.

Waltham's grave is located in the north-west corner of the chapel, close to the tombs of Edward the Confessor and Richard II and Anne. A memorial brass (now severely damaged) in the chapel pavement depicts Waltham dressed in mass vestments, wearing an episcopal mitre and carrying a pastoral crosier. His chasuble is decorated with illustrations of the Virgin Mary and he is surrounded by an ornate gothic triple canopy with figures in the niches. A detailed description of the brass in 1825 by Thomas Moule suggested that the niches contained the likenesses of saints named John to reflect Waltham's given name – Saint John the Evangelist, Saint John of Beverley, Saint John Elemosiner – and Saint Peter.

== Citations ==
Political offices
Preceded by Walter Skirclaw	Lord Privy Seal; 1386–1389	Succeeded by Edmund Stafford
Preceded by John Gilbert	Lord High Treasurer; 1391–1395	Succeeded by Roger Walden
Catholic Church titles
Preceded by Ralph Ergham	Bishop of Salisbury; 1388–1395	Succeeded by Richard Mitford
