= Mantuan War =

Mantuan War can refer to:

- Second Florentine–Milanese War
- War of the Mantuan Succession
