= The Punch Tavern =

Pub in the City of London

Coordinates: 51°30′50″N 0°06′18″W

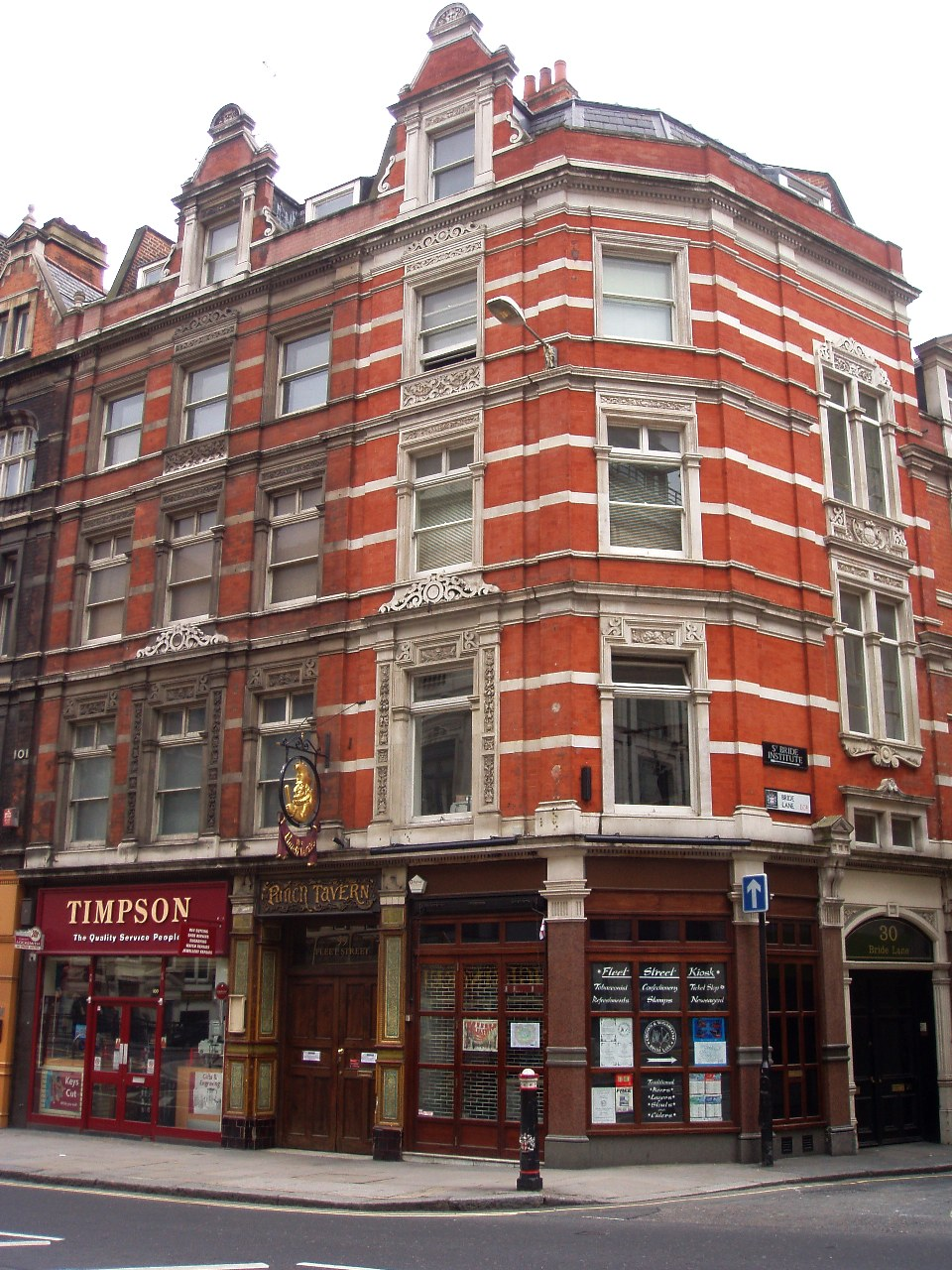
The Punch Tavern

The Punch Tavern is a Grade II listed public house at 98–100 Fleet Street, Holborn, London.

The pub previously on this site was called the Crown and Sugar Loaf, but was renamed as the Punch Tavern in the 1840s, as Punch magazine had its office nearby at that end of Fleet Street. It was rebuilt by the architects Saville and Martin in two phases, first the main part area of the pub and its Fleet Street frontage in 1894–95, and then its Bride Lane frontage with a "Luncheon Bar" behind in 1896–97.

== Gallery ==
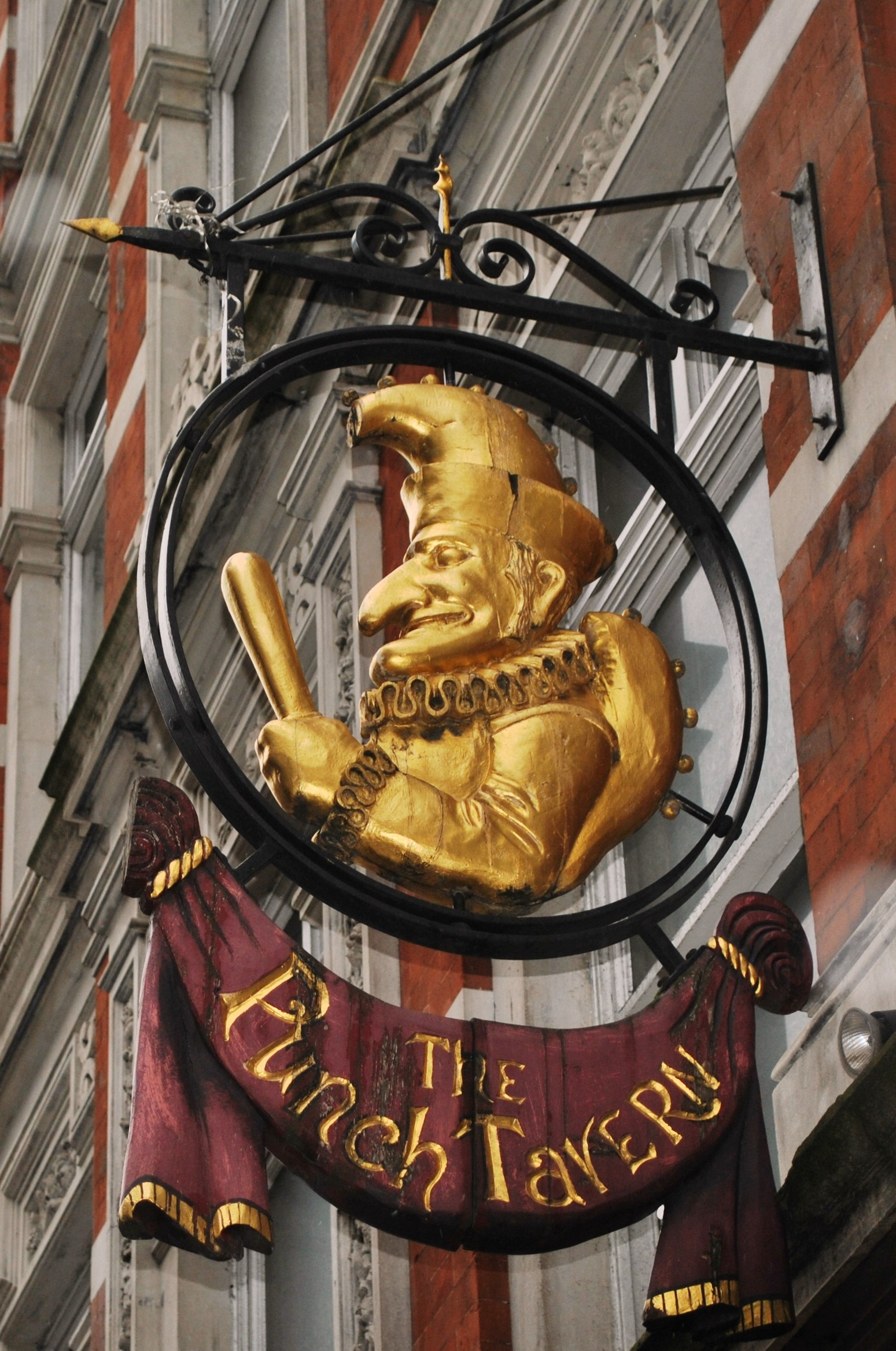

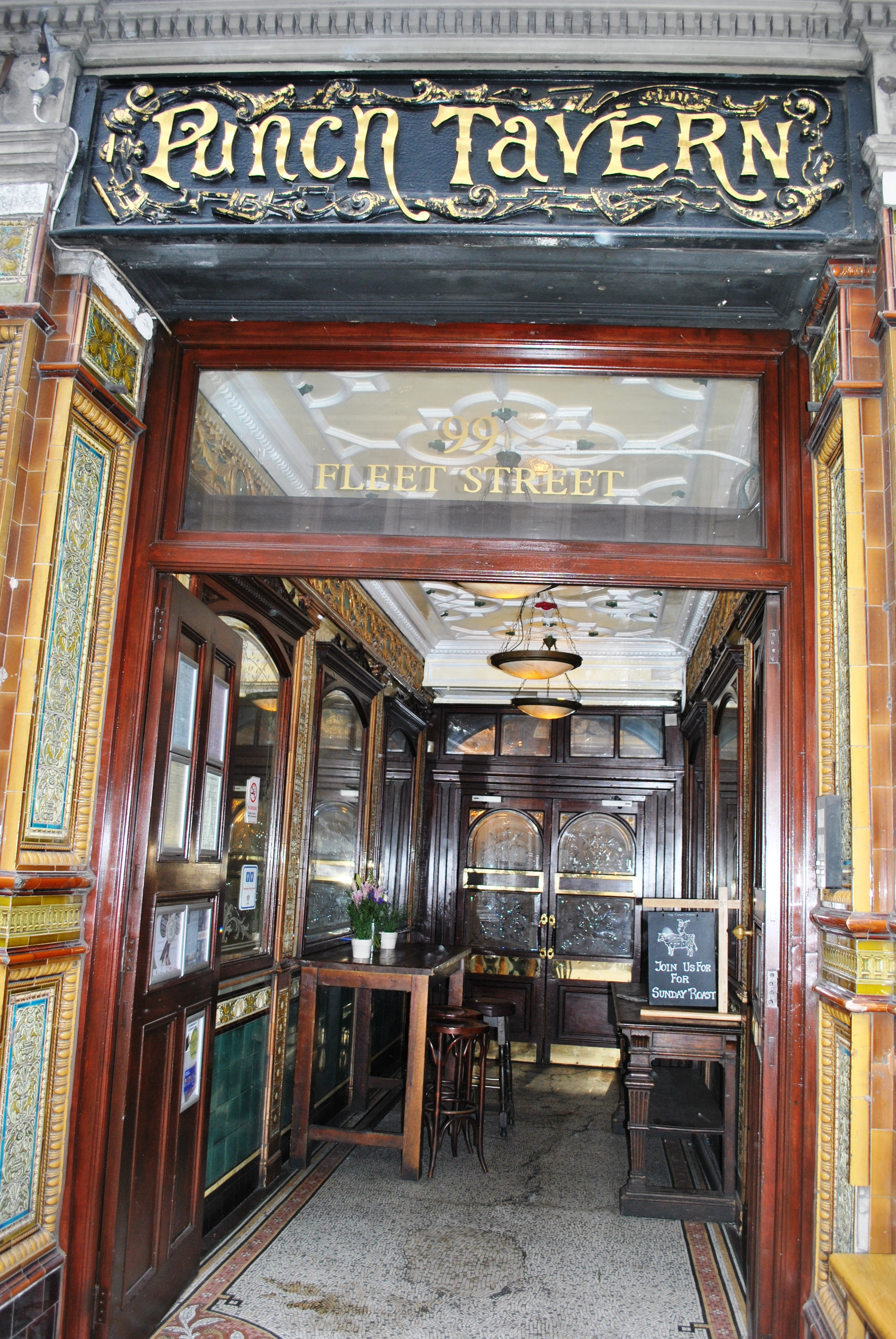
