= The Tipperary =

Listed pub in Holborn, London, England

- The pub in 2023
- Former names: Boar's Head

General information
- Status: Temporarily closed (as of November 2026)
- Type: Public house
- Location: 66 Fleet Street, Holborn London, England
- Coordinates: 51.51404°N 0.10763°W
- Year built: c. 1895; 131 years ago
- Renovated: 20th century (frontage) c. 2023 (restored)
- Client: J. G. Mooney & Co.
- Owner: Independent

Design and construction
- Architect: R. L. Cox
- Designations

Listed Building – Grade II
- Official name: Tipperary public house
- Designated: 28 January 1987
- Reference no.: 1251734

The Tipperary is a Grade II listed public house on Fleet Street in Holborn, London, England. The pub, which traces its origins to the former Boar's Head, is associated with the Dublin pub company J. G. Mooney & Co., which rebuilt the premises around 1895 to designs by R. L. Cox. It is noted for its historic Irish character and retains elements of its late Victorian interior, including mosaic work, decorative glazing and wood panelling. The pub is included on the Campaign for Real Ale (CAMRA)'s National Inventory of Historic Pub Interiors, where it is rated as an interior of "outstanding national historic importance".

== History ==
According to the City of London Corporation, the public house originated as the Boar's Head in 1605. The pub's listed-building entry dates it to around 1667, although the Campaign for Real Ale (CAMRA) states that the earlier building was demolished following its acquisition by J. G. Mooney & Co of Dublin in 1895 and replaced by the present structure, which was designed by the architect R. L. Cox. Its Irish identity was reflected in features such as shamrock-themed mosaic flooring and decorative details associated with Mooney's, traces of which survive, including mosaic lettering at the entrance. CAMRA notes that the pub became associated with journalists from nearby Fleet Street, who were among its regular customers. Sources also differ on when it adopted the name Tipperary, although it has been linked to the wartime song "It's a Long Way to Tipperary".

The pub was acquired by Greene King in the 1980s and subsequently passed into private ownership. On 28 January 1987, The Tipperary was designated a Grade II listed building. CAMRA regards it as having an interior of "outstanding national historic importance" and awards it a three-star rating on its National Inventory of Historic Pub Interiors. After closing during the COVID-19 pandemic, it reopened in 2024 following restoration and repair works. Later that year, it closed again to accommodate redevelopment works at the adjoining property. The scheme includes works affecting the rear of the pub and is intended to enhance its facilities and accessibility, with reopening anticipated in 2027.

== Architecture ==
=== Exterior ===
The building is constructed of stuccoed brick and rises to four storeys with an attic. It has a two-bay frontage, with an early 20th-century pub front at ground-floor level. The upper floors contain square-headed windows with moulded surrounds, and cornices above the ground-floor, first-floor and third-floor windows.

=== Interior ===
The interior in 2018

The pub retains elements of its late Victorian interior from the rebuilding undertaken by Mooney's. These include dark wood panelling along one wall, incorporating small bevelled mirrors and decorative glass advertising panels for stout and whisky, signed by H. West of Houghton Street, Strand. The entrance porch retains mosaic work, including Mooney's lettering, while shamrock motifs in the floor reflect the pub's Irish identity. The ground floor is arranged as a long, narrow bar, and an original staircase survives at the rear of the building. An upstairs room, known as the Boar's Head Bar, takes its name from the pub's former title.

== See also ==
- List of pubs in London
