= Richard Mitford =

14th-century Bishop of Chichester and Bishop of Salisbury

- Bishop of Salisbury
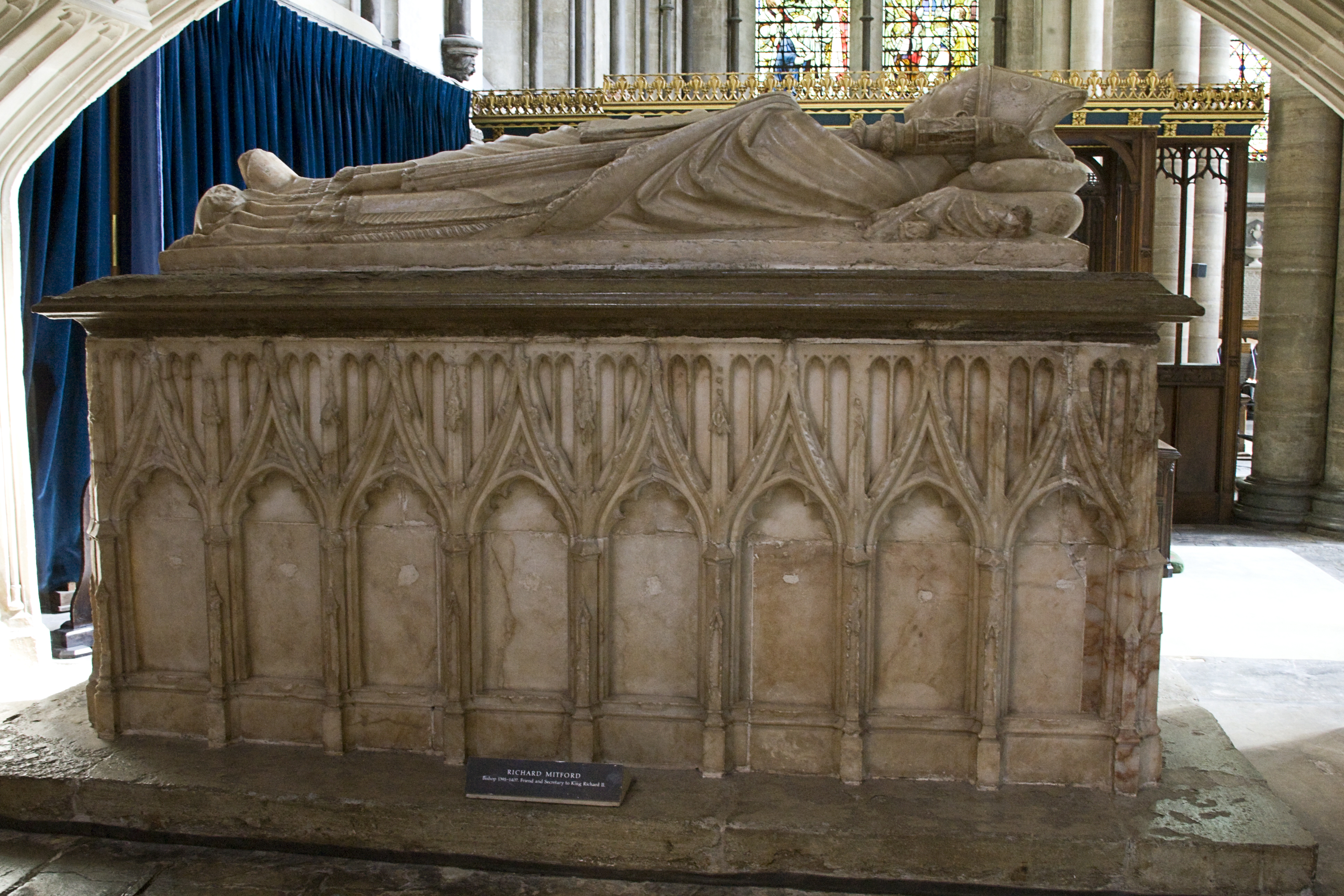
- Tomb of Richard Mitford in Salisbury Cathedral
- Appointed: 25 October 1395
- Term ended: 3 May 1407
- Predecessor: John Waltham
- Successor: Nicholas Bubwith
- Previous post: Bishop of Chichester

Orders
- Consecration: 10 April 1390

Personal details
- Born: East Hagbourne, Berkshire
- Died: 3 May 1407
- Denomination: Catholic

Richard Mitford (died 1407) was an English cleric and administrator. He was bishop of Chichester from 17 November 1389, consecrated on 10 April 1390, and then bishop of Salisbury. He was translated to the see of Salisbury on 25 October 1395.

== Early records ==
The earliest record of him is "Richard Medeford of Hakebourne, clerk" in 1349. The cartulary of Cirencester Abbey records the Metfords of Hakebourne (modern name East Hagbourne, Berkshire) as a leading freeman tenant family of the village. His name appears as "Metford" in his own household accounts and as "Medford" in the Register of John Chandler, who was Dean of Salisbury Cathedral during much of Mitford's episcopacy. Mitford, as revealed by bequests in his own and his brother Walter's wills, had three brothers and four sisters.

He spent much of his life at the royal court, starting probably as a chorister in the Chapel Royal and continuing as a clerk of the household under Edward III. His training during his time as a Fellow at Kings Hall, Cambridge from 1352 to 1374 prepared him for service in the royal bureaucracy, where he eventually rose to become Secretary of the King's Chamber to Richard II (1385 to 1388). He was a Canon of Windsor from 1375 to 1390.

Senior household members of Richard II were politically important, and his position gave Mitford considerable influence. He was one of the members of the royal household arrested by the "Lords Appellant" (Note: Mainly the magnates Gloucester, Arundel and Warwick, who were dissatisfied with the extravagant lifestyle of Richard II and the rewards he granted to his favorite courtiers. The lords led an armed revolt in 1387 which the king's troops were unable to quell, and persuaded Parliament to behead five of the king's Chamber knights.) in late 1387 for treason, and was imprisoned first in Bristol Castle and then in the Tower of London. However, he was eventually released without penalty.

From 1385 to 1390 he was Archdeacon of Norfolk. In 1389, Mitford was elected to be Bishop of St Davids but was rejected by the Pope.

While Bishop of Salisbury, Mitford spent much of his time at one or another of his episcopal manors, and by chance the household accounts survive of his stay at Potterne, near Devizes, for the last seven months of his life. These give day-by-day records of members of his household and his visitors, the amounts and prices of the food provided for everyday meals as well as the feasts given at Christmas, and even at his own funeral. Such details as his charitable gifts, the fee for his doctor and how much serecloth (Note: A coarse cloth wrapped round a corpse over which wax was poured to seal it.) was provided for his funeral are also included.

The figure of a bishop labelled with Mitford's name appears in the illustrations of the Sherborne Missal. He was a patron of Henry Chichele, who acted as lawyer for him.

== Appointments ==
A summary of his appointments is:

- Rector of Stoke Edith 1361
- Rector of Worlingworth 1361
- Rector of Sybeston 1371 (probably modern Sipson, Harmondsworth, Middlesex)
- Rector of Wittersham 1381
- Dean of the Chapel Royal
- Rector of St Magnus the Martyr, London Bridge
- Prebendary of Hastings 1384
- Prior of Holyhead 1384
- Dean of St Martin-le-Grand 1385–1389
- Archdeacon of Norfolk 1385
- Prebendary of Chichester 1385
- Prebendary of Wilton 1385
- Prebendary of Marsham in York 1386
- Prebendary of Wells 1386
- Bishop of Chichester 1390
- Bishop of Salisbury 1395

Mitford died on 3 May 1407, and was buried in the south transept of Salisbury Cathedral, where his tomb survives.

Catholic Church titles
Preceded by Thomas Rushock	Bishop of Chichester; 1389–1395	Succeeded by Robert Waldby
Preceded by John Waltham	Bishop of Salisbury; 1395–1407	Succeeded by Nicholas Bubwith
