= Fleet Street =

Street in London, England

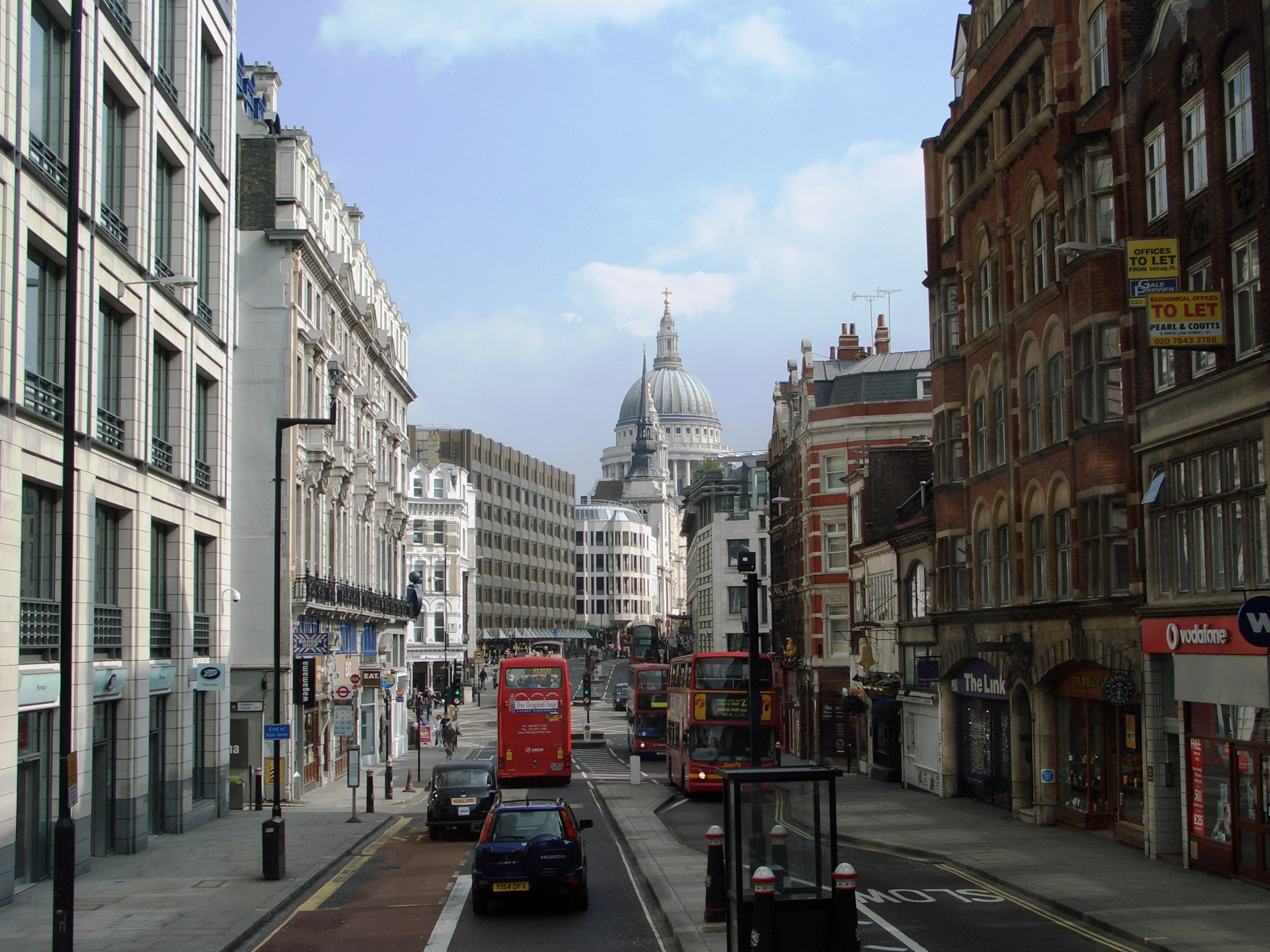
- Fleet Street in 2008

- Location within City of London
- Part of: A4
- Namesake: River Fleet
- Maintained by: Transport for London
- Length: 0.3 mi (0.48 km)
- Postal code: EC4
- Nearest train station: Blackfriars; City Thameslink
- Coordinates: 51.5138°N 0.1105°W

Fleet Street is a street in London, England. It runs west to east from Temple Bar at the boundary of the cities of London and Westminster to Ludgate Circus at the site of the London Wall and the River Fleet from which the street was named.

The street has been an important through route since Roman times. During the Middle Ages, businesses were established and senior clergy lived there; churches from this time include Temple Church and St Bride's. The street became known for printing and publishing at the start of the 16th century and by the 20th century, most British national newspapers operated here. Much of the industry moved out in the 1980s after News International set up cheaper manufacturing premises in Wapping. Some former newspaper sites are Listed buildings and have been preserved. The term Fleet Street is a metonym for the British national press, and pubs on the street once frequented by journalists are popular.

Monuments and statues along its length include the dragon at Temple Bar and memorials to a number of figures from the British press, such as Samuel Pepys and Lord Northcliffe. The street is mentioned in several works by Charles Dickens and is the home of the fictional murderer Sweeney Todd.

== Geography ==
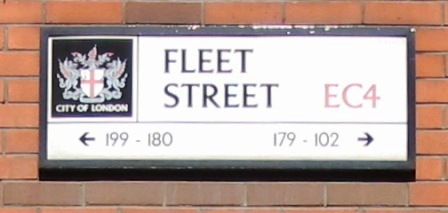
Fleet Street road sign. The street numbering runs consecutively from west to east south-side and then east to west north-side.

Fleet Street is named after the River Fleet, which runs from Hampstead to the River Thames at the western edge of the City of London. It is one of the oldest roads outside the original city and was established by the Middle Ages. In the 13th century, it was known as Fleet Bridge Street, and in the early 14th century it became known as Fleet Street.

The street runs east from Temple Bar, the boundary between the Cities of London and Westminster, as a continuation of the Strand from Trafalgar Square. It crosses Chancery Lane and Fetter Lane to reach Ludgate Circus by the London Wall. The road ahead is Ludgate Hill. The street numbering runs consecutively from west to east south-side and then east to west north-side. It links the Roman and medieval boundaries of the city after the latter was extended. The section of Fleet Street between Temple Bar and Fetter Lane is part of the A4, a major road running west through London, although it once ran along the entire street and eastwards past St Paul's Churchyard towards Cannon Street.

The nearest London Underground stations are Temple, Chancery Lane, and Blackfriars tube/mainline station and the City Thameslink railway station. London Bus routes 4, 11, 15, 23, 26, 76 and 172 run along the full length of Fleet Street, while route 341 runs between Temple Bar and Fetter Lane.

== History ==
=== Early history ===
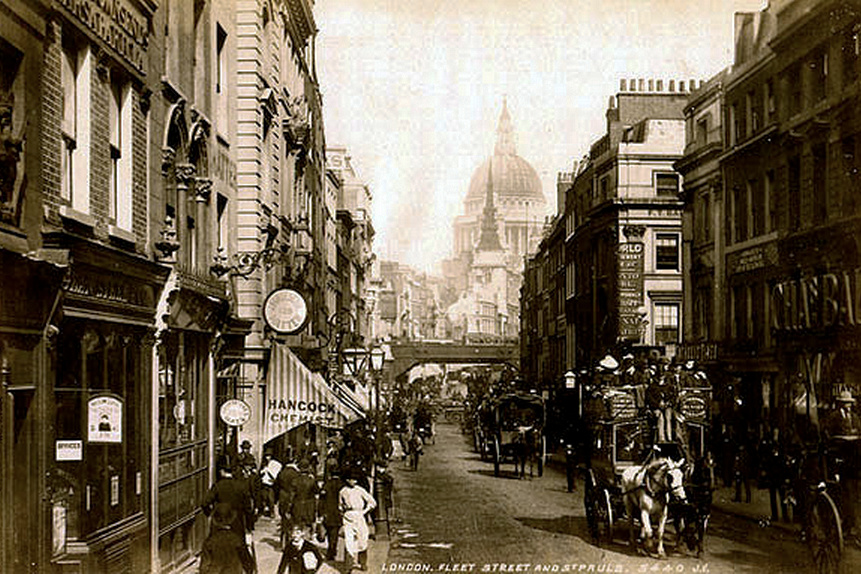
Fleet Street c. 1890

Fleet Street was established as a thoroughfare in Roman London and there is evidence that a route led west from Ludgate by 200 AD. Local excavations revealed remains of a Roman amphitheatre near Ludgate on what was Fleet Prison, but other accounts suggest the area was too marshy for regular inhabitation by the Romans. The Saxons did not occupy the Roman city but established Lundenwic further west around what is now Aldwych and the Strand.

Many prelates lived around the street during the Middle Ages, including the Bishops of Salisbury and St Davids and the Abbots of Faversham, Tewkesbury, Winchcombe and Cirencester. The 1392 Fleet Street riot took place around Salisbury Court, the Bishop of Salisbury's house.

Tanning of animal hides became established on Fleet Street owing to the nearby river, though this increased pollution leading to a ban on dumping rubbish by the mid-14th century. Many taverns and brothels were established along Fleet Street and have been documented as early as the 14th century; in 1339 a Fleet Street resident was found guilty of "harbouring prostitutes and sodomites". Records show that Geoffrey Chaucer was fined two shillings for attacking a friar in Fleet Street, though modern historians believe this is apocryphal.

An important landmark in Fleet Street during the late Middle Ages was a conduit that was the main water supply for the area. When Anne Boleyn was crowned queen following her marriage to Henry VIII in 1533, the conduit flowed wine instead of water. By the 16th century, Fleet Street, along with much of the city, was chronically overcrowded, and a royal proclamation in 1580 banned any further building on the street. This had little effect, and construction continued, particularly timber. Prince Henry's Room over the Inner Temple gate dates from 1610 and is named after Henry Frederick, Prince of Wales, eldest son of James I, who did not survive to succeed his father.

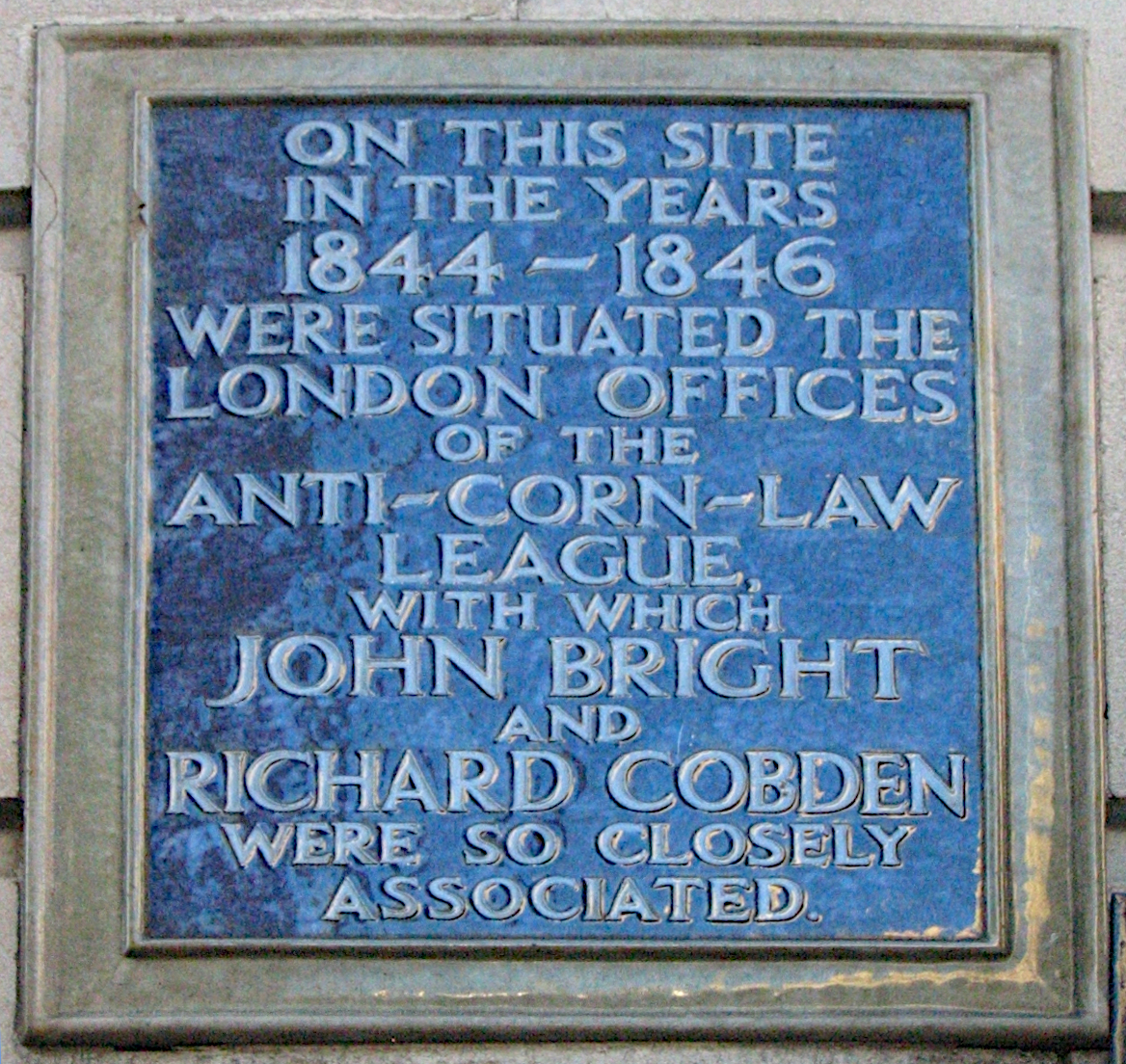
A blue plaque marking the location of the Anti-Corn Law League headquarters on No. 67 Fleet Street

The eastern part of the street was destroyed by the Great Fire of London in 1666, despite attempts to use the River Fleet to preserve it. Fire damage reached to about Fetter Lane, and the special tribunal of the 'Fire Courts' was held at Clifford's Inn, an inn of Chancery at the edge of the extent of the fire, to arbitrate on claimants' rights. Properties were rebuilt in the same style as before the fire.

During the early 18th century, a notorious upper-class gang known as the Mohocks operated on the street causing regular violence and vandalism. Mrs Salmon's Waxworks was established at Prince Henry's Room in 1711. It had a display of macabre and black-humoured exhibits, including the execution of Charles I; a Roman lady, Hermonie, whose father survived a sentence of starvation by sucking her breast; and a woman who gave birth to 365 children simultaneously. The waxworks were a favourite haunt of William Hogarth, and survived into the 19th century. The Apollo Society, a music club, was established in 1733 at the Devil Tavern on Fleet Street by composer Maurice Greene.

In 1763, supporters of John Wilkes, who had been arrested for libel against the Earl of Bute, burned a jackboot in the centre of the street in protest against Bute. It led to violent demonstrations and rioting in 1769 and 1794.

Tanning and other industries declined sharply after the River Fleet was routed underground in 1766. The street was widened during the late-19th century, when Temple Bar was demolished and Ludgate Circus was constructed. The headquarters of the Anti-Corn Law League were based at No. 67 Fleet Street, and a blue plaque marks the location.

=== Printing and journalism ===
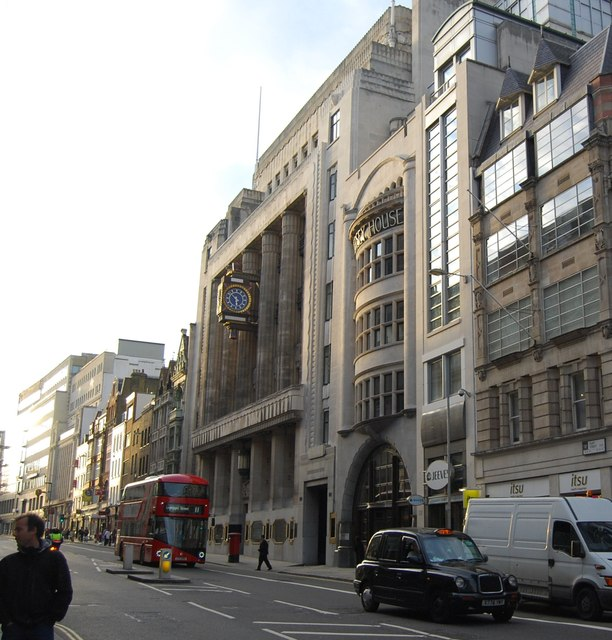
The former headquarters of The Daily Telegraph at No. 135–141

Publishing started in Fleet Street around 1500 when William Caxton's apprentice, Wynkyn de Worde, set up a printing shop near Shoe Lane, while at around the same time Richard Pynson set up as publisher and printer next to St Dunstan's Church. More printers and publishers followed, mainly supplying the legal trade in the four Inns of Court around the area, but also publishing books and plays.

In March 1702 the first issue of London's first daily newspaper, the Daily Courant, was published in Fleet Street. It was followed by the Morning Chronicle. The publisher John Murray was founded at No. 32 Fleet Street in 1762 and remained there until 1812, when it moved to Albemarle Street. The popularity of newspapers was restricted due to various taxes during the early 19th century, particularly paper duty. Peele's Coffee-House at No. 177–178 Fleet Street became popular and was the main committee room for the Society for Repealing the Paper Duty, starting in 1858. The society was successful and the duty was abolished in 1861. Along with the repeal of the newspaper tax in 1855, this led to a dramatic expansion of newspaper production in Fleet Street. The "penny press" (newspapers costing one penny) became popular during the 1880s and the initial number of titles had consolidated into a few nationally important ones.

By the 20th century, Fleet Street and the area surrounding it were dominated by the national press and related industries. The Daily Express relocated to No. 121–8 Fleet Street in 1931, into a building designed by Sir Owen Williams. It was the first curtain wall building in London. It has survived the departure of the newspaper in 1989 and was restored in 2001. The Daily Telegraph was based at No. 135–142. These premises are both Grade II-listed. In the 1930s, No. 67 housed 25 separate publications; by this time the majority of British households bought a daily paper produced from Fleet Street.

In the late 20th century new technology in printing and publishing and changes in labour practices led to the newspapers printing industry and journalists leaving Fleet Street. In 1986 News International owner Rupert Murdoch caused controversy when he moved publication of The Times and The Sun away from Fleet Street to new premises in Wapping, East London. Murdoch believed it was impossible to produce a newspaper profitably on Fleet Street and the power of the print unions, the National Graphical Association (NGA) and the Society of Graphical and Allied Trades (SOGAT), was too strong (an opinion endorsed by the Prime Minister, Margaret Thatcher). All Fleet Street print staff were sacked and new staff from the Electrical, Electronic, Telecommunications and Plumbing Union were brought in to operate the presses at Wapping using modern computer-operated technology, rendering the power of the old unions obsolete. The resulting Wapping dispute featured violent protests at Fleet Street and Wapping that lasted over a year, but ultimately other publishers followed suit and moved out of Fleet Street towards Canary Wharf or Southwark. Reuters, based at No. 85, was the last major news outlet to leave Fleet Street, in 2005. In the same year, The Daily Telegraph and Sunday Telegraph announced they were returning to the centre of London from Canary Wharf to new premises in Victoria in 2006.

Some publishers have remained on Fleet Street. The London office of D.C. Thomson & Co., creator of The Beano, is at No. 185. The Secretariat of the Commonwealth Broadcasting Association is at No. 17, as is Wentworth Publishing, an independent publisher of newsletters and courses. The Associated Press has an office in Fleet Street, as did The Jewish Chronicle until 2013, when it moved to Golders Green. The British Association of Journalists is based at No. 89 while Metro International are at No. 85.

Though many prominent national newspapers have moved away from Fleet Street, the name is still synonymous with the printing and publishing industry. In the adjacent St. Brides Lane is the St Bride Library, holding a specialist collection relating to the type and print industry and providing courses in printing technology and methods. On the wall of Magpie Alley, off Bouverie Street, is a mural depicting the history of newspapers in the area.

The Daily Express was the last newspaper to be printed on Fleet Street on 17 November 1989, in their former premises at 120 Fleet Street. The last two journalists to work for the Dundee-based Sunday Post, left in 2016, as the paper closed its London offices.

=== Modern history ===
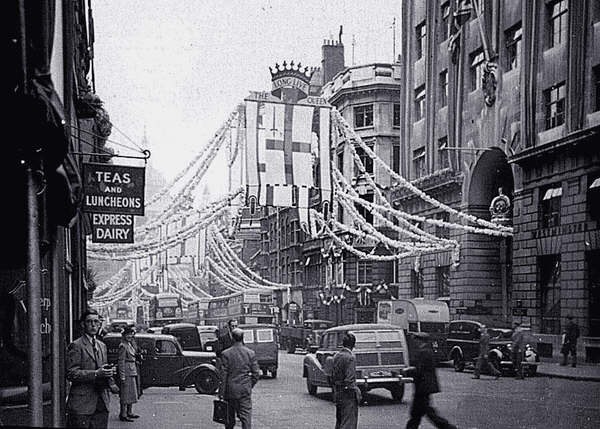
Fleet Street pictured in 1953, with flags hung for the coronation of Queen Elizabeth II

Despite the domination of the print industry, other businesses were also established on Fleet Street. The Automobile Association was established at No. 18 Fleet Street in 1905. Since the post-Wapping migration, Fleet Street is now more associated with the investment banking, legal and accountancy professions. For example, The Inns of Court and barristers' chambers are down alleys and around courtyards off Fleet Street itself and many of the old newspaper offices have become the London headquarters for various companies. One example is Goldman Sachs, whose offices are in the old Daily Telegraph and Liverpool Echo buildings of Peterborough Court and Mersey House.

C. Hoare & Co, England's oldest privately owned bank, has been operating in Fleet Street since 1672. Child & Co., now a wholly owned subsidiary of Royal Bank of Scotland, claims it is the oldest continuous banking establishment in the United Kingdom. It was founded in 1580 and has been based at No.1 Fleet Street, adjacent to Temple Bar, since 1673. The law firm Freshfields moved to No. 65 Fleet Street in 1990.

== Notable buildings ==
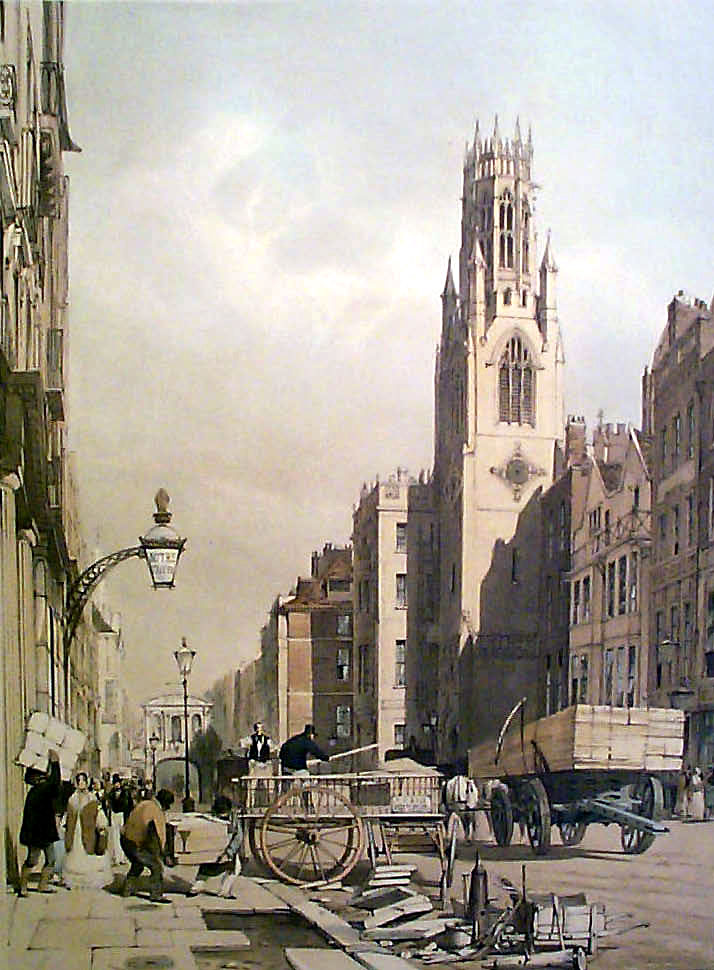
St-Dunstan-in-the-West on Fleet Street, pictured in 1842

In the High Middle Ages senior clergymen had their London palaces in the street. Place-names surviving with this connection are Peterborough Court and Salisbury Court after their respective Bishops' houses here; apart from the Knights Templars' establishment the Whitefriars monastery is recalled by Whitefriars Street and the remains of its undercroft have been preserved in a public display area. A Carmelite church was established on Fleet Street in 1253, but it was destroyed during the Reformation in 1545.

Today three churches serve the spiritual needs of the three 'communities' associated with the area of the street. Temple Church was built by the Knights Templar in 1162 and serves the legal profession. St Bride's Church was established as early as the 6th century and was later designed by Sir Christopher Wren in a style that complemented St Mary Le Bow further east in the city. It remains the London church most associated with the print industry. St Dunstan-in-the-West also dates from the 12th century supplements these as the local parish (as opposed to guild church) and is the London home for the Romanian Orthodox church.

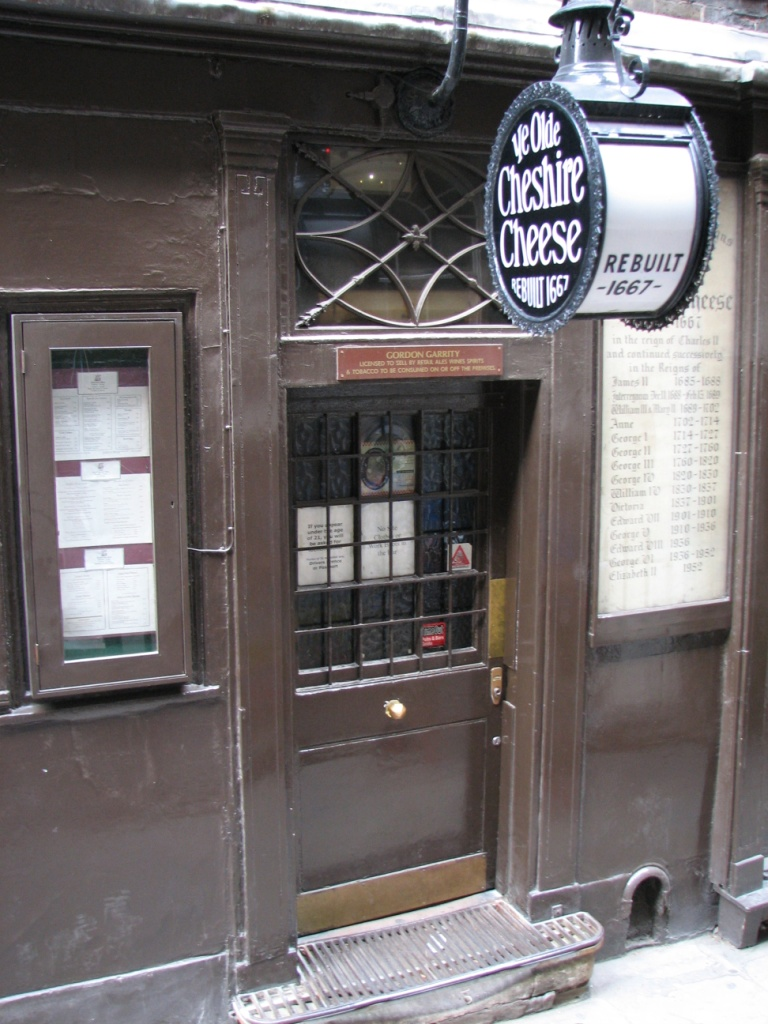
Ye Olde Cheshire Cheese

To the south lies an area of legal buildings known as the Temple, formerly the property of the Knights Templar, which at its core includes two of the four Inns of Court: the Inner Temple and the Middle Temple. There are many lawyers' offices (especially barristers' chambers) in the vicinity. The gatehouse to Middle Temple Lane was built by Sir Christopher Wren in 1684. To the west, at the junction with Strand are the Royal Courts of Justice whilst at the eastern end of the street the Old Bailey is near Ludgate Circus.

As a principal route leading to and from the city, Fleet Street was especially noted for its taverns and coffeehouses. Many notable persons of literary and political fame such as Samuel Johnson frequented these, and journalists would regularly meet in pubs to collect stories. Some have survived to the 21st century and are grade II listed: Ye Olde Cock Tavern at No. 22, The Tipperary at No. 66, the Old Bell at No. 95, the Punch Tavern at No. 98 and Ye Olde Cheshire Cheese at No. 145. The El Vino wine bar moved to No. 47 in 1923, quickly becoming popular with lawyers and journalists. Women were not allowed in the bar until 1982, and then only because of a court order. The Old Bank of England, which from 1888 to 1975 was a trading house for the country's central bank, is now a Grade II listed pub.

Since 1971, the southern side of the street has been part of the Fleet Street Conservation Area, which ensures buildings are regularly maintained and the character of the street is preserved. The area expanded to the north side in 1981.

== Monuments and statues ==
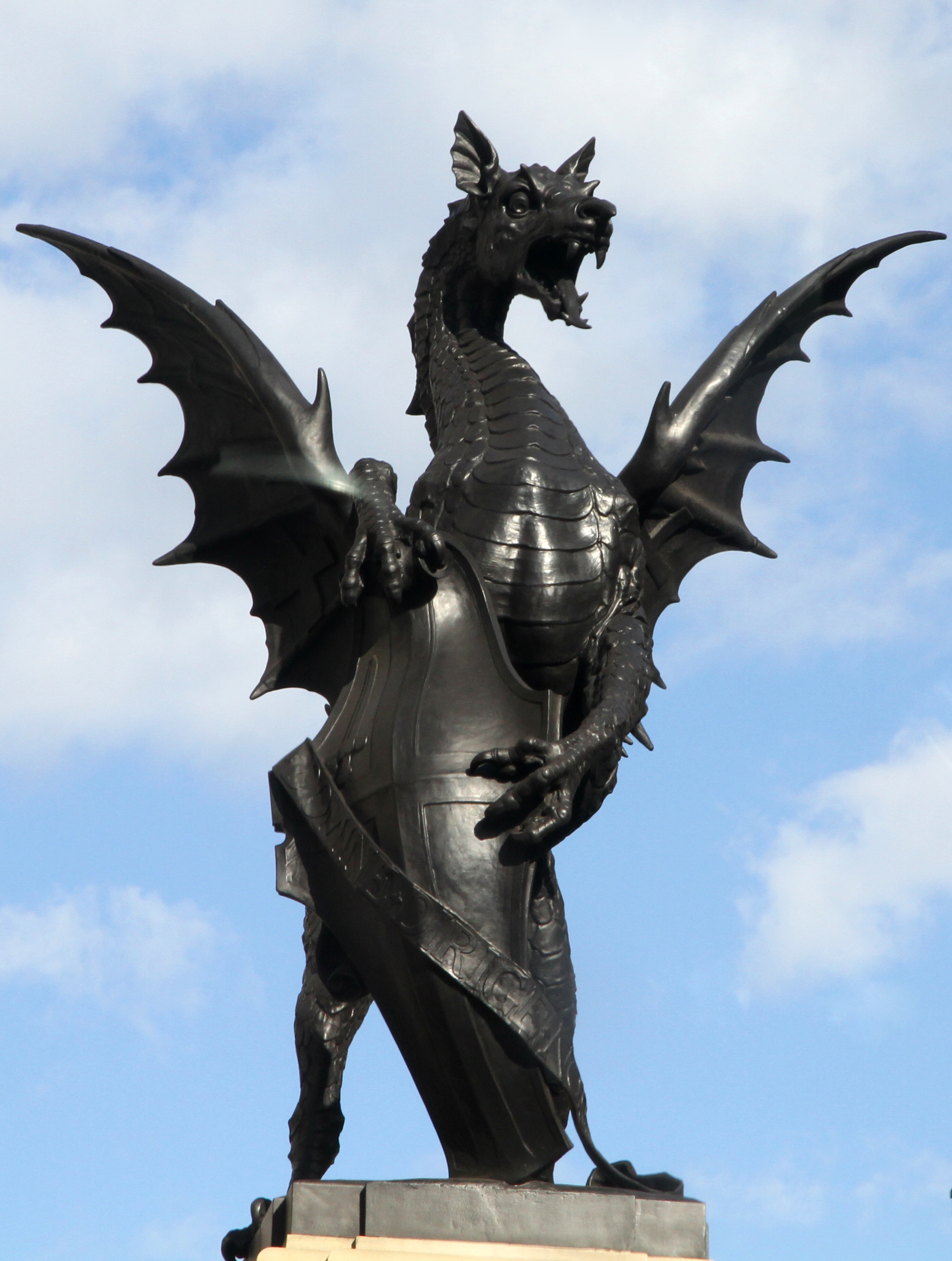
The Temple Bar Memorial, one of the boundary markers of the City of London

The area around Fleet Street contains numerous statues and memorials to prominent public figures. At the north-eastern corner is a bust of Edgar Wallace, and a full-length representation of Mary, Queen of Scots in a first-floor niche at No. 143–144 commissioned by John Tollemache Sinclair. Above the entrance to the old school-house of St Dunstan's is a statue of Queen Elizabeth I provided for the then new Ludgate in 1586 by William Kerwin; it was moved to here following the gate's demolition in 1776. Adjacent to this is a bust of Lord Northcliffe, the newspaper proprietor, co-founder of the Daily Mail and the Daily Mirror. At No. 72 is a bust of the Irish journalist and MP T. P. O'Connor, constructed in 1934 by F. W. Doyle-Jones.

On the southern side of the street nearby memorials and monuments include the Temple Bar Memorial where the Temple Bar (a gateway) used to stand until it was removed in 1878. The marker was designed by Sir Horace Jones in 1880. It has a statue of a dragon at the top (sometimes called "the Griffin"), and a statue of Queen Victoria in a niche in the side.

In the Inner Temple Gardens is a memorial to Charles Lamb. In Salisbury Square there is an obelisk commemorating Robert Waithman, mayor of London between 1823 and 1833, and a blue plaque commemorating the birthplace of diarist and naval secretary Samuel Pepys.

== Notable residents ==
Several writers and politicians are associated with Fleet Street, either as residents or regulars to the various taverns, including Ben Jonson, John Milton, Izaak Walton, John Dryden, Edmund Burke, Oliver Goldsmith and Charles Lamb. Wynkyn de Worde was buried in St. Bride's Church in 1535, as was poet Richard Lovelace in 1657, while Samuel Pepys was baptised there in 1633. The lexicographer Samuel Johnson lived at Gough Square off Fleet Street between 1748 and 1759; the building has survived into the 21st century. The cartographer John Senex owned a map store, The Sign of the Globe, on Fleet Street between 1725 and his death in 1736.

The Royal Society was based in Crane Court from 1710 to 1782, when it moved to Somerset House on the Strand.

== Cultural references ==
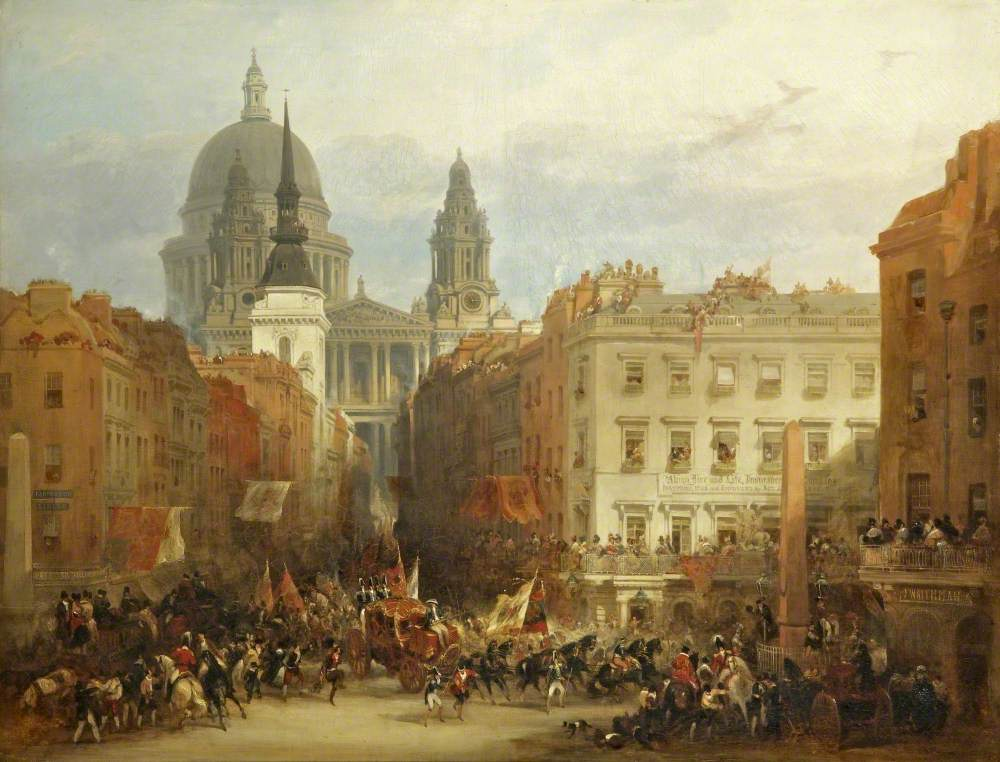
London from Fleet Street by David Roberts, 1837

The barber Sweeney Todd is traditionally said to have lived and worked during the 18th century in Fleet Street, where he would murder customers and serve their remains as pie fillings. An urban myth example of a serial killer, the character appears in various English language works starting in the mid-19th century. Adaptations of the story include the 1936 George King film, the 1979 Stephen Sondheim musical, and the 2007 Tim Burton film based on the musical, all titled Sweeney Todd: The Demon Barber of Fleet Street.

Fleet Street is mentioned in several of Charles Dickens's works. The eponymous club in The Posthumous Papers of the Pickwick Club, more commonly known as The Pickwick Papers, is set in the street, as is Tellson's Bank in A Tale of Two Cities. The poet John Davidson wrote two works in the late 19th century titled the Fleet Street Eclogues. Arthur Ransome has a chapter in his Bohemia in London (1907) about earlier inhabitants of the street: Ben Jonson, the lexicographer Doctor Samuel Johnson, Coleridge, Hazlitt and Lamb; and about Temple Bar and the Press Club.

Fleet Street is a square on the British Monopoly board, in a group with the Strand and Trafalgar Square. One of the Chance cards in the game, "You Have Won A Crossword Competition, collect £100" was inspired by rival competitions and promotions between Fleet Street-based newspapers in 1930s, particularly the Daily Mail and Daily Express. (Note: In 1931, the Daily Mail paid £125,000 (now £7,362,000) in crossword prizes.)

== See also ==
- The Printworks, Fleet Street of the North
- Holborn, with a description of the surrounding area
- Bahadur Shah Zafar Marg in Delhi, known as the Fleet Street of India
- Paternoster Row

== Citations ==
- Bellot, Hugh Hale Leigh (1902). The Inner and Middle Temple: Legal, Literary, and Historic Associations. Methuen & Co.
- Brooke, Alan (2010). Fleet Street: The Story of a Street. Amberley Publishing. ISBN 978-1-4456-1138-9.
- Castor, Helen (2024). The Eagle and the Hart: The Tragedy of Richard II and Henry IV.
- Hampton, Mark (2004). Visions of the Press in Britain, 1850–1950. University of Illinois Press. ISBN 978-0-252-02946-2.
- Moore, Tim (2003). Do Not Pass Go. Vintage. ISBN 978-0-09-943386-6.
- Weinreb, Ben; Hibbert, Christopher; Keay, Julia; Keay, John (2008). The London Encyclopaedia. Pan MacMillan. ISBN 978-1-4050-4924-5.
- Fleet Street Conservation Area Character Study (PDF) (Report). Corporation of London. 1996. Archived from the original (PDF) on 4 March 2016.
