= Old Bell, Fleet Street =

Pub in the City of London

Coordinates: 51.514070°N 0.105270°W

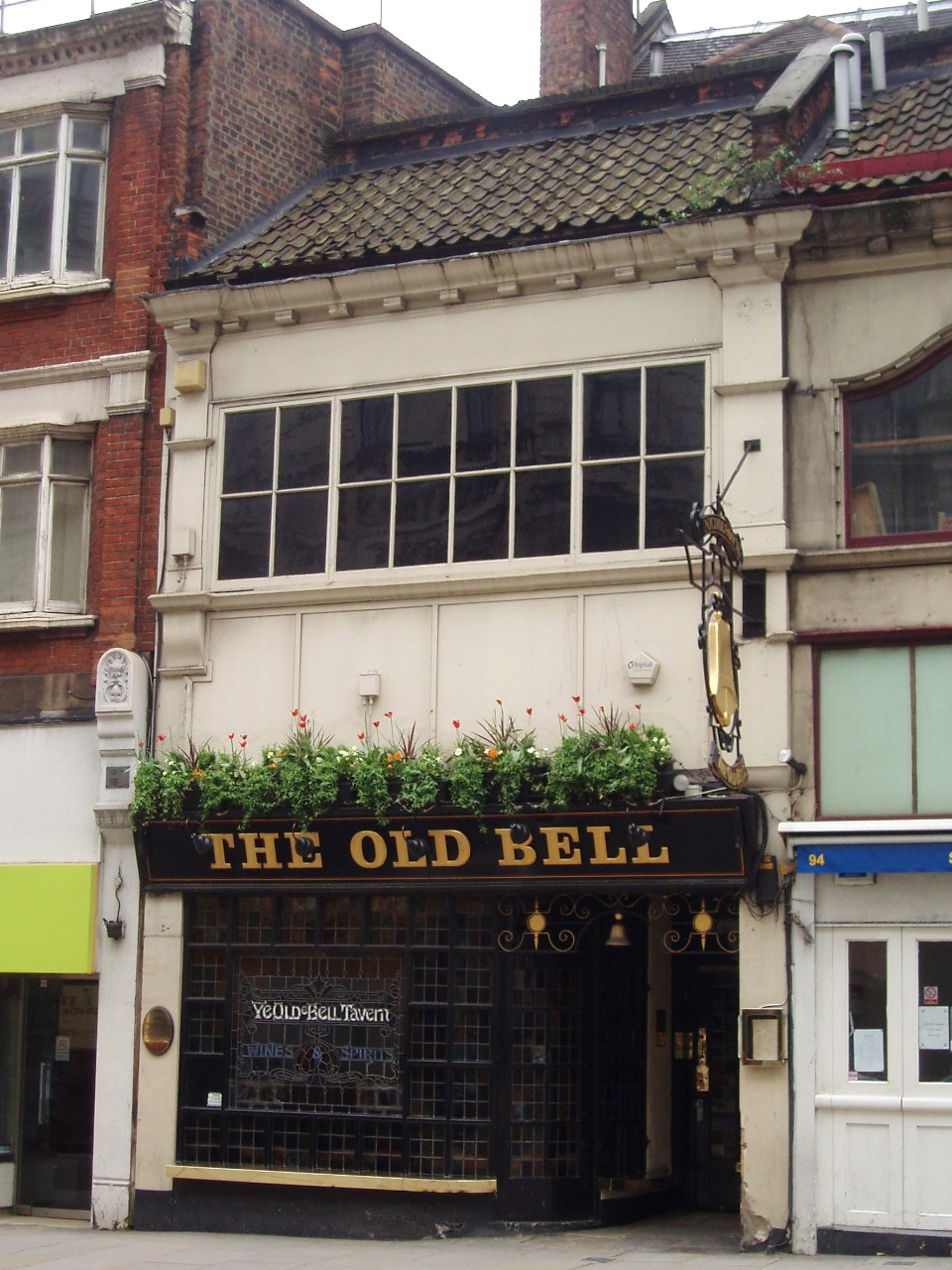
Old Bell, Fleet Street, 2008

The Old Bell is a pub at 95 Fleet Street, London EC4.

It is a Grade II listed building, dating back to the 17th century.

It is claimed that it was built by Christopher Wren for the use of his masons.
