= Sherborne Missal =

15th-century illuminated manuscript

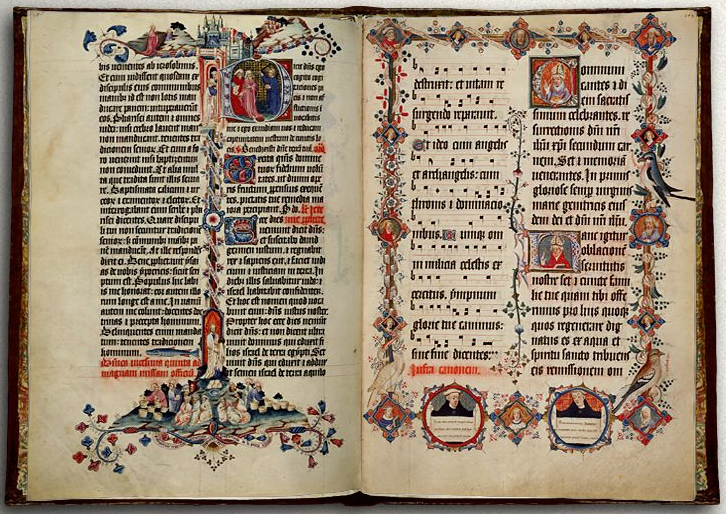
Page 356 of the Sherborne Missal depicting the Feeding of the Five Thousand, and page 367 with careful depictions of birds and portraits of the bishops of Sherborne.

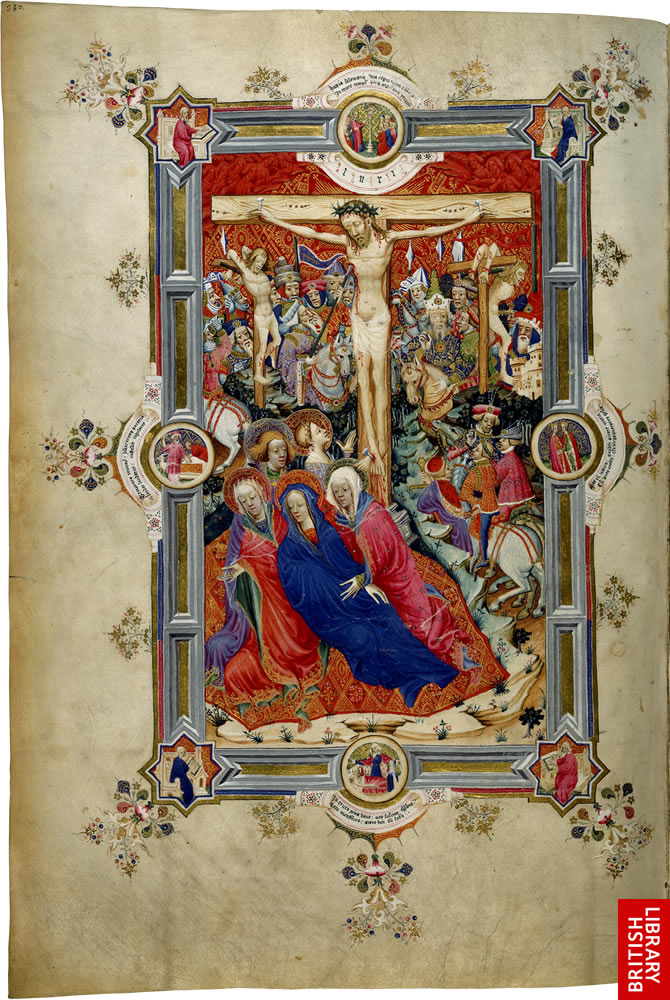
Page 380 showing the Crucifixion, the only full-page miniature in the missal. The following page was intentionally left blank.

The Sherborne Missal (London, British Library, Add MS 74236) is an early 15th-century English illuminated manuscript missal, one of the finest English examples of International Gothic painting. With 347 vellum leaves measuring 535 by 380 millimetres (21.1 in × 15.0 in), it weighs 20 kg. It has survived in excellent condition, and is usually on display at the Ritblat Gallery in the British Library. It has been described as "beyond question the most spectacular service book of English execution to have come down to us from the later Middle Ages."

The Sherborne Missal was commissioned by Robert Bruyning, who served as abbot at the Abbey of St Mary in Sherborne in Dorset from 1385 to 1415. It was made for use at the abbey sometime between 1399 and 1407. The main scribe was a Benedictine monk of Sherborne Abbey, John Whas. Several hands worked on the illumination but the main artist was John Siferwas, a Dominican friar. Both of them, alongside Bruyning and his superior the Bishop of Salisbury Richard Mitford, are depicted and named in numerous miniatures.

The marginal decorations contain numerous high-quality drawings of British birds, including cormorants, gannets, moorhens, storks, European robins, chaffinches and mallards. According to William Brunsdon Yapp, it depicts the greatest number of identifiable bird species (40) of any medieval manuscript. Over a hundred leaves portray Bruyning. Saint Wulfsige is also depicted, welcoming Benedictine monks into the chapel, marking the 998 move of the bishop's see from Sherborne to Salisbury via Old Sarum. Given that the scribes were thus aware of the church's history, it is likely that the missal was commissioned to commemorate Bruyning's career, but also to promote the building's history, and reinforce the public image of the church in general. Bruyning was most likely motivated by a desire to enhance Sherborne's reputation in a bid to attain funds for construction. In particular he wanted to rebuild the monks' choir; more generally he wanted to modernise what was then a largely 12th-century building. Surviving records indicate that Bruyning undertook this task with vigour.

In 1998 the Sherborne Missal was bought by the British Library from Ralph Percy, 12th Duke of Northumberland.

== See also ==
- List of most expensive books and manuscripts
