= Daily Telegraph Building =

Coordinates: 51°30′51.6″N 0°6′24.48″W

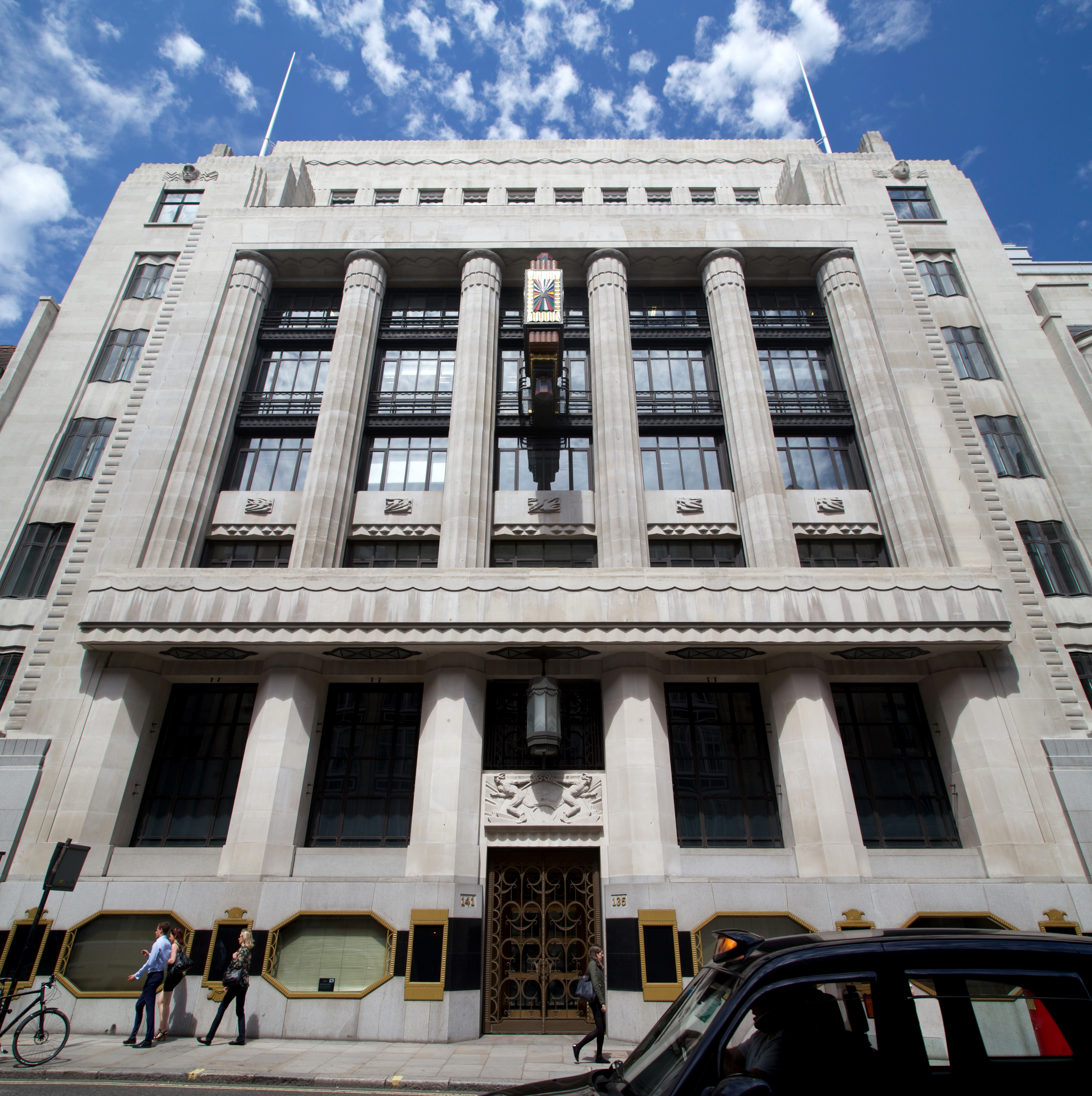
Daily Telegraph Building

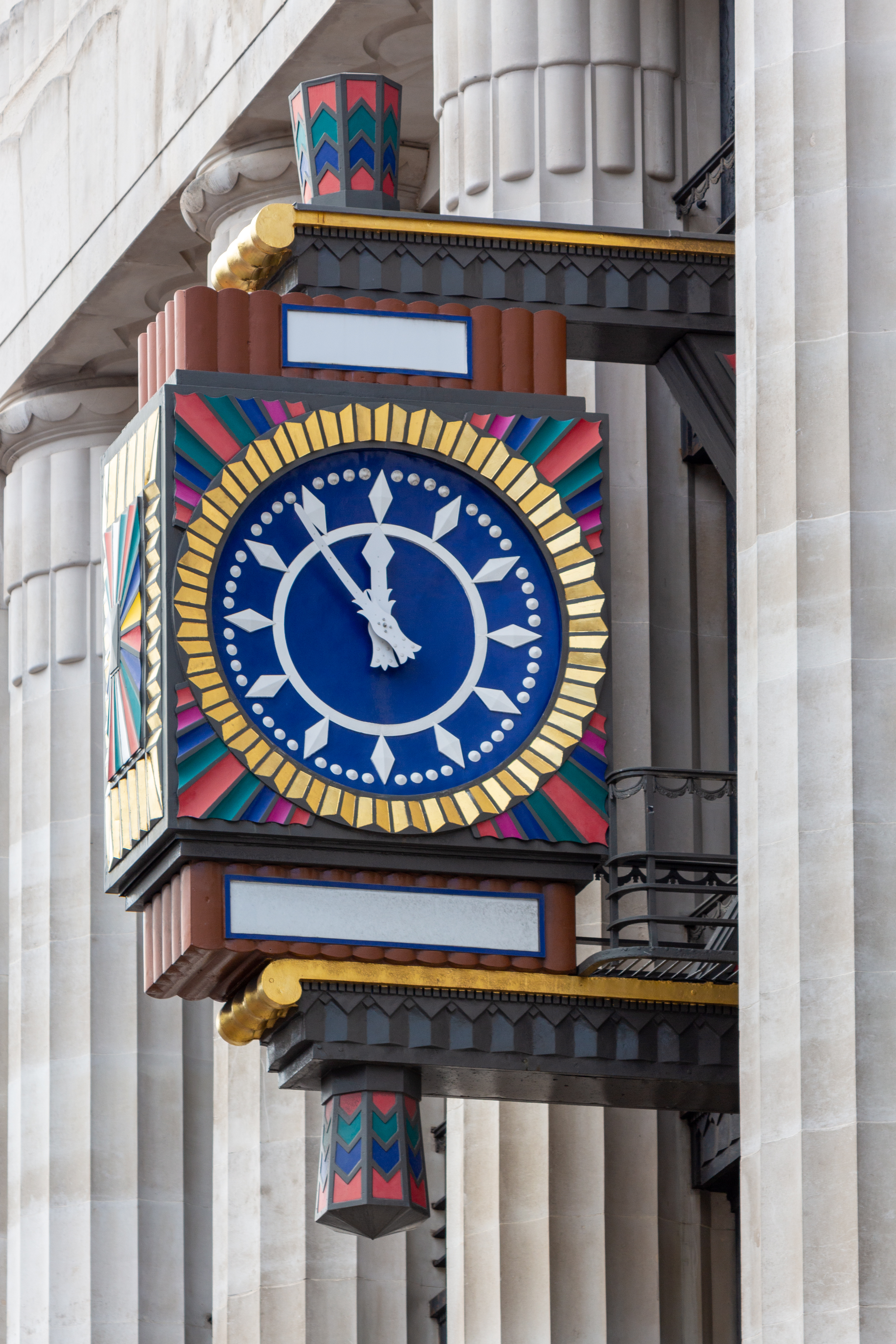
The building's clock

The Daily Telegraph Building, also known as Peterborough Court, is an Art Deco office building with Egyptian decorations and a monumental colonnade façade, located at 135–141 Fleet Street, London.

The building was designed by Charles Ernest Elcock, after consulting with Thomas S. Tait, and opened in 1928. The building is eight storeys tall and seven windows wide, and made of Portland stone. There is a large clock hanging above the street level. The building has been Grade II listed since 1983.

It was originally the head office of the British newspaper The Daily Telegraph, before the company moved out in the 1980s following the Wapping dispute. The newspaper's diary column was named "Peterborough" after the building until 2003. The "Peterborough" diary name was revived in 2021 . From 1991 to 2019 Peterborough Court was the European headquarters of the investment bank Goldman Sachs. In 2021 the building's owners, members of the Qatari royal family, announced plans to spend £90 million redeveloping the building.
