= Thomas Rushhook =

14th-century Bishop of Chichester, Bishop of Llandaff, and Bishop of Kilmore

- Bishop of Breifne (Kilmore)
- In office: c. 1388–c. 1392
- Predecessor: John
- Successor: Sean o Raighilligh
- Previous posts: Bishop of Llandaff; Bishop of Chichester; Archdeacon of St. Asaph

Personal details
- Died: c. 1392 Ireland
- Denomination: Catholic

Thomas Rushhook (Note: Also known as Thomas Rushook, Thomas Rushock, Thomas Rushooke, Thomas Russhock or Thomas Vichor) (died c. 1392) was an English Dominican, bishop and chaplain to Richard II of England.

Rushhook was Provincial of the Dominican Order in England 1373 to 1382, being deposed at one point. He was Archdeacon of St Asaph 1382–3, bishop of Llandaff on 16 January 1383, and then was translated to be bishop of Chichester on 16 October 1385.

A supporter of Richard II, Rushhook was impeached in 1388. Subsequently, he was in Ireland, as bishop of Breifne (Kilmore), where he died about 1392.

== Citations ==
Catholic Church titles
Preceded by Rodger Cradock	Bishop of Llandaff; 1383–1385	Succeeded by William of Bottesham
Preceded by William Reade	Bishop of Chichester; 1385–1388	Succeeded by Richard Mitford
Preceded by John	Bishop of Breifne (Kilmore) c. 1388 – c. 1392	Succeeded by Sean o Raighilligh
