= John Hende =

English merchant and Lord Mayor of London

John Hende (ca. 1350–12 August 1418) was an English merchant and politician who served twice as Lord Mayor of London. He was imprisoned on the orders of King Richard II, before later becoming a leading financier of the reign of King Henry IV after Richard's overthrow.

== Career ==
Hende is recorded to have been a member of the Drapers' Company from 1367. By 1379, Hende was one of London's aldermen, and he served as sheriff in 1381-2. He was involved in a dispute over lands in Essex in 1381; the poet Geoffrey Chaucer served as one of his sureties in this dispute.

Hende was elected mayor of London in 1391. His first term was tumultuous, with the king curtailing some of the city's traditional liberties. In late 1391 and early 1392, the king and city argued over the right to claim vessels or goods in the Thames near London as deodand. Then in January 1392, the king was angered by Hende's insistence, in his role as mayor, that no Londoner could be arrested without the assent of the mayor or his officers. Hende, along with other London officials, was summoned to the royal council for eight days, although it is not recorded what the result of these discussions was. On June 25, after a riot in Fleet Street, Hende and several other leading Londoners were summoned to Nottingham Castle; the sheriffs and Hende himself were removed from their offices and imprisoned, while Edward Dalyngrigge was appointed as Royal Warden of the city. The next month Hende was summoned to a hearing, with many other former officials, and fined, before being released on bail on 22 July.

Perhaps surprisingly, given the events of his first term as mayor, Hende earned substantial profits from royal spending later in Richard's reign. Hende, along with the future mayor Richard Whittington, was one of the most prominent suppliers to the royal wardrobe from 1392 to 1394. He lent large amounts of money to both Henry IV and Henry V. He was elected to a second term as mayor in 1405.

== Personal life ==
Hende was lord of the manor of Stondon in Stondon Massey. He also held manors or lands in Wrabness, Little Canfield, Little Chishall, Bradwell, Pycotes, Bocking, Cressing, and Pattiswick.

Hende married twice. He first married Katharine Baynarde, a widow, in about 1380. After her death, he married again, this time to a daughter of John Norbury, the Lord High Treasurer of England. His second wife, Elizabeth Norbury, was about fifteen at the time of the marriage, while Hende was about fifty-eight. They had two sons, in 1409 and in 1412, both named John. Both of his sons later served as High Sheriff of Essex, John "the Elder" in 1443 and 1447 and John "the Younger" in 1456. One of Hende's sons-in-law, Walter Wrytell, held the same office in 1469. Hende was the stepfather (via his first marriage) of Richard Baynard, Speaker of the House of Commons of England in 1421, and seems to have used his connections to his stepson's advantage.

Hende died on 12 August 1418. He was buried at Bradwell in Essex. His widow, Elizabeth Norbury, married Ralph Boteler, 1st Baron Sudeley.

== Sources ==
- Barron, Caroline; Carlin, Martha; Rosenthal, Joel T. (2017). "Medieval London: Collected Papers of Caroline M. Barron" (PDF). Research in Medieval and Early Modern Culture (9).
