= Florentine–Milanese Wars =

1390–1402 series of wars

The Florentine–Milanese Wars or Visconti Wars were three connected conflicts from 1390 to 1402 between the Republic of Florence and her allies against the expansionist designs of the Lordship (from 1395 Duchy) of Milan under Gian Galeazzo Visconti. The wars involved most of the states of northern Italy, as well as foreign powers, as the rivals sought support in Germany and France. The first two conflicts were largely inconclusive, while Florence could count on an alliance network to contain Visconti. As the Florence's alliances collapsed during the late 1390s, the city was left exposed. Defeated during the third war, Florence was saved from conquest only by the sudden death of Visconti from the plague, after which his extensive territorial state rapidly collapsed.

== Background ==
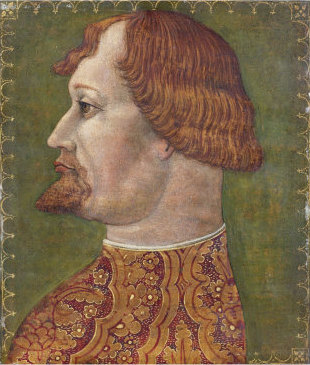
Portrait of Gian Galeazzo Visconti

After assassinating his uncle and father-in-law Bernabò Visconti in 1385, the lord of Pavia, Gian Galeazzo Visconti, became ruler of Milan, and in a short period of time established an extensive territorial state in northern Italy, aiming to claim the title of king of Lombardy and Tuscany. He gained the backing of Pope Urban IV and concluded an alliance with the Republic of Venice, which in 1387 allowed him to conquer the cities of Verona and Vicenza, putting an end to the Scaliger lordship there. Vicenza had been promised to Padua, but Visconti kept it for himself. In 1388, with Venetian support, Visconti attacked Padua as well, forcing its lord, Francesco Novello da Carrara, to capitulate and surrender all is domains in northern Italy—Padua itself, Treviso, Ceneda, Feltre, and Belluno—to the lord of Milan.

The rapid expansion of the Viscontean state worried the Republic of Florence. When mercenary bands formerly in the Milanese lord's employ had raided into Tuscany in 1387, the Republic suspected them to be acting on Visconti's behalf, and the latter's attack on Padua only served to confirm suspicions of his ultimate designs. Florence began a military build-up, hiring the mercenary commander John Hawkwood, and cautiously supported the Carrara: along with Bologna, Florence tried to mediate on their behalf with the Milanese–Venetian alliance. Soon, Florence and its environs became a haven for the anti-Visconti opposition: Bernabò Visconti's son Carlo and Antonio I della Scala, the former lord of Verona, as well as Francesco Novello and his family. Francesco Novello joined the Florentine and Bolognese efforts to find support against Visconti among the German princes who had married Bernabò's numerous daughters, especially the Dukes of Bavaria. Florence also made common cause with Bologna, also a target of Visconti's ambitions.

== Prelude ==
War was inevitable, but neither side wanted to be seen to be the aggressor, lest the still uncommitted cities throw in their lot with the other side. At the same time, tensions mounted with Florence's neighbour, Siena, worried by the large mercenary army being assembled on its frontier, despite patently disingenuous Florentine denials that they had anything to do with it; constant skirmishes and frictions with Siena ensued, moving the latter into the Visconti camp, until, on 22 September 1389, Siena concluded a ten-year alliance with Milan. At the same time, Florence and Bologna tried to secure a nonaggression treaty with Gian Galeazzo; through the mediation of Pietro Gambacorta, lord of Pisa, an agreement was reached on 9 October 1389, demarcating the Milanese from the Florentine zones of influence in Italy, but it merely delayed the inevitable drift to war. Already on the very next day, Florence, Bologna, Pisa, Lucca, and Perugia signed a defensive alliance directed against Visconti expansionism in Tuscany. Shortly after Visconti expelled all Florentine and Bolognese citizens from Milan, and a Visconti plot to overthrow the government of Bologna was discovered.

== First War (1390–1392) ==
During the first war the Florentines, employing the mercenary commander John Hawkwood, managed to recover Padua and secure the defection of Ferrara, but their offensive against Milan failed and only the skill of Hawkwood managed to extricate the exposed Florentine army from disaster. With both sides exhausted, a peace was concluded on 20 January 1392 that essentially confirmed the status quo ante, with the exception of Paduan independence.

After the war, Florence managed to establish an extensive anti-Visconti alliance in the League of Bologna, while Visconti sought French support by marrying his daughter Valentina Visconti to Louis I, Duke of Orléans, and conceded French claims to Genoa and Savona. He also engaged in a reorganization and centralization of the Milanese state, and gained for himself Imperial recognition by Wenceslaus of Luxembourg as Duke of Milan, followed by the countships of Pavia and Angera.

== Second or Mantuan War (1397–1398) ==
Expansion of the Visconti domains up to 1402

Over the following years, the pro-war faction led by Maso degli Albizzi and Rinaldo Gianfigliazzi won the upper hand in Florence, even exiling the more moderate leaders, leading to the resumption of hostilities in March 1397. The war began when Visconti troops under Ugolotto Biancardo invaded Mantuan territory. Florence and her allies mobilized their troops under the command of Carlo Malatesta, and even received naval support from Venice. The Milanese were defeated outside Mantua in late August, but the war again proved extremely costly and indecisive, with peace restored in the ten-year Truce of Pavia on 11 May 1398.

== Third War (1400–1402) ==
In the aftermath of the Second War, Visconti was able to subdue Pisa, Siena, Grosseto, Perugia, Cortona, Chiusi, Spoleto and Assisi, depriving Florence of most of her allies. With the departure of Lucca from the League of Bologna in late 1400, only Florence and Bologna were left to oppose the Duke of Milan. Florence sought the support of Rupert of the Palatinate, a rival of Wenceslaus of Luxembourg and hence of Visconti but Rupert's campaign in Italy ended in a disastrous defeat at the hands of the Milanese near Brescia. The Milanese army defeated the Florentines on 26 June 1402 at the Battle of Casalecchio, followed by the fall of Bologna four days later. Florence prepared for invasion and siege but the death of Visconti on 3 September 1402, of the plague or another illness, saved the city and heralded the end of the war.

== Bibliography ==
- Caferro, William (2006). John Hawkwood: An English Mercenary in Fourteenth-Century Italy. Baltimore: The Johns Hopkins University Press. ISBN 0-8018-8323-7.
- Kohl, Benjamin G. (1998). Padua under the Carrara, 1318–1405. Baltimore and London: Johns Hopkins University Press. ISBN 0-8018-5703-1.
- Najemy, John M. (2006). A History of Florence 1200–1575. Oxford: Blackwell Publishing. ISBN 978-1-4051-1954-2.
- Vaglienti, F. M. (1997). "Visconti, Gian Galeazzo". Lexikon des Mittelalters, VIII: Stadt (Byzantinisches Reich) bis Werl (in German). Stuttgart and Weimar: J. B. Metzler. col. 1723–1724. ISBN 3-89659-908-9.
