= Salisbury Square =

Urban square in London, England

Coordinates: 51.5135°N 0.1063°W

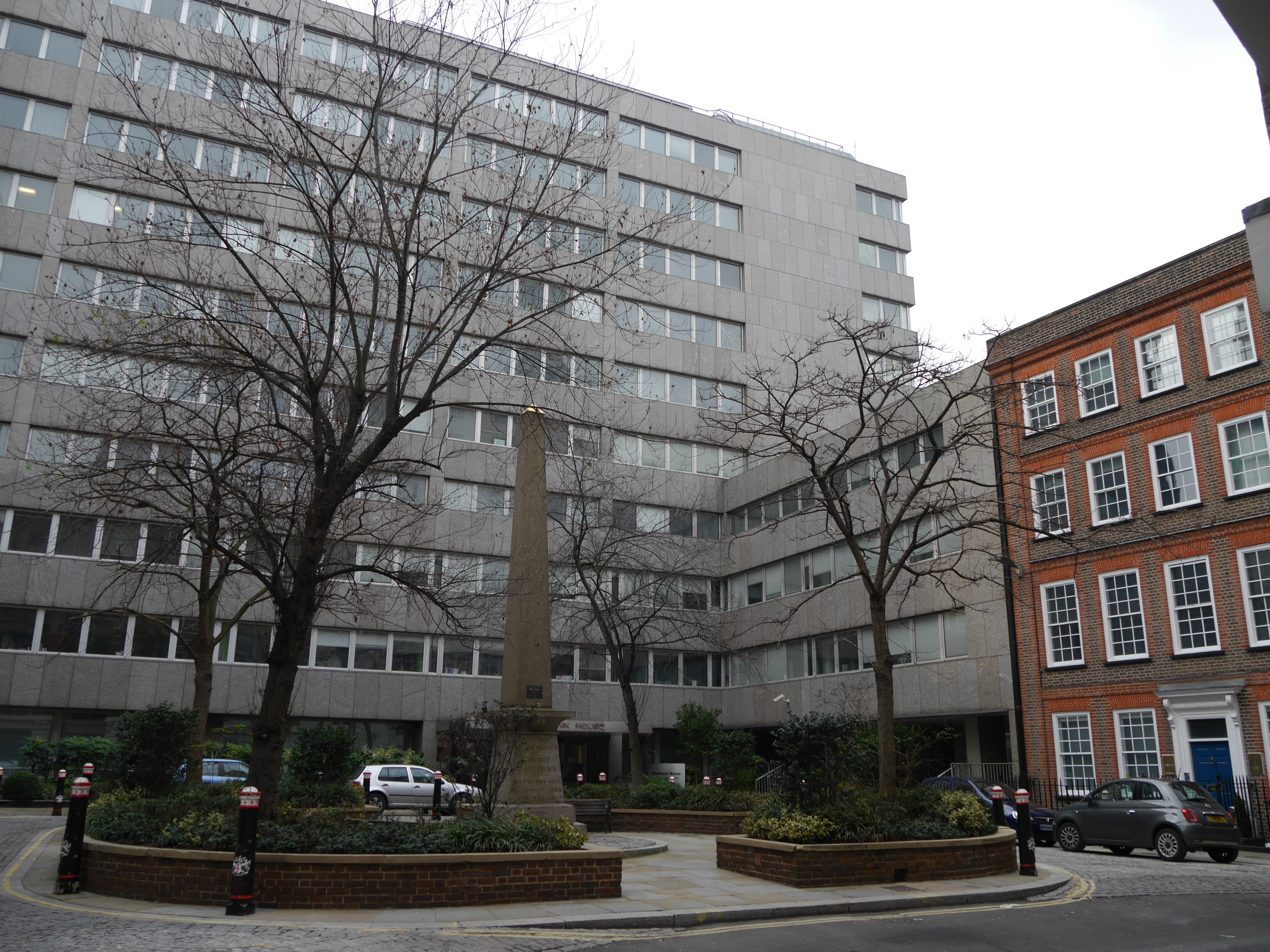
Salisbury's Square central garden and its north-west buildings in 2018

Salisbury Square is a square in London EC4.

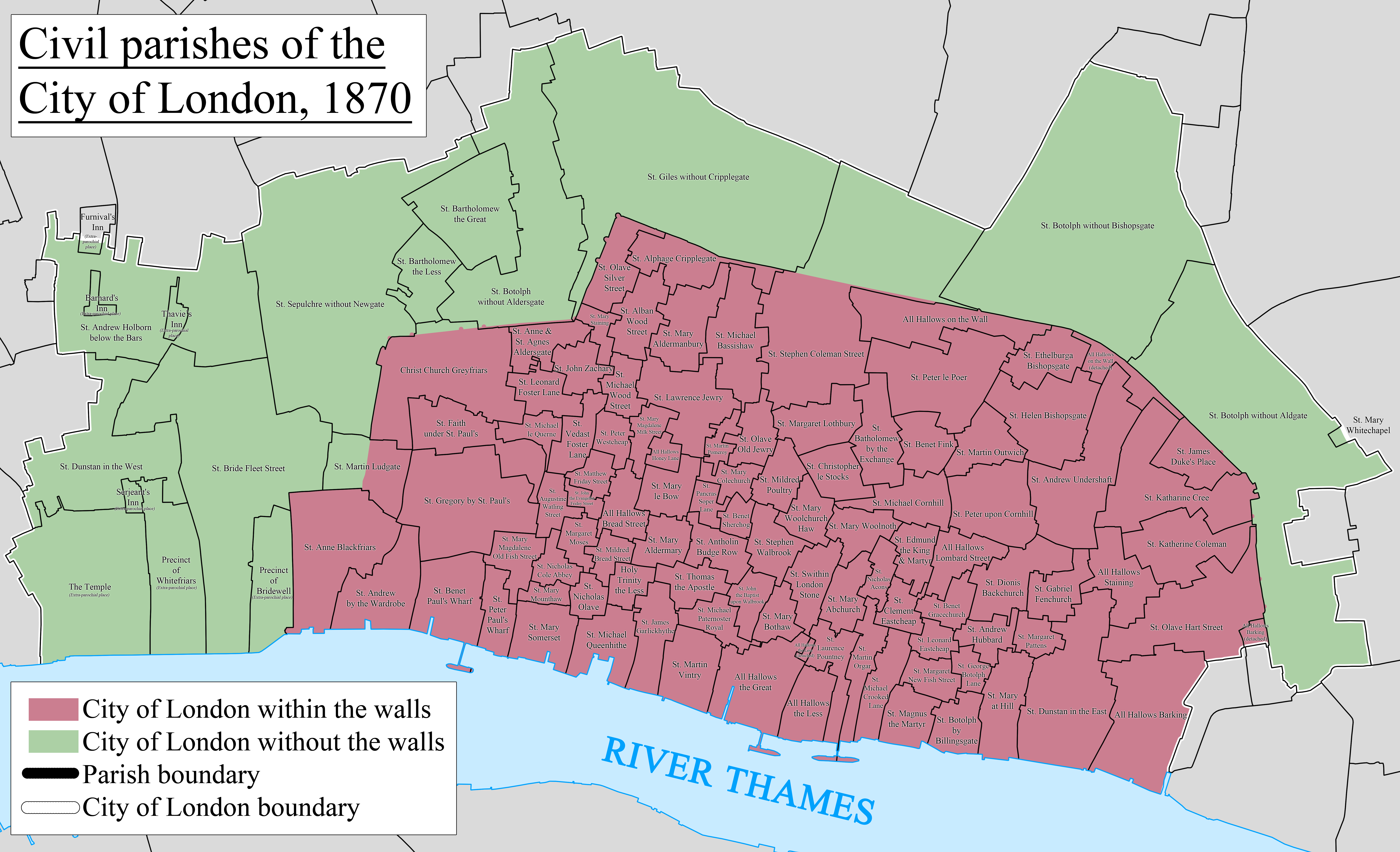
Extract from map of the old Anglican church parishes in the 1870s which shows shaded red the western area inside the ancient city walls, and green: other areas of the City of London; the southern projection of St Bride Fleet Street formed the medieval estate of the Bishops of Salisbury which was owned by the Earls of Dorset before the industrial revolution.

== History ==
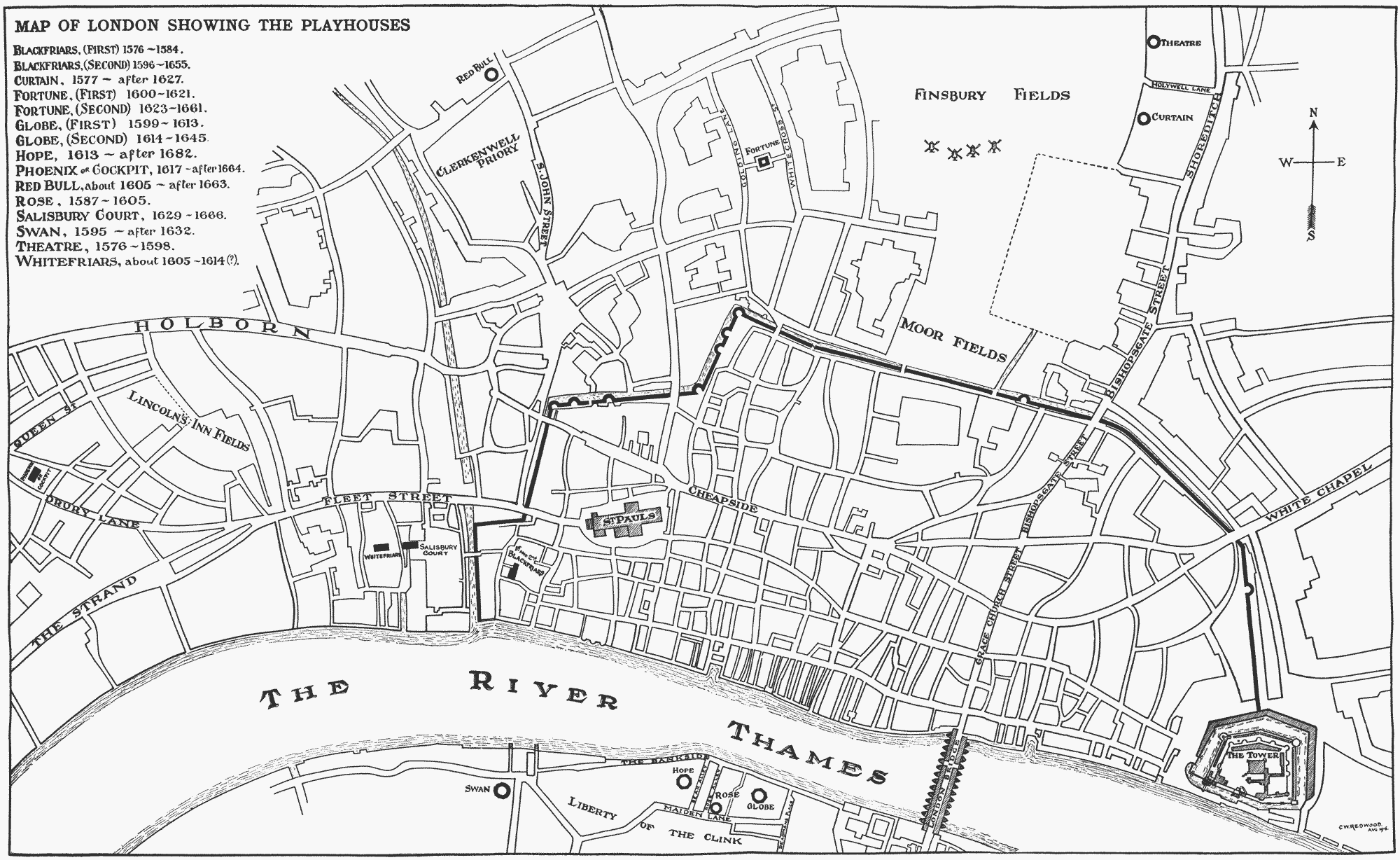
Detailed map of the theatre and the nascent square; the Whitefriars theatre closed before the theatre opened as a legend to the map states. Show all

The square is named after Salisbury Court, by and on part of the land, today the name of the narrow street which leads the square from the north. Salisbury Court was the medieval London house and episcopal court of the Bishop of Salisbury, beside or above which he maintained a well-appointed inn for visitors.

Between 1629 and 1666 a relatively long-lived theatre stood on its south side. The original building, repaired and altered, became Dorset House, as having been repossessed for Elizabeth I, Salisbury Court was taken by her Chancellor of the Exchequer Richard Sackville, scion of the Earls of Dorset for himself and his heirs. His great-grandson, Edward Sackville, 4th Earl of Dorset was the main promoter of the theatre and a patron of performing arts. The grounds and outbuildings of Dorset House, London included the nascent square.

Dorset House and the theatre burned down in the Great Fire of London in 1666. The theatre was replaced in 1671 by the Dorset Garden Theatre, which was built slightly further south to a design by Christopher Wren. The theatre is commemorated by a plaque on the Dorset Rise (east) side of the corporate building on the south side of Salisbury Square. By the early C19 the Salisbury Hotel occupied the south side of Salisbury Square, formerly the site of the Dorset Garden Theatre.

Salisbury Square was the third home to the Cogers debating group of which John Wilkes was one of the founding members. The debating group met at The Barley Mow pub from 1855.

An obelisk currently stands in the middle of Salisbury Square to Alderman Robert Waithman, a draper who became a politician and Lord Mayor of London. The obelisk was funded through public donation and calls Waithman "The friend of liberty in evil times."

Samuel Richardson's printing office was at the northwest corner of Salisbury Square, communicating with the court, No. 76, Fleet Street. Here Samuel Richardson wrote "Pamela," and here, in 1756, Oliver Goldsmith acted as his reader. In 1842 the publisher Edward Lloyd would occupy these premises. The penny weekly romances aimed at the newly literate working classes published by Edward Lloyd (1815-1890) were given the name Salisbury Square Fiction because of their provenance.

12 Salisbury Square also became the publishing address of Lloyd’s Weekly Newspaper, founded in 1842. Edward Lloyd’s Daily Chronicle acquired by Lloyd in 1876 also had its headquarters at 12 Salisbury Square. In 1918, when both newspapers were sold to the friends of Lloyd George they had 20% of the national newspaper market.
