= Salisbury Court (house) =

Salisbury Court was the medieval London house and episcopal court of the Bishop of Salisbury, beside or above which he maintained a well-appointed inn for visitors.

It was on Fleet Street between Whitefriars and St Bride's Church.

It was the centre of the Fleet Street riot in 1392.

Salisbury Court was acquired by Richard Sackville in 1564 during the last seven years of his life when he was Chancellor of the Exchequer under Queen Elizabeth; when Thomas Sackville was created Earl of Dorset in 1604, the building was renamed Dorset House. It became Salisbury Court Theatre.
