= Wenceslaus of Luxembourg =

Wenceslaus of Luxembourg may refer to:

- Wenceslaus I, Duke of Luxembourg (1337–1383)
- Wenceslaus IV of Bohemia (1361–1419), nephew and heir of prec.
