= League of Bologna =

14th-century defensive alliance

The League of Bologna was a defensive alliance concluded on 11 April 1392 by the Republic of Florence, Bologna, Padua, Ferrara, Imola, Faenza, and Ravenna, directed against the expansionist ambitions of Gian Galeazzo Visconti, lord (and after 1395 Duke) of Milan.

== Background ==
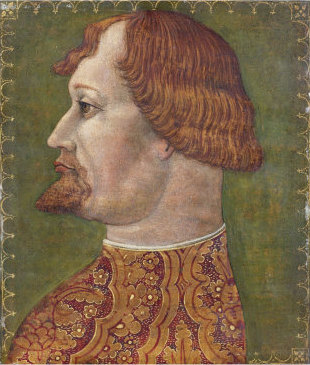
Portrait of Gian Galeazzo Visconti

After assassinating his uncle and father-in-law Bernabò Visconti in 1385, the lord of Pavia, Gian Galeazzo Visconti, became ruler of Milan, and in a short period of time established an extensive territorial state in northern Italy, aiming to claim the title of king of Lombardy and Tuscany. He gained the backing of Pope Urban IV and concluded an alliance with the Republic of Venice, which in 1387 allowed him to conquer the cities of Verona and Vicenza, putting an end to the Scaliger lordship there. Vicenza had been promised to Padua, but Visconti kept it for himself. In 1388, with Venetian support, Visconti attacked Padua as well, forcing its lord, Francesco Novello da Carrara, to capitulate and surrender all is domains in northern Italy—Padua itself, Treviso, Ceneda, Feltre, and Belluno—to the lord of Milan.

The rapid expansion of the Viscontean state worried the Republic of Florence, which made common cause with Bologna and enrolled the mercenary captain John Hawkwood in its defence. Florence and Bologna also tried to mediate on behalf of Francesco Novello, and later joined him in trying to find support against Visconti among the German princes who had married Bernabò's numerous daughters, especially the Dukes of Bavaria. Despite an agreement in October 1389 that demarcated the Milanese from the Florentine zones of influence in Italy, the drift to open war proved inevitable: already on the very next day, Florence, Bologna, Pisa, Lucca, and Perugia signed a defensive alliance directed against Visconti expansionism. In the conflict that followed, the First Florentine–Milanese War, the Florentines managed to recover Padua and secure the defection of Ferrara, but their offensive against Milan failed and only the skill of Hawkwood managed to extricate the exposed Florentine army from disaster. The war ended in January 1392 with both sides exhausted, and largely reflected the status quo ante, with the exception of Paduan independence, which was recognized in exchange for an indemnity of 10,000 florins to be paid annually over the next fifty years to Milan.

== League of Bologna ==
The breaking away of Padua from the Visconti dominions nevertheless was a significant setback for the lord of Milan, as it encouraged doubts among two of his allies, Alberto d'Este of Ferrara and Francesco I Gonzaga of Mantua. Especially the lord of Ferrara, whose authority was weak and his state precariously sandwiched between more powerful neighbours, sought close coordination with the Carrara lord in mutual defence. On 11 April 1392, a mutual defensive agreement was concluded between Florence, Bologna, Padua, Ferrara, and Florence's allies in the Romagna, Lodovico Alidosi of Imola, Astorre I Manfredi of Faenza, and the da Polenta brothers of Ravenna. Florence and Bologna also gave Francesco Novello a loan of 5,000 gold ducats to enable him to pay his indemnity to Visconti.

== Sources ==
- Bueno de Mesquita, D. M. (1941). Giangaleazzo Visconti, Duke of Milan (1351–1402): A Study in the Political Career of an Italian Despot. Cambridge: Cambridge University Press.
- Caferro, William (2006). John Hawkwood: An English Mercenary in Fourteenth-Century Italy. Baltimore: The Johns Hopkins University Press. ISBN 0-8018-8323-7.
- Kohl, Benjamin G. (1998). Padua under the Carrara, 1318–1405. Baltimore and London: Johns Hopkins University Press. ISBN 0-8018-5703-1.
- Najemy, John M. (2006). A History of Florence 1200–1575. Oxford: Blackwell Publishing. ISBN 978-1-4051-1954-2.
- Vaglienti, F. M. (1997). "Visconti, Gian Galeazzo". Lexikon des Mittelalters, VIII: Stadt (Byzantinisches Reich) bis Werl (in German). Stuttgart and Weimar: J. B. Metzler. col. 1723–1724. ISBN 3-89659-908-9.
