= Fleet Street riot =

1392 riot leading to royal intervention in London

Fleet Street riots
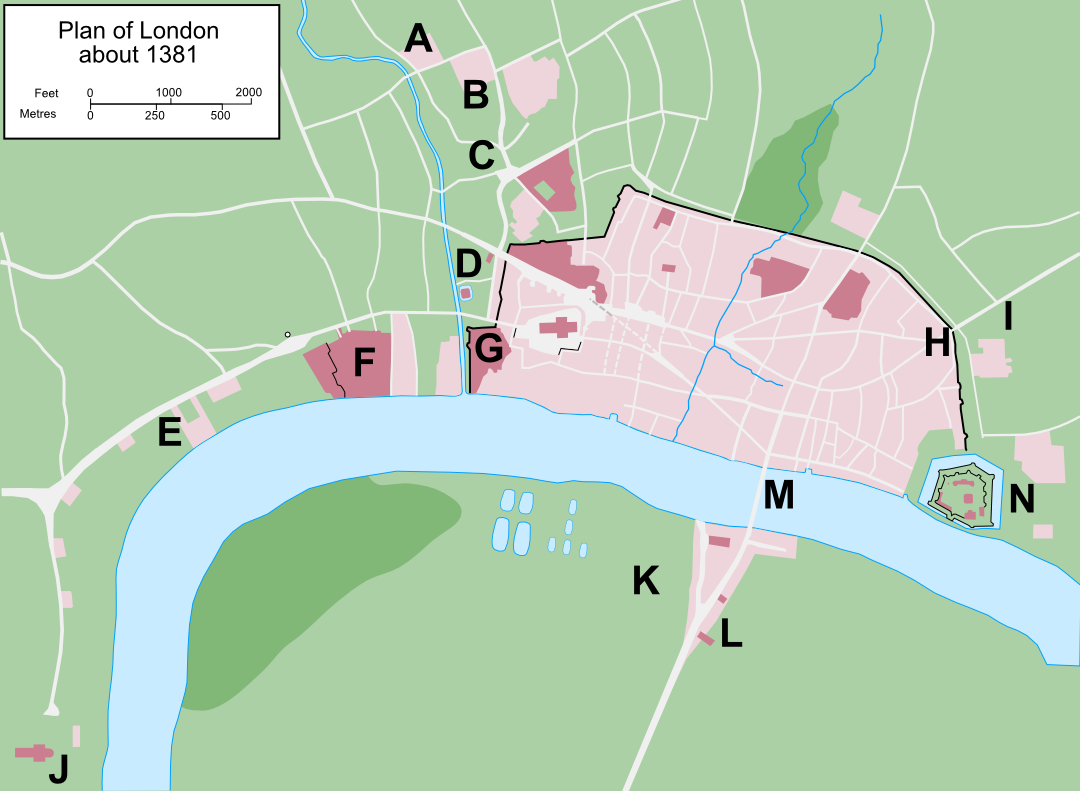
- Date: 1392
- Location: Fleet Street, City of London, England
- Caused by: Dispute over arrest rights; confrontation between a baker and a servant of a royal official
- Result: Removal and imprisonment of civic officials; revocation of London’s charter

Parties
City of London authorities	Royal officials of Richard II

Lead figures
John Hende	Richard II, John Waltham

Casualties and losses
Unknown	Unknown

The Fleet Street riot of 1392 were sparked by a confrontation involving a royal official’s servant that led King Richard II to investigate London’s governance and revoke the city’s charter.

London in the late fourteenth century had lively and sometimes violent political rivalries. In late 1391 and early 1392, the king and city argued over the right to claim vessels or goods in the Thames near London as deodand. In January 1392, as a result of the City authorities insisting on their sole right of arrest, King Richard ordered John Hende the mayor of London and three other Londoners to appear before him for eight consecutive days or to forfeit a bond of £1,000, although it is not recorded what the result of these discussions was.

John Waltham, Richard II's Lord High Treasurer, occupied a lodging on Fleet Street called Salisbury Court due to also holding the Bishopric of Salisbury. A riot taking place near here a few weeks after the mayor's summons when one of his servants named Romayn stole a loaf of horsebread from baker's basket; the baker assaulted the servant with an axe, breaking his skull, and the servant fled to take sanctuary from arrest in the bishop's inn. A riot ensued and Salisbury Court was attacked.

On 13 May 1392, King Richard ordered the Court of Common Pleas to move from Westminster Hall to York and despite the City of London extracting new oaths of allegiance from the population this was followed by moving the Court of Chancery before the end of May and the exchequer and the inmates of Fleet Prison. These moves did not just remove customers from London's tradesmen it also compelled Londoners to make an unaccustomed long journey for many legal disputes. It has been suggested that Richard may have been looking to set the capital in York, which was in a more politically friendly part of the country. The courts did return to Westminster Hall in the autumn.

On 29 May, Richard, who was at Stamford at the time, summoned London's mayor, sheriffs and aldermen to appear before him and his council on unspecified charges at Nottingham Castle on 25 June 1392. The mayor and sheriffs were removed from their offices and imprisoned, while Edward Dalyngrigge was appointed as Royal Warden of the city. The next month Hende was summoned to a hearing, with many other former officials, and fined, before being released on bail on 22 July.

The riot to an inquiry into London's "misgovernment" with a number of London's civic dignitaries summoned to Nottingham Castle and imprisoned and London losing its charter and so its ability to self govern with a warden appointed instead of the Lord Mayor. However historians such as Caroline Barron think that it was London's reluctance to lend money to Richard wince 1388 that was the root of the conflict. Over time, particularly under Richard Whittington the city did regain its rights, but only after payment to Richard.

== Sources ==
- Barron, Caroline M (1999). "Richard II and London". In Goodman, A.; Gillespie, J. L. (eds.). Richard II: The Art of Kingship. Oxford: Clarendon Press. pp. 129–154. ISBN 0-19-820189-3.
- Barron, Caroline; Carlin, Martha; Rosenthal, Joel T. (2017). "Medieval London: Collected Papers of Caroline M. Barron" (PDF). Research in Medieval and Early Modern Culture (9).
- Castor, Helen (2024). The Eagle and the Hart: The Tragedy of Richard II and Henry IV.
- Davies, John Silvester, ed. (1838). An English Chronicle of the Reigns of Richard II., Henry IV., Henry V., and Henry VI. Camden Society.
- Thompson, Michael (1998). Medieval bishops' houses in England and Wales. Aldershot: Ashgate. ISBN 1840142774.
- Rawcliffe, Carole (1993). "VANNER, Henry (d.1395), of London". The History of Parliament. Vol. The House of Commons 1386–1421. Boydell and Brewer.
- Sutton, Anne F. (2017). "Whittington, Richard [Dick]". Oxford Dictionary of National Biography (online ed.). Oxford University Press. (Subscription, Wikipedia Library access or UK public library membership required.)
