= 1925 University of Oxford Chancellor election =

The 1925 University of Oxford election for the position of Chancellor was called upon the death of the incumbent Chancellor, George Curzon, 1st Marquess Curzon of Kedleston on 20 March 1925.

== Electorate ==
The electorate consisted of all members of the University holding the rank of MA. Votes had to be cast in person at Oxford.

== First election ==
Initially Alfred Milner, 1st Viscount Milner was elected unopposed. However he died on 13 May, twelve days before he was due to be installed.

== Second election ==
A further election was held.

=== Candidates ===
The following candidates were nominated:

- Herbert Henry Asquith, 1st Earl of Oxford and Asquith, alumnus & fellow of Balliol College, incumbent Leader of the Liberal Party and former Prime Minister
- George Cave, 1st Viscount Cave, alumnus of St John's College, Conservative politician and incumbent Lord Chancellor

Former Foreign Secretary Viscount Grey, who was to be elected unopposed to the post a few years later, was initially approached to stand. He was thought to have support in Balliol (despite his undistinguished academic record), amongst League of Nations supporters and amongst women graduates, but withdrew in Asquith's favour.

Initially Asquith was the only candidate and Cave was approached to stand. He was reluctant to do so, believing he had little chance in an election against Asquith and that losing would reflect badly on the Conservative Party, but after considerable persuasion he agreed to be nominated.

The election was dominated by party feeling. Asquith's grandiose title of Earl of Oxford and Asquith was held up to some ridicule. He suspected he might lose because of the hostility of the country clergy, who still made up a significant bloc of Oxford electors, to Welsh Disestablishment. Asquith's political opponent Lord Birkenhead wrote to The Times on 19 May, describing Asquith as the "greatest living Oxonian", but his support may have done more harm than good, as Birkenhead was seen as morally dubious, having been a leading member of the discredited Lloyd George Coalition which had fallen from power in October 1922, and was also openly sceptical both of religion and of the League of Nations. It was quipped that Asquith was "a warming-pan" for Birkenhead's views (a learned Oxford joke, referring to the legend that the Old Pretender had been an impostor baby rather than a rightful heir to the throne).

=== Result ===
The results were as follows:

Candidate	Votes	%
✓ Viscount Cave	987	69.1
Earl of Oxford and Asquith	441	30.9
Turnout	1428	

== See also ==
- Election for the Chancellorship of the University of Oxford, 1960
- Election for the Chancellorship of the University of Oxford, 1987
- Election for the Chancellorship of the University of Oxford, 2003
- Election for the Chancellorship of the University of Cambridge, 2011
- List of chancellors of the University of Oxford

== Book used for citation ==
- Koss, Stephen (1985). Asquith. London: Hamish Hamilton. ISBN 978-0-231-06155-1.
