= Nicholas Hereford =

English priest and Lollard leader (died 1940)

Nicholas [of] Hereford (died 1420) was an English Bible translator, Lollard, reformer on the side of John Wycliffe, Fellow of The Queen's College, Oxford and Chancellor of the University of Oxford in 1382. He was a Doctor of Theology, which he achieved at Oxford University in 1382.

== Biography ==
His name probably came from the southwestern English city of Hereford. Nicholas studied at the University of Oxford, and was ordained a priest in 1370 and earned in 1382 the degree of Doctor of Theology. Nicholas criticized the luxury of the Church and reaffirmed the right of every Christian to attain his own faith by reading the Bible.

Nicholas collaborated in producing the English-language version of the Bible known as Wycliffe's Bible. He is believed to have been entrusted with the translation of the Old Testament, the major part of which was completed by 1382. He was condemned with Wycliffe and other Lollards for their views and had to appear in 1382 at the court of the Archbishop of Canterbury to revoke. When they refused to revoke their views, they were excommunicated. He immediately traveled to Rome to appeal his excommunication before Pope Urban VI, but was imprisoned. During a popular uprising against the Pope in June 1385, he escaped and traveled back to England. Upon his return, however, he was re-imprisoned by William Courtenay, the Archbishop of Canterbury, and his writings were confiscated and destroyed by order of King Richard II of England.

In 1391, he finally revoked his church-critical views being reconciled with the Roman Catholic Church and was appointed in the same year the chancellor of Hereford Cathedral and in 1395 to the St Paul's Cathedral in London. From 1397 to 1417 he was treasurer in Hereford. A few years before his death he resigned as treasurer and entered the Carthusian Order. Nicholas died in 1420 in the Charterhouse of Coventry. His only surviving work on which he has collaborated is the Wycliffite Bible.

== See also ==
- Hereford in Herefordshire, England

Academic offices
Preceded by Robert Rygge	Chancellor of the University of Oxford; 1382	Succeeded by William Rugge? or Robert Rygge
