= Richard Courtenay =

15th-century Bishop of Norwich

- Bishop of Norwich
- Appointed: June 1413
- Term ended: September 1415
- Predecessor: Alexander Tottington
- Successor: John Wakering
- Other posts: Dean of St Asaph; Dean of Wells

Orders
- Consecration: 17 September 1413

Personal details
- Died: c. 15 September 1415 Harfleur, France
- Buried: Westminster Abbey
- Denomination: Roman Catholic
- Parents: Sir Philip Courtenay of Powderham Castle
- Education: Exeter College, Oxford

Richard Courtenay (died 15 September 1415) was an English prelate and university chancellor, who served as Bishop of Norwich from 1413 to 1415.

== Life ==
Courtenay was a son of Sir Philip Courtenay of Powderham Castle near Exeter, and a grandson of Hugh de Courtenay, 10th Earl of Devon (died 1377). He was a nephew of William Courtenay, archbishop of Canterbury, and a descendant of King Edward I of England. From an early age he was renowned for his intellect and personal beauty. He was nicknamed "the flower of Devon".

Educated at Exeter College, Oxford, Courtenay entered the church, where his advance was rapid. He held several prebends, was Dean of St Asaph and then Dean of Wells, and became Bishop of Norwich in June 1413, being consecrated on 17 September 1413.

As Chancellor of the University of Oxford, an office to which Courtenay was elected more than once, Courtenay asserted the independence of the university against Thomas Arundel, Archbishop of Canterbury, in 1411; but the Archbishop, supported by King Henry IV and Antipope John XXIII, eventually triumphed.

Courtenay was a close friend of King Henry V both before and after he came to the throne; and in 1413, immediately after Henry's accession, he was made treasurer of the royal household. On two occasions he went on diplomatic errands to France, and he was also employed by Henry on public business at home. Having accompanied the king to Harfleur in August 1415, Courtenay succumbed to dysentery and died about 15 September 1415. The closeness of their attachment has led to speculation that Courtenay may have been the monarch's homosexual lover.

== Family ==
Another member of this family was Peter Courtenay (died 1492), a grandnephew of Richard. He also attained high position in the English Church.

== Citations ==
Academic offices
Preceded by Robert Alum	Chancellor of the University of Oxford; 1407	Succeeded by Richard Ullerston
Preceded by William Sulburge	Chancellor of the University of Oxford; 1411–1412	Succeeded by William Sulburge
Preceded by William Sulburge	Chancellor of the University of Oxford; 1412–1413	Succeeded by William Sulburge
Catholic Church titles
Preceded by Alexander Tottington	Bishop of Norwich; 1413–1415	Succeeded by John Wakering
