= Prestbury =

Prestbury may refer to:

== Places ==
- Prestbury, Cheshire
- Prestbury, Gloucestershire
- Prestbury, a subdivision of Aurora, Illinois

== People ==
- Thomas Prestbury, a medieval English Benedictine abbot and university chancellor
