= Philip Repyngdon =

15th-century Bishop of Lincoln

Philip Repyngdon DD, CRSA
- Bishop of Lincoln
- Province: Canterbury
- Appointed: 19 November 1404
- Installed: 8 April 1405
- Term ended: 21 November 1419
- Predecessor: Henry Beaufort
- Successor: Richard Fleming
- Previous posts: Abbot of Leicester and Chancellor of the University of Oxford

Orders
- Ordination: 26 May 1369
- Consecration: 29 March 1405
- Created cardinal: 19 September 1408, but revoked in 1409
- Rank: Cardinal priest

Personal details
- Born: c. 1345 Wales
- Died: 1424 (aged 78–79)
- Buried: Lincoln Cathedral
- Denomination: Roman Catholic Church

Philip Repyngdon (Note: Or Repington, or Repyndon) (c. 1345 – 1424) was a bishop and cardinal.

== Life ==
It is believed Repyngdon was born in Wales in around 1345. He became an Augustinian canon, first at Repton Abbey, then at Leicester Abbey where he was ordained to the priesthood on 26 May 1369. He may have been educated at Broadgates Hall, Oxford, although Simon Forde argues against this, since it was for law students and he was a theologian. In any case, he graduated from the University of Oxford as a Doctor of Divinity in 1382.

A man of learning, Repyngdon came to the front as a defender of the doctrines taught by John Wycliffe; for this he was suspended and afterwards excommunicated, but in a short time he was pardoned and restored by Archbishop William Courtenay, and he appears to have completely abandoned his unorthodox opinions.

In 1394, Repyngdon was made abbot of the abbey of Saint Mary de Pratis at Leicester, and after the accession of Henry IV to the English throne in 1399 he became chaplain and confessor to this king, being described as clericus specialissimus domini regis Henrici. From 1400 to 1403, Repyngdon was chancellor of Oxford University.

On 19 November 1404, Repyngdon was chosen bishop of Lincoln, and was consecrated on 29 March 1405. In 1408, Pope Gregory XII created him a cardinal, however, it was not recognised in England, and the creation was revoked in 1409.

In 1405, Repyngdon attempted to promote a pilgrimage site at Yarborough devoted to the Blessed Sacrament, after the church there was destroyed by fire. The pyx which contained the consecrated Host was the only thing to survive the fire, and the bishop attempted to establish a cult centre there, but it failed.

His health failing, Repyngdon resigned his bishopric on 20 November 1419. He retired to Leicester, although his last years might have been spent in the hospital of the College of the Annunciation of Our Lady of the Newarke rather than his priory. Despite his wish for a modest burial, he was buried in the south-east transept of Lincoln Cathedral. Some of Repyngdon's sermons are in manuscripts at Oxford and Cambridge.

== Bibliography ==
- Burton, Edwin Hubert (1911). "Philip Repington" . In Herbermann, Charles (ed.). Catholic Encyclopedia. Vol. 12. New York: Robert Appleton Company.
- Chisholm, Hugh, ed. (1911). "Repington, Philip" . Encyclopædia Britannica. Vol. 23 (11th ed.). Cambridge University Press. p. 105.
- Forde, S (2008). "Repyndon [Repington, Repingdon], Philip (c. 1345–1424), bishop of Lincoln". Oxford Dictionary of National Biography. (subscription required)
- Fryde, E. B.; Greenway, D. E.; Porter, S.; Roy, I., eds. (1986). Handbook of British Chronology (3rd, reprinted 2003 ed.). Cambridge: Cambridge University Press. ISBN 0-521-56350-X.
- Schofield, Nicholas; Skinner, Gerard (2007). The English Cardinals. Oxford: Family Publications. ISBN 978-1-871217-65-0.
- Swanson, R. N. (1995). Religion and Devotion in Europe, c. 1215 — c. 1515. Cambridge Medieval Textbooks. Cambridge, UK: Cambridge University Press. ISBN 0-521-37950-4.

Catholic Church titles
Preceded by Henry Beaufort	Bishop of Lincoln; 1405–1419	Succeeded by Richard Fleming
Academic offices
Preceded by Thomas Hyndeman	Chancellor of the University of Oxford; 1397	Succeeded by Henry Beaufort
Preceded by Thomas Hyndeman	Chancellor of the University of Oxford; 1400–1403	Succeeded by Robert Alum
