= Nigel de Wavere =

English theologian

Nigel de Wavere DD (also Waver, Wavery, or Waure) was an English medieval theologian, churchman, college fellow, and university chancellor.

Nigel de Wavere was from Cahors in Guienne. He was a Fellow at Merton College, Oxford in 1312 and received a Doctor of Divinity degree. He became a Canon of St David's Cathedral in Wales and a Rector of Croydon. Between 1330 and 1332, he was Chancellor of Oxford University. He was also a Prebend of Lichfield.

Academic offices
Preceded by Roger de Streton	Chancellor of the University of Oxford; 1330–1332	Succeeded by Ralph Radyn
