= Ralph of Shrewsbury =

14th-century Bishop of Bath and Wells

- Bishop of Bath and Wells
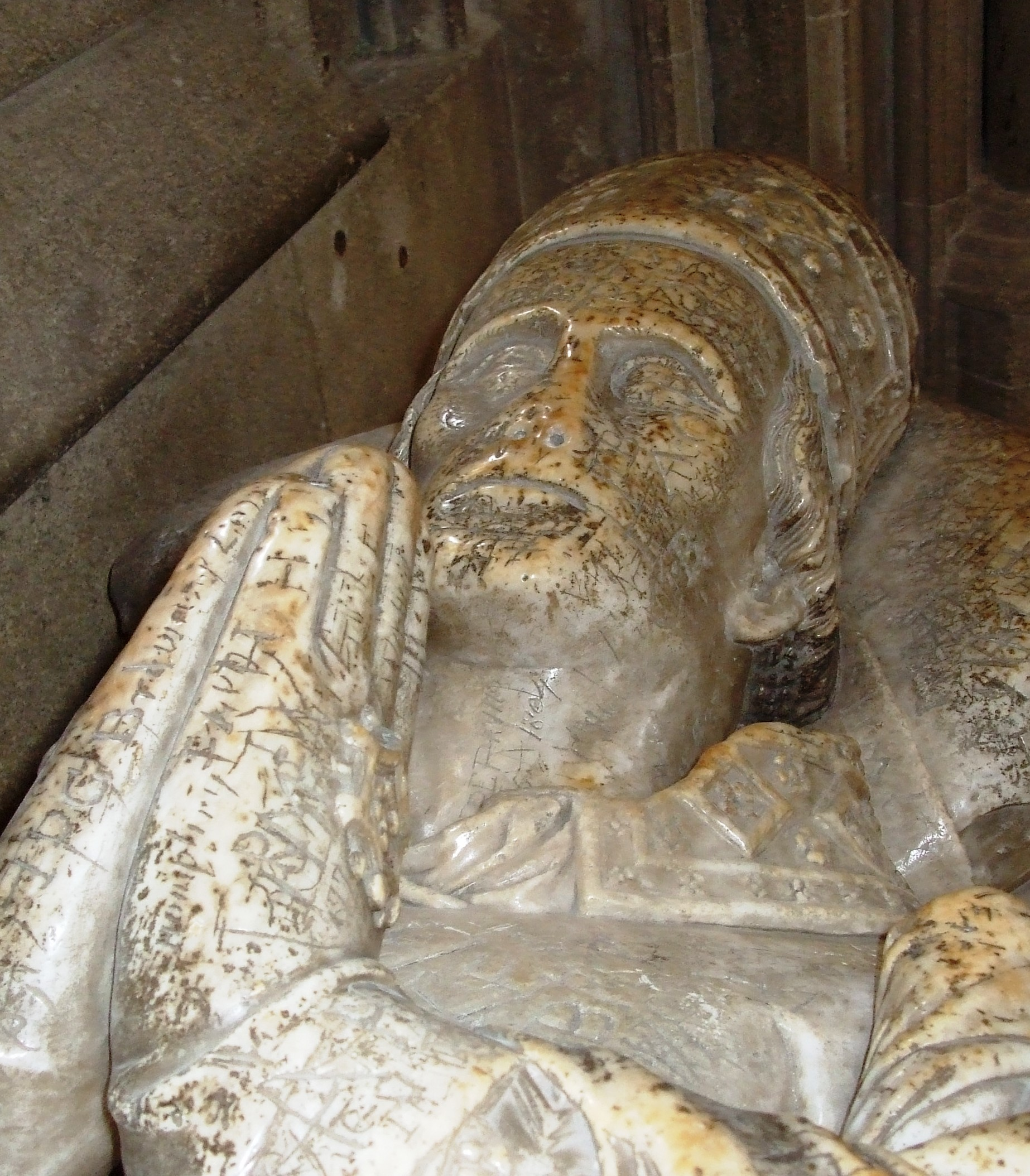
- Elected: 2 June 1329
- Term ended: 14 August 1363
- Predecessor: John Droxford
- Successor: John Barnet

Orders
- Consecration: 3 September 1329

Personal details
- Died: 14 August 1363
- Denomination: Catholic

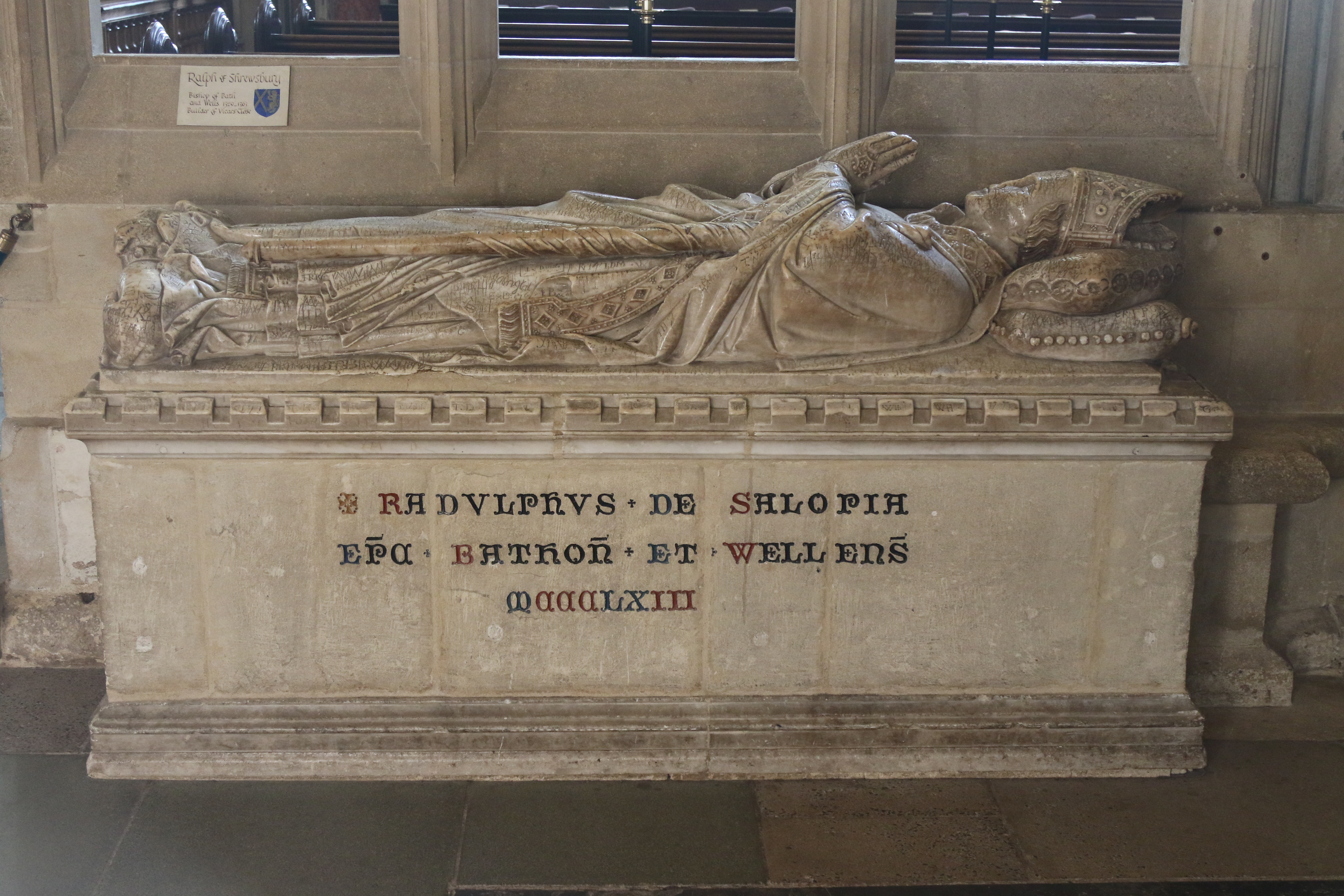
Tomb in Wells Cathedral

Ralph of Shrewsbury (Note: Or Radulphus de Salopia or Ralph de Salopia or Ralf of Shrewsburie;) (died 1363) was an English medieval bishop and university chancellor.

== Life ==
From 1328 to 1329, Ralph was Chancellor of the University of Oxford.

On 2 June 1329 Ralph was elected Bishop of Bath and Wells and consecrated on 3 September 1329. He died on 14 August 1363.

Ralph founded Vicars Close.

== Citations ==
Academic offices
Preceded by Thomas Hotham	Chancellor of the University of Oxford; 1328–1329	Succeeded by Roger de Streton
Catholic Church titles
Preceded by John Droxford	Bishop of Bath and Wells; 1329–1363	Succeeded by John Barnet
