= Tottington =

Tottington may refer to:

== Places ==
- Tottington, Greater Manchester, a small town between Bury and Ramsbottom
  - Tottington High School
  - Tottington railway station, closed 1963
- Tottington, Norfolk, a deserted village and civil parish
- Great Tottington, a moated manor farm near Maidstone in the English county of Kent

== People ==
- Alexander Tottington (before 1406–1413), Bishop of Norwich
- Samson of Tottington (1135-1211), English Benedictine monk from Tottington, Norfolk
