= Thomas Brightwell =

English college Fellow and university Chancellor

Thomas Brightwell DD (a.k.a. Brytwell) was an English medieval college Fellow and university Chancellor.

Brightwell was a Fellow of Merton College, Oxford and Chancellor of the University of Oxford during 1388–90. He was a Doctor of Divinity.

Academic offices
| Preceded by Robert Rygge | Chancellor of the University of Oxford; 1388–1390 | Succeeded by Thomas Cranley |
