= William Berton =

English college Fellow and university Chancellor

William Berton was an English medieval college Fellow and university Chancellor.

== Life ==
Berton was a Fellow of Merton College, Oxford and twice Chancellor of the University of Oxford during 1379–81 and 1382. He was a Doctor of Divinity. The controversy surrounding the theologian John Wycliffe concerning the sacrament was current at the time of Berton's Chancellorship and he gave some credence to Wycliffe's argument.

Academic offices
Preceded by Robert Aylesham	Chancellor of the University of Oxford; 1379–1381	Succeeded by Robert Rygge
Preceded by Robert Rygge	Chancellor of the University of Oxford; 1382	Succeeded by Robert Rygge
