= Richard Northalis =

English-born cleric and judge

Richard Northalis (died 20 July 1397) was an English-born cleric and judge who spent much of his life in Ireland. He held the offices of Bishop of Ossory, Archbishop of Dublin and Lord Chancellor of Ireland. For the last decade of his life, he was one of the English Crown's most trusted advisers on Irish affairs.

== Early life ==
He was born in Middlesex, the son of John Northales (died 1349), also known as John Clarke, who was Sheriff of London in 1335-6. He entered the Carmelite order in London. He gained a reputation as a preacher of great eloquence, and was appointed a royal chaplain. He was Bishop of Ossory from 1386 to 1396 - the office was probably as a reward for his long service to the Crown - and was then briefly Archbishop of Dublin.

== Crown servant ==
He was a diplomat and statesman of considerable repute. He was envoy to the Holy See in 1388 and was a trusted adviser to King Richard II in his dealings with the Holy See and in Irish affairs. As a mark of royal favour he was given an export licence for a wide variety of items, including hawks, falcons, gold and silver. Affairs of state kept him out of Ireland for much of the years 1388-90, during which time there were serious disturbances in his diocese; he later complained of his inability to collect the diocesan revenues, and the unhelpful attitude of the Royal Government, which he accused of withholding two-thirds of the revenue which was due to him, in contravention of a royal order of 1389 that he continue to enjoy the temporalities of the See. In 1390 he was given a royal commission to inquire into corruption, maladministration and abuse of office by Irish officials. The powers granted to him by the commission (which was a familiar medieval response to complaints about the misgovernment of Ireland) were very wide, no doubt an indication of the high degree of trust placed in him by the Crown. He was entitled to examine all official records and summon any official for questioning. All Crown servants, even the Lord Lieutenant of Ireland, were required to co-operate with the Bishop.

The King, in 1391, referred to Richard as a man on whom he greatly relied for his "circumspection, prudence and fidelity". He was given special permission to travel at will outside his diocese for three years, while continuing to draw the profits. He spent much of the spring and summer of 1391 in England in constant attendance on the King, advising him on his dealings with the Vatican, which were particularly difficult at that time due to the Papal Schism. On his return to Ireland, he was made a member of the Privy Council of Ireland and acted as Justiciar of Kilkenny. He was summoned to the Great Council which was held in Kilkenny in 1395 where the King, uniquely in the annals of Irish history, was personally present.

== Chancellor and archbishop ==
He was Lord Chancellor of Ireland from 1393 to 1397. In addition to his judicial duties, he is said to have shouldered much of the burden of government, including the task of keeping the peace between the Gaelic clans and English settlers. He petitioned the Privy Council for an additional allowance of twenty pounds, complaining that his salary as Lord Chancellor, which was sixty marks a year, (equivalent to forty pounds sterling), did not cover even one-third of his expenses, and that the low salary was the result of the malice of his opponents in government. He worked closely with James Butler, 3rd Earl of Ormonde, the Lord Lieutenant of Ireland, and accompanied him on an armed expedition to Munster. He obtained special leave to visit England without incurring the normal penalties imposed on absentees from Ireland, on the condition that he furnish a troop of soldiers for the defence of the realm; this was a blow against his opponents, who had tried to enforce the statute forbidding travel against him. He became Archbishop of Dublin in 1396: he died in Dublin died only a year later and was buried in St. Patrick's Cathedral. In his short tenure as Archbishop he had one notable achievement: the Archbishop of Dublin was confirmed in office as admiral of the leading port of Dalkey, south of Dublin city.

== Works ==
A number of works are attributed to him, none of which survive: they include Sermones and Ad Ecclesarium Paroches. His authorship of a Hymn to Canute is disputed.

Catholic Church titles
Preceded by Robert Waldby	Archbishop of Dublin; 1395–1397	Succeeded by Thomas Cranley

== Sources ==
Lee, Sidney, ed. (1895). "Northalis, Richard" . Dictionary of National Biography. Vol. 41. London: Smith, Elder & Co.
