= Hugh de Willoughby =

English theologian and university chancellor

Hugh de Willoughby was an English medieval theologian and university chancellor.

Hugh de Willoughby achieved a Doctor of Divinity degree. Between 1334 and 1335, he was Chancellor of Oxford University. Between 1347 and 1348, he was Vice-Chancellor of the university.

Academic offices
Preceded by Ralph Radyn	Chancellor of the University of Oxford; 1334–1335	Succeeded by Robert de Stratford
Preceded by John de Reigham	Vice-Chancellor of the University of Oxford; 1347–1348	Succeeded by William de Hawkesworth
