= Walter de Scauren =

Medieval university chancellor

Walter de Scauren was an English medieval university chancellor.

Walter de Scauren became Chancellor of the University of Oxford on the 10th of June 1341 after the cession of William de Skelton.

Academic offices
Preceded by William de Skelton	Chancellor of the University of Oxford; 1341	Succeeded by William de Bergeveney
