= Ralph Redruth =

English college Fellow and university Chancellor

Ralph Redruth DD (also Redruffe or Ruderhith) was an English medieval college Fellow and university Chancellor.

Redruth was a Cornish Fellow of Exeter College, Oxford and one of two Senior Fellows of Oriel College, Oxford. He was Chancellor of the University of Oxford during 1392–93.

== See also ==
- Redruth, a town in Cornwall

Academic offices
| Preceded by Robert Rygge | Chancellor of the University of Oxford; 1392–1393 | Succeeded by Thomas Prestbury |
