= John Turke =

English medieval college Fellow and university chancellor

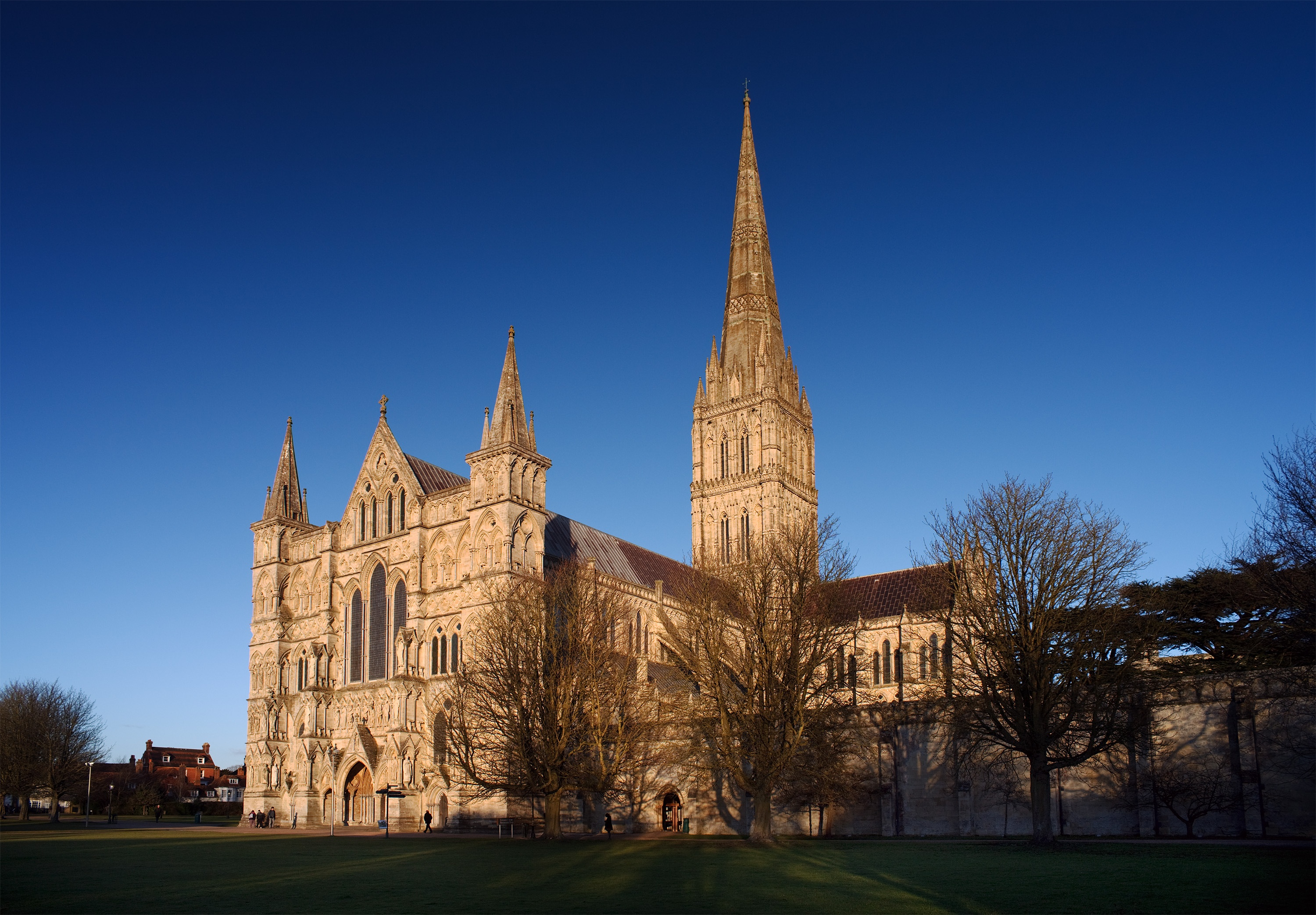
Salisbury Cathedral in southern England, where John Turke was canon in the 14th century

John Turke was an English medieval college Fellow and university chancellor.

Turke was a Fellow of Merton College, Oxford, and Chancellor of the University of Oxford between 1376 and 1377. He was a Doctor of Divinity and later canon of Salisbury Cathedral.

Academic offices
Preceded by William de Wylton	Chancellor of the University of Oxford; 1376–1377	Succeeded by Adam de Toneworth
