= Thomas Cranley =

Archbishop of Dublin and Lord Chancellor of Ireland

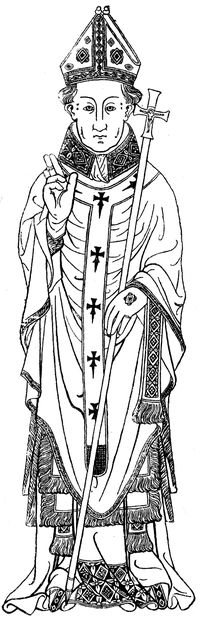
Thomas Cranley, Archbishop of Dublin, 1397-1417: from his brass at New College, Oxford. Showing the archepiscopal mass-vestments and the cross and pall. Date, about 1400

Thomas Cranley DD a.k.a. Thomas Craule (c. 1340–1417) was a leading statesman, judge and cleric in early fifteenth-century Ireland, who held the offices of Chancellor of Oxford University, Archbishop of Dublin and Lord Chancellor of Ireland.

== Early career ==
He was born in England about 1340; little seems to be known about his family. He entered the Carmelite order. He is recorded as a Fellow of Merton College, Oxford, in 1366. He was appointed as the first Warden of Winchester College in 1382, a feeder school for New College. He subsequently became Warden of New College in 1389 and Chancellor of the University of Oxford in 1390. He was a Doctor of Divinity and a judge.

== Irish career ==
In 1397, on the death of Richard Northalis, he was made Archbishop of Dublin and arrived in Ireland the following year. After the accession of King Henry IV, Cranley undertook a diplomatic mission to Rome, and was made Lord Chancellor of Ireland in 1401. When Henry's son Thomas, Duke of Clarence, was made Lord Deputy of Ireland, Cranley was appointed to his council. A letter which he sent to the King around the end of 1402 painted a grim picture of the state of English rule in Ireland. Cranley assured the King of his absolute loyalty to both the King and his son, but implored the King to send over money and men since "your son is so destitute of money that he has not a penny in the world ... and his soldiers have departed from him, and the people of his household are on the point of leaving". The King, who was generally short of money, is not known to have responded to this plea. Cranley himself could probably have contributed something to the Deputy's expenses: certainly, he was sufficiently well off to lend the Mayor of Dublin 40 marks in 1402. On the other hand there is no doubt that Crown revenue in Ireland was at a very low ebb, which contributed to the weakening of English rule in Ireland through the early fifteenth century.

The pressure of official business, combined with the effects of ill health and old age, made Cranley increasingly unfit to perform his duties, and in his later years the functions of the Chancellor were usually carried out by his deputies, first Thomas de Everdon, then Laurence Merbury, and then Roger Hawkenshaw. Cranley resigned as Chancellor in 1410, but in 1413 the new King Henry V reappointed him to that office, with a part payment of two-thirds of the annual salary of £500. This is a tribute to the high regard in which the Lord Lieutenant of Ireland, the Earl of Shrewsbury, held him. He also became Justiciar of Ireland, following the sudden death of Sir John Stanley in January 1414, although in view of his age and ill health it was understood that this was only a temporary appointment. He recalled the Irish Parliament which Stanley had summoned in Dublin the previous November. It reconvened in February, but refused to grant the taxes he requested.As Justiciar he was assisted by a military council, made up of such noted soldiers as the Gascony-born knight Sir Jenico d'Artois. Despite their expertise, in 1414 the Anglo-Irish suffered one of their worst military defeats of the era, when they were crushed by O'Connor Fahy and his army in County Offaly.

He became prebendary of Clonmethan in north County Dublin in 1410: in 1414 he was sued by the Crown for recovery of the profits of the prebend for the previous two years, on the grounds that he had been an absentee prebend, but the lawsuit was dismissed when Cranley produced the King's letters patent authorising his absence.

== Death ==
In 1417 he was asked to present a memorial on the state of Ireland, which was highly critical of Lord Shrewsbury's record as Lord Lieutenant, to the English Crown. He reached England, but he was an old man even by modern standards, and in frail health. The journey proved to be too much for his constitution, and he died at Faringdon in Oxfordshire on 25 May. He was buried in New College, Oxford: his memorial brass survives, and the inscription on his tomb hails him as "the flower of prelates".

== Appearance and character ==
Early historians praised Cranley for both his mental and physical qualities: "thou art fair beyond the children of men, grace is diffused through thy lips because of thine eloquence" wrote one particularly eloquent admirer. He was described as tall and commanding in appearance, with fair hair and a ruddy complexion; his personality was witty, eloquent and learned. As a cleric, he was described as charitable to the poor, a notable preacher and a great builder of churches. The Parliament of Ireland in 1421 praised him as the model of what a good chief governor should be.

Catholic Church titles
Preceded by Richard Northalis	Archbishop of Dublin; 1397–1417	Succeeded by Richard Talbot
Academic offices
Preceded by Nicholas Wykeham	Wardens of New College, Oxford; 1389–1396	Succeeded by Richard Malford
Preceded by Thomas Brightwell	Chancellor of the University of Oxford; 1390–1391	Succeeded by Robert Rygge
