= William de Wylton =

English university chancellor

William de Wylton DD (also Wilton) was an English medieval college Fellow and university chancellor.

William de Wylton was a Fellow of Balliol College, University College, and Queen's College, all in Oxford. He was a Doctor of Divinity and held the office of Chancellor of the University of Oxford between 1373 and 1376.

Academic offices
Preceded by William de Remmyngton	Chancellor of the University of Oxford; 1373–1376	Succeeded by John Turke
