= William Sulburge =

English mediaeval churchman

William Sulburge was an English medieval churchman and university Chancellor.

Sulburge was three times Chancellor of the University of Oxford during 1410–13.

Academic offices
Preceded by Thomas Prestbury	Chancellor of the University of Oxford; 1410–1411	Succeeded by Richard Courtenay
Preceded by Richard Courtenay	Chancellor of the University of Oxford; 1412	Succeeded by Richard Courtenay
Preceded by Richard Courtenay	Chancellor of the University of Oxford; 1413	Succeeded by William Barrow
