= Richard Ullerston =

English priest and academic

Richard Ullerston DD (died August or September 1423) was a Vice-Chancellor and Chancellor of Oxford University.

Ullerston was born in the Duchy of Lancaster, England. Having been ordained priest in December, 1383, he became a Fellow of Queen's College, Oxford (1391–1403), holding office in the college, and proceeding to Doctor of Divinity and Vice-Chancellor of Oxford University in 1394. In 1408, he became Chancellor of the University and in the same year wrote at the request of Robert Hallum, Bishop of Salisbury, a sketch of proposed ecclesiastical reforms: Petitiones quoad reformationis ecclesiae militantis, which is available online (see below).

Ullerston wrote a commentary on the Creed (1409), one on the Psalms (1415), another on the Canticle of Canticles (1415), and Defensorium donationis ecclesiasticae, a work in defence of the donation of Constantine. At the request of Richard Courtenay he wrote a treatise, De officio militari ("On the military office"), addressed to Henry, Prince of Wales.

From 1403, Ullerston held the prebend of Oxford in Salisbury Cathedral, and from 1407 the rectory of Beeford in Yorkshire.

== Bibliography ==
- "Ullerston, Richard" . Dictionary of National Biography. London: Smith, Elder & Co. 1885–1900.
- Hibbert, Christopher, ed. (1988). The Encyclopaedia of Oxford. Macmillan. ISBN 0-333-39917-X.
- Ullerston's Petitiones quoad reformationem ecclesiae: http://web.wlu.ca/history/cnighman/cc/Petitiones.pdf

Academic offices
Preceded by John Ashwardby	Vice-Chancellor of the University of Oxford; 1394–1396	Succeeded by Nicholas Faux
Preceded by Richard Courtenay	Chancellor of the University of Oxford; 1407–1408	Succeeded by William Clynt
