= John de Hotham =

English college head and university chancellor

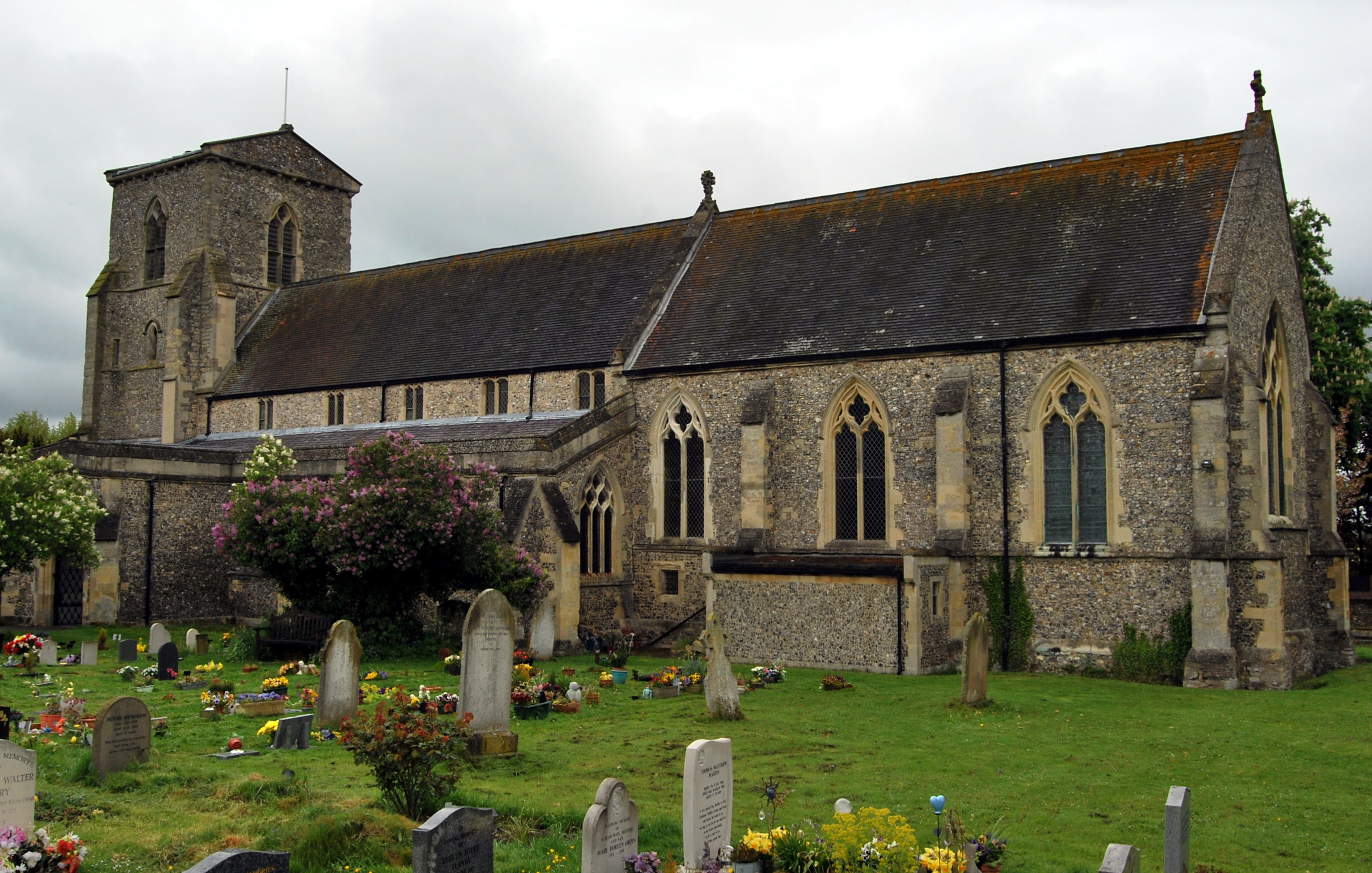
St Andrew's parish church in Chinnor, Oxfordshire, where John de Hotham was buried.

John de Hotham (or Hodum; died 1361) was an English medieval college head and university chancellor.

John de Hotham was Provost of The Queen's College, Oxford, from 1350 to 1361. He was for two periods Chancellor of the University of Oxford between 1357 and 1360. He was buried at Chinnor in Oxfordshire, originally in the chancel of the church.

Academic offices
Preceded by William de Muskham	Provost of The Queen's College, Oxford; 1350–1361	Succeeded by Henry Whitfield
Preceded by Lewis Charlton? Humphrey de Cherlton	Chancellor of the University of Oxford; 1357–1358	Succeeded by John Renham
Preceded by John Renham	Chancellor of the University of Oxford; 1359–1360	Succeeded by Richard FitzRalph
