= Robert Rygge =

English churchman and university Chancellor

Robert Rygge (a.k.a. Rugge) (died 1410) was an English medieval churchman, college fellow, and university Chancellor, and archdeacon of Barnstaple in Devon.

Rygge was at Exeter College, Oxford, later a Fellow of Merton College, and four times Chancellor of the University of Oxford between 1381 and 1392. He was a Doctor of Divinity and Canon of Exeter. Rygge was later the Archdeacon of Barnstaple from 1399 to 1400.

There is some confusion about whether there was a William Rygge (or Rugge) as Chancellor of Oxford University in 1382, but it is likely that this was the same person as Robert Rygge.

Academic offices
Preceded by William Berton	Chancellor of the University of Oxford; 1381–1382	Succeeded by William Berton
Preceded by William Berton	Chancellor of the University of Oxford; 1382	Succeeded by Nicholas Hereford
Preceded by William Rugge? or Nicholas Hereford	Chancellor of the University of Oxford; 1383–1388	Succeeded by Thomas Brightwell
Preceded by Thomas Cranley	Chancellor of the University of Oxford; 1391–1392	Succeeded by Ralph Redruth
