= List of chancellors of the University of Oxford =

List of chancellors at Oxford University

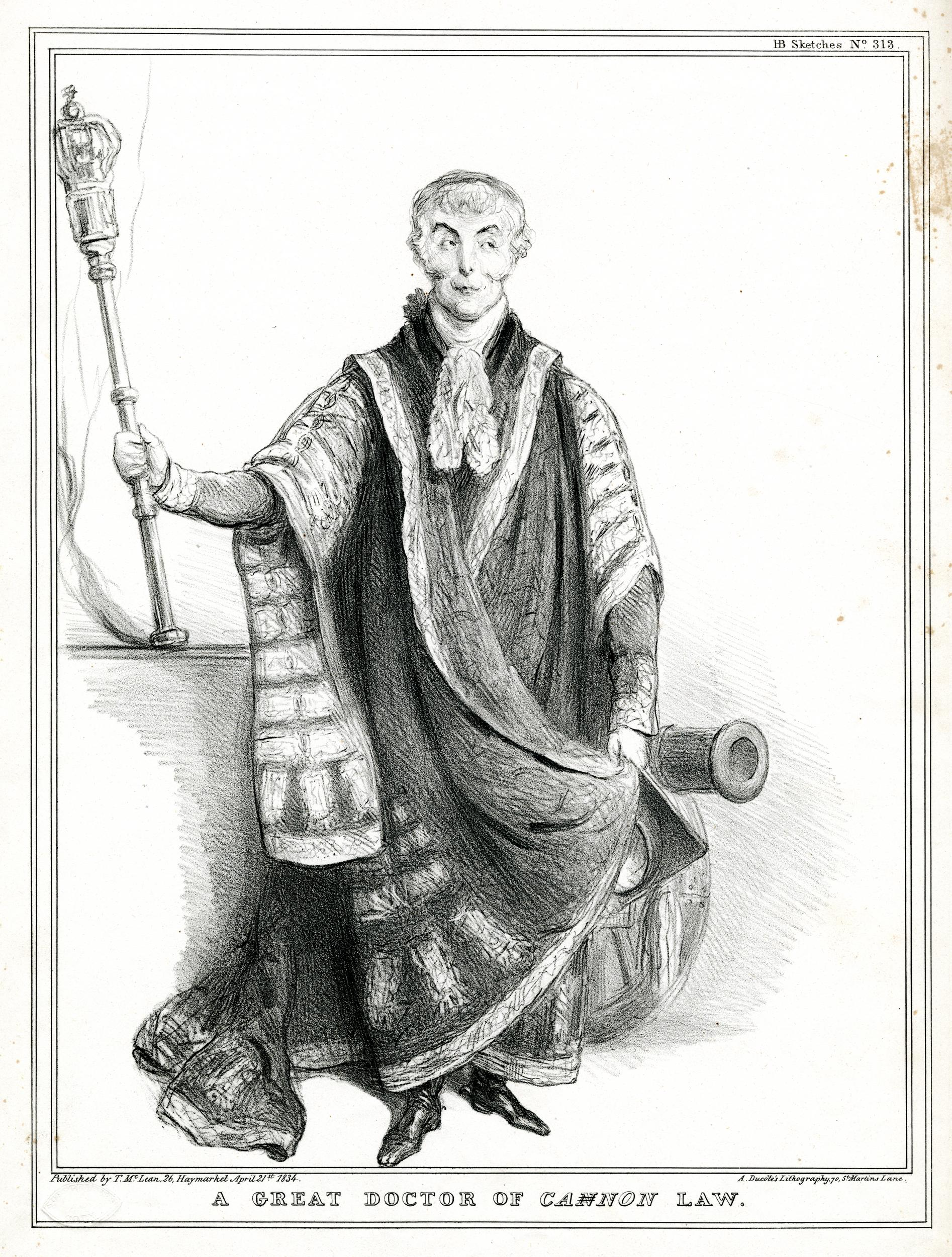
Cartoon of Arthur Wellesley, 1st Duke of Wellington, in the robes of the Chancellor of the University of Oxford. Punning on his military past and the Doctor of Canon Law degree, the caption calls him "a great doctor of cannon law."

The chancellor of the University of Oxford is the ceremonial head of the university. The office dates from the 13th century.

== Chronological list ==
Year	Chancellor
1224	Robert Grosseteste (Master of the School of Oxford since 1208)
1231	Ralph Cole (surname queried)
1231	Ralph of Maidstone
1231	Richard Batchden
1233	Ralph Cole
1238	Simon de Bovill
1239	John de Rygater
1240	Richard of Chichester
1240	Ralph de Heyham
1244	Simon de Bovill
1246	Gilbert de Biham
1252	Ralph de Sempringham
1255	William de Lodelawe
1256	Richard de S. Agatha
1262	Thomas de Cantilupe
1264	Henry de Cicestre ?
1267	Nicholas de Ewelme
1269	Thomas Bek
1273	William de Bosco
1276	Eustace de Normanville
1280	John of Pontoise
1280	Henry de Stanton
1282	William de Montfort
1283	Roger de Rowell or Rodwell or Rodewell
1284	William Pikerell
1285	Hervey de Saham
1288	Robert Winchelsey
1289	William de Kingescote
1290	John de Ludlow
1290	John of Monmouth
1291	Simon of Ghent
1292	Henry Swayne ?
1293	Roger de Martival
1294	Peter de Medburn
1294	Roger de Weseham
1297	Richard de Clyve
1300	James de Cobeham
1302	Walter de Wetheringsete
1304	Simon de Faversham
1306	Walter Burdun
1308	William de Bosco
1309	Henry de Maunsfeld
1311	Walter Giffard
1311	Henry de Maunsfeld
1313	Henry Harclay
1316	Richard de Nottingham ?
1317	John Lutterell
1322	Henry Gower
1324	William de Alburwyke
1326	Thomas Hotham
1328	Ralph of Shrewsbury
1329	Roger de Streton
1330	Nigel de Wavere
1332	Ralph Radyn
1334	Hugh de Willoughby
1335	Robert de Stratford (Bishop of Chichester and Lord Chancellor from 1337)
1338	Robert Paynink ?
1338	John Leech
1339	William de Skelton
1341	Walter de Scauren
1341	William de Bergeveney
1345	John de Northwode
1349	William de Hawkesworth
1350	William de Palmorna (1350–1351)
1354	Humphrey de Cherlton
1357	Lewis Charlton ?
1357	John de Hotham
1358	John Renham or Reigham
1359	John de Hotham
1360	Richard Fitz Ralph ?
1360	Nicholas de Aston
1363	John de Renham
1363	John de Echingham or Hethingham
1366	Adam de Toneworth
1367	William Courtney
1369	Adam de Toneworth
1371	William de Heytisbury
1372	William de Remmyngton
1373	William de Wylton
1376	John Turke
1377	Adam de Toneworth
1379	Robert Aylesham
1379	William Berton
1381	Robert Rygge or Rugge
1382	William Berton
1382	Robert Rygge
1382	Nicholas Hereford
1382	William Rugge ?
1383	Robert Rygge
1388	Thomas Brightwell
1390	Thomas Cranley
1391	Robert Rygge
1392	Ralph Redruth
1393	Thomas Prestbury
1394	Robert Arlyngton
1395	Thomas Hyndeman
1397	Philip Repyngdon
1397	Henry Beaufort (Bishop of Lincoln from 1398)
1399	Thomas Hyndeman
1400	Philip Repyngdon
1403	Robert Alum or Hallam
1407	Richard Courtenay
1407	Richard Ullerston
1408	William Clynt
1409	Thomas Prestbury
1410	William Sulburge
1411	Richard Courtenay
1412	William Sulburge
1412	Richard Courtenay
1413	William Sulburge
1413	William Barrow
1414	Richard Snetisham
1415	William Barrow
1416	Thomas Clare
1416	William Barrow
1417	Thomas Clare
1417	Walter Treugof
1419	Robert Colman
1419	Walter Treugof
1420	Thomas Rodborne
1420	Walter Treugof
1421	John Castell
1426	Thomas Chase
1431	Gilbert Kymer
1433	Thomas Bourchier (Bishop of Worcester from 1434)
1437	John Carpenter
1438	Richard Praty or Pratty ?
1439	John Norton
1440	Richard Roderham
1440	William Grey
1442	Thomas Gascoigne
1442	Henry Sever
1443	Thomas Gascoigne
1445	Robert Thwaits
1446	Gilbert Kymer
1453	George Neville
1457	Thomas Chaundeler
1461	George Neville (Lord Chancellor; Archbishop of York from 1465)
1472	Thomas Chaundeler
1479	Lionel Woodville (Bishop of Salisbury from 1482)
1483	William Dudley
1483	John Russell
1494	John Morton (Archbishop of Canterbury; Lord Chancellor)
1500	William Smyth
1502	Richard Mayew (Bishop of Hereford from 1504)
1506	William Warham
1532	John Longland (Bishop of Lincoln)
1547	Richard Cox
1552	John Mason
1556	Cardinal Reginald Pole (Archbishop of Canterbury)
1558	Henry FitzAlan, 19th Earl of Arundel
1559	John Mason
1564	Robert Dudley, 1st Earl of Leicester
1585	Sir Thomas Bromley, (deputising for the Earl of Leicester)
1588	Sir Christopher Hatton
1591	Thomas Sackville, 1st Baron Buckhurst (Earl of Dorset from 1604)
1608	Richard Bancroft
1610	Thomas Egerton, 1st Baron Ellesmere (Viscount Brackley from 1616)
1616	William Herbert, 3rd Earl of Pembroke
1630	William Laud
1641	Philip Herbert, 4th Earl of Pembroke
1643	William Seymour, 2nd Duke of Somerset
1648–1650	Philip Herbert, 4th Earl of Pembroke (died in office)
1650	Oliver Cromwell
1657	Richard Cromwell
1660	William Seymour, 2nd Duke of Somerset, reinstated after the Restoration
1660	Edward Hyde, 1st Earl of Clarendon
1667	Gilbert Sheldon
1669	James Butler, 1st Duke of Ormonde
1688	James Butler, 2nd Duke of Ormonde
1715	Charles Butler, 1st Earl of Arran
1759	John Fane, 7th Earl of Westmorland
1762	George Lee, 3rd Earl of Lichfield
1772	Frederick North, Lord North (Earl of Guilford from 1790)
1792	William Cavendish-Bentinck, 3rd Duke of Portland
1809	William Grenville, 1st Baron Grenville
1834	Arthur Wellesley, 1st Duke of Wellington
1852	Edward Smith-Stanley, 14th Earl of Derby
1869	Robert Gascoyne-Cecil, 3rd Marquess of Salisbury
1903	George Goschen, 1st Viscount Goschen
1907	George Curzon, 1st Baron Curzon of Kedleston (Earl Curzon of Kedleston from 1911; Marquess Curzon of Kedleston from 1921)
1925	George Cave, 1st Viscount Cave
1928	Edward Grey, 1st Viscount Grey of Fallodon
1933	Edward Wood, 1st Baron Irwin (Viscount Halifax from 1934; Earl of Halifax from 1944)
1960	Harold Macmillan (Earl of Stockton from 1984)
1987	Roy Jenkins (Baron Jenkins of Hillhead from 1987)
2003	Chris Patten (Baron Patten of Barnes from 2005)
2025	William Hague, Baron Hague of Richmond

== See also ==
- 2024 University of Oxford Chancellor election
- List of vice-chancellors of the University of Oxford
- List of University of Oxford people
- List of chancellors of the University of Cambridge
