= Robert Aylesham =

English medieval university vice-chancellor and chancellor

Robert Aylesham (died c. September 1379) was an English medieval university vice-chancellor and chancellor.

Aylesham was at Merton College, Oxford and became Vice-Chancellor of the University of Oxford in 1377. He became Chancellor of the university in 1379. He died around September in the year he was appointed Chancellor.

== Bibliography ==
- Hibbert, Christopher, ed. (1988). The Encyclopaedia of Oxford. Macmillan. ISBN 0-333-39917-X.

Academic offices
Preceded by John de Codeford	Vice-Chancellor of the University of Oxford; 1377	Succeeded by Peter Stokes
Preceded by Adam de Toneworth	Chancellor of the University of Oxford; 1379	Succeeded by William Berton
