= John de Echingham =

English university chancellor

John de Echingham S.T.D. (fl. 1348, died 1371) was an English medieval Chancellor of the University of Oxford, who held that dignity for three consecutive years.

== Family ==
The Echyngham family, seated at Etchingham in Sussex, traced an unbroken descent in the male line from Drew of Pevensey, heir of Reinbert (Steward to the Count of Eu during the reign of Henry I), and were the hereditary Stewards of the Rape of Hastings and from time to time sheriffs of Sussex. Of this stem Sir William de Echyngham, a patron of (and sometimes disputant with) Robertsbridge Abbey, died possessed of extensive estates in 1294, leaving as his heir his eldest son Sir William, then aged 28 and recently married to Eva, daughter of Ralph de Stopham.

After a distinguished military and parliamentary career this younger William died in 1326, and, having no male issue, was succeeded by his brother Robert. Robert was with Edmund of Woodstock in Aquitaine in 1324, and was sent to England to warn King Edward of the threatened invasion of the Duchy. Robert in turn died without issue in 1329, and the inheritance passed to his brother Simon de Echyngham, rector of Herstmonceux, who, being a cleric, also had no known issue. Here, perhaps, the name of Echyngham might have been extinguished, save that the fourth brother, Richard, who did not live to inherit the lordship, left by his wife Matilda three sons, James, Robert and John, and a daughter Petronilla. William had settled an estate in Kent upon Richard and his heirs at Michaelmas 1314, for the annual rent of one pair of gilded spurs.

The later Lords of Echyngham were the posterity of Sir James who, so early as 1324, had received a grant of land in Benenden, Kent witnessed by his three uncles, the Lords William, Simon and Robert. He married Joan (perhaps de Akeni), by whom he had a son and heir William, and by 1342 took up the reins of the Echyngham inheritance through the 1340s, dying in August 1349 when William was 16 years old. It was Sir James's younger brother John de Echyngham son of Richard and Matilda de Echyngham, who became Chancellor of the University of Oxford.

== Career ==
In 1348 John de Echyngham graduated M.A. from the University of Oxford, and in June 1349 he was presented by John de Ore, of a gentry family neighbouring the Echynghams, to their benefice of Wodeton (Wotton), Sussex. In November of the same year Master John de Echyngham, clerk, acknowledged that he owed £80 to Bartholomew de Burghersh the elder. His nephew Sir William, meanwhile, took up his heredity as Lord of Echyngham, and, a few years later, embarked on his reconstruction of the church at Etchingham with its informative heraldic glazing, where the Echyngham monuments have for 600 years remained.

In 1357, when Echyngham had further attained a Bachelor's degree in Theology, the Archbishop of Canterbury Simon Islip collated him to the Deanery of the Collegiate church of South Malling (near Lewes, and in the Diocese of Canterbury), when that office became void by the death of John de Aylesbury. The appointment, which had the value of 60 marks (£40), received Papal confirmation in May. Five years later, in 1362, he received from Pope Urban V the grant of a canonry, with the expectation of a prebend, of St Paul's in London, to be held together with his deanery of Malling.

Sir William de Echyngham was associated with his uncle John, "clericus", in February 1362/63 in a fine to enfeoff Robert de Ore with the principal manors and advowson of the Echyngham lordship, together with more than a thousand acres of woodland and various rents. Robert thereby returned the whole premises to the said William and John, the entailed fine stating how the estate was to pass to William's male descendants, or (if he had none) to those of one of his brothers, John, Robert or Richard. In the event William died in 1388 leaving male descendants of his own.

Chancellor

In June 1363, when he is described as "doctor sacrae theologie", Echyngham began his term as Chancellor of the University of Oxford. In this first year his Proctors were Richard Sutton of Merton College and Walter Wandesford of Oriel College: and in the second year Wandesford continued but Sutton was succeeded by Walter Remmesbury (who later became Cantor of Hereford Cathedral). Wood notes that there are two letters by Echyngham to King Edward III concerning the arrest of an excommunicated person, and that his letters are referred to in Anthony Fitzherbert's La Novelle Natura Brevium concerning the privileges of the university. He was again Chancellor for the third consecutive year in 1365.

Last years

Sir Andrew de Sakeville (Sheriff of Surrey and Sussex, 1367–1368) in 1365 had licence to enfeoff Master John de Echyngham and three other clerics with an estate of 301 acres held in chief in Pevensey, so that they should regrant it to him with a specified entail. In 1366, here described as Doctor of Theology, Echingham had already surrendered the Chancellorship when he made petition for the enlargement of his grant of a canonry with expectation of a prebend, so as to include an elective dignity or office with cure of souls. Noticing that he still held the Deanery of South Malling, he declared himself willing to resign it. This petition was granted. The register of Archbishop William Whittlesey records that Dr Echyngham died in 1371, the same folio recording the appointment of his successor John Pateney at South Malling.

Academic offices
Preceded by John de Renham	Chancellor of the University of Oxford; 1363–1366	Succeeded by Adam de Toneworth
