= Nicholas de Aston =

English medieval college fellow and university chancellor

Nicholas de Aston was an English medieval college fellow and university chancellor.

Nicholas de Aston was at The Queen's College, Oxford and achieved a Doctor of Divinity degree. He was Chancellor of the University of Oxford between 1360 and 1363.

Academic offices
Preceded by Richard FitzRalph	Chancellor of the University of Oxford; 1360–1363	Succeeded by John de Renham
