= Ralph Radyn =

English theologian and university chancellor

Ralph Radyn DD (a.k.a. Radulph Radyn) was an English medieval theologian and university chancellor.

Radyn achieved a Doctor of Divinity degree. Between 1332 and 1334, he was Chancellor of Oxford University.

Academic offices
Preceded by Nigel de Wavere	Chancellor of the University of Oxford; 1332–1334	Succeeded by Hugh de Willoughby
