= John Renham =

English university chancellor

John Renham (or Reigham) was an English medieval university chancellor.

Renham was chancellor of the University of Oxford between 1358 and 1359. He may also have served as chancellor of the university in 1363.

Academic offices
Preceded by John de Hotham	Chancellor of the University of Oxford; 1358–1359	Succeeded by John de Hotham
Preceded by Nicholas de Aston	Chancellor of the University of Oxford; 1363	Succeeded by John de Echingham
