= Henry Beaufort =

English bishop and statesman (1375–1447)

- Cardinal, Bishop of Winchester
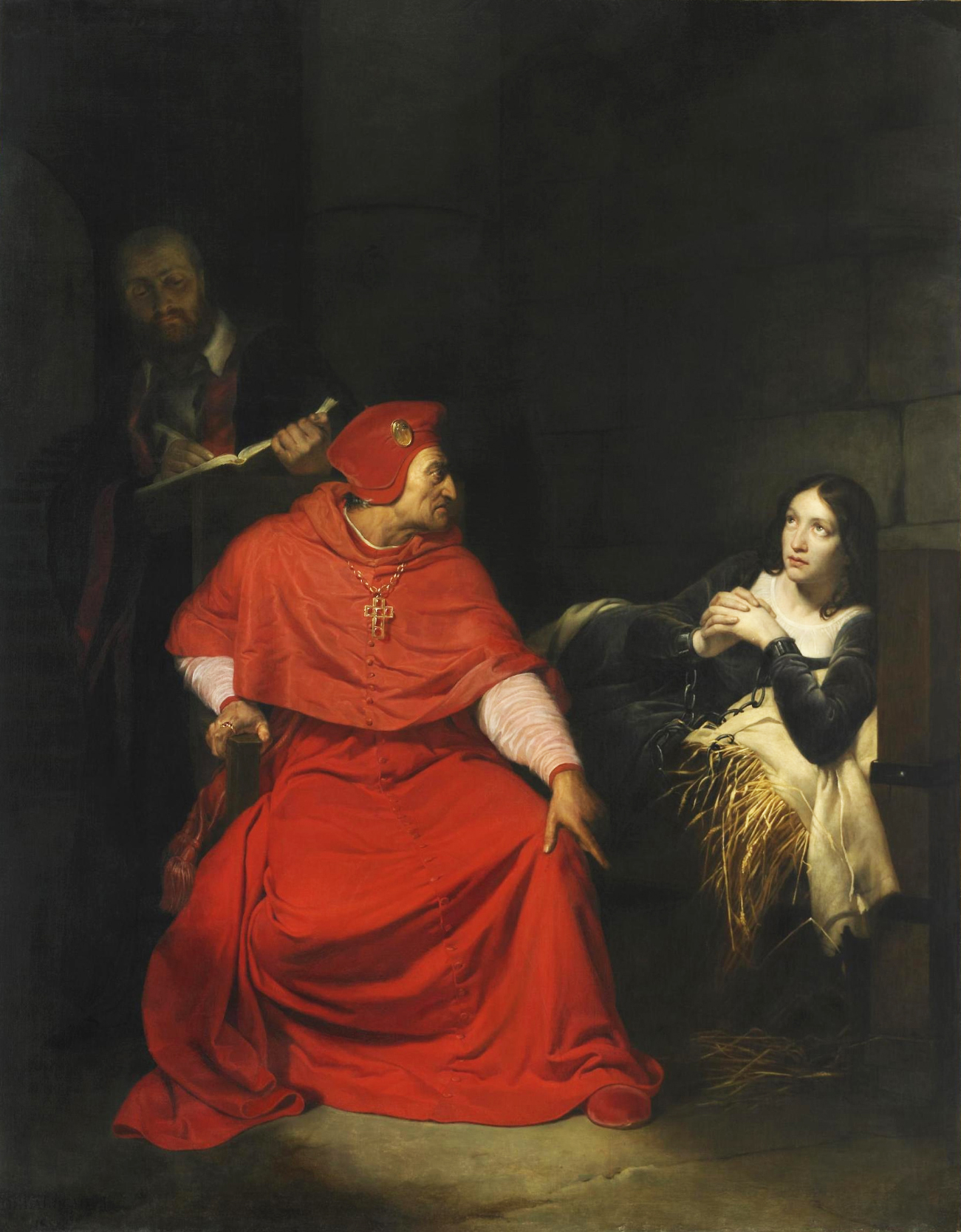
- 1856 painting by Paul Delaroche showing Beaufort interrogating Joan of Arc in prison
- Church: Roman Catholic Church
- Province: Canterbury
- Diocese: Winchester
- Installed: 1404
- Term ended: 1447
- Predecessor: William of Wykeham
- Successor: William Waynflete
- Other posts: Lord Chancellor of England; Cardinal Priest of Sant'Eusebio
- Previous posts: Bishop of Lincoln (1398–1404); Chancellor of Oxford University (1397–99); Dean of Wells (1397–98)

Orders
- Consecration: 14 July 1398
- Created cardinal: 24 May 1426 by Pope Martin V
- Rank: Cardinal Priest

Personal details
- Born: c. 1375 Château de Beaufort, Anjou, Kingdom of France
- Died: 11 April 1447 (aged 71–72) Wolvesey Castle, Winchester, Kingdom of England
- Buried: Winchester Cathedral
- Denomination: Catholic Church
- Parents: John of Gaunt and Katherine Swynford
- Coat of arms

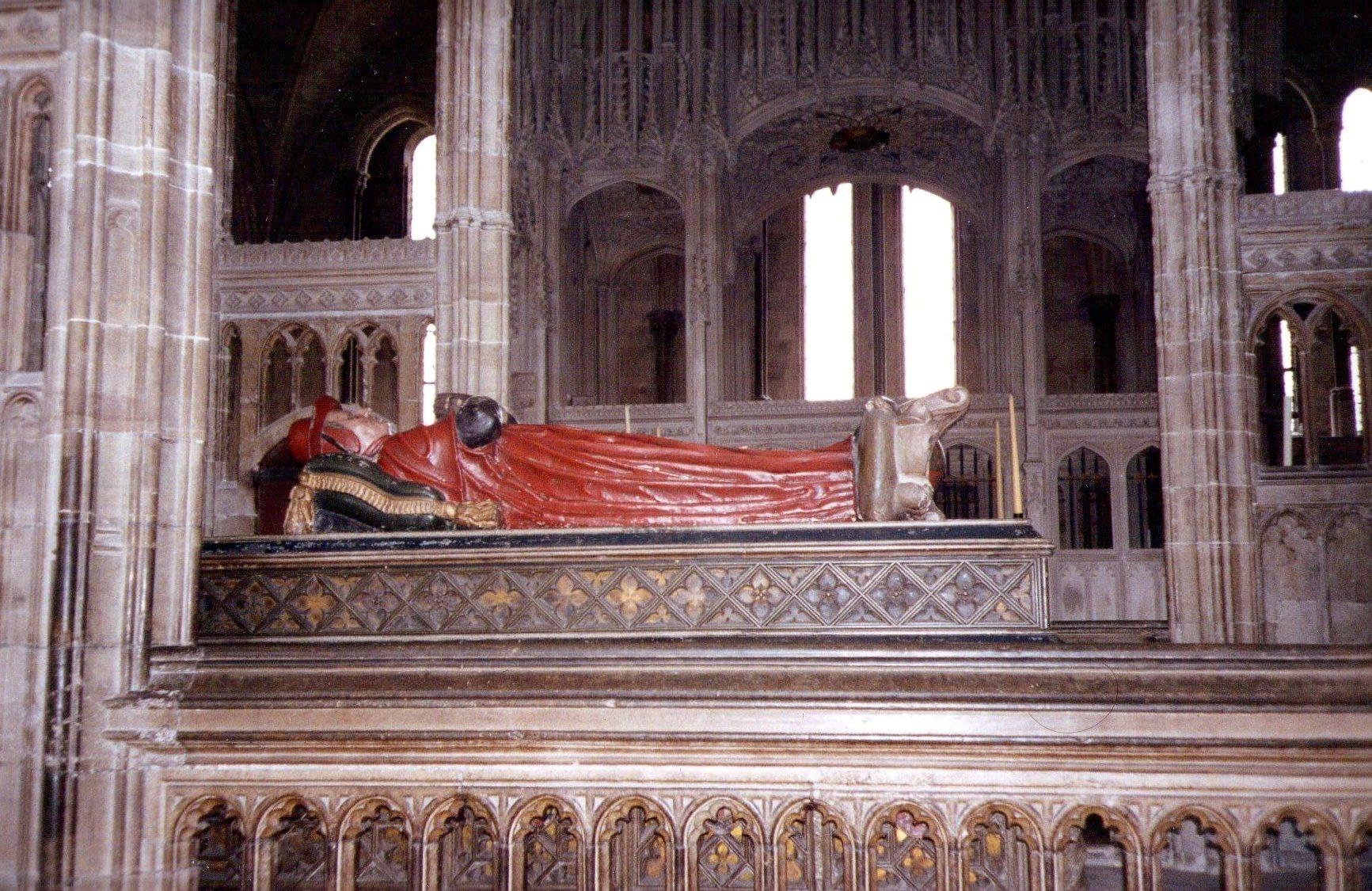
Beaufort's tomb in Winchester Cathedral

Henry Beaufort (c. 1375 – 11 April 1447) was an English Catholic prelate and statesman who held the offices of Bishop of Lincoln (1398), Bishop of Winchester (1404) and cardinal (1426). He served three times as Lord Chancellor and played an important role in English politics.

Beaufort was a member of the royal House of Plantagenet, being the second son of the four legitimised children of John of Gaunt (third son of King Edward III) by his mistress (later wife) Katherine Swynford.

== Life ==
Beaufort is often claimed to have been born at Beaufort, an English domain in France, but England, John of Gaunt specifically, had already lost that land holding, which had come to him through Blanche of Artois, great-grandmother of his first wife Blanche of Lancaster. He was educated for a career in the Church. After his parents were married in early 1396, Henry, his two brothers and one sister were declared legitimate by Pope Boniface IX and a royal proclamation read in Parliament on 9 February 1397.

On 27 February 1398, he was nominated Bishop of Lincoln, and on 14 July 1398, he was consecrated. After Henry of Bolingbroke deposed Richard II and took the throne as Henry IV in 1399, he made Bishop Beaufort Lord Chancellor of England in 1403, but Beaufort resigned in 1404 when he was appointed Bishop of Winchester on 19 November.

Between 1411 and 1413, Bishop Beaufort was in political disgrace for siding with his nephew, the Prince of Wales, against the king, but when King Henry IV died and the prince became King Henry V, he was made Chancellor once again in 1413, but he resigned the position in 1417. Pope Martin V offered him the rank of Cardinal, but King Henry V would not permit him to accept the offer.

Henry V died in 1422, two years after he had married Catherine of Valois, daughter of King Charles VI, who had disowned his son Charles in favour of Henry in the Treaty of Troyes. Henry and Catherine's infant son Henry VI, the Bishop's great-nephew, succeeded Henry as King of England, and, in accordance with the Treaty, succeeded Charles as King of France. Bishop Beaufort and the child king's other uncles formed the Regency government, and in 1424, Beaufort became Chancellor once more, but was forced to resign in 1426 because of disputes with the king's other uncles, in particular Humphrey, Duke of Gloucester.

Pope Martin V finally appointed Beaufort as Cardinal in 1426. In 1427, he made him the Papal Legate for Germany, Hungary and Bohemia, and directed him to lead the fourth "crusade" against the Hussites heretics in Bohemia. Beaufort's forces were routed by the Hussites at the Battle of Tachov on 4 August 1427.

After the capture of Joan of Arc in 1431, legend has it that Beaufort was present to observe some of the heresy trial sessions presided over by Bishop Pierre Cauchon of Beauvais. However, the full record of the trial, which lists all those who took part in her trial on a daily basis shows that he was not there. His sole appearance is on the day of her abjuration (26 May 1431). The formal record does not include Beaufort's presence at her execution but legend has it that he wept as he viewed the horrible scene as she was burned at the stake. This legend derives from what is now known as the Rehabilitation Trial of Joan of Arc which culminated in an examination of numerous witnesses in 1455 and 1456 in which one of the 27 Articles of Enquiry was that Joan had died in "such a manner as to draw from all those present, and even from her English enemies, effusions of tears." A number of witnesses at this re-trial inferred or declared his presence including one of the original trial judges, one Andre Marguerie, Canon of Rouen, who asserted that Beaufort had reprimanded his chaplain for complaining that the Bishop of Beauvais's sermon was too favourable to Joan. However, it is not clear to which sermon Marguerie was referring.

In a spirit of contrition and reconciliation, in 1922 a statue of Joan of Arc (carved under the supervision of Sir Ninian Comper) was placed beside the entrance to the Lady Chapel in Winchester Cathedral diagonally facing Cardinal Beaufort's tomb and chantry chapel.

Beaufort continued to be active in English politics for years, fighting with the other powerful advisors to the king. He died on 11 April 1447.

== Affair and daughter ==
When Henry was Bishop of Lincoln, he had an illegitimate daughter, Jane Beaufort, with an unknown woman, sometimes thought to be the daughter of Alice Cherleton, Baroness Cherleton: "Henry fathered an illegitimate daughter, Jane Beaufort, in 1402, who some make Alice's daughter. Both Jane and her husband, Sir Edward Stradling, were named in Cardinal Beaufort's will. Their marriage about 1423 brought Sir Edward into the political orbit of his shrewd and assertive father-in-law, to whom he may have owed his appointment as chamberlain of South Wales in December 1423, a position he held until March 1437".

== Citations ==
Political offices
Preceded by Edmund Stafford	Lord Chancellor; 1403–1405	Succeeded by Thomas Langley
Preceded by Thomas Arundel	Lord Chancellor; 1413–1417	Succeeded by Thomas Langley
Preceded by Thomas Langley	Lord Chancellor; 1424–1426	Succeeded by John Kemp
Catholic Church titles
Preceded by Thomas Thebaud	Dean of Wells; 1397–1398	Succeeded by Nicholas Slake
Preceded by John Bokyngham	Bishop of Lincoln; 1398–1404	Succeeded by Philip Repyngdon
Preceded by William of Wykeham	Bishop of Winchester; 1404–1447	Succeeded by William Waynflete
Preceded by Alemanno Adimari	Cardinal Priest of S. Eusebio; 1426–1447	Succeeded by Richard Olivier de Longueil
Academic offices
Preceded by Philip Repyngdon	Chancellor of the University of Oxford; 1397–1399	Succeeded by Thomas Hyndeman
