= Adam de Toneworth =

English university chancellor

Adam de Toneworth (also Toueworth or Towworth) was an English medieval university chancellor.

Adam de Toneworth was Chancellor of the University of Oxford several times between 1366 and 1379. As Chancellor of Oxford, he was involved with the John Wycliffe controversy.

Academic offices
Preceded by John de Echingham	Chancellor of the University of Oxford; 1366–1367	Succeeded by William Courtenay
Preceded by William Courtenay	Chancellor of the University of Oxford; 1369–1371	Succeeded by William de Heytisbury
Preceded by John Turke	Chancellor of the University of Oxford; 1377–1379	Succeeded by Robert Aylesham
