= William de Bergeveney =

English judge and university chancellor

William de Bergeveney DD (or Bergevenny) was an English medieval judge and university chancellor.

Between 1341 and 1345, William de Bergeveney was Chancellor of the University of Oxford. He was a Doctor of Divinity.

William de Bergeveney was named in a Papal Bull as being involved as a judge in a case of the Prior and brethren of St Augustine the Eremite involving the Diocese of Norwich.

Academic offices
Preceded by Walter de Scauren	Chancellor of the University of Oxford; 1341–1345	Succeeded by John de Northwode
