= William de Skelton =

English college fellow and university chancellor

William de Skelton was an English college fellow and university chancellor.

William de Skelton was a Fellow of Merton College, Oxford. Between 1339 and 1341, he was Chancellor of the University of Oxford.

Academic offices
Preceded by John Leech	Chancellor of the University of Oxford; 1339–1341	Succeeded by Walter de Scauren
