= John Ashwardby =

John Ashwardby (fl. 1392) was a follower of John Wycliffe.

Ashwardby is described by Tanner, probably by an inference from his surname, as coming from Lincolnshire, England. He became a Fellow of Oriel College, Oxford, 'master of theology,' and vicar of St Mary's church.

Attaching himself to Wycliffe's group, Ashwardby appears to have been active in preaching, lecturing, and writing, as an opponent specially of the mendicant orders, and he engaged in controversy with the Carmelite, Richard Maydeston, a chaplain of John of Gaunt. In spite of this, however, he filled the office of 'commissary' or Vice-Chancellor of Oxford University in 1391.

Academic offices
Preceded by John Lyndon	Vice-Chancellor of the University of Oxford; 1391–1394	Succeeded by Richard Ullerston
