= William Clynt =

English singer and university Chancellor

William Clynt DD (died 17 February 1424) was an English medieval cathedral singer, college Fellow, and university Chancellor.

Clynt was a Fellow of Merton College, Oxford and Chancellor of the University of Oxford during 1408–09. He was Chantor (chief singer) at Lincoln Cathedral and was buried at Lincoln inside the cathedral.

Academic offices
Preceded by Richard Ullerston	Chancellor of the University of Oxford; 1409–1409	Succeeded by Thomas Prestbury
