= William de Remmyngton =

English monk and university chancellor

- Other names: William de Remmington, William Remmington
- Occupations: Cistercian monk, University chancellor
- Known for: Chancellor of the University of Oxford (1372–1373)
- Predecessor: William de Heytisbury
- Successor: William de Wylton

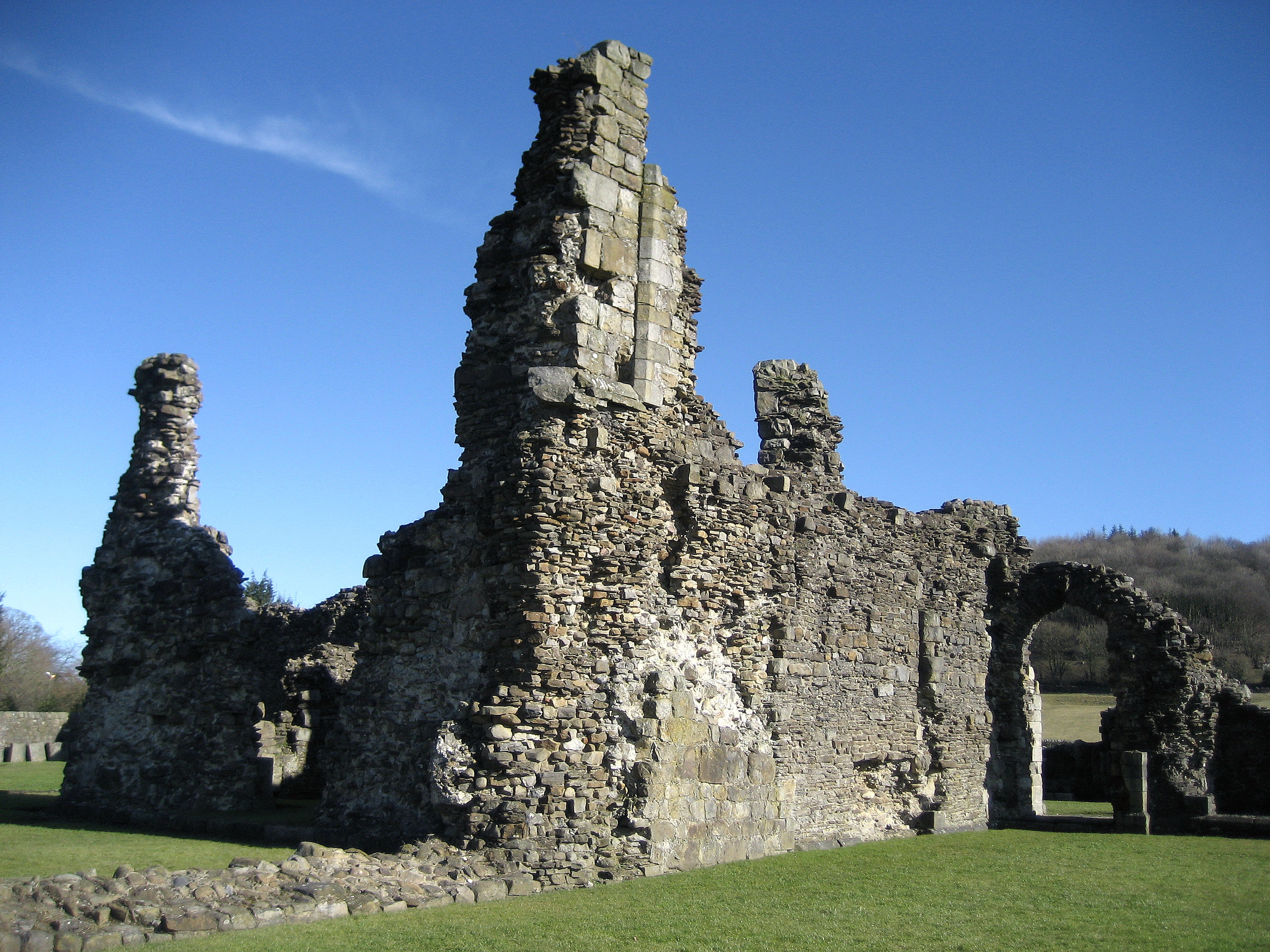
The remains of Sawley Abbey, historically in Yorkshire and now in Lancashire, where William de Remmyngton was a Cistercian monk.

William de Remmyngton (also Remmington) was an English medieval monk and university chancellor.

William de Remmyngton was a Cistercian monk at Sawley Abbey, then in the West Riding of Yorkshire. He was Chancellor of the University of Oxford between 1372 and 1373. He was opposed to John Wycliffe at Oxford.

Academic offices
Preceded by William de Heytisbury	Chancellor of the University of Oxford; 1372–1373	Succeeded by William de Wylton
