= Robert Alyngton =

English philosopher

Robert Alyngton (died September 1398) was an English philosopher who developed new logical, semantic, metaphysical, and ontological theories in 14th century thought. Alyngton is credited with creating the ideological foundation for the Oxford realists by substituting reference to objective reality with reference to mental and linguistic reality.

== Career ==
Alyngton was a Fellow of The Queen's College, Oxford from 1379 until 1386. He was deeply influenced by the metaphysics of John Wyclif who began his theological studies at Queen's College in 1363. Alyngton was Chancellor of Oxford University in 1394–5. He later became Rector of Long Whatton, Leicestershire, until his death 1398.

== Philosophical works ==
- Litteralis sententia super Praedicamenta Aristotelis – a commentary on Aristotle's Categories.
- Tractatus de suppositionibus terminorum – a treatise on the supposition of terms and philosophy of language.
- A commentary on the Liber sex principiorum.
- Tractatus generum – a treatise on the genera of being.

Academic offices
Preceded by Thomas Prestbury	Chancellor of the University of Oxford; 1394–1395	Succeeded by Thomas Hyndeman
