= Thomas Hyndeman =

English churchman and university chancellor

Thomas Hyndeman DD (a.k.a. Hendeman or Hendyman) was an English medieval churchman, college head, and university chancellor.

Hyndeman was a Fellow of Exeter College, Oxford and was Rector of the college from 16 October 1389 until 2 April 1390. He became Dean of Crantock in Cornwall on 8 December 1390. Hyndeman achieved the degree of Doctor of Divinity. He was twice Chancellor of the University of Oxford during 1394–1395 and 1399–1400.

Academic offices
Preceded by Thomas Dyre	Rector of Exeter College, Oxford; 1389–1390	Succeeded by Richard Mark
Preceded by Robert Arlyngton	Chancellor of the University of Oxford; 1394–1395	Succeeded by Philip Repyngdon
Preceded by Henry Beaufort	Chancellor of the University of Oxford; 1399–1400	Succeeded by Philip Repyngdon
