= 2003 University of Oxford Chancellor election =

- 14–15 March 2003
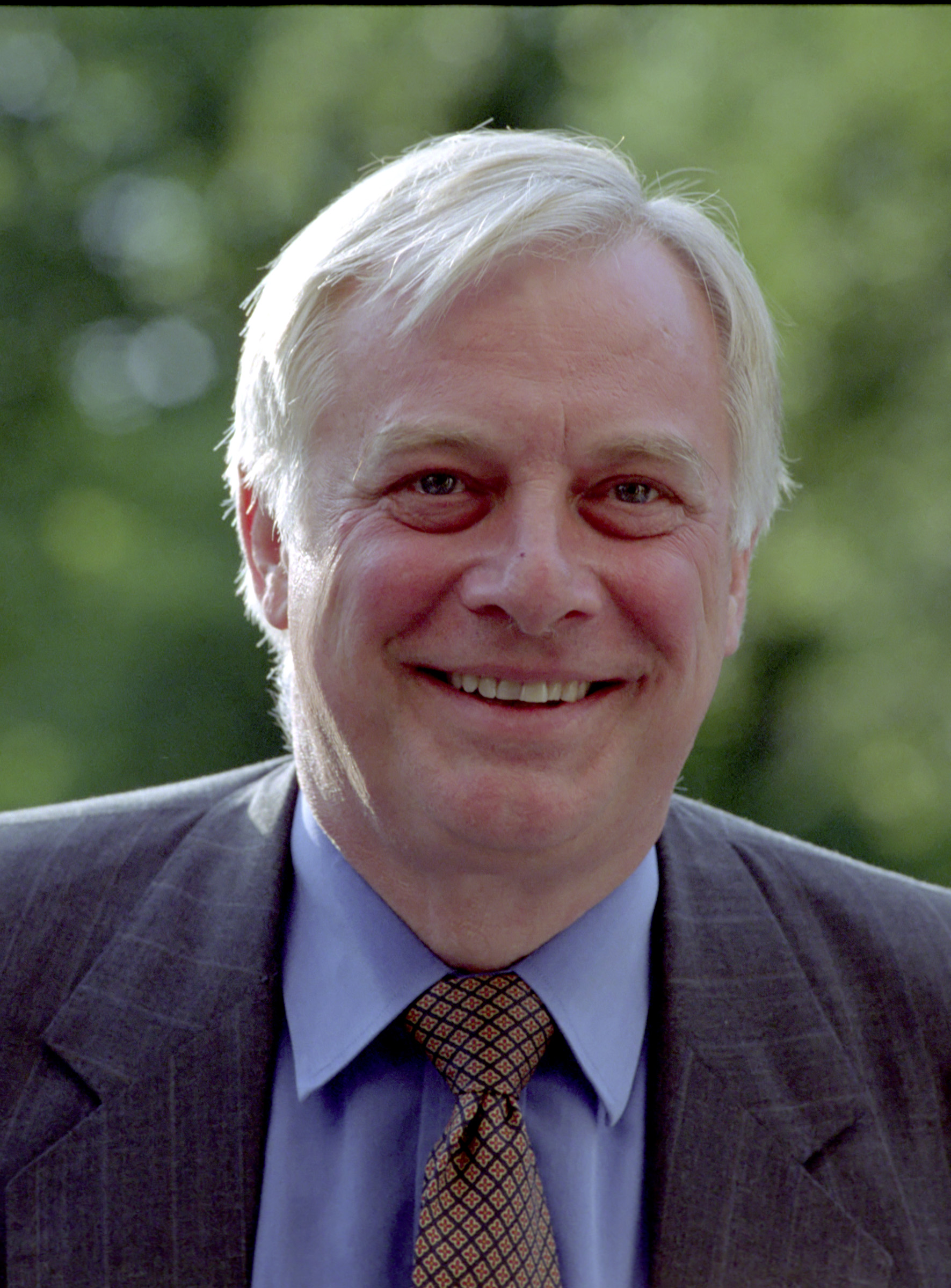

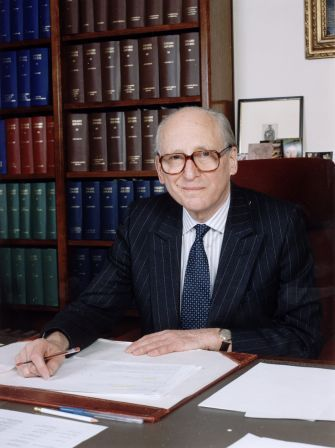

Candidate	Chris Patten	Lord Bingham of Cornhill	Lord Neill of Bladen
Party	Conservative	Independent	Crossbench
Second round	4,203 (51.5%)	2,483 (30.4%)	1,470 (18.0%)
Chancellor before election
Roy Jenkins
Elected Chancellor
Chris Patten

The 2003 University of Oxford election for the position of Chancellor was called upon the death of the incumbent Chancellor, Roy Jenkins, on 5 January 2003.

== Electorate ==
The electorate consisted of all members of the University holding the rank of MA. Votes had to be cast in person at Oxford. To stand, a candidate had to be nominated by two electors.

It was the first such election to be held in which voters were not required to wear academic dress to vote. It was also the first election to use the instant-runoff vote, after the previous election by first past the post in 1987 saw two Conservative candidates (Lord Blake and Sir Edward Heath) splitting the Conservative vote at 2,500 each, allowing Social Democrat Roy Jenkins to win with 3,500 votes.

== Candidates ==
Four candidates were nominated:

- Thomas Bingham, Baron Bingham of Cornhill, 69, senior Law Lord, former Lord Chief Justice and former Master of the Rolls
- Patrick Neill, Baron Neill of Bladen, 76, former Warden of All Souls, former Vice-Chancellor of Oxford University, and former Chairman of the Committee on Standards in Public Life
- Chris Patten, 58, incumbent European Commissioner for External Relations, former Conservative cabinet minister and last Governor of Hong Kong
- Sandi Toksvig, 44, stand-up comedian and broadcaster

== The campaign ==
For much of the race, Chris Patten was generally considered to be the front-runner, due to his high profile as the last Governor of Hong Kong. The bookmaker William Hill offered odds of 7/4 for Mr Patten, 9/4 for Lord Bingham, 11/4 for Lord Neill, and 3/1 for Toksvig.

Sandi Toksvig was the candidate most vociferously opposed to the government's proposed top-up fees, and so received the endorsement of the Oxford University Student Union. However, as most of the union's members were undergraduates, they did not have a vote in the election itself. Lord Neill also declared himself opposed to top-up fees, but said in his candidates' statement that he preferred not to make this the basis of his campaign.

== Result ==
Polling ran over two days, on 14 and 15 March 2003. The results went to two rounds before one candidate secured more than 50% of the vote.

Candidate	First round		Second round		
Candidate	Votes	%	Votes	±	%
Chris Patten	3,657	43.66	4,203	▲546	51.53
Lord Bingham of Cornhill	2,251	26.87	2,483	▲232	30.44
Lord Neill of Bladen	1,290	15.40	1,470	▲180	18.02
Sandi Toksvig	1,179	14.07	Eliminated		
Votes cast	8,377	100	8,156	▼221	

== See also ==
- List of chancellors of the University of Oxford
