= 1960 University of Oxford Chancellor election =

University elections

- 3 March 1960
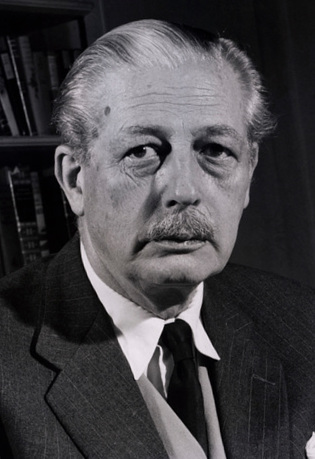

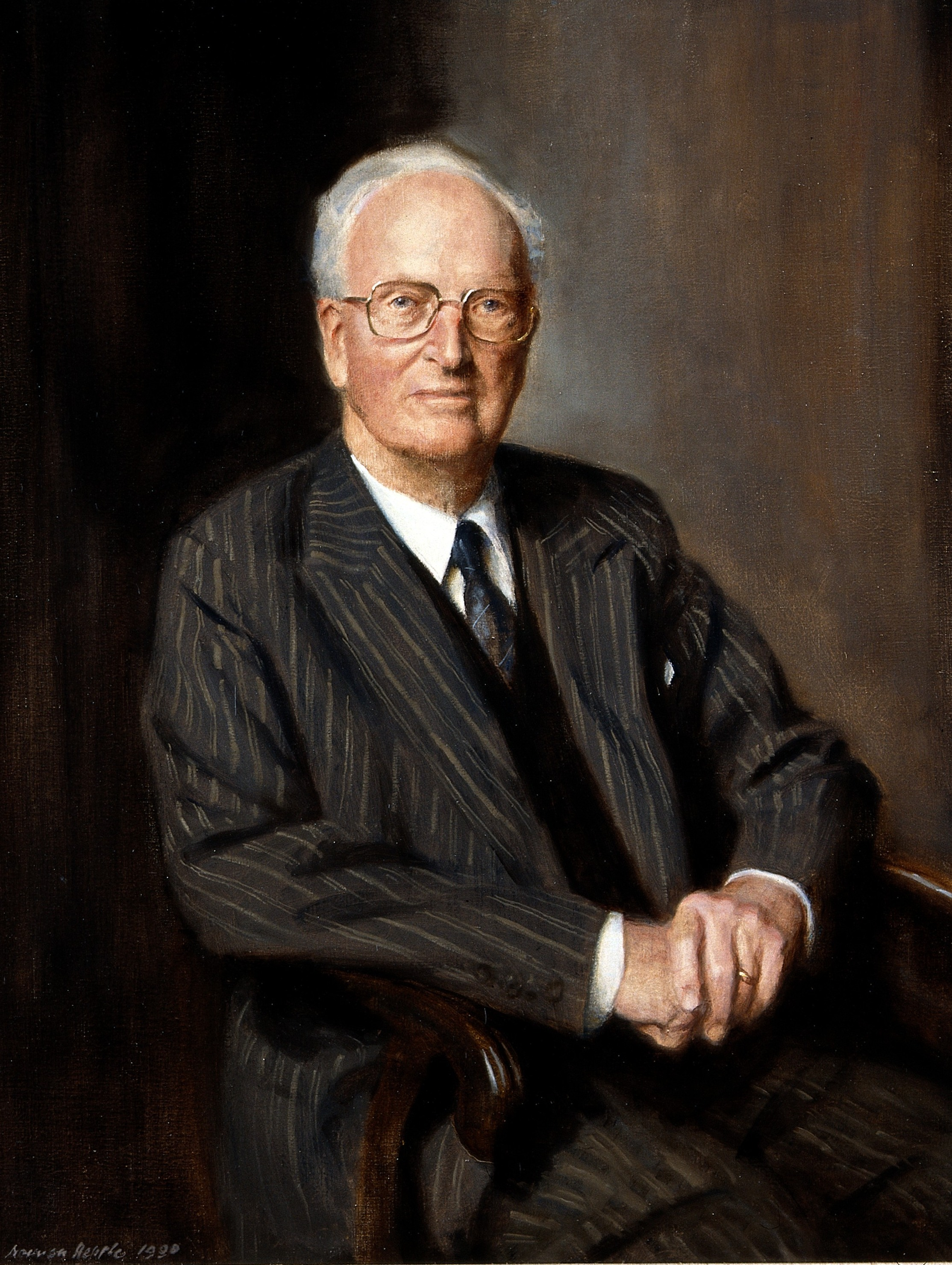
Candidate	Harold Macmillan	Sir Oliver Franks
Party	Conservative	Independent
Popular vote	1,976	1,697
Percentage	53.8%	46.2%
Chancellor before election
Edward Wood, 1st Earl of Halifax
Elected Chancellor
Harold Macmillan

The 1960 University of Oxford election for the position of Chancellor was called upon the death of the incumbent Chancellor, Lord Halifax, on 23 December 1959. It was the first election for Oxford Chancellor to be contested since 1925.

== Electorate ==
The electorate consisted of all members of the University holding the rank of Master of Arts, of which there were around 30,000 at the time. Votes had to be cast in person at Oxford in academic dress. The election was by first past the post. To stand a candidate had to be nominated by two electors.

== Candidates ==
At first, the university authorities came up with only one candidate, the wealthy Chairman of Lloyds Bank and former British Ambassador to Washington Sir Oliver Franks.

However, Hugh Trevor-Roper, installed less than three years earlier as Regius Professor of Modern History by the Prime Minister Harold Macmillan, proposed the Prime Minister as an alternative candidate. Trevor-Roper orchestrated the Macmillan campaign, writing to graduates to encourage them to travel to Oxford to vote for Macmillan.

== Result ==
The results were as follows:

Candidate	Votes	%
✓ Harold Macmillan	1,976	53.8
Sir Oliver Franks	1,697	46.2
Turnout	3,673	

== See also ==
- List of chancellors of the University of Oxford
