= Alexander Tottington =

15th-century Bishop of Norwich

- Bishop of Norwich
- Elected: 14 September 1406
- Term ended: 28 April 1413
- Predecessor: Henry le Despenser
- Successor: Richard Courtenay

Orders
- Consecration: 23 October 1407

Personal details
- Died: 28 April 1413
- Denomination: Roman Catholic

Alexander Tottington was a medieval Bishop of Norwich.

Tottington was elected on 14 September 1406 and was consecrated on 23 October 1407. He died on 28 April 1413.

== Citations ==
Catholic Church titles
Preceded by Henry le Despenser	Bishop of Norwich; 1406–1413	Succeeded by Richard Courtenay
