= 1987 University of Oxford Chancellor election =

- 14 March 1987
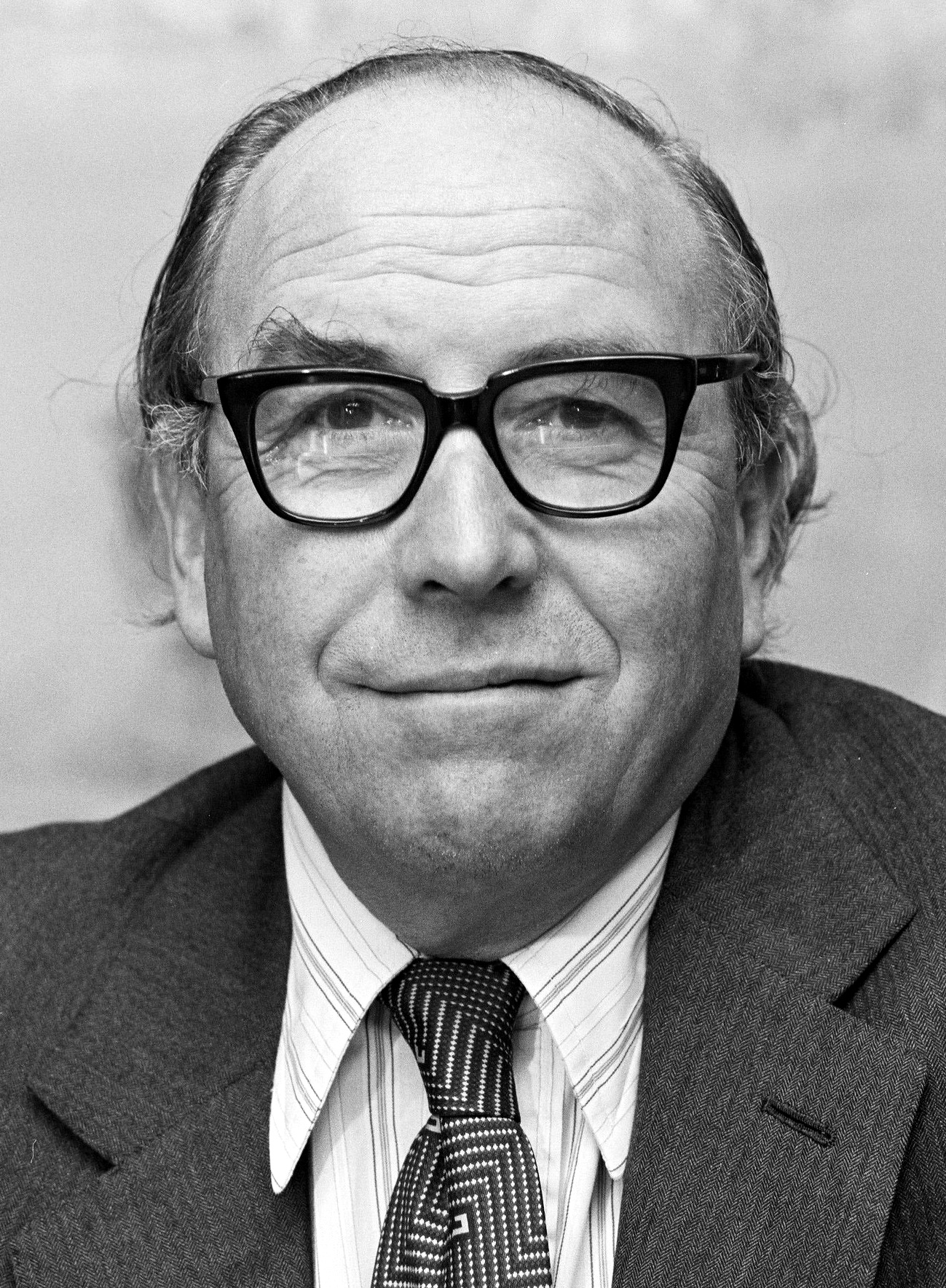

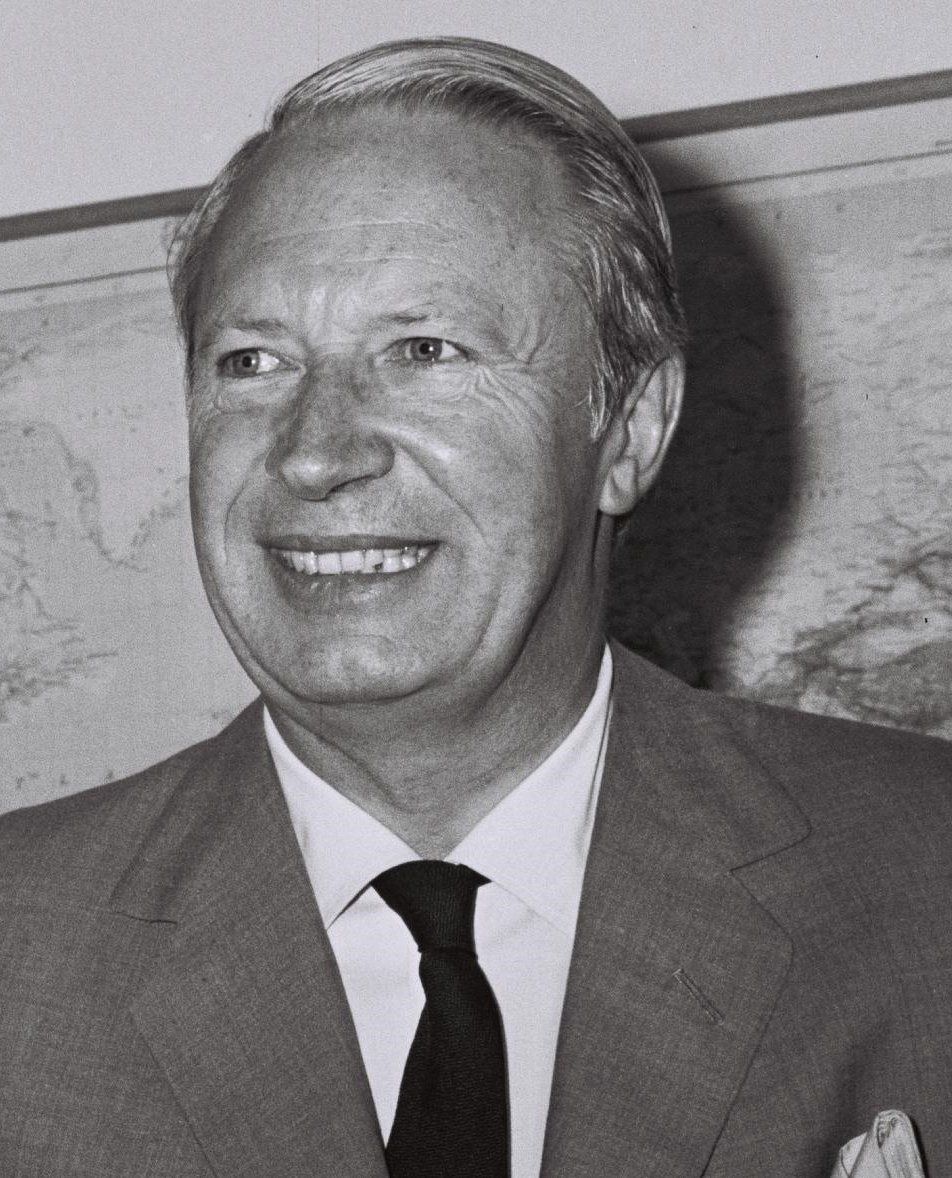

Candidate	Roy Jenkins	Lord Blake
Party	SDP	Conservative
Popular vote	3,249	2,674
Percentage	39.1%	32.2%
Candidate	Edward Heath	Mark Payne
Party	Conservative	Independent
Popular vote	2,348	38
Percentage	28.3%	0.5%
Chancellor before election
Harold Macmillan
Elected Chancellor
Roy Jenkins

The 1987 University of Oxford election for the position of Chancellor was called upon the death of the incumbent Chancellor, Harold Macmillan, on 29 December 1986.

== Electorate ==
The electorate consisted of all members of the University holding the rank of MA. Votes had to be cast in person at Oxford in academic dress. The election was by first past the post. To stand a candidate had to be nominated by two electors.

== Potential candidates ==
The forthcoming election generated much interest, and several names were raised in the press as potential candidates, including:

- Former Labour leaders Lord Wilson of Rievaulx (1916–1995) (Prime Minister 1964–1970 and 1974–1976) and James Callaghan (1912–2005) (Prime Minister 1976–1979)
- Former Conservative leaders Lord Home of the Hirsel (1902–1995) (Prime Minister 1963–1964) and Edward Heath MP (1916–2005) (Prime Minister 1970–1974), and the incumbent leader Margaret Thatcher (1925–2013) (Prime Minister 1979–1990)
- Two other prominent Conservative politicians: former Foreign Secretary Lord Carrington (1919–2018) (held that position 1979–1982; a Cabinet minister in every Conservative government from 1956 until 1982), and Lord Hailsham of St Marylebone (Lord Chancellor 1970–1974 and 1979–1987; a former Conservative Cabinet minister since 1957)
- Social Democratic Party politicians Roy Jenkins (1920–2003) (Home Secretary 1965–1967 and 1974–1976; Chancellor of the Exchequer 1967–1970, Leader of the Social Democrats 1981–1983) and Shirley Williams (1930–2021) (Secretary of State for Prices and Consumer Protection 1974–1976; Paymaster-General & Secretary of State for Education and Science 1976–1979) who had both broken away from Labour in 1981 due to its leftward drift.

All of the above had been educated at Oxford, apart from Lords Callaghan and Carrington.

A notable feature of the election was the decision of the university establishment not to agree a preferred candidate in advance, thus increasing the possibility of a long list of candidates being nominated.

== Candidates nominated ==
Eventually four candidates were nominated:

- Lord Blake, a graduate from Magdalen College, student of Christ Church, Provost of Queen's College, and prominent historian of the Conservative Party
- Sir Edward Heath, a graduate from Balliol College and former Conservative Prime Minister
- Roy Jenkins, also a graduate from Balliol, former Chancellor of the Exchequer, former President of the European Commission and former leader of the Social Democratic Party
- Mark Payne, a general practitioner from Birmingham

== Course of the election ==
The election attracted huge levels of publicity, at times likened to a parliamentary by-election. Much of the attention focused upon the Jenkins and Heath campaigns, whilst Blake was seen as a non-political candidate. Payne was regarded as an outsider.

Much attention was focused on the issue of government funding for universities, with Oxford facing the effects of cuts in its funding, leading to several chairs being left unfilled.

The requirement for those voting to do so in academic dress resulted in the local tailor selling out. One tactic of the supporters of Jenkins was to lend gowns to voters lacking them.

== Result ==
Polling ran until 14 March 1987. The results were as follows:

Candidate	Votes	%
✓ Roy Jenkins	3,249	39.1
Lord Blake	2,674	32.2
Sir Edward Heath	2,348	28.3
Mark Payne	38	0.5
Turnout	8,309	

== See also ==
- List of chancellors of the University of Oxford
