= Roger de Streton =

14th-century English theologian and academic

Roger de Streton DD (also Stratton) was an English medieval theologian and university chancellor.

Streton received a Doctor of Divinity degree. Between 1329 and 1330, he was Chancellor of Oxford University.

Academic offices
Preceded by Robert de Stratford	Chancellor of the University of Oxford; 1329–1330	Succeeded by Robert Paynink? or John Leech
