= John Leech (jurist) =

English jurist and university chancellor

John Leech was an English medieval jurist and university chancellor.

Leech was a professor of Canon Law at Oxford University. Between 1338 and 1339, he was Chancellor of the university.

Academic offices
Preceded by Robert Paynink? or Robert de Stratford	Chancellor of the University of Oxford; 1338–1339	Succeeded by William de Skelton
