= William Courtenay (bishop) =

Archbishop of Canterbury from 1381 to 1396

- Archbishop of Canterbury
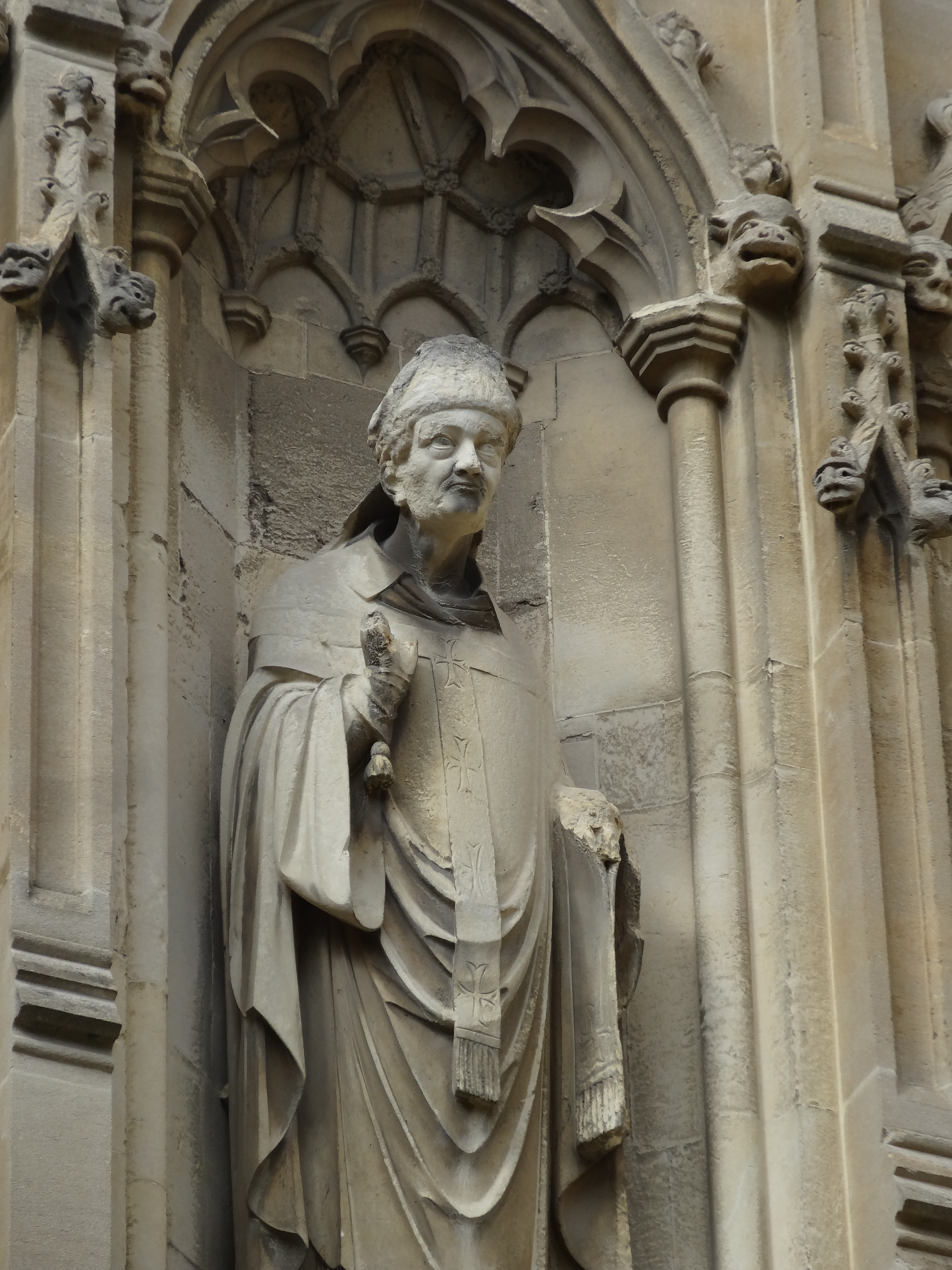
- 19th century statue of William Courtenay, west front, Canterbury Cathedral
- Church: Catholic Church
- Appointed: 30 July 1381
- Installed: unknown
- Term ended: 31 July 1396
- Predecessor: Simon Sudbury
- Successor: Thomas Arundel
- Other posts: Bishop of Hereford; Bishop of London

Orders
- Consecration: 17 March 1370

Personal details
- Born: Exminster, Kingdom of England
- Died: 31 July 1396 (aged around 54) Maidstone, Kingdom of England
- Buried: Canterbury Cathedral

William Courtenay (c. 1342 – 31 July 1396) was Archbishop of Canterbury (1381–1396), having previously been Bishop of Hereford and Bishop of London.

== Early life and education ==
Courtenay was a younger son of Hugh de Courtenay, 2nd Earl of Devon (died 1377), and his wife Margaret, daughter of Humphrey de Bohun, 4th Earl of Hereford and granddaughter of Edward I. He was said to have been born at the family's estate at Exminster.

Being a native of the west of England, Courtenay was educated at Stapledon Hall, Oxford, and after graduating in law was chosen chancellor of the university in 1367. Courtenay's ecclesiastical and political career began about the same time.

== Career ==
Having been made prebendary of Exeter, of Wells and of York, he was consecrated bishop of Hereford on 17 March 1370, was translated to the see of London on 12 September 1375, and became Archbishop of Canterbury on 30 July 1381, succeeding Simon of Sudbury in both these latter positions.

As a politician, the period of Courtenay's activity coincides with the years of Edward III's dotage, and with practically the whole of Richard II's reign. From the first he ranged himself among the opponents of John of Gaunt, duke of Lancaster; he was a firm upholder of the rights of the English Church, and was always eager to root out Lollardry. In 1373 he declared in convocation that he would not contribute to a subsidy until the evils from which the church suffered were removed; in 1375 he incurred the displeasure of the king by publishing a papal bull against the Florentines; and in 1377 his decided action during the quarrel between John of Gaunt and William of Wykeham ended in a temporary triumph for the bishop.

Wycliffe was another cause of difference between Lancaster and Courtenay. In 1377 the reformer appeared before Archbishop Sudbury and Courtenay, when an altercation between the duke and the bishop led to the dispersal of the court, and during the ensuing riot Lancaster probably owed his safety to the good offices of his foe. Having meanwhile become archbishop of Canterbury Courtenay summoned a synod, in London, the so-called "Earthquake Synod", which condemned the opinions of Wycliffe; he then attacked the Lollards at Oxford, and urged the bishops to imprison heretics.

Courtenay was for a short time chancellor of England during 1381, and in January 1382 he officiated at the marriage of Richard II with Anne of Bohemia, afterwards crowning the queen. In 1382 the archbishop's visitation led to disputes with the bishops of Exeter and Salisbury, and Courtenay was only partially able to enforce the payment of a special tax to meet his expenses on this occasion. During his concluding years the archbishop appears to have upheld the papal authority in England, although not to the injury of the English Church.

In 1390 Courtenay protested against confirmation of the Statute of Provisors 1350, and in 1393 he was successful in slightly modifying the Statute of Praemunire 1392. Disliking the extravagance of Richard II, Courtenay publicly reproved the king; and, after an angry scene, the royal threats drove him for a time into Devon. In 1386, he was one of the commissioners appointed to reform the kingdom and the royal household, and in 1387 he arranged a peace between Richard and his enemies under Thomas of Woodstock, Duke of Gloucester.

== Death ==
Courtenay died at Maidstone on 31 July 1396, and was buried towards the east end of the quire in Canterbury Cathedral. He was responsible for the expansion of his family's chantry foundation in Somerset, Naish Priory, as well as significant building works at Christ Church Canterbury and Maidstone College.

== Citations ==
Political offices
Preceded by Hugh Segrave	Lord Chancellor; 1381	Succeeded by Richard Scrope
Catholic Church titles
Preceded by Lewis de Charleton	Bishop of Hereford; 1370–1375	Succeeded by John Gilbert
Preceded by Simon Sudbury	Bishop of London; 1375–1381	Succeeded by Robert Braybrooke
Preceded by Simon Sudbury	Archbishop of Canterbury; 1381–1396	Succeeded by Thomas Arundel
Academic offices
Preceded by Adam de Toneworth	Chancellor of the University of Oxford; 1367–1369	Succeeded by Adam de Toneworth
