= John Purvey =

English preacher, reformer, and disciple of John Wycliffe

John Purvey (c. 1354 – c. 1414) was an English preacher, reformer, and sometime disciple of John Wycliffe. He is popularly associated with the "Later Version" Middle English translations of at least the New Testament of the Middle English Bible popularly associated with Wycliffe, though this has largely been rejected by modern scholarship.

== Biography ==
Historians by the 1980s characterised Purvey's reputation as "a largely posthumous concoction of dubious connections, unwarranted assumptions, and, in some cases, mere speculation."

He was born around 1354 in Lathbury, near Newport Pagnell in the county of Buckinghamshire, England. If he translated the Bible, he must have been a great scholar, however there is no record of him attending or graduating from university. He became a priest on 13 March 1377, or 1378. It has been assumed by previous generations of scholars that Purvey became acquainted with Wycliffe's ideas in Oxford. In around 1382, Purvey lived with Wycliffe at Lutterworth, Leicestershire, along with Nicholas of Hereford and John Aston, and became one of Wycliffe's disciples.

Wycliffe's disciples were called Lollards; a name perhaps derived from the medieval Dutch word meaning "to mutter". This may have reflected a Lollard's practice of vocal reading of the Scripture. The most important group of Lollards were a group of knights who were a part of the king's court. Sir William Neville, Sir John Montague and Sir William Beachamp were a part of this group and had the support of the Black Prince and his younger brother John of Gaunt, reflecting the tradition of noble anticlericalism.

At Lutterworth, it has been traditionally held that Purvey, with Wycliffe's concurrence, revised the 1382 Middle English EV (Earlier Version) translation of the Bible, probably originally mostly done by Nicholas of Hereford and perhaps with Wycliffe, known as the LV (Later Version). The revised LV version of the Bible associated with Purvey's name was completed in 1388. The LV revision use more idiomatic Middle English. The 1382 EV translation has been a more verbatim rendering of the Vulgate and had little consideration for the differences between the Latin and the English, making some passages confusing.

The Later Version translation itself does not contain unusual or heretical renderings, and was so widely accepted that it was owned by obedient churchmen and bishops alike, when not accompanied by seditious or heretical material.

The anonymous "general prologue" included in some manuscripts of the Later Version (LV) version of the Bible, but popularly ascribed to Purvey, speaks of the method of "a poor catiff lettid fro prehying" and discusses the meaning and renders it "myche travile, with diverse felawis and helperis." He also delves into the ideas of how a labourer at Scripture hath "nede to live a clene life, and with good livyng and great traviel" meaning to come to "trewe understanding of holi writ." However, problematically, this tract does not match the known history of the translation: describes an idealized de novo translation methodology by a humble individual but fails to mention the EV, Wyciffe, Nicholas or other translators.

They were in the midst of this undertaking when Wycliffe died in 1384. From Lutterworth, Purvey then moved to Bristol, a city that was well known at the time for its sympathies of Wycliffe and his followers. Meanwhile, in 1387, Purvey, Hereford, Aston, Parker, and Swynderby were banned from preaching by Henry Wakefield, the bishop of Worcester, and were then amalgamated at a college unlicensed and dismissed by law from practising preaching. He then ignored the ban and later admitted to preaching across the country.

In 1388, a commission was sent to all bishops to watch for heretical writings by Purvey and Wycliffe's disciples. Ultimately, Purvey was accused of preaching heresy. Archbishop Arundel investigated Purvey's teachings and found several counts of heresy, including the invalidity of wrongful excommunication, and the ineffectuality of papal law. He was imprisoned in 1390.

Nonetheless he continued to write various works, including commentaries, sermons and treatises condemning what he perceived to be the corruptions of the Catholic Church. By 1401, he was brought before convocation and chose not to face death by burning, like William Sawtrey, he recanted at St Paul's Cross in London and returned to orthodoxy. He confessed on 6 March 1401 and revoked his heresies.

Afterwards Purvey was left alone, and by the end of 1401 he was inducted to the vicarage of West Hythe in Kent. The Lollard priests not involved in uprisings who recanted were not penalized and allowed to go on in their careers. In 1403, he resigned from his parish, and for the next eighteen years it seems he preached or assisted at Mass wherever he could. In 1407 he was criticized in the Lollard text The Testimony of William Thorpe as being neither hot nor cold. On his death, his books and robes were consistent with those a preacher would use.

In 1414, Purvey was named and caught as a participant in the ill-fated Oldcastle rebellion in Derbyshire and Warwickshire, suggesting he had reverted to Lollardy. He was arrested by 12 January and was held at Newgate Prison in London. He died of natural causes on 16 May 1414.

== Representations ==
Poet Thom Satterly, who wrote a book of poems on Wycliffe, has several poems where Purvey describes his time translating with Wycliffe.

== Published works ==
His publications include;

- The New Testament in English, according to the version by John Wycliffe and revised by John Purvey
- Remonstrance against Romish corruptions in the Church
- Ecclesiæ Regimen
- De Compendiis Scripturarum, Paternarum Doctrinarum et Canonum

== See also ==
- Ecclesiae Regimen
- General Prologue, so-called, of some LV Wycliffite Bibles

== Sources ==
- Ward & Trent, et al. The Cambridge History of English and American Literature. New York: G.P. Putnam’s Sons, 1907–21; New York: Bartleby.com, 2000. Web. 21 October 2012.
