= Oldcastle Revolt =

15th century proto-protestant uprising

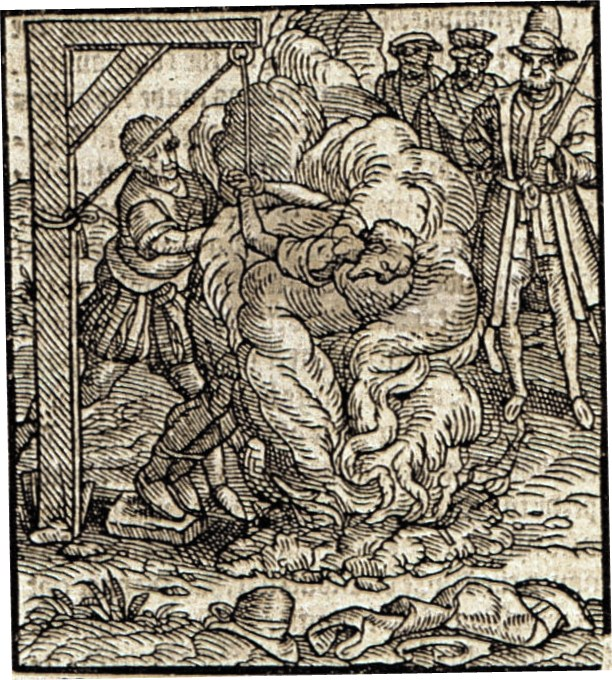
- John Oldcastle being burnt for both high treason and heresy.
Date	9-10 January 1414
Location	London
Result	Royal victory: Suppression of the revolt

Belligerents
Kingdom of England	Lollards

Commanders and leaders
King Henry V Archbishop Thomas Arundel	Sir John Oldcastle (executed); Walter Blake (executed); Sir Roger Acton (executed)

Strength
	222

Casualties and losses
	80 (POW); Additional 78+ (executed)

The Oldcastle Revolt was a Lollard uprising directed against the Catholic Church and the English king, Henry V. The revolt was led by John Oldcastle, taking place on the night of 9th to the 10th of January 1414. The rebellion was crushed following a decisive battle on St. Giles's Fields.

== Background ==
John Oldcastle was born in 1370 and in 1397 inherited his family estates, which included a manor in Almeley as well as lands in Kinnersley and Letton, Herefordshire, and property in and around Hereford. In July 1397, Oldcastle accompanied two Mortimer family retainers to Ireland, later serving under Roger Mortimer. Oldcastle was knighted in 1400, and took part in a campaign against Scotland the same year. In the aftermath of the 1401 outbreak of the Glyndŵr Rising, Oldcastle was appointed captain of Built and later Hay. In January 1404, Oldcastle briefly gained a Parliament seat representing Herefordshire, and was subsequently ordained a country bench member and, finally, sheriff. His loyal service during the pacification of Wales brought him 40 pounds of annuities and an additional issue of 40 marks in 1406. In 1408, he further increased his material wealth by marrying baroness Joan Cobham, thus inheriting lands in Norfolk, Northamptonshire, Wiltshire and Kent.

Oldcastle's religious beliefs were considerably influenced by Lollard cleric William Swynderby, who preached in Almeley during his youth. Lollardy was a politico-religious movement initiated by prominent theologian John Wycliffe in the 1370s during his service in the University of Oxford. Lollard beliefs were outlined in the 1395 The Twelve Conclusions of the Lollards, which dealt with their opposition to capital punishment, rejection of clerical celibacy, and belief that members of the clergy should be tried by the civil courts. The Conclusions also rejected Christian pilgrimages and Christian art inside the churches, which were alleged to take away from focus on God during religious worship. Also denounced in the Conclusions were war, violence, and abortion.

Increasingly radicalised in the years that followed, Oldcastle wrote letters to Hussite leaders Wok of Waldstein and Wladislas of Zwierzeticz, congratulating them on their opposition to the mainstream clergy. The anti-clerical legislation promoted during the inaugural 1410 Parliament session is also considered to be penned by Oldcastle. In 1411, Oldcastle participated in the expeditionary force sent by England in support of Burgundy in its war with Armagnac. Fighting under the command of Henry, Prince of Wales, the pair strengthened their friendship, which was established during the Welsh campaign. The rise of Lollardy alarmed archbishop Thomas Arundel, who unsuccessfully accused Oldcastle of promoting heretical teachings within his estates on several occasions, despite Henry's reluctance to allow the Church to prosecute a close personal friend. By August 1413, King Henry grew tired of Oldcastle's insubordination, permitting Arundel to prosecute him.

Arundel summoned Oldcastle to appear in the Leeds Castle on 11 September 1413, but Oldcastle ignored the call and retreated to Cooling Castle, his keep. Arundel immediately excommunicated the defendant, ordering him to receive judgement on 23 September. On the same day, Oldcastle was brought to the Tower of London, accusing the Pope of being the Antichrist, dismissing the adoration of the cross and the Sacrament of Confession. Following his statements, Oldcastle was charged as a heretic and condemned to execution; Henry intervened once more, giving the inmate forty days to repent. Oldcastle seized the opportunity, escaping on 19 October with aid of a group of London Lollards led by William Parchmyner, and later going into hiding at latter's house in Smithfield.

== Revolt ==
Map of Lollardy's influence: areas of influence before the death of Richard II are in green; areas where Lollardy spread in the 15th century are in red.

During November 1413, several Lollards were sent to the Tower of London, as Oldcastle began sending messages to followers of the sect throughout England. Wealthy Lollards raised funds to equip the conspirators and hire mercenaries. A land-owning widow, Christina More, funded Lollard chaplain, William Blake and her servant to join the rebellion.

The rebels were ordered to arrive at the St. Giles' Fields and the "Urasteleyre on the Hoop" inn at Smithfield on 9 January 1414. Lollards in Belton were the first to rebel, organising a revolt on 26 December 1413; they discontinued it and departed for London a few days later. Priest William Ederyk rallied Lollards in south Derbyshire, the Cok brothers formed a contingent in northern Essex, and pamphlets inciting resistance began circulating in Leicestershire.

The Lollard community of Bristol was considered to be one of the most numerous and well organised, the majority of its members in parish Redcliffe. On 4 January 1414, a party of at least 30 Bristol and rural Somerset Lollards led by chaplain Walter Blake set off for London, Blake had previously purchased body armour and a sword, while the rest of the contingent was equipped with bows. Militia from Daventry, Leicester, Northampton, Buckinghamshire, Bedfordshire, Warwickshire, as well as Sutton, Worcestershire journeyed to London. A total of 222 rebels, including three knights and 15 esquires assembled.

The yeomen John Barton and Thomas Burton, acting as the king's spies, revealed and later raided Oldcastle's hiding place. On 7 January, Henry issued a decree banning unlawful assemblies, and seditious elements were arrested to prevent them from taking part in the plot. Oldcastle realised that his plans were public but decided to pursue his goals of destroying Catholic churches and the houses of the friars, and overthrowing the king, as his supporters had already arrived at the St. Giles' Fields. On the night of 9/10 January 1414, Henry gathered his troops at St. John's Priory, Clerkenwell, while sending patrols that would prevent insurgent reinforcements from reaching their main camp. The loyalist troops charged the rebels; Oldcastle and several Lollards fled immediately after sighting the king's army. Others attempted to counter-attack the enemy at Harringay park but were routed by the numerically superior royalist army. On 10 January, trials were set up to determine the fate of the 80 Lollards captured in the aftermath of the battle. Charged with treason and heresy, all but one militant were burned at the stake or hanged, and commissions were sent to regions with known Lollard populations, detaining local heretics and rebels regardless of their participation in the revolt.

Arrests continued as insurgent commanders Walter Blake and Sir Roger Acton were caught and executed, but Oldcastle managed to evade detainment with support of his old friend John ap Harry, who collected rents from his forfeited estates. Oldcastle was eventually arrested in the area of Welshpool, was then escorted to London, where he was brought to the St. Giles's Fields and burned at the stake on 14 December 1417.

== See also ==
- List of people burned as heretics
- Hussites
