= Lawrence Bedeman =

British priest, scholar, and Lollard

Lawrence Bedeman or Stevine (fl. 1372–1410), British divine and supporter of Wycliffe.

== Life ==
Bedeman appears first, in 1372, as a scholar of Stapeldon Hall, Oxford (now Exeter College), where he became fellow and ultimately rector, holding the latter office from 1379 to 1380.

In 1382 he is mentioned as one of the principal advocates of Wycliffe's doctrines at Oxford. In June of that year he was suspended from preaching, in company with the other leaders of the party (John Aston and Nicholas Hereford), by Archbishop Courtney, then Chancellor of the University of Oxford. A mandate was also issued against him in the same year by Bishop Brantingham, of Exeter, to whom complaints had been made of his activity as a preacher of false doctrine in Cornwall (Boase, xiv, '"sq"'.), Bedeman appears, however, to have held a less conspicuous position than his associates at Oxford, and was the first of them to make his peace with the church, being restored to public functions by a mandate of 18 October 1382.

After this he was made rector of Lifton, in Devonshire, and held this benefice as late as 11 June 1410, when he was licensed to preach in Latin or English. Foxe therefore is mistaken in reckoning him, on the authority of "ancient writers", among those who "suffered most cruel death", or else "did forsake the realm", on account of their attachment to Wycliffe's teaching (Acts and Monuments, iii. 96, ed. Townsend). The name "Bedeman" occurs more than once as "Bedenam" or "Bedmond" (Boase, 194); in the older editions of Foxe it is given as "Redman". Other documents style in "Stevine" ("Stevyn" or "Stephen"), the fuller description being "Laurentius Stephyn, alias dict. Bedeman" (Wilkins, iii. 168). (Note: Boase's Register of Exeter College (Oxford, 1879)) (Note: Fasciculi Zizaniorum, pages 273–5, 309–11. ed. Shirley, Rolls Series) (Note: Wilkins's Concil. Magn. British iii. 157–65. 168) (Note: Wood's Hist. and Antiq. of the Univ. of Oxford, i. 509 sq., ed. Gutch.)
