= Dibelius =

Dibelius is a surname. Notable people with the surname include:

- F. K. Otto Dibelius (1880–1967), German bishop
- Franz Dibelius (1847–1924), German theologian, father of Martin and uncle of Otto
- Martin Dibelius (1883–1947), German theologian
