= McSheffrey =

McSheffrey is a surname. Notable people with the surname include:

- Bryan McSheffrey (born 1952), Canadian ice hockey player
- Gary McSheffrey (born 1982), English footballer
- Shannon McSheffrey, Canadian historian
