= Bankin =

Bankin may refer to:

- Bankin, Iran, a village in East Azerbaijan Province, Iran
- John Bankin (14th century), English churchman
- Viktor Bankin, Ukrainian sports shooter
