= Lollard Disendowment Bill =

The so-called Lollard Disendowment Bill was an English Parliamentary bill proposed by the House of Commons in 1407 or 1410. The Bill gained its name from the fact that it was inspired by the thinking of John Wycliffe, who was also an inspiration to the anti-clerical movement known as the Lollards. The bill proposed that temporalities (secular lands held by the Church) should be removed from spiritually unworthy churches and monasteries—that is that these parts of the Church should be 'disendowed'—and that the temporalities should be transferred to the King (then Henry IV) and to a range of secular landowners. The King and other key decision-makers repudiated the bill and it did not become law.

== Editions ==
- 'The Lollard Disendowment Bill', in Selections from English Wycliffite Writings, ed. by Anne Hudson (Cambridge: Cambridge University Press, 1978), pp. 135–37.
