= The Testimony of William Thorpe =

The Testimony of William Thorpe is a Middle English text dating from 1407. The putative author William Thorpe may have been a Lollard, a follower of John Wycliffe. Although doubts have been raised about the historical accuracy of the Testimony, where its details can be checked they are almost always reliable.

The Testimony purports to record Thorpe's interrogation for heresy (or at least for information regarding Lollardy) by Thomas Arundel, Archbishop of Canterbury.

After several charges of erroneous preaching were brought against Thorpe in the 1380s, he was excommunicated; he continued to preach and in 1407 he was brought before Archbishop Arundel, after preaching at St Chad's Church in Shrewsbury. The charges covered Thorpe’s preaching his views on scripture, the eucharist, pilgrimages, oaths, tithes and confession.

The text goes beyond simply recording the events, and includes many of Thorpe's reactions to the proceedings and dialogues with Arundel. He emphasises the importance of his own conscience, speaking on ‘myn herte’, ‘myn inner man’ and the Lollard views on the ‘homo interior’, as well as Wycliffe’s views on personal confession to God.

The testimony mentions a group of people in Oxford who approved of and tried to implement Wyclif's ideas, including Philip Repyndon, Nicholas Hereford, John Aston, and John Purvey. Thorpe states that he refused to hand over a list of names of Lollards, as he believed that it would lead to their deaths.

Although it suggests an impending martyrdom, the Testimony gives no clue as to Thorpe's punishment - if any.

The text was known to Lollards during the 1400s, but was finally published in 1530; this was during the time of the Reformation, when many people were publicly asking the same questions that Thorpe was arrested for preaching on.
