= 1382 Dover Straits earthquake =

Magnitude 6 earthquake (21 May 1382)

- Location within the United Kingdom
- Local date: 21 May 1382
- Local time: 15:00
- Magnitude: 6.0 M_{s}
- Depth: 25–30 km
- Epicentre: 51.34°N 2.00°E
- Areas affected: Kent, England
- Max. intensity: MMI VII (Very strong) – MMI VIII (Severe)

The 1382 Dover Straits earthquake occurred at 15:00 on 21 May. It had an estimated magnitude of 6.0 M_{s} and a maximum felt intensity of VII–VIII on the Mercalli intensity scale. Based on contemporary reports of damage, the epicentre is thought to have been in the Strait of Dover. The earthquake caused widespread damage in south-eastern England and in the Low Countries. The earthquake interrupted a synod in London that convened in part to examine the religious writings of John Wycliffe, which became known as the Earthquake Synod.

== Geology ==
The geological structure of the eastern part of the English Channel is dominated by the WNW-ESE trending boundary between rocks deformed by the Variscan orogeny and the more stable London-Brabant Massif, known as the Northern Variscan Thrust Front. The London-Brabant Massif has been the proposed location for several historical earthquakes, including the event in 1382.

== Earthquake ==
The magnitude of this event has been estimated using the distribution of felt intensities. Musson in 2008 gave a magnitude of 5.8 M_{L}, while Camelbeek et al. 2007 gave 6.0 M_{s}.

The epicentral location has also been estimated from the distribution of felt intensities. A location in the middle of the Dover Straits, somewhat to the north-east of the similar 1580 Dover Straits earthquake is preferred.

There were significant aftershocks on 23 and 24 May, the latter being the strongest recorded. The 24 May aftershock was also described as a "waterquake" affecting anchored ships.

== Damage ==
In England, the most severe damage was recorded in Canterbury, particularly to St Augustine's Abbey and Canterbury Cathedral, where the bell-tower was destroyed. The manor house and church at Hollingbourne, Kent were also badly damaged. This has been used to estimate intensity in the range VII–VIII. In London there was damage to St Paul's Cathedral and Westminster Abbey with an estimated intensity of VI–VII.

In the Low Countries damage was reported in Ypres, Bruges, Liège and Ghent.

There is no known record of any casualties associated with this event.

== Earthquake synod ==
William Courtenay, the Archbishop of Canterbury convened a synod that met in Blackfriars, in London on the day of the earthquake. The synod was intended to consider the challenges to the church by the group of thinkers that became known as the Lollards, particularly the writings of John Wycliffe. During the deliberations the monastery was shaken by the earthquake, but Courtenay turned it to his advantage saying:

"This earthquake portends the purging of the kingdom from heresies. For as there are shut up in the bowels of the earth many noxious spirits, which are expelled in an earthquake, and so the earth is cleansed, but not without great violence: so there are many heresies shut up in the hearts of reprobate men, but by the condemnation of them the kingdom is to be cleansed, but not without irksomeness and great commotion."

The court found ten of Wycliffe's propositions to be heretical and another six erroneous, allowing Lollards to be prosecuted and executed.
