= Ecclesiae Regimen =

Declaration against the Catholic Church in England

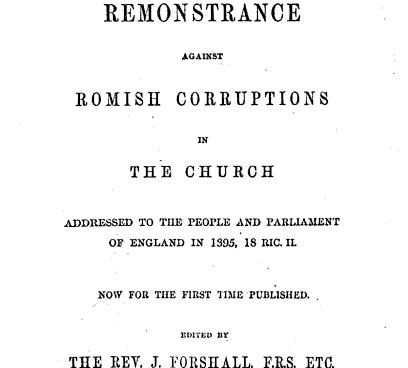
1851 version of Ecclesiae Regimen of 1395 xxxvii Conclusions Lollardorum

The Ecclesiae Regimen, also Remonstrance, xxxvii Conclusiones Lollardorum, or Thirty Seven Articles against Corruptions in the Church, is a church reformation declaration against the Catholic Church of England in the Late Middle Ages. It had no official title given to it when written and the author(s) did not identify themselves in the original manuscript. This public declaration by the English medieval sect called the Lollards was announced to the English parliament at the end of the manifesto Twelve Conclusions of the Lollards published in 1395.

== Contents ==
The manuscript (usually associated with the name Ecclesiae Regimen) is a medieval Latin undated handwritten text document containing church reform thoughts of John Wycliffe and the Lollards. The Roman Catholic Church reformation ideas identified as originally belonging to John Wycliffe was expounded upon by the Wycliffite party known as the Lollards. The purpose of the manuscript was to show the reader how corrupt the Roman Catholic Church was at the time and that it needed reform. Scholars attribute the original manuscript ideas to Wycliffe but that it was actually written by John Purvey after Wycliffe's death in 1384 and sometime before 1395. The arguments for Purvey being the sole author are based on the similarity between this and the General Prologue of the Wycliffe Bible (often attributed to Purvey). Another argument is in the similarity and style of Purvey’s confession in 1400.

== Remonstrance ==
This manuscript was edited by Josiah Forshall and published in 1851 by Mr. Longmans. The English title they ascribed to this manuscript was Remonstrance against Romish corruptions in the Church: addressed to the people and parliament of England in 1395 - with a shortened name of just Remonstrance.

== Provenance ==
The provenance of the text manuscript emanates from November 1897 when it was purchased at a sale in London by Mr. J. J. Green of Godwyn Lodge, Clive Vale, Hastings. There is no paper trail history on the document before this time. There are known to be three copies of the manuscript in existence. The British Museum has one, the Bodleian Library in Oxford has another, and the third copy is at Trinity College in Dublin, Ireland.

The medieval document seems to have been written in the late fourteenth century or early fifteenth century, however most likely before 1395 since it was identified in the Twelve Conclusions of the Lollards affixed in the form of a placard to the doors at Westminster Abbey and Old St Paul's Cathedral for the 1395 English parliament. The English treatise has been identified as being compiled by the same author as the later version of the English translation of the Wycliffe Bible, that is to say the secretary and cohort of Wycliffe, John Purvey.

== Description ==
The handwriting of the treatise is on two sheets of heavy paper. It is written on both sides of the paper which were stitched together with black thread at a much later time since the original gluing method had failed over time. The original black ink has washed to a light brown.

Ecclesia Regimen, the Latin version, has chapter-headings for each of the thirty-seven English "Conclusions Lollardorum".

Latin version
1. Sacerdotes, levite, vel curati
non debent seculariter dominari,
sic intelligendo quod clerici non
seculariter bellabunt nec placitabunt
nec contendent seculariter contra
dominos seculares, auferentes
ab cis dominia temporalia, possunt
tamen clerici habere bona temporalia,
titulo elemosine, solum de
quanto sunt necessaria vel utilia ad
perficiendum officium spiritale.

Middle English version
The firste article
preestis dekenis oþir curatis
shulden not be lordis bi worldli
manere to þis vndirstondinge: þat
preestis & clerkis shulden not fiȝte
bi material swerd. neiþir pleete
neiþir stryue bi worldli manere
aȝens temporal lordis, takinge awei
fro hem seculer lordshipis. neþeles
clerkis most haue temporal godis
bi title of almese. oenli in as moche
as þei ben nedeful or profitable to
parforme here gostli office.

== Sources ==
- The Church quarterly review, Volume 51; Society for Promoting Christian Knowledge (Great Britain); Dr. Gasquet, article 1: Dr. Gasquet and the old English bible and other essays; Spottiswoode, Jan 1901
- Compston, H. F. B., The English Historical Review, Vol. 26, No. 104 (Oct., 1911), pp. 738–749, Oxford University Press (JSTOR 549966)
- Forshall, Josiah, The holy bible containing the old and new testaments with the apocryphal books in the earliest english versions made from the latin Vulgate by John Wycliffe and his followers edited by Josiah Forshall and Sir Frederic Madden, Austrian National Library, University press 1850
- Remonstrance against Romish corruptions in the Church: addressed to the people and parliament of England in 1395
