= Twelve Conclusions of the Lollards =

1395 English document

The Twelve Conclusions of the Lollards is a Middle English religious text written in 1395 containing statements by leaders of the English medieval movement, the Lollards, inspired by some of the teachings of John Wycliffe. The text was presented to the Parliament of England and nailed to the doors of Westminster Abbey and St Paul's Cathedral as a placard (a typical medieval method for publishing).

The text attacked Catholic teachings including confession and prayers for the dead; it supported the idea that each person should be able to read the Bible in their own language, instead of only the official Latin.

A later document entitled Thirty-Seven Conclusions (Thirty-seven Articles against Corruptions in the Church or Ecclesiae Regimen), was published for those that wished more in-depth information. The Thirty-Seven Conclusions were written by John Purvey.

== Twelve conclusions ==
The text summarizes twelve areas in which the Lollards argued that the institutional Christian Church in England needed to be reformed by parliament: the church being "leprous and blind under the maintenance of the proud prelates" bolstered by the flattering of monks ("private religion".) (Note: Original English is quoted from Cronin, op. cit., passim.)

=== First conclusion: state of the Church ===
The first conclusion asserts that the English Church has become too involved in affairs of temporal power, led by the bad example of the Church of Rome, its stepmother, deadly sins that remove its legitimacy (see the portions of the translation with the phrasing "to dote in temperalte, and "challengith the title of heritage").

=== Second conclusion: the priesthood ===
The second conclusion asserts that the ceremonies used for the ordination of priests and bishops are without scriptural basis and not the priesthood into which Christ ordained the apostles. ("For the presthood of Rome is mad (made) with signis, rytis, and bisschopis blissingis." Holy orders are "the leveree (livery) of antecryst.")

=== Third conclusion: clerical celibacy ===
The third conclusion asserts that the practice of clerical celibacy has encouraged sodomy among the clergy and monks, such that churchmen need purgation or worse from their lifestyles - i.e., of decadent "delicious metis and drinkis"; men who like these "like non wymmen".

=== Fourth conclusion: transubstantiation ===
The fourth conclusion asserts that the doctrine of transubstantiation induces idolatry (of the communion bread), suggesting that "Frere Thomas" (Aquinas)' Feast of Corpus Christi service is "untrewe".

=== Fifth conclusion: exorcisms and hallowings ===
The fifth conclusion asserts that the exorcisms and hallowings of substances, objects and pilgrims' staves carried out by priests are a practice of necromancy (shamanism) rather than of Christian theology, asserting that nothing can be changed to be of higher virtue than its kind.

=== Sixth conclusion: clerics in secular offices ===
The sixth conclusion asserts that it is prideful for men who hold high spiritual office in the Church to simultaneously hold positions of great temporal power - "Us thinketh that hermofodrite or ambidexter were a god name for sich manere of men of duble astate." - and that parliament should fully excuse all curates - "bothe heye and lowe" - from temporal office, so they can look after the cure of souls and nothing else.

=== Seventh conclusion: prayers for the dead ===
The seventh conclusion asserts that prayers for the souls of specific individual deceased persons is uncharitable, since it implicitly excludes all the other blessed dead who are not being prayed for, and that the practice of requesting prayers for the dead by making financial contributions is a sort of bribery that corrupts the Church, asserting that the industry of prayers for the dead is simony and idleness: "all almes houses of Ingolond ben wikkidly igrounded".

=== Eighth conclusion: pilgrimages ===
The eighth conclusion asserts that the practices of pilgrimage, images, crucifixes, images of the trinity, and the veneration of relics approach idolatry and are far from alms-giving, and that offerings should be given instead as alms to the needy, who are "the image of God in a more likenesse" than the stick or the stone.

=== Ninth conclusion: confession ===
The ninth conclusion asserts that the practice of confession for the absolution of sins is blasphemous because only God has the power to forgive sins and because if priests did have that power it would be cruel and uncharitable of them to withhold that forgiveness from anyone, even if they refused to confess.

=== Tenth conclusion: war, battle, and crusades ===
The tenth conclusion asserts that, absent a special revelation, Christians should refrain from battle and in particular wars that are given religious justifications, such as crusades, are blasphemous because Christ taught men to love and forgive their enemies, likewise the knights who seek to slay heathens for glory (i.e., Crusaders); moreover, it asserts that lords who purchase indulgences for their army's actions are robbing the poor of those funds.

=== Eleventh conclusion: female vows of continence and abortion ===
The eleventh conclusion asserts that nuns in the Church who have made vows of celibacy should be married, rather than being fickle, becoming pregnant and then seeking abortions - referred to as "the most horrible synne possible to man kynde" - to conceal the fact that they had broken their vows, all practices the text strongly condemns.

=== Twelfth conclusion: arts and crafts ===
The twelfth conclusion asserts that the multitude of crafts used by the Church causes waste, curiosity (distraction by non-essentials) and "disgysing"; only crafts necessary for simple living should be tolerated. "Us thinketh that goldsmethis and amoreris and all manere craftis nout nedeful to man…schulde be distroyd."

== Versions ==
According to some scholars, the Twelve Conclusions were likely written in Middle English, translated to Latin for presentation to Parliament, and translated to Latin independently again, which John Foxe then re-translated back to (Elizabethan, Early Modern) English for his Acts and Monuments collection. This manuscript was edited by Josiah Forshall and published in 1851 by Mr. Longmans.

== General Prologue to the Wycliffe Bible ==
The so-called General Prologue of the Wycliffe Bible (Note: The "General Prologue" is a 15 chapter explanation of translation policies and methodologies written by John Purvey in his revision of the translation done by John Wycliffe in the late 14th century, e.g., for the fifteenth chapter, see this link.) found on some later version (LV) manuscripts (1395) gives an allusion to the Lollard Twelve Conclusions by the use of the words "last parliament". It gives an indication that the General Prologue was written in 1395–1397 for the previous parliament that just took place in 1395 and before the next parliament that took place in 1397. The Twelve Conclusions and its expanded version of Thirty-Seven Conclusions have been attributed to the presumed author of the General Prologue of the Wycliffe Bible, John Purvey, written 1395.

== See also ==
- Trial of Eleanor Rykener
