= Earthquake Synod =

English synod (1382) convened to address Lollardy

The Earthquake Synod was an English synod that took place on 21 May 1382 in the Blackfriars area of London, England.

William Courtenay, the Archbishop of Canterbury, convened the synod to address the emerging Lollard thinkers challenging the church. In particular, the synod condemned John Wycliffe's twenty-four theses, although many had already been condemned as heresy by a synod at St. Paul's Cathedral in February 1377. The synod also issued teachings on the doctrine of transubstantiation and friars. The synod got its name from the fact that the 1382 Dover Straits earthquake shook the city of London during its meetings.
