= Gotthard Victor Lechler =

German Lutheran theologian (1811-1888)

Gotthard Victor Lechler (18 April 1811 – 26 December 1888) was a German Lutheran theologian born in Kloster Reichenbach, near Freudenstadt, in Württemberg.

== Biography ==
He studied at the University of Tübingen under Ferdinand Christian Baur, and later served as a deacon in Waiblingen and Knittlingen. In 1858, he became pastor at the church of St Thomas and professor ordinarius of historical theology at the University of Leipzig.

A disciple of Johann August Wilhelm Neander, he was aligned with the extreme right of the mediating theologians. He is significant as a historian of early Christianity and of the pre-Reformation period. Although Baur was his teacher, he did not adhere to the Tübingen school. In response to the idea of a sharp conflict between the Paulinists and Petrinists, he argued that "we find variety coupled with agreement, and unity with difference, between Paul and the earlier apostles; we recognize the one spirit in the many gifts."

== Published works ==
His Das apostolische und das nachapostolische Zeitalter (1851), which developed out of a prize essay (1849), passed through three editions in Germany (3rd edition, 1885), and was translated into English (The apostolic and post-apostolic times: their diversity and unity in life and doctrines, 2 volumes, 1886). The work which in his own opinion was his greatest, Johann von Wiclif und die Vorgeschichte der Reformation (2 volumes, 1873), appeared in English with the title John Wycliffe and his English precursors (1878, new edition, 1884). An earlier work, Geschichte des englischen Deismus (1841), was a contribution to the study of religious thought in England.

Lechler's other works include Geschichte der Presbyterial- und Synodal-verfassung (1854), Urkundenfunde zur Geschichte des christl. Altertums (1886), and biographies of Thomas Bradwardine (1862) and Robert Grosseteste (1867). He wrote part of the commentary on the Acts of the Apostles in Johann Peter Lange's Bibelwerk. From 1882 he edited with Franz Dibelius the Beiträge zur sächsischen Kirchengeschichte. His biography of Johannes Hus, Johannes Hus ein Lebensbild aus der Vorgeschichte der Reformation (1889), was published after his death.
