= John Bankin =

14th-century monk and public figure

John Bankin (fl. 1347–1387), was the prior of the Augustinian convent, London, and a religious controversialist (a supporter of John Wycliffe who turned opponent).

== Biography ==
Bankin was born in London and educated in the Augustinian monastery of that city and afterwards at Oxford, where he attained the degree of doctor of divinity before 1382.

In the early years of the 1370s Bankin appears to have been a supporter of John Wycliffe. Christina von Nolcken states that “In 1371 Bankin and another Augustinian friar (perhaps Thomas Ashbourne) laid articles before parliament urging the use of clerical endowments to help finance the war in France. In making such a proposal they were voicing what seem to have been widely held ideas that are known to be ones that Wycliffe supported.”

By the end of the decade Bankin had turned against Wycliffe, probably because he disliked the contents of Wycliffe's De eucharistia (published in 1380). He attended the provincial council of Blackfriars which condemned certain of Wycliffe's opinions in May 1382. Bishop Bale states that Bankin was a popular preacher and an able disputant. Poole 1885, p. 136

== Works ==
Bishop Bale states that his writings comprise Determinationes and Sermones ad Populum, as well as a book Contra Positiones Wiclevi. Of these works, however, no copies are known to be extant.

The ambiguity of the manuscript of the Fasciculi Zizaniorum, which ignores the distinction between n and u, has led Shirley to print the name Baukinus; and Foxe anglicises it as Bowkin. The n, however, appears in two other copies.
