= John Aston (preacher) =

14th-century English Lollard

John Aston or Ashton (fl. 1382), was one of John Wycliffe's earliest followers.

== Life ==
Aston is described as M.A. and 'scholar' (or, once, 'bachelor') in theology at Oxford, and, according to Anthony à Wood, was a member of Merton College. He appears first to have been engaged as one of Wycliffe's band of itinerant priests, and by the year 1382 had become conspicuous for his advocacy of his master's views, particularly of those relating to the sacrament of the Lord's supper. Knighton (col. 2658, sq.) describes the zeal with which he carried on his mission as a preacher of the new doctrine, and the Fasciculi Zizaniorum (p. 274) makes the rebel John Ball, in his confession, name Aston in company with Nicholas Hereford and Lawrence Bedeman as the leaders of Wycliffe's party. In 1382 these three men, together with Philip Repyngdon, were singled out among the Oxford Wycliffites as the subjects of a prosecution at the hands of Archbishop William Courtney, who first issued, 12 June, an ineffectual mandate restraining them from public functions in the university, and then summoned them to an examination to be held before him at Blackfriars Priory in London.

Wycliffe's specific doctrines had, in fact, been already condemned at the 'earthquake' council of Blackfriars in the preceding month, and there was little difficulty in implicating his disciples in them. Aston appeared on 18 June. He circulated a broadsheet declaring his allegiance to the faith of the church, and won so much sympathy that his final hearing on the 20th was interrupted and nearly broken up by the invasion of a friendly mob. He was, however, condemned, and, by virtue of a subsequent royal patent, dated 13 July, was expelled from his university.

By the archbishop's order a search was then made for him and his companions, and at length, in October, Aston was seized. On 27 November he followed the example of Bedeman and Repyngdon (Hereford had left the country), recanted, and returned to Oxford. His recantation, however, was transient. In 1387, Bishop Wakefield of Worcester denounced him as a dangerous Lollard, and prohibited him from preaching. According to John Foxe, he was cited and condemned later by Archbishop Arundel; but this statement seems to rest upon the notice in the St. Albans Chronicles of the popular disturbance at his trial, which evidently relates to that held by Archbishop Courtney.

== Works ==
A few writings by Aston are enumerated by John Bale (Scriptorum Illustrium Catalogus, p. 495, ed. Basle, 1559).

== Name ==
The name is spelled variously. The authorities last mentioned give 'Astone;' the Fasciculi Zizaniorum alternate between 'Astone' and 'Aston;' while the Lambeth registers (see Fasc. Ziz., p. 310, n. 8) have 'Ashton,' and Wilkins prints 'Asshton.' Other forms are 'Ayston' (Wood, l. c.) and 'Aysliton' (Tanner, Bibl. Brit.-Hib., 54).
