= Franz Dibelius =

German Protestant theologian

Franz Wilhelm Dibelius (6 January 1847, in Prenzlau – 20 January 1924, in Dresden) was a German Protestant theologian. He was the father of theologian Martin Dibelius (1883-1947) and an uncle to theologian Otto Dibelius (1880–1967).

He studied at the University of Halle, receiving his theology license in 1871. In 1873 he obtained his habilitation for church history, and during the following year, became a pastor at Annenkirche in Dresden. In 1884 he was named pastor at the Kreuzkirche (Church of the Holy Cross) in Dresden, then in 1910 was appointed Oberhofprediger and vice-president of the Landeskonsistorium (country consistory).

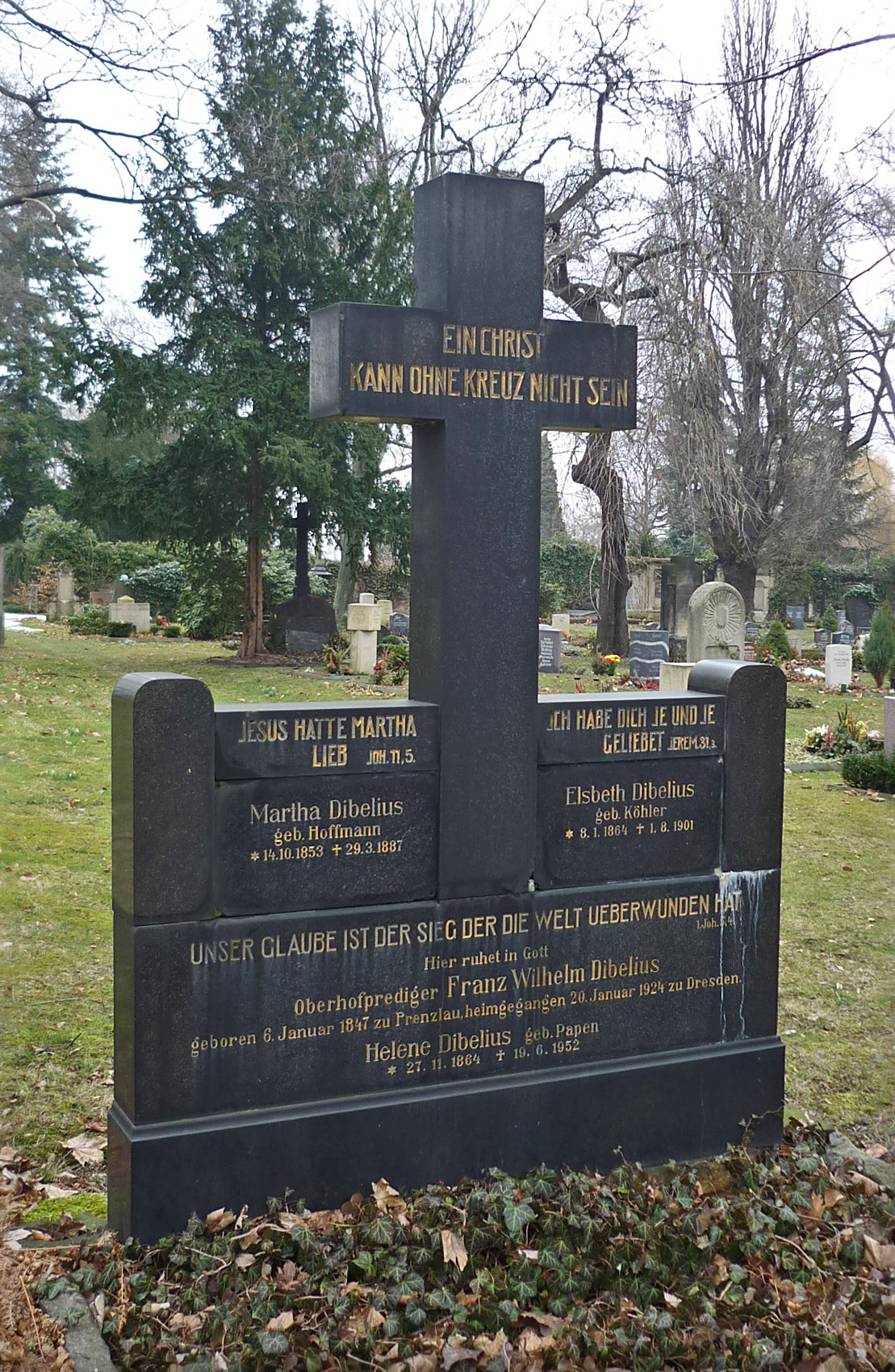
Grave of Dibelius at the Alten Annenfriedhof in Dresden

He was a founder of the Gesellschaft für Sächsische Kirchengeschichte (Society of Saxon church history), and in 1893 was named chair at the Dresden Hauptverein of the Gustav-Adolf Vereins. From 1882, with Gotthard Victor Lechler, he was editor of the Beiträge zur sächsischen Kirchengeschichte ("Contributions to Saxon church history").

== Selected works ==
- Gottfried Arnold : sein Leben und seine Bedeutung für Kirche und Theologie. Eine kirchenhistorische Monographie, (1873) – Gottfried Arnold: his life and his significance for the church and theology.
- Die einführung der reformation in Dresden; aus anlass der erinnerungsfeier im jahre 1889, (1889) – The introduction of the Reformation in Dresden.
- Die Bernwardstür zu Hildesheim, 1907 – The Bernward Doors of Hildesheim.
