= Shannon McSheffrey =

Shannon McSheffrey FRHS is professor of history at Concordia University and a specialist in late medieval England.

== Selected publications ==
- Gender and Heresy: Women and Men in Lollard Communities, 1420-1530 (University of Pennsylvania Press, 1995)
- Love and Marriage in Late Medieval London (Medieval Institute Publications, 1995)
- Lollards of Coventry 1486-1522 (co-authored with Norman Tanner), Camden Fifth Series, vol. 23 (Cambridge University Press, 2003)
- Marriage, Sex, and Civic Culture in Late Medieval London (University of Pennsylvania Press, 2006)
- Seeking Sanctuary: Law, Mitigation, and Politics in English Courts, 1400-1550 (Oxford University Press, 2017)
