= Lollardy =

Radical Christian reform movement

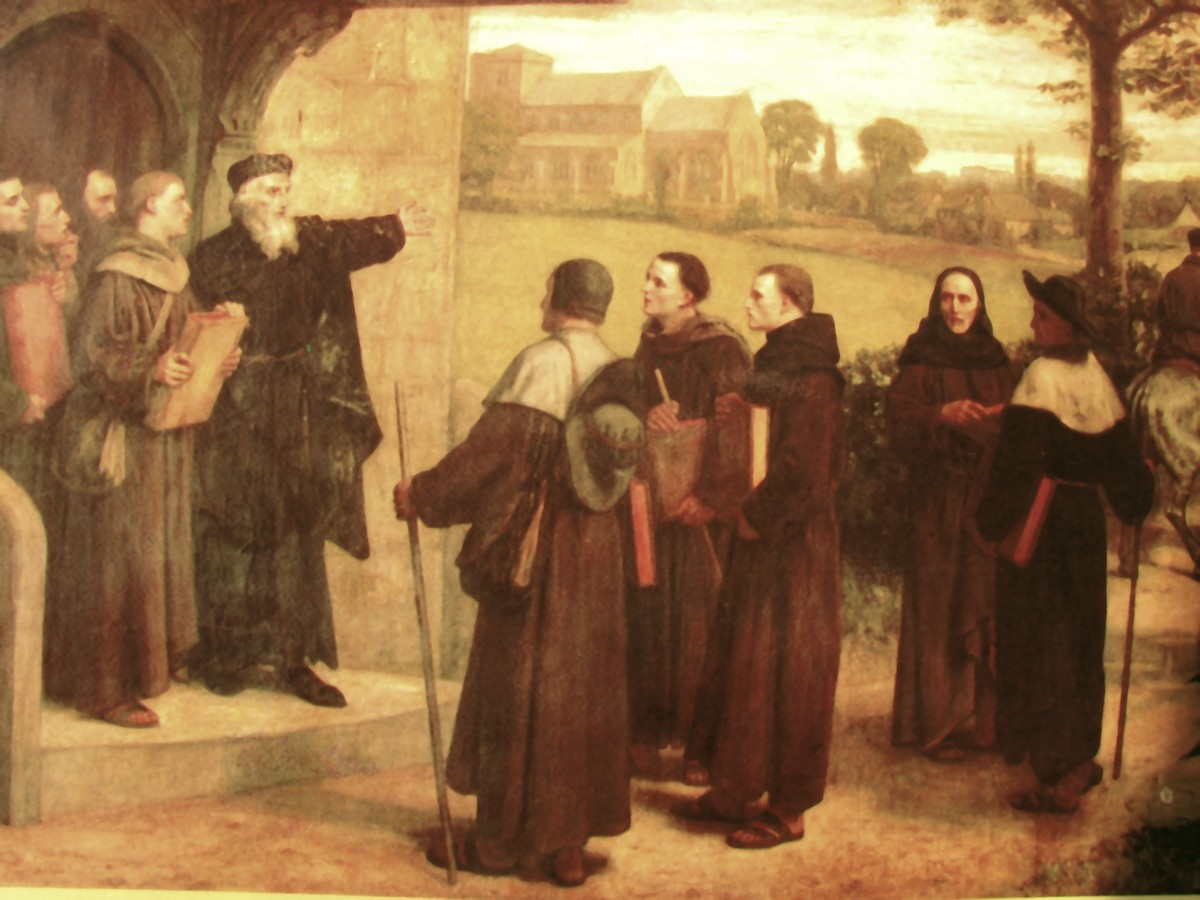
In this 19th-century illustration, John Wycliffe is shown giving the Bible translation that bore his name to his Lollard followers.

Lollardy (Note: Also known as Lollardism, or the Lollard movement.) was a proto-Protestant Christian religious movement that was active in England from the mid-14th century until the 16th-century English Reformation. It was initially led by John Wycliffe, a Catholic theologian who was later dismissed from the University of Oxford in 1381 for heresy. The Lollards' demands were primarily for reform of Western Christianity. They formulated their beliefs in the Twelve Conclusions of the Lollards.

== Etymology ==
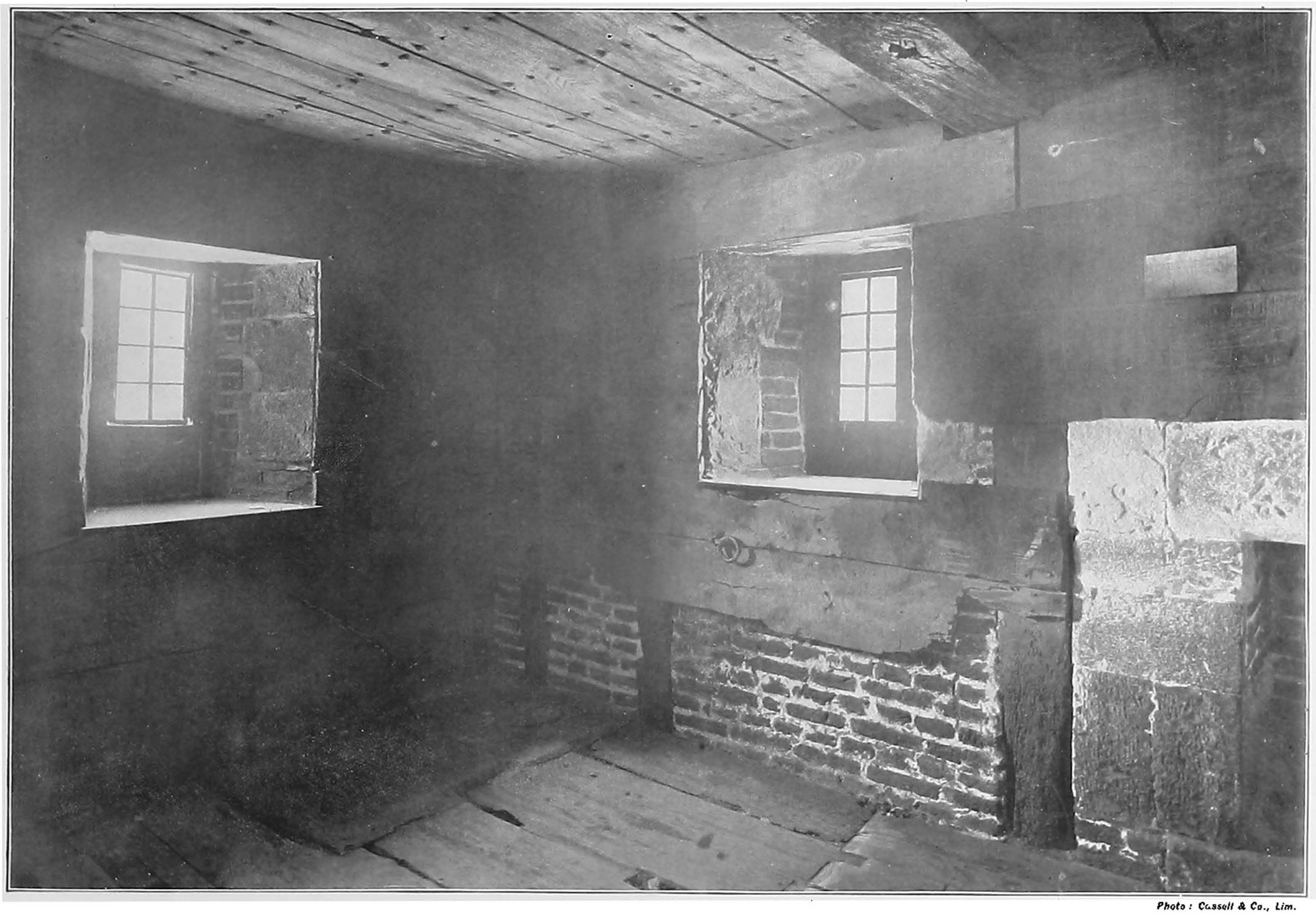
Lollards' prison in Lambeth Palace, overlooking the River Thames in London

Lollard, Lollardi, or Loller was the popular derogatory nickname given to those without an academic background, educated (if at all) mainly in English, who were reputed to follow the teachings of John Wycliffe in particular. By the mid-15th century, "lollard" had come to mean a heretic in general. The alternative term "Wycliffite" is generally accepted to be a more neutral term covering those of similar opinions, but having an academic background.

The term is said to have been coined by the Anglo-Irish cleric Henry Crumpe, but its origin is uncertain. The earliest official use of the name in England occurs in 1387 in a mandate of the Bishop of Worcester against five "poor preachers", nomine seu ritu Lollardorum confoederatos. According to the Oxford English Dictionary, it most likely derives from Middle Dutch lollaerd ("mumbler, mutterer"), from a verb lollen ("to mutter, mumble"). The word is much older than its English use; there were Lollards in the Netherlands at the beginning of the 14th century who were akin to the Fraticelli, Beghards, and other sectaries similar to the recusant Franciscans.

Originally the Dutch word was a colloquial name for a group of buriers of the dead during the Black Death, in the 14th century, known as Alexians, Alexian Brothers or Cellites. These were known colloquially as lollebroeders (Middle Dutch for "mumbling brothers"), or Lollhorden, from Old High German: lollon ("to sing softly"), from their chants for the dead. Middle English loller (akin to the verb loll, lull, the English cognate of Dutch lollen "to mutter, mumble") is recorded as an alternative spelling of Lollard, while its generic meaning "a lazy vagabond, an idler, a fraudulent beggar" is not recorded before 1582.

Two other possibilities for the derivation of Lollard are mentioned by the Oxford English Dictionary:

- Latin lolium, a weedy vetch (tares), supposedly a reference to the biblical Parable of the Tares (Matthew 13:24–30);
- the surname "Lolhard" of an eminent Franciscan preacher in Guyenne, who converted to the Waldensian way. The region of Guyenne was at that time under English dominion, and his preaching influenced pious lay English. He was burned at Cologne in the 1370s. Earlier, another Waldensian teacher, also named "Lolhard", was tried for heresy in Austria in 1315.

== Beliefs ==
A map of Lollardy's influence. Areas of Lollardy's influence before the death of Richard II are in green. Areas where Lollardy spread in the 15th century are in red.

According to scholar Margaret Aston, as Wycliffe's academic theology percolated to the masses, it changed measurably, some parts strengthening and others weakening. Historian John Thomson is paraphrased "Rather than a specific creed of well thought out theological doctrine, Lollard beliefs are more aptly described as a set of consistent attitudes."

=== Eucharist ===
With regard to the Eucharist, Lollards such as John Wycliffe, William Thorpe and John Oldcastle taught a view of the mystical (and yet) real presence of Christ in Holy Communion known as "consubstantiation"; but they did not accept the formulation of the idea of transubstantiation, which the Roman Catholic Church required the faithful not to deny. Wycliff, at least, held that transubstantiation was impossible as it required the destruction of matter (the bread), rather than its mere imbuing with an additional being (the body of Christ). Wycliffite teachings on the Eucharist were declared heresy at the Blackfriars Council of 1382, and later by the Pope and the Council of Constance.

"The Plowman's Tale", a medieval Lollard poem, argues that theological debate about Latin doctrine is less important than the Real Presence:

I say sothe thorowe trewe rede
His flesh and blode, through his mastry
Is there/ in the forme of brede
Howe it is there/ it nedeth not stryve
Whether it be subgette or accydent
But as Christ was/ when he was on-lyve
So is he there verament.

[In modern English:]
I say the truth through true understanding:
His flesh and blood, through his subtle works,
Is there in the form of bread.
In what manner it is present need not be debated,
Whether as subject or accident,
But as Christ was when he was alive,
So He is truly there.

William Sawtry, a priest, was reportedly burned in 1401 for his preaching that "bread remains in the same nature as before" after consecration by a priest. A suspect in 1517 summed up the Lollards' position: "Summe folys cummyn to churche thynckyng to see the good Lorde — what shulde they see there but bredde and wyne?"

In the mid 15th century a priest associated with the lollards named Richard Wyche was accused of teaching false doctrine that had corrupted the faith of Northumbrians. There remains a letter detailing his version of the inquisitional proceedings, where a succession of theologians and others attempted to convince him of the Catholic position on transubstantiation, or at least to find some compromise wording by which he would not deny it. When asked about transubstantiation during his questioning, he repeated only his belief in the Real Presence. When asked if the host was still bread even after consecration, he answered only: "I believe that the host is the real body of Christ in the form of bread". Throughout his questioning he insisted that he was "not bound to believe otherwise than Holy Scripture says" and used various arguments against the inquisitors' claims that the use of the qualifier 'in the form of bread'. Following the questioning, he claimed he had been allowed to swear an oath qualified in his heart; later his inquisitors denied this. His denial of having taken the unqualified oath was taken as a re-canting by the bishop, preventing his attempted appeal to the Pope. He was excommunicated, defrocked, and imprisoned, and he would later be executed by the state (although for a separate stubbornness).

Lollard teachings on the Eucharist are attested to in numerous primary source documents. It is the fourth of the Twelve Conclusions and the first of the Sixteen Points on which the Bishops accuse Lollards. It is discussed in The Testimony of William Thorpe, the Apology for Lollard Doctrines, Jack Upland, and Opus Arduum.

=== Denial of sacraments and sacramentals ===
Believing in a universal priesthood, the Lollards challenged the Church's authority to invest or to deny the divine authority to make a man a priest. Lollards also did not view oral confession to a priest (auricular confession) as strictly necessary for the remission of sins. However, they strongly maintained that contrition of the heart and confession to God were essential for salvation. While they believed it is beneficial to confess to a good priest, it is perilous to confess to a bad one. Lollards challenged the practice of clerical celibacy and believed priests should not hold government positions as such temporal matters would likely interfere with their spiritual mission.

Lollard views on baptism were diverse, and while some radicals were accused of denying the need for infant baptism, the movement generally focused on the distinction between the "baptism of water" and the "baptism of the Spirit." John Wycliffe’s own theology, which underpins Lollardy, was rooted in a revival of Augustinianism. This tradition emphasizes the necessity of grace and the "baptism of the Spirit" for salvation, even if it downplays the absolute necessity of the physical ritual if a priest is unavailable or corrupt. Lollard rejection of "baptism of water" was often a critique of the ceremony's necessity rather than the sacrament's underlying spiritual reality.

Lollards also considered praying to saints and honouring of their images to be a form of idolatry. Oaths, fasting and prayers for the dead were thought to have no scriptural basis. They had a poor opinion of the trappings of the Catholic Church, including holy water, bells, organs, and church buildings. They rejected the value of papal pardons.

=== The Twelve Conclusions ===
One group of Lollards petitioned Parliament with the Twelve Conclusions of the Lollards by posting them on the doors of Westminster Hall in February 1395. While by no means a central statement of belief of the Lollards, the Twelve Conclusions reveal certain basic Lollard ideas.

- The first Conclusion rejects the acquisition of temporal wealth by Church leaders, as accumulating wealth leads them away from religious concerns and towards greed.
- The fourth Conclusion deals with the Lollard view that the Sacrament of the Eucharist is a debatable doctrine that is not clearly defined in the Bible. Whether the bread remains bread or becomes the literal body of Christ is not specified uniformly in the gospels.
- The sixth Conclusion states that officials of the Church should not concern themselves with secular matters when they hold a position of power within the Church, since this constitutes a conflict of interest between matters of the spirit and matters of the State.
- The eighth Conclusion points out the ludicrousness, in the minds of Lollards, of the reverence that is directed toward images of Christ's suffering. "If the cross of Christ, the nails, spear, and crown of thorns are to be honoured, then why not honour Judas's lips, if only they could be found?"
- The eleventh Conclusion was that female religious vows were unsafe, given that unmarried females could not contain their lust and would fall pregnant and commit abortion.
- Expensive church artwork was seen as an excess. They believed effort should be placed on helping the needy and preaching rather than working on expensive decorations. Icons were also seen as dangerous since many seemed to be worshipping the icons more fervently than they worshipped God.

Later, an expanded version the "Thirty Seven Conclusions" or "Remonstrances" was submitted in the late 1390s; the author is not known.

=== Vernacular scripture ===
Lollardy was a religion of vernacular scripture. Lollards opposed many practices of the Catholic church. Anne Hudson has written that a form of sola scriptura underpinned Wycliffe's beliefs, but distinguished it from the more radical ideology that anything not permitted by scripture is forbidden. Instead, Hudson notes that Wycliffe's sola scriptura held the Bible to be "the only valid source of doctrine and the only pertinent measure of legitimacy."

Later Lollards believed that people deserved access to a copy of their own Bible. Many attempted to distribute English copies. Due to the lack of a printing press and low literacy levels, it was difficult to accomplish this goal.

However, a notable feature of some Lollard inquisitions was the common claim of illiteracy, or vision impairment, as a defence against the suspicion of Lollardy raised by possession of suspect vernacular texts.

Despite popular beliefs to the contrary:

There is no doubt that the Lollards (as Wycliffe's followers were called) were persecuted, but it does not appear that the possession, use, or manufacture of an English version of the Bible was one of the charges specially urged against them. The subject is not raised in the extant list of articles upon which the suspected were to be questioned.

— Fredrick Kenyon, Our Bible and the Ancient Manuscripts, 1903

=== Catholic practices ===
Lollards did not observe fasting and abstinence in the Catholic Church. In heresy proceedings against Margery Baxter it was presented as evidence that a servant girl found bacon in a pot of oatmeal on the first Saturday of Lent. Non-observance of dietary restrictions was used as evidence of heresy in another Norfolk case against Thomas Mone, where it was alleged that a piglet was eaten for Easter dinner when eating meat was forbidden.

Special vows were considered to be in conflict with the divine order established by Christ and were regarded as anathema.

Lollards had a tendency toward iconoclasm.

Some Lollards believed work was permissible on Sundays.

=== Foxe ===
Sixteenth-century martyrologist John Foxe reduced the main beliefs of Lollardy to four (none of which correspond exactly to the five solae alleged of Protestantism), marginalizing the Wycliffite doctrine of dominium, claiming they were:

- opposition to pilgrimages
- opposition to saint worship
- denial of the doctrine of transubstantiation (e.g. in favour of consubstantiation)
- a demand for English translation of the Scriptures

== History ==
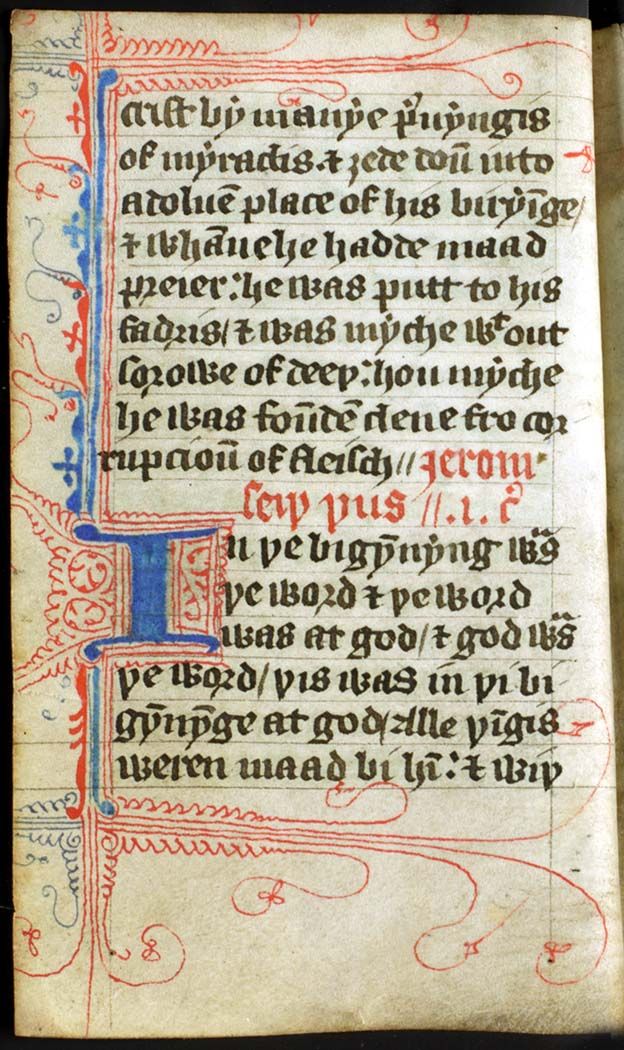
A late 14th-century beginning of the Gospel of John, starting with a large letter "I" in blue, from a pocket Wycliffe translation. It may have been used by a roving Lollard preacher

Although Lollardy was denounced as a heresy by the Catholic Church, initially Wycliffe and the Lollards were sheltered by politically-influential nobleman John of Gaunt and other anti-clerical nobility, who may have wanted to use Lollard-advocated clerical reform to acquire new sources of revenue from England's monasteries. The University of Oxford also protected Wycliffe and similar academics on the grounds of academic freedom and, initially, allowed such persons to retain their positions despite their controversial views.

Two primary religious opponents of the Wycliffites were Archbishop of Canterbury William Courtenay and his successor Thomas Arundel, assisted by bishops like Henry le Despenser of Norwich, whom the chronicler Thomas Walsingham praised for his zeal.

Historian T. Waugh suggests the Lollard movement was small with little appeal to the upper classes, who liked the anti-clerical politics but not the religious doctrines. "Notices of Lollardy after the death of Wycliffe are scattered and meagre. Sixteenth century Protestantism invested the Lollards with a posthumous renown, but there can be little doubt that, when their first energy had spent itself, they speedily became an obscure sect, destitute of living leaders, and vaguely re-echoing the teaching of a deceased founder whom they only half understood."

=== Oxford Lollards ===
The initial Lollards were a small group of scholars, particularly at Merton College, Oxford University, some with important positions, who came under the influence of Wycliffe in the 1360s and 1370s. After Wycliffe's natural death, all of them eventually submitted to Archbishop of Canterbury William Courtenay to renounce Wycliffe's contentious doctrines, and none suffered long-term consequences. These notably included Nicholas Hereford, who is usually named as the translator of most of the Old Testament of the Wycliffean Middle English Bible.

=== Peasants' Revolt ===
Lollards first faced serious persecution after the Peasants' Revolt in 1381. While Wycliffe and other Lollards opposed the revolt, one of the peasants' leaders, John Ball, preached Lollardy. Prior to 1382, Wycliffite beliefs were tolerated in government as they endorsed royal superiority to bishops. However, the government and royals were hesitant, as they did not want to encourage subjects to criticize religious powers.

After 1382, royalty and nobility found Lollardy to be a threat not only to the Church, but to English society in general. The Lollards' small measure of protection evaporated. This change in status was also affected by the departure of John of Gaunt (Duke of Lancaster, patron of Chaucer and protector of John Wycliffe) who left England in 1386 to pursue the Crown of Castile.

Paul Strohm has asked: "Was the Lollard a genuine threat or a political pawn, agent of destabilising challenge, or a hapless thread of self-legitimizing Lancastrian discourse?"

=== Lollard Knights ===
A group of gentry active during the reign of Richard II (1377–99) were known as "Lollard Knights" either during or after their lives due to their acceptance of Wycliffe's claims. Henry Knighton, in his Chronicle, identifies the principal Lollard Knights as Thomas Latimer, John Trussell, Lewis Clifford, Sir John Peche (son of John Peche of Wormleighton), Richard Storey, and Reginald Hilton. Thomas Walsingham's Chronicle adds William Nevil and John Clanvowe to the list, and other potential members of this circle have been identified by their wills, which contain Lollard-inspired language about how their bodies are to be plainly buried and permitted to return to the soil whence they came.

There is little indication that the Lollard Knights were specifically known as such during their lifetimes. They were men of discretion, and unlike Sir John Oldcastle years later, rarely gave any hint of open rebellion. However, they displayed a remarkable ability to retain important positions, without falling victim to the prosecutions of Wycliffe's followers during their lifetimes.

=== Legal response ===
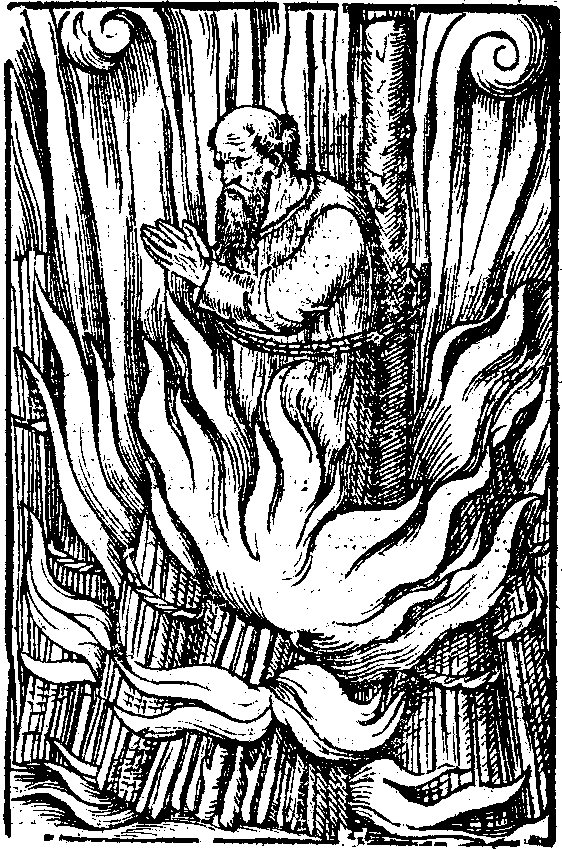
Lollard Richard Wyche being burnt at the stake in 1440

Religious and secular authorities strongly opposed Lollardy. In eventual response to the revolting Lollards, the law De heretico comburendo was enacted in 1401 during the reign of Henry IV; traditionally heresy had been defined as an error in theological belief, but this statute equated theological heresy with sedition against political rulers.

By the early 15th century, stern measures were undertaken by Church and state which drove Lollardy underground. One such measure was the 1410 burning at the stake of John Badby, a layman and craftsman who refused to renounce his Lollardy. He was the first layman to suffer capital punishment in England for the crime of heresy.

=== Oldcastle Revolt ===
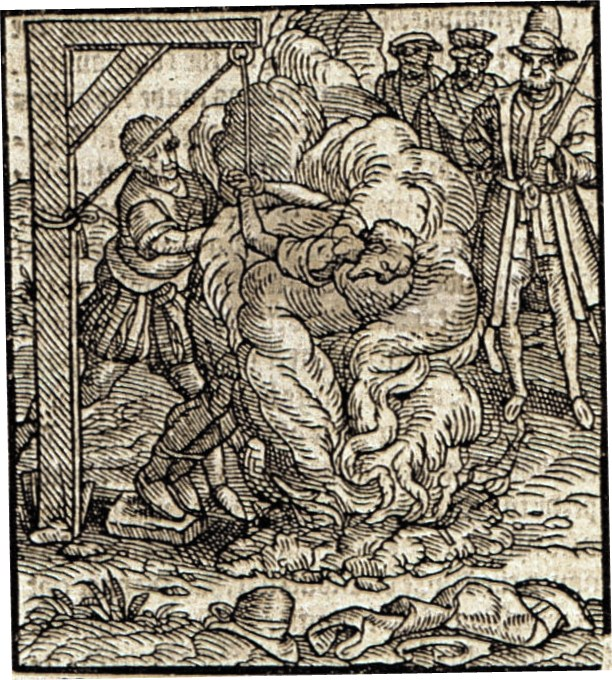
John Oldcastle being burnt for insurrection and Lollard heresy.

John Oldcastle, a close friend of Henry V of England and the basis for Falstaff in the Shakespearean history Henry IV, Part 1, was brought to trial in 1413 after evidence of his Lollard beliefs was uncovered. Oldcastle escaped from the Tower of London and organized an insurrection, which included an attempted kidnapping of the king. The rebellion failed, and Oldcastle was executed. Oldcastle's revolt made Lollardy seem even more threatening to the state, and persecution of Lollards became more severe.

=== 1428 Kentish Insurrection ===
An insurrection was nipped in the bud in 1428, feared to involve several thousand Lollards, intent on "destroying the English church." It was associated with Lollard missionary William White.

=== Late Lollardy in the 1500s ===
Lollards were effectively absorbed into Protestantism during the English Reformation, in which Lollardy played a role. Since Lollards had been underground for more than a hundred years, the extent of Lollardy and its ideas at the time of the Reformation is uncertain and a point of debate. Ancestors of Blanche Parry, the closest person to Elizabeth I for 56 years, and of Blanche Milborne, who raised Edward VI and Elizabeth I, had Lollard associations.

Many critics of the Reformation, including Thomas More, equated Protestants with Lollards. Leaders of the English Reformation, including Archbishop Thomas Cranmer, referred to Lollardy as well, and Bishop Cuthbert Tunstall of London called Lutheranism the "foster-child" of the Wycliffite heresy. Scholars debate whether Protestants actually drew influence from Lollardy, or whether they referred to it to create a sense of tradition. Late Lollards had little direct connection to Wycliffe's ideas.

Other martyrs for the Lollard cause were executed during the next century, including the Amersham Martyrs in the early 1500s and Thomas Harding in 1532, one of the last Lollards to be persecuted. A gruesome reminder of this persecution is the 'Lollards Pit' in Thorpe Wood, now Thorpe Hamlet, Norwich, Norfolk, "where men are customablie burnt", including Thomas Bilney.

Despite the debate about the extent of Lollard influence there are ample records of the persecution of Lollards from this period. In the Diocese of London, there are records of about 310 Lollards being prosecuted or forced to abjure from 1510 to 1532. In Lincoln diocese, 45 cases against Lollardy were heard in 1506–1507. In 1521, there were 50 abjurations and 5 burnings of Lollards. In 1511, Archbishop Warham presided over the abjuration of 41 Lollards from Kent and the burning of 5.

In 1529, Simon Fish wrote an incendiary pamphlet Supplication for the Beggars, including his denial of purgatory and teachings that priestly celibacy was an invention of the Antichrist. He argued that earthly rulers have the right to strip Church properties, and that tithing was against the Gospel, Protestant views that echo the Wycliffite/Lollard teaching. He advocated closing of all monasteries, and notably provided economic estimates of the revenues of various monastic and church institutions.

The extent of Lollardy in the general populace at this time is unknown. The prevalence of Protestant iconoclasm in England suggests Lollard ideas may still have had some popular influence if Huldrych Zwingli was not the source, as Lutheranism did not advocate iconoclasm. Lollards were persecuted again between 1554 and 1559 during the Revival of the Heresy Acts under the Catholic Mary I, which specifically suppressed heresy and Lollardy.

The similarity between Lollards and later English Protestant groups, such as the Baptists, Puritans, and Quakers, also suggests some continuation of Lollard ideas through the Reformation.

== Representations in art and literature ==
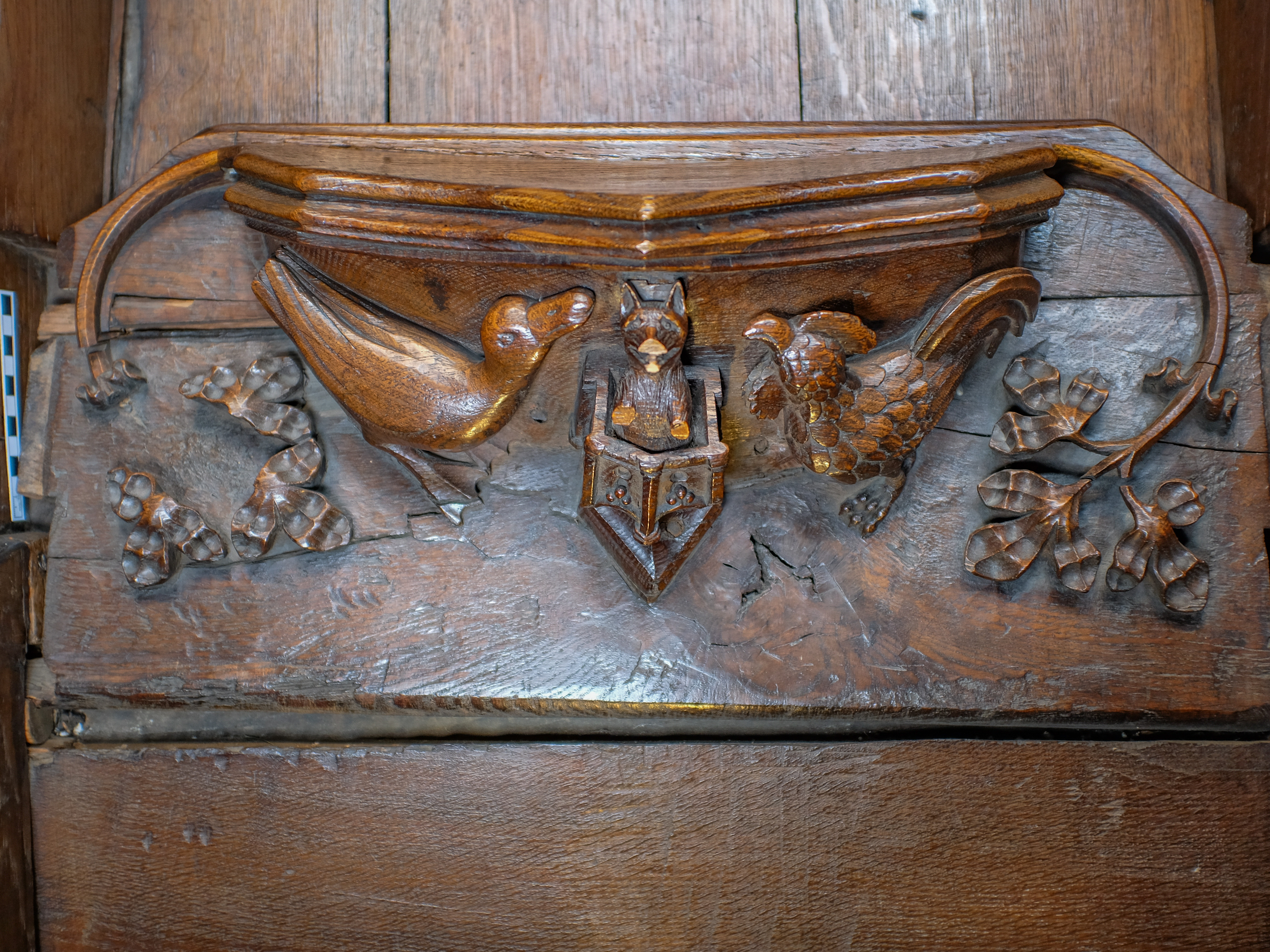
Fox preaching to the gullible fowl, a misericord (1491–1494), in the quire at Ripon Cathedral.

The Roman Catholic Church used art as an anti-Lollard weapon. Lollards were represented on misericords as foxes dressed as monks or priests preaching to a flock of geese. These representations alluded to the story of the preaching fox found in popular medieval literature such as The History of Reynard the Fox and The Shifts of Raynardine. The fox lured the geese closer and closer with its eloquent words, until it was able to snatch a victim to devour. The moral of the story is that foolish people are seduced by false teachers.

== See also ==
- Ecclesiae Regimen
- Euchites
- Hussites
- Lollard Disendowment Bill
- Margery Baxter
- Nicholas Love
- Piers Plowman
- Piers Plowman tradition
- Thomas Netter
- Waldensians
- William Langland

== General and cited references ==
- Aston, M. E. (1960). "Lollardy and Sedition 1381-1431". Past & Present (17): 1–44.
- Arnold, John H. (2019). "Voicing Dissent: Heresy Trials in Later Medieval England". Past and Present (245): 3–37. doi:10.1093/pastj/gtz025.
- Aston, Margaret E. (1984). Lollards and Reformers: Images and Literacy in Late Medieval Religion. London: Hambledon Press. ISBN 978-0907628187.
- Aston, Margaret E.; Richmond, Colin F., eds. (1997). Lollardy and the Gentry in the Late Middle Ages. Stroud: Sutton. ISBN 978-0312173883.
- Dickens, A. G. (1989). The English Reformation (2nd ed.). Pennsylvania: Pennsylvania State University Press. ISBN 978-0271028682.
- Duffy, Eamon (1992). The Stripping of the Altars. New Haven: Yale University Press. ISBN 978-0300108286.
- Forrest, Ian (2005). The Detection of Heresy in Late Medieval England. Oxford: Oxford University Press. ISBN 978-0199286928.
- Hudson, Anne M. (1988). "The Ideology of Reformation". The Premature Reformation: Wycliffite Texts and Lollard History. Oxford: Clarendon Press. ISBN 978-0198227625.
- Lowe, Ben (2004). "Teaching in the 'Schole of Christ': Law, Learning, and Love in Early Lollard Pacifism". Catholic Historical Review. 90 (3): 405–38. doi:10.1353/cat.2004.0142. S2CID 153795536..
- Lutton, Robert (2006). Lollardy and Orthodox Religion in Pre-Reformation England. Woodbridge: Boydell and Brewer. ISBN 978-1843836490.
- McFarlane, K. B. (1952). John Wycliffe and the Beginnings of English Nonconformity. London: English Universities Press. ISBN 978-0340166482.
- McSheffrey, Shannon; Tanner, Norman P., eds. (2003). Lollards of Coventry, 1486–1522. Royal Historical Society, Camden, Fifth Series, 23. Cambridge: Cambridge University Press. ISBN 9780521830836. OCLC 799426323.
- McSheffrey, Shannon (2005). "Heresy, Orthodoxy and English Vernacular Religion 1480–1525". Past and Present (186): 47–80. doi:10.1093/pastj/gti001. JSTOR 3600851.
- Rex, Richard (2002). The Lollards: Social History in Perspective. New York: Palgrave. ISBN 978-0333597521.
- Robson, John Adam (1961). Wyclif and the Oxford Schools: The Relation of the "Summa de Ente" to Scholastic Debates at Oxford in the Later Fourteenth Century. Cambridge: Cambridge University Press. ISBN 978-0521089326.
- Spufford, Margaret, ed. (1995). The World of Rural Dissenters, 1520–1725. Cambridge: Cambridge University Press. ISBN 978-0521410618.
- Thomson, John A. F. (1965). The Later Lollards, 1414–1520. Oxford: Oxford University Press. ISBN 978-0198213765.
