= John Wycliffe =

English Catholic priest and philosopher (1328–1384)

The Reverend John Wycliffe
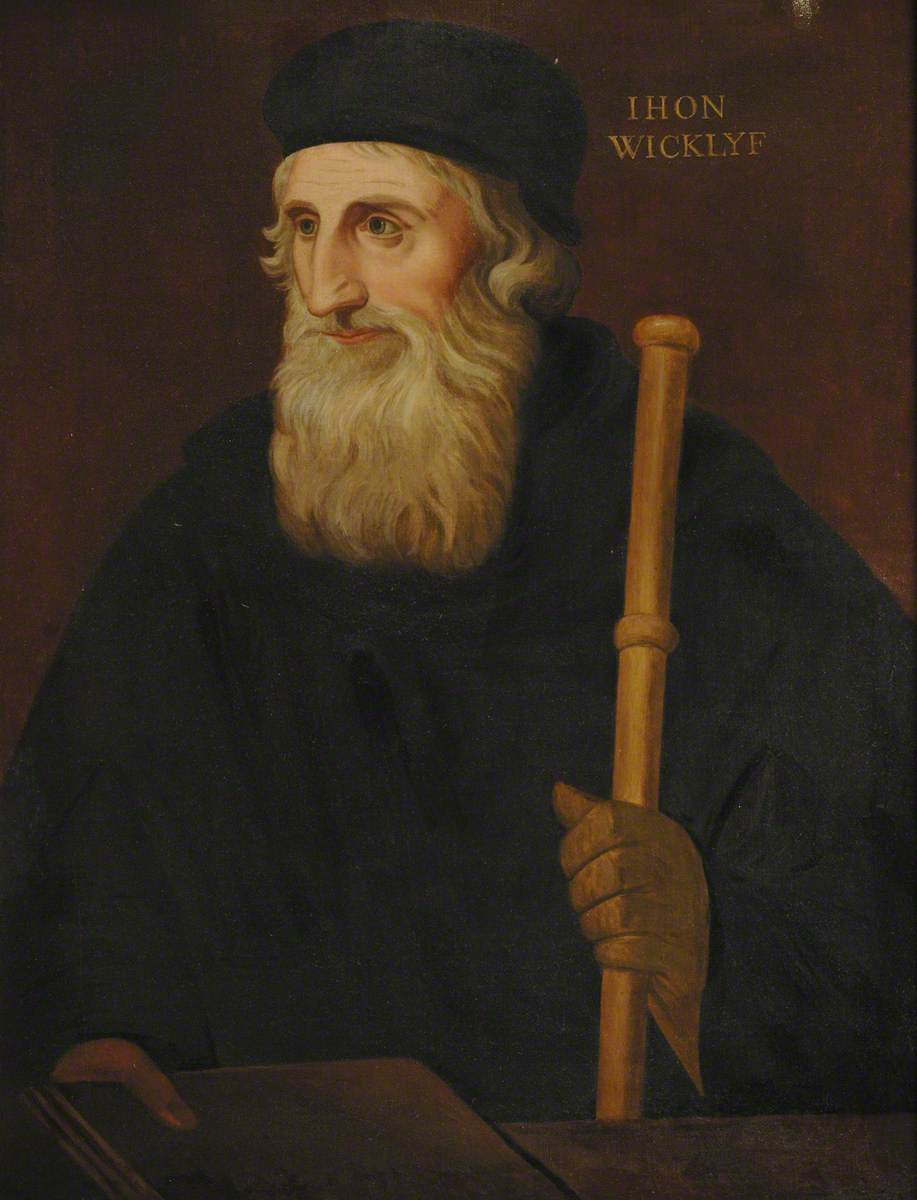
- Portrait by Thomas Kirkby, c. 1828
- Born: c. 1328; Hipswell, Yorkshire, England
- Died: 31 December 1384 (aged 56); Lutterworth, Leicestershire, England
- Occupations: Scholastic philosopher, priest and theology professor

Education
- Education: Merton College, Oxford (B.A.)

Philosophical work
- Era: Medieval philosophy
- Region: Western philosophy
- School: Scholasticism
- Main interests: Theology
- Notable works: Wycliffe's Bible (attributed)

John Wycliffe (/ˈwɪklɪf/; also spelled Wyclif, Wickliffe, Wicklyf etc.; (Note: In Latin, Ioannes Wiclefus.) c. 1328 – 31 December 1384) was an English scholastic philosopher, Christian reformer, Catholic priest, and a theology professor at the University of Oxford. Wycliffe is traditionally believed to have advocated for or made a vernacular translation of the Vulgate Bible into Middle English, though more recent scholarship has minimised the extent of his advocacy or involvement for lack of direct contemporary evidence.

He became an influential dissident within the Catholic priesthood during the 14th century and his ideas are often considered an important predecessor to Protestantism. His political-theological theory of dominion meant that the church was not allowed to own property or have ecclesiastic courts, and men in mortal sin were not entitled to exercise authority in the church or state, nor to own property. Wycliffe insisted on the radical poverty of all clergy.

Wycliffe has been characterised as the "evening star" of scholasticism and as the "morning star" or stella matutina of the English Reformation.

Certain of Wycliffe's later followers, derogatorily called Lollards by their orthodox contemporaries in the 15th and 16th centuries, adopted a number of the beliefs attributed to Wycliffe such as theological virtues, predestination, iconoclasm, and the notion of caesaropapism, with some questioning the veneration of saints, the sacraments, requiem masses, transubstantiation, monasticism, and the legitimacy or role of the Papacy. Wycliffe's writings in Latin greatly influenced the philosophy and teaching of the Czech reformer Jan Hus (c. 1369–1415).

== Life and career ==
=== Early life ===
Wycliffe was born in the village of Hipswell, near Richmond in the North Riding of Yorkshire, England, although there is some dispute about the date. He has conventionally been given a birth date of 1324 but Hudson and Kenny state only records "suggest he was born in the mid-1320s" and Conti states that he was born "after 1331".

Wycliffe received his early education close to his home. It is unknown when he first came to Oxford, with which he was so closely connected until the end of his life, but he is known to have been at Oxford around 1345. Thomas Bradwardine was the Archbishop of Canterbury and his book On the Cause of God Against the Pelagians, a bold recovery of the Pauline–Augustinian doctrine of grace, greatly shaped young Wycliffe's views, as did the Black Death, which reached England in the summer of 1348. From his frequent references to it in later life it appears to have made a deep and abiding impression upon him. According to Robert Vaughn, the effect was to give Wycliffe "very gloomy views in regard to the condition and prospects of the human race". In September 1351, Wycliffe became a priest. Wycliffe would have been at Oxford during the St Scholastica Day riot, in which sixty-three students and a number of townspeople were killed.

=== Career in education ===
In 1356, Wycliffe completed his bachelor of arts degree at Merton College as a junior fellow. That same year he produced a small treatise, The Last Age of the Church. In the light of the virulence of the plague, which had subsided seven years previously, Wycliffe's studies led him to the opinion that the close of the 14th century would mark the end of the world. While other writers viewed the plague as God's judgement on sinful people, Wycliffe saw it as an indictment of an unworthy clergy. The mortality rate among the clergy had been particularly high and those who replaced them were, in his opinion, uneducated or generally disreputable.

In 1361, he was Master of Balliol College in Oxford. That year he was presented by the college to the parish of Fillingham in Lincolnshire, which he visited rarely during long vacations from Oxford. For this he had to give up the headship of Balliol College, though he could continue to live at Oxford. He is said to have had rooms in the buildings of The Queen's College. In 1362, he was granted a prebend at Aust in Westbury-on-Trym, which he held in addition to the post at Fillingham.

In 1365, his performance led Simon Islip, Archbishop of Canterbury, to place him at the head of Canterbury Hall, where twelve young men were preparing for the priesthood. In December 1365, Islip appointed Wycliffe as warden, but when Islip died in 1366, his successor, Simon Langham, a man of monastic training, turned the leadership of the college over to a monk. In 1367, Wycliffe's appeal to Rome was refused in 1371. The incident was typical of the ongoing rivalry between monks or friars and secular clergy at Oxford at this time.

In 1368, he gave up his living at Fillingham and took over the rectory of Ludgershall, Buckinghamshire, not far from Oxford, which enabled him to retain his connection with the university. Tradition has it that he began his translation of the Bible into English while sitting in a room above what is now the porch in Ludgershall Church. In 1369, Wycliffe obtained a bachelor's degree in theology, and his doctorate in 1372. In 1374, he received the crown living of St Mary's Church, Lutterworth in Leicestershire, which he retained until his death.

=== Politics ===
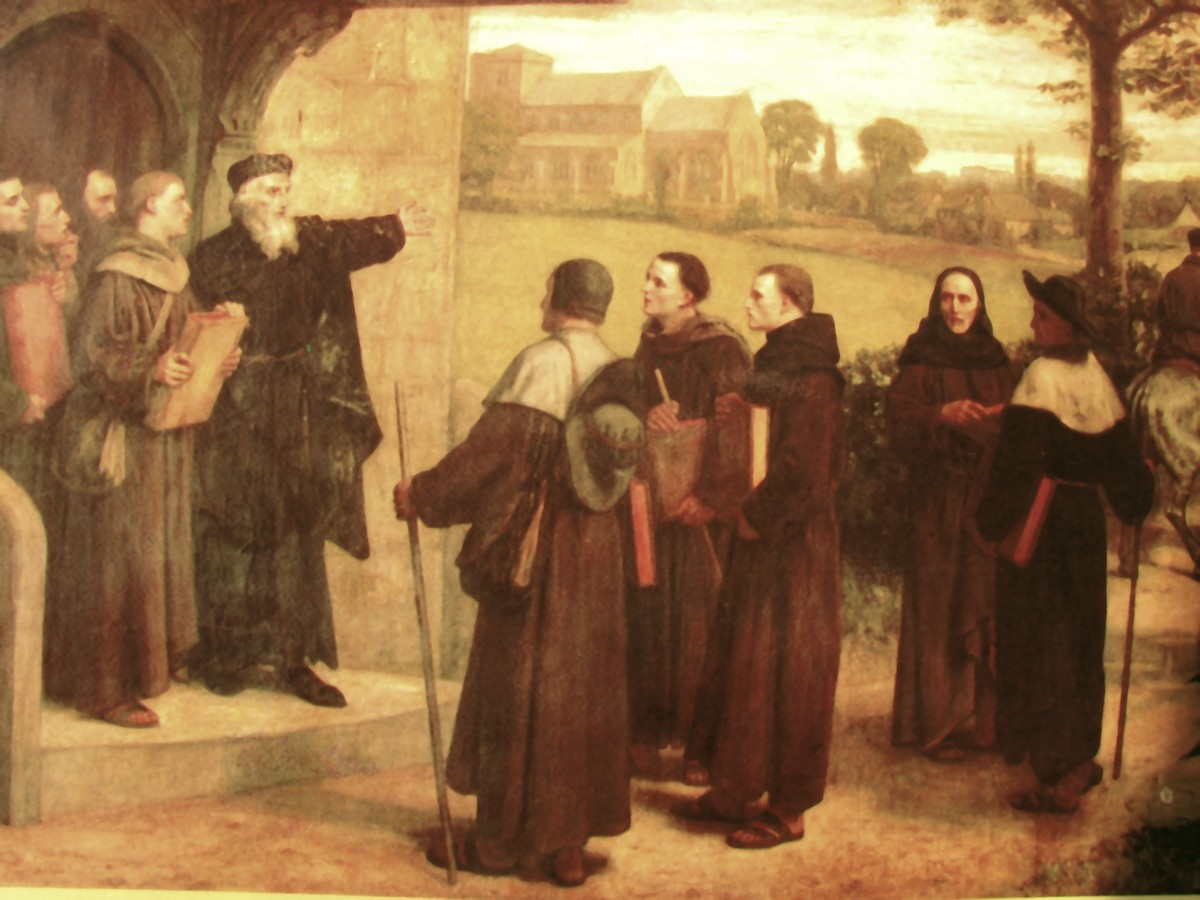
Wyclif Giving 'The Poor Priests' His Translation of the Bible by William Frederick Yeames, published before 1923.

In 1374, Wycliffe's was part of a group negotiating in Bruges on behalf of the English Government with Gregory XI's papal envoys on a number of disputed points between the king and the pope which may have started his connection with the Duke of Lancaster John of Gaunt, a powerful magnate and power broker who was the third son of King Edward III, although that connection may have started as early as 1371. Soon after his return from Bruges he began to write tracts and longer works, being no longer satisfied with just using his college chair to promote his ideas. In his book De civili dominio ("On Civil Dominion"), concerning the government of God and the Ten Commandments, he attacked the temporal rule of the clergy, the collection of annates, indulgences, and simony.

According to the English Catholic historian Francis Aidan Gasquet, at least some of Wycliffe's program should be seen as (naive) "attempts at social reconstruction" in the aftermath of the continuing institutional chaos after the Black Death (1347–1349).

==== De civili dominio ====
Wycliffe entered the politics of the day with his great work De civili dominio ("On Civil Dominion"), which drew arguments from the works of Richard FitzRalph. This called for the royal divestment of all church property. Wycliffe argued that the Church had fallen into sin and that it ought therefore to give up all its property, and that the clergy must live in poverty. The tendency of the high offices of state to be held by clerics was resented by powerful nobles such as John of Gaunt whose power was challenged by the wealth and power of the clergy while also believing that church wealth could fund the government's military needs.

==== Conflicts with Church, State and University ====
In 1377, Wycliffe's ideas on lordship and church wealth caused his first official condemnation by Pope Gregory XI, who censured 19 articles of De civili dominio. He was summoned before William Courtenay, Bishop of London, to a convocation on 19 February 1377 at St Paul's Cathedral. The exact charges are not known, as the matter did not get as far as a definite examination. Lechler suggests that Wycliffe was targeted by John of Gaunt's opponents among the nobles and church hierarchy. Gaunt, the Earl Marshal Henry Percy, and a number of other armed supporters accompanied Wycliffe. A hostile crowd gathered at the church, and at the entrance, party animosities began to show, and there was an angry exchange between the Bishop of London and John of Gaunt about whether Wycliffe could sit.

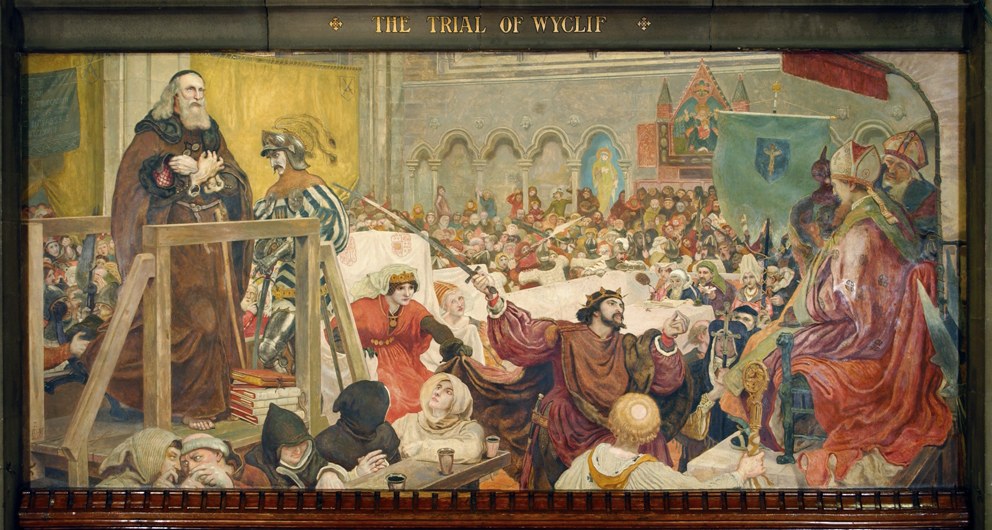
Mural depicting trial of the 19 February 1377. One of The Manchester Murals by Ford Madox Brown. Gaunt is shown confronting William Courtenay while a barefoot Wycliffe looks on. Geoffrey Chaucer is depicted as one of the scribes.

Gaunt declared that he would humble the pride of the English clergy and their partisans, hinting at the intent to secularise the possessions of the Church. The assembly broke up and Gaunt and his partisans departed with their protégé. Anti-Gaunt riots followed the next day in London. Most of the English clergy were irritated by this encounter, and attacks upon Wycliffe began.

Wycliffe's second and third books dealing with civil government carry a sharp polemic.

On 22 May 1377, Pope Gregory XI sent five copies of a bull against Wycliffe, dispatching one to the Archbishop of Canterbury, and the others to the Bishop of London, King Edward III, the Chancellor, and the university. Among the enclosures were 18 theses of his, which were denounced as erroneous and dangerous to Church and State: all were drawn from De Civili dominio.

Stephen Lahey suggests that Gregory's action against Wycliffe was an attempt to put pressure on King Edward to make peace with France. Edward III died on 21 June 1377, and the bull against Wycliffe did not reach England before December. Wycliffe was asked to give the king's council his opinion on whether it was lawful to withhold traditional payments to Rome, and he responded that it was.

Back at Oxford, the Vice-Chancellor confined Wycliffe for some time in Black Hall, but his friends soon obtained his release.

In March 1378, Wycliffe was summoned to appear at Lambeth Palace to defend himself. However, Sir Lewis Clifford entered the chapel and in the name of the queen mother (Joan of Kent), forbade the bishops to proceed to a definite sentence concerning Wycliffe's conduct or opinions. Wycliffe wrote a letter expressing and defending his less "obnoxious doctrines". The bishops, who were divided, satisfied themselves with forbidding him to speak further on the controversy.

==== De incarcerandis fidelibus ====
Wycliffe wrote De incarcerandis fidelibus (“On the Incarceration of the Faithful”), a late polemical treatise opposing the use of imprisonment as a coercive instrument of ecclesiastical discipline. The work is commonly described as consisting of thirty-three conclusions transmitted in both Latin and English, although modern scholarship is not uniform in describing the precise relationship between the two versions: no works that Wycliff wrote or preached in English are now known.

In the treatise, Wycliffe argued that incarceration should not be regarded as a legitimate or lawful consequence of excommunication and that coercive penalties imposed by church authorities exceeded their proper spiritual jurisdiction. He further maintained that those who were excommunicated or imprisoned unjustly should be permitted to seek redress through secular authority, including appeal to the king and his council, reflecting his broader view that temporal power had a corrective role when ecclesiastical authority was abused.

Wycliffe’s opposition to clerical imprisonment and his appeal to royal oversight are consistent with arguments found elsewhere in his political theology, particularly in works addressing the duties of kingship and the limits of ecclesiastical power.

Some ordinary citizens, some of the nobility, and his former protector, John of Gaunt, rallied to him. Before any further steps could be taken in Rome, Gregory XI died in 1378.

==== De officio regis ====
Wycliffe's stance against the papacy grew ever more extreme moving from respect to outright opposition. Wycliffe's stand concerning the ideal of poverty became continually firmer, as well as his position with regard to the temporal rule of the clergy.

Closely related to this attitude was his book De officio regis, the content of which had been foreshadowed in his 33 conclusions: for example, that a trial before Parliament and Synod was necessary for excommunication, that the King should (intervene and) not authorise imprisonment as a sentence for excommunication. This book, like those that preceded and followed, was concerned with the reform of the Church, in which the temporal arm was to have an influential part.

From 1380 onwards, Wycliffe devoted himself to writings that argued his rejection of transubstantiation, and strongly criticised the friars who supported it.

=== Anti-Wycliffe synod ===
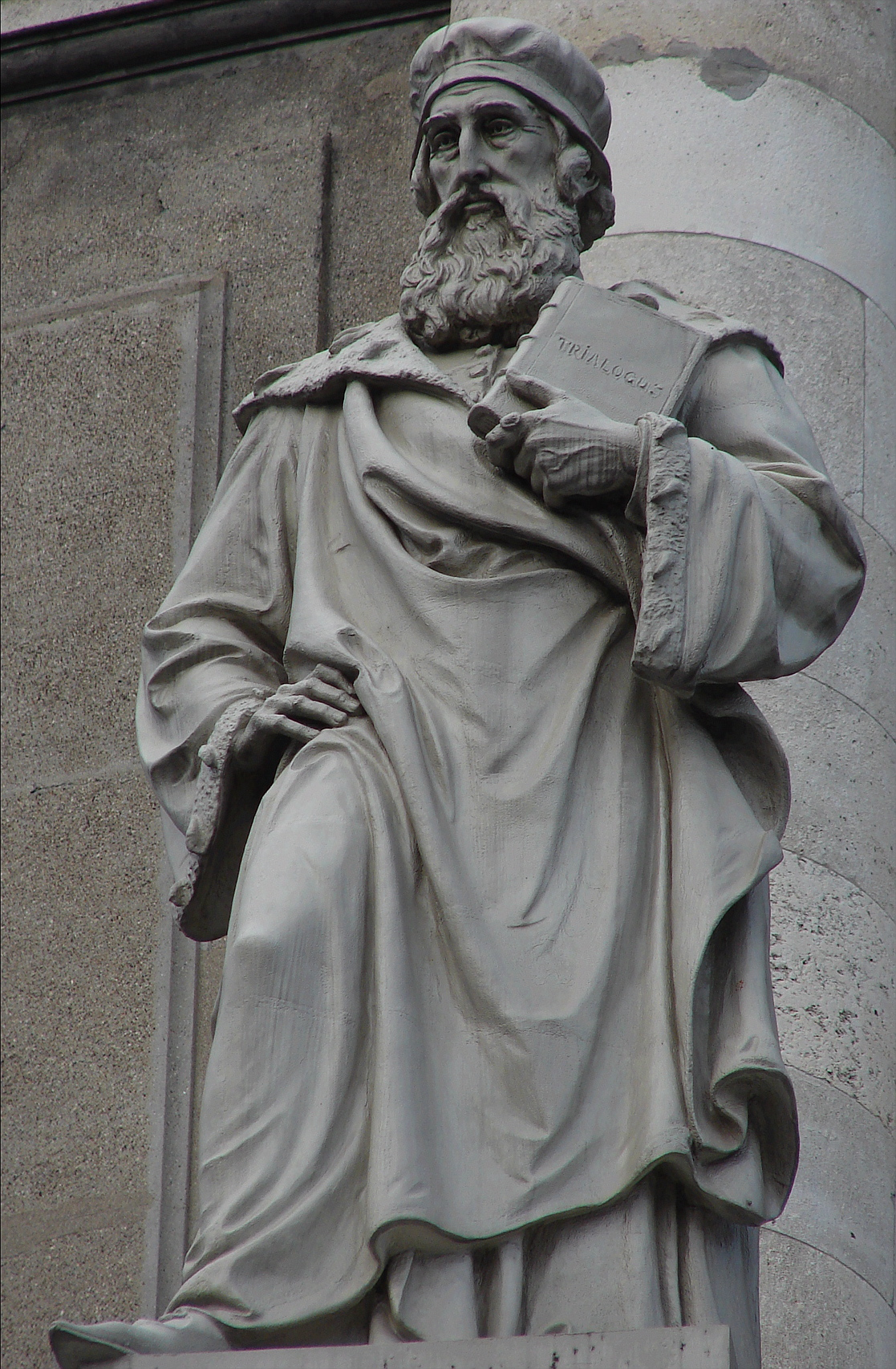
Statue of Wycliffe on Frederick's Church, Copenhagen

In the summer of 1381, Wycliffe formulated his doctrine of the Lord's Supper in twelve short sentences, and made it a duty to advocate it everywhere. Then the English hierarchy launched proceedings against him. The chancellor of the University of Oxford had some of the declarations pronounced heretical. When this was announced to Wycliffe, he declared that no one could change his convictions. He then appealed – not to the pope or the ecclesiastical authorities of the land, but to the king. He published his great confession upon the subject, and a second writing in English intended for the common people.

As long as Wycliffe limited his attacks to abuses and the wealth of the Church, he could rely on the support of part of the clergy and aristocracy, but once he dismissed the traditional doctrine of transubstantiation, his theses could not be defended any more. This view cost him the support of John of Gaunt and many others.

In the midst of this came the Peasants' Revolt of 1381. The revolt was sparked in part by Wycliffe's preaching, carried throughout the realm by "poor priests" or "poor preachers" appointed by Wycliffe, and mostly laymen. A contemporary record claims local sympathetic knights would force local people to hear the preaching, sometimes acting as armed guards in the parish church to prevent disputation. The preachers didn't limit their criticism of the accumulation of wealth and property to that of the monasteries, but included secular properties belonging to the nobility. Although Wycliffe disapproved of the revolt, some of his disciples justified the killing of Simon Sudbury, Archbishop of Canterbury.

In 1382, Wycliffe's old enemy William Courtenay, now Archbishop of Canterbury, called an ecclesiastical assembly of notables at London. During the consultations on 21 May an earthquake occurred. The participants were terrified and wished to break up the assembly, but Courtenay declared the earthquake a favourable sign, which meant the purification of the earth from erroneous doctrine, and the result of the "Earthquake Synod" was assured.

Of the 24 propositions attributed to Wycliffe without mentioning his name, ten were declared heretical and fourteen erroneous. The former had reference to the transformation in the sacrament, the latter to matters of church order and institutions. It was forbidden from that time to hold these opinions or to advance them in sermons or in academic discussions. All persons disregarding this order were to be subject to prosecution. To accomplish this, the help of the State was necessary, but the Commons rejected the bill. The king, however, had a decree issued which permitted the arrest of those in error.

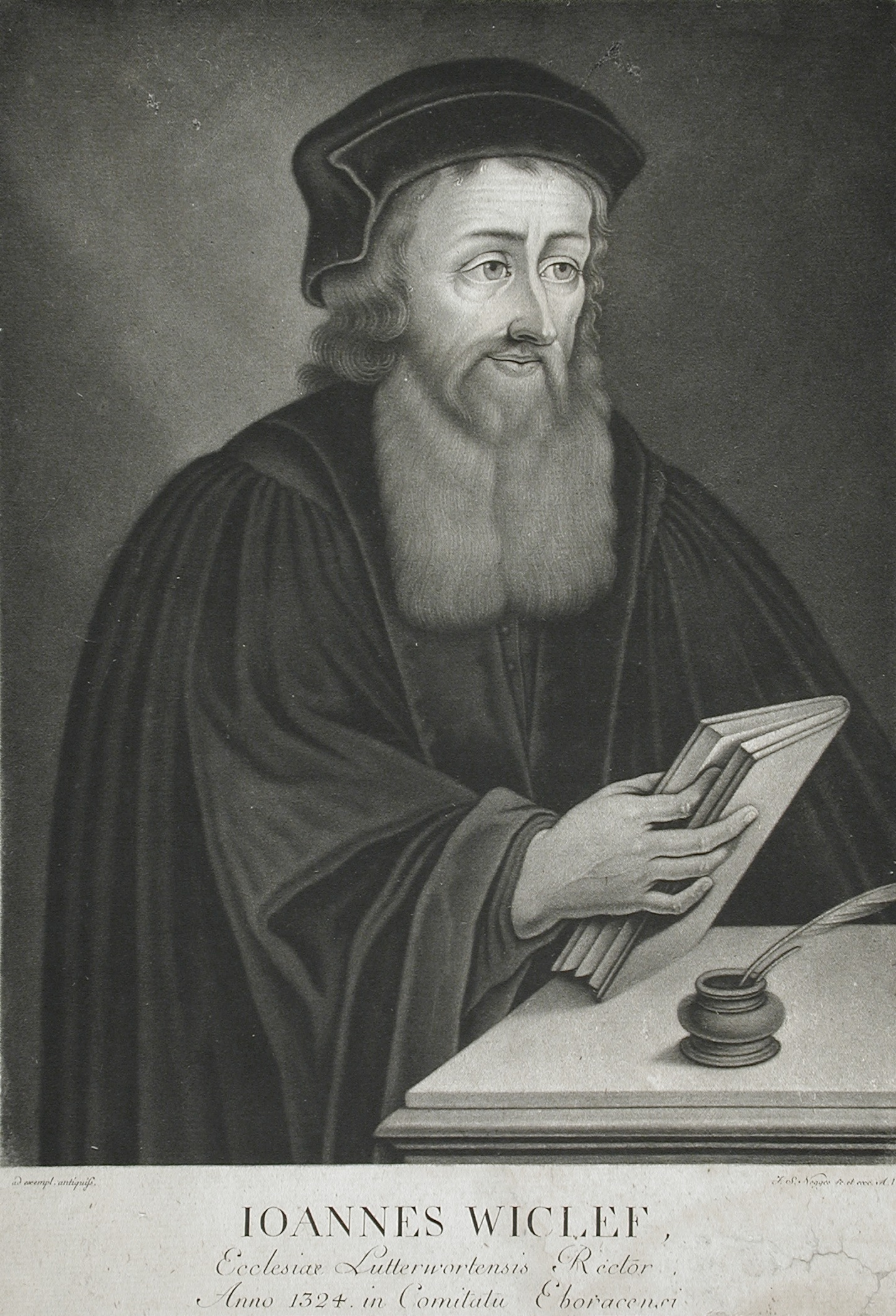

The citadel of the reformatory movement was Oxford, where Wycliffe's most active helpers were. The ban applied to them and they were summoned to recant. Nicholas of Hereford went to Rome to appeal.

On 17 November 1382, Wycliffe was summoned before a synod at Oxford. He still commanded the favour of the court and of Parliament, to which he addressed a memorial. In 1383 he was summonsed to Rome, but he suffered a debilitating stroke and was excused from travel. He was neither excommunicated then, nor deprived of his living.

Wycliffe aimed to do away with the existing hierarchy and replace it with the "poor priests" who lived in poverty, were bound by no vows, had received no formal consecration, and preached the Gospel to the people. Itinerant preachers spread the teachings of Wycliffe. The bull of Gregory XI impressed upon them the name of Lollards, intended as an opprobrious epithet, but it became, to them, a name of honour. Even in Wycliffe's time the "Lollards" had reached wide circles in England and preached "God's law, without which no one could be justified." Furthermore, not all anti-clerical people were Lollards, not all Lollards were Wycliffites, and not all productions attributed to Wycliffites were anti-Catholic, despite later conflation.

=== Death and posthumous declaration of heresy ===
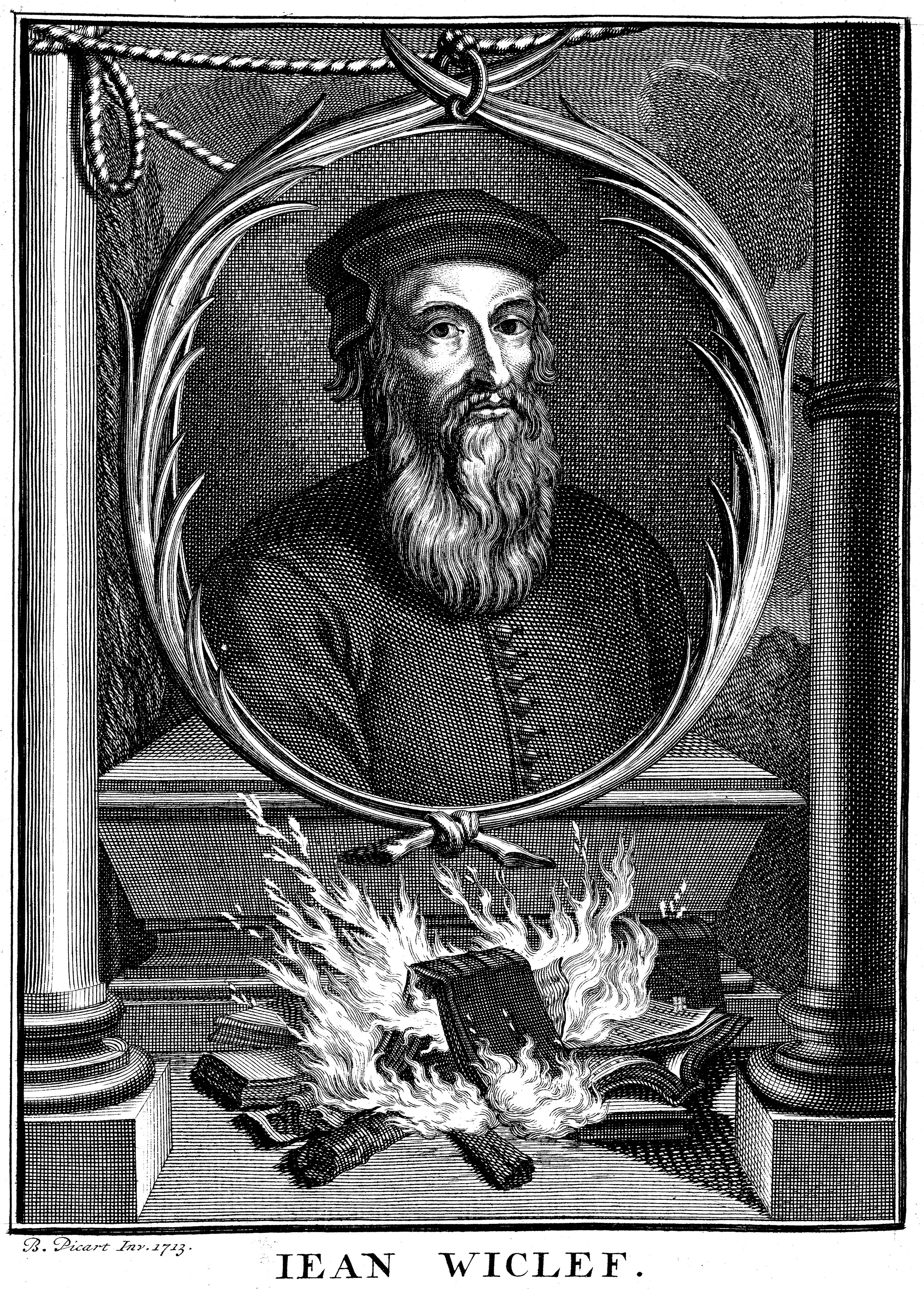
Portrait of John Wycliffe by Bernard Picart, showing the burning of his works (1714)

In the years before his death in 1384 he increasingly argued for Scriptures as the authoritative centre of Christianity, that the claims of the papacy were unhistorical, that monasticism was irredeemably corrupt, and that the moral unworthiness of priests invalidated their office and sacraments.

Wycliffe returned to Lutterworth. From there he sent out tracts against the monks and Pope Urban VI. Urban VI, contrary to Wycliffe's hopes, had not turned out to be a reforming pope. The literary achievements of Wycliffe's last days, such as the Trialogus, stand at the peak of the knowledge of his day. His last work, the Opus evangelicum, the last part of which he named in characteristic fashion "Of Antichrist", remained uncompleted. While he was saying Mass in the parish church on Holy Innocents' Day, 28 December 1384, he suffered a stroke, and died a few days later. He started to be venerated as a local saint; some Bohemian followers "even took a piece of his tomb to Prague, where it was worshipped as a relic."

The anti-Lollard statute of 1401 De heretico comburendo classed heresy as a form of sedition or treason, and ordered that Lollard books, frequently associated with Wycliffe, be handed over and burnt; someone who refused and would not abjure could be burnt. The "Constitutions of Oxford" of 1408 established rules in Oxford University, and specifically named John Wycliffe as a Lollard and his writings as heretical; it decreed that new translation efforts of Scripture into English should be first authorised by a Bishop.

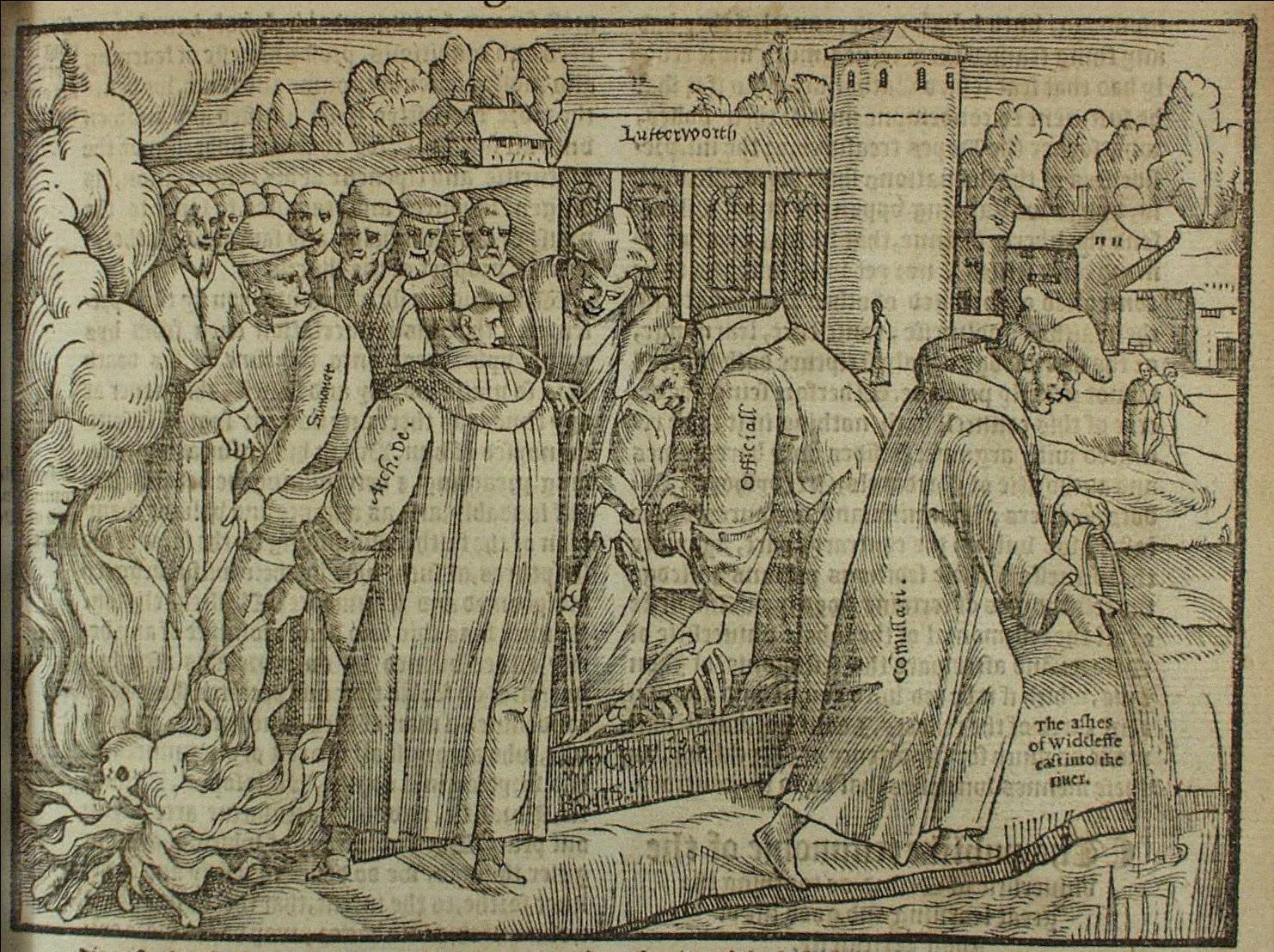
Burning Wycliffe's bones, from Foxe's Book of Martyrs (1563)

The Council of Constance declared Wycliffe a heretic on 4 May 1415, and banned his writings. The Council decreed that Wycliffe's works should be burned and his bodily remains removed from consecrated church ground, following the customary logic that heretics had put themselves outside the church. This order, confirmed by Pope Martin V, was eventually carried out in 1428. Wycliffe's corpse, or a neighbour's, was exhumed; unusually, on the orders of the bishop the remains were burned and the ashes drowned in the River Swift, which flows through Lutterworth.

None of Wycliffe's contemporaries left a complete picture of his person, his life, and his activities. Paintings representing Wycliffe are from a later period. In The Testimony of William Thorpe (1407) (possibly apocryphal), Wycliffe appears wasted and physically weak. Thorpe says Wycliffe was of unblemished walk in life, and regarded affectionately by people of rank, who often consorted with him, took down his sayings, and clung to him. "I indeed clove to none closer than to him, the wisest and most blessed of all men whom I have ever found."

== Works ==
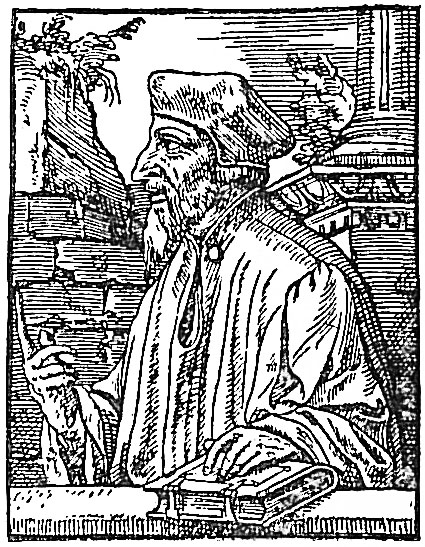
John Wycliffe portrayed in Bale's Scriptor Majoris Britanniæ (1548)

Wycliffe is said to have written about two hundred works in Latin and Middle English. There are few experts in 14th-century scholastic Latin, and many of Wycliffe's Latin works have not been translated into English, which has limited their study by historians. His theological and political works include numerous books and tracts:

- The Last Age of the Church (1356) attrib.
- De Logica ("On Logic") 1360
- De Universalibus ("On Universals") 1368
- De Dominio Divino (1373)
- De Mandatis Divinis (1375)
- De Statu Innocencie (1376)
- De Civili Dominio (1377)
- De Officio Regis
- Responsio (1377)
- De veritate sacrae scripturae ("On the Truthfulness of Holy Scripture") 1378
- On the Pastoral Office 1378
- De apostasia ("On Apostasy") 1379
- De Eucharistia ("On the Eucharist") 1379
- Objections to Friars (1380)
- Trialogus – four books (c 1381–83)

Most historians hold that few to none of the Middle English works (tracts) ascribed to Wycliffe can be confidently attributed to him, in contrast to the Latin works, with the possible exception of six: On the Pastoral Office, On the Pope, On the Church and Her Members, Of Confession, Of Pseudo-Friars, and Of Dominion.

A large number of sermons ascribed to him, about 250 in Middle English and 170 in Latin, survive.

=== Middle English Bibles ===
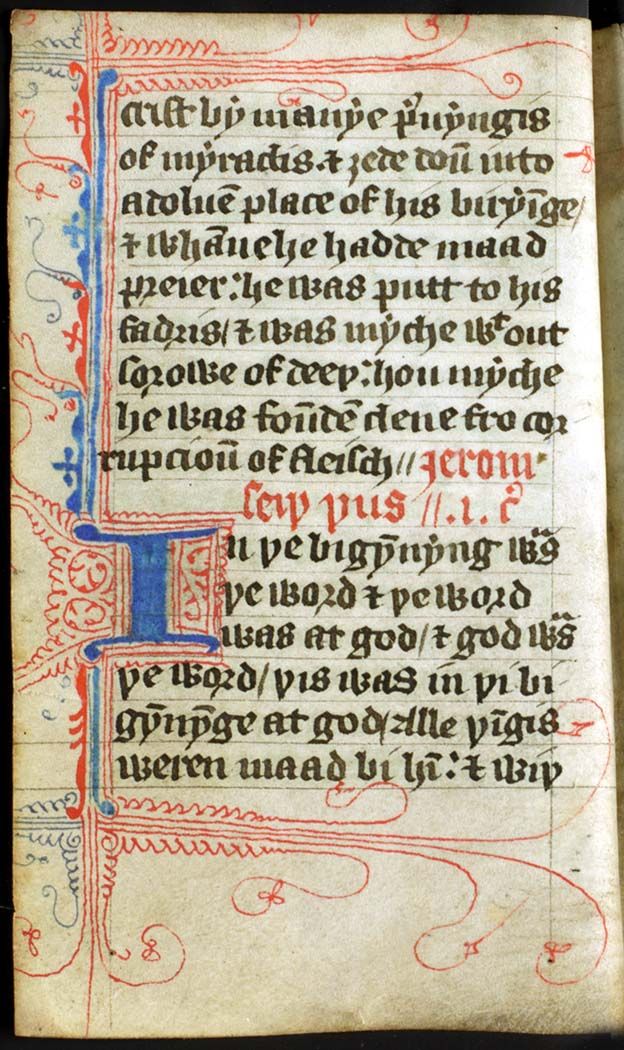
John 1 from a manuscript of Wycliffe's Bible

According to tradition Wycliffe is said to have completed a translation direct from the Vulgate into Middle English – a version now known as Wycliffe's Bible. He may have personally translated the Gospels of Matthew, Mark, Luke and John but it is possible he initially translated the entire New Testament Early Version. It is assumed that his associates translated the Old Testament and revised the Late Version. Wycliffe's Bible appears to have been completed prior to 1384, with additional updated versions being done by Wycliffe's assistant John Purvey, and others, in 1388 and 1395. More recently historians of the Wycliffite movement have suggested that Wycliffe had at most a minor role in the actual translations or contributed ad hoc passages taken from his English theological writings, with some, building on the earlier theories of Francis Aidan Gasquet, going as far as to suggest he had no role in the translations other than the translation projects perhaps being inspired, at least partially, by Wycliffe's biblicism at Oxford, but otherwise being orthodox Catholic translations later co-opted by his followers.

In keeping with Wycliffe's belief that scripture was the only authoritative reliable guide to the truth about God, he is said to have become involved in efforts to translate the Bible into English. However, while Wycliffe is popularly credited, it is not possible exactly to define his part, if any, in the translations, which were based on the Vulgate.

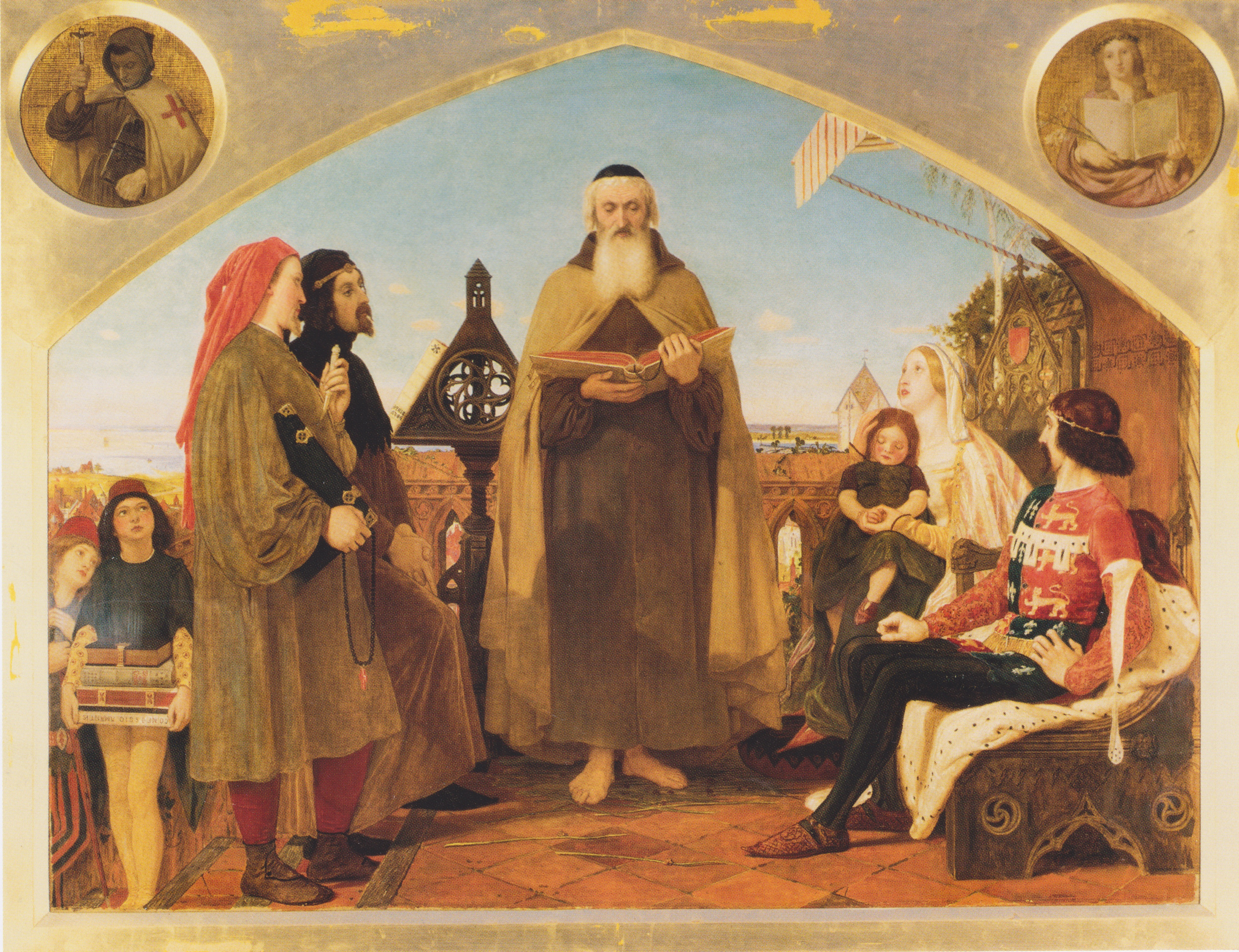
Wycliffe reading his Bible to John of Gaunt, by Ford Madox Brown in the Cartwright Hall Gallery, Bradford

In common belief from only decades after the translations, it was his initiative, and the success of the project was due to his leadership. For the initial Early Version (EV), the rendering of the Old Testament is attributed to his friend Nicholas of Hereford; the rendering of some of the New Testament has been traditionally attributed to Wycliffe. The whole was revised perhaps by Wycliffe's younger contemporary John Purvey in 1388, known as the Late Version (LV). Linguistic analysis, however, suggests there were multiple translators for both EV and LV translations.

There still exist over 200 manuscripts, complete or partial, mainly containing the translation in its LV form. From this, it is possible to infer that texts were widely diffused in the 15th century. For this reason, the Wycliffites in England were often designated by their opponents as "Bible men"; it has been noted, however, that the vocabulary in English Wycliffite sermons doesn't typically match that found in the EV or LV.

== Doctrines ==
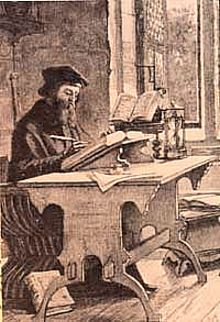
Wycliffe at work in his study

Historian S. Harrison Thomson notes that Wycliff's theology was on a broader canvas than the continental reformation: however of the major Protestant notes, it is difficult to find justification by faith alone or the priesthood of all believers espoused in his works.

It is right for God to have two vicars in His church, namely a king in temporal affairs, and a priest in spiritual. The king should strongly check rebellion, as did God in the Old Testament, while priests ought minister the precepts mildly, as did Christ, who was at once priest and king.”

— John Wyciffe, De Officio Regis

And while Wycliffe certainly advocated "the supremacy of scripture over tradition", no reformer adopted his view that every verse in Scripture was in some way literally true. According to popular history, Wycliffe had come to regard the scriptures as the only reliable guide to the truth about God, and maintained that all Christians should rely on the Bible rather than on the teachings of popes and clerics. He said that there was no scriptural justification for the papacy or special courts for religious (e.g., monks) or the clergy (e.g., priests).

Theologically, his preaching expressed a strong belief in a kind of predestination that enabled him to declare an "invisible church of the elect", made up of those predestined to be saved, rather than in the "visible" Catholic Church. To Wycliffe, the Church was the totality of those who are predestined to blessedness. No one who is eternally lost has part in it. There is one universal Church, and outside of it there is no salvation.

His first tracts and greater works of ecclesiastical-political content defended the privileges of the State. By 1379 in his De ecclesia ("On the Church"), Wycliffe clearly claimed the supremacy of the king over the priesthood. He accepted the existence of purgatory but not the usefulness of intercession for the saved in purgatory. He also rejected the selling of indulgences.

=== Attack on monasticism ===
The battle against what he saw as an imperialised papacy and its supporters, the "sects", as he called the monastic orders, takes up a large space not only in his later works, such as the Trialogus, Dialogus, Opus evangelicum, and in his sermons, but also in a series of sharp tracts and polemical productions in Latin and English (of which those issued in his later years have been collected as "Polemical Writings").

In the 1380 Objections to Friars, he calls monks the pests of society, enemies of religion, and patrons and promoters of every crime. He directed his strongest criticism against the friars, whose preaching he considered neither scriptural nor sincere, but motivated by "temporal gain". While others were content to seek the reform of particular errors and abuses, Wycliffe sought nothing less than the extinction of the institution itself, as being repugnant to scripture and his theology of apostolic poverty, and inconsistent with the order and prosperity of the Church. He advocated the dissolution of the monasteries.

But any one who looks even cursorily through these volumes will at once perceive that they exhibit everywhere a vehement and uncompromising spirit, — a spirit which menaced what it attacked, not with reform, but with destruction. The feeling of Wyclif towards the friars seems to have amounted to positive hatred ...: he calls upon lords and gentlemen to unite with the reforming clergy in suppressing the friars altogether. Not one redeeming feature is allowed them; not a single ray of light relieves the awful shadows of the portrait which he draws of them. The superior clergy, — bishops, deans, and archdeacons, — the various orders of monks, and the canons secular and regular, of whom there were at that time numerous communities in England, are all denounced with nearly equal bitterness, and with as little allowance for any good qualities which they might possess. Now, that the portrait which Wyclif draws of his adversaries is an entirely fair and truthful one, cannot seem probable to any reasonable man.

— Thomas Arnold (editor) Selected Works of John Wyclif (3 vols)

=== Views on the papacy ===
Rudolph Buddensieg finds two distinct aspects in Wycliffe's work. The first, from 1366 to 1378, reflects a political struggle with Rome, while 1378 to 1384 is more a religious struggle. In each Wycliffe has two approaches: he attacks both the Papacy and its institutions, and also Roman Catholic doctrine.

Wycliffe's influence was never greater than at the moment when pope and antipope sent their ambassadors to England to gain recognition for themselves. In 1378, in the ambassadors' presence, he delivered an opinion before Parliament that showed, in an important ecclesiastical political question (the matter of the right of asylum in Westminster Abbey), a position that was to the liking of the State. He argued that criminals who had taken sanctuary in churches might lawfully be dragged out of sanctuary.

The books and tracts of Wycliffe's last six years include continual attacks upon the papacy and the entire hierarchy of his times. Each year they focus more and more, and at the last, the pope and the Antichrist seem to him practically equivalent concepts. Yet there are passages which are moderate in tone: G. V. Lechler identifies three stages in Wycliffe's relations with the papacy. The first step, which carried him to the outbreak of the schism, involves moderate recognition of the papal primacy; the second, which carried him to 1381, is marked by an estrangement from the papacy; and the third shows him in sharp contest.

=== Basic positions in philosophy ===
Wycliffe was a prominent English philosopher of the second half of the 14th century. He earned his great repute as a philosopher at an early date. Henry Knighton says that in philosophy he was second to none, and in scholastic discipline incomparable. There was a period in his life when he devoted himself exclusively to scholastic philosophy. His first book, Latin: De Logica (1360), explores the fundamentals of Scholastic Theology. He believed that "one should study Logic in order to better understand the human mind because ...human thoughts, feelings and actions bear God's image and likeness". He espoused propositional realism: that a true proposition maps onto a truth about being (i.e., about something real.)

The centre of Wycliffe's philosophical system is formed by the doctrine of the prior existence in the thought of God of all things and events. While Platonic realism would view "beauty' as a property that exists in an ideal form independently of any mind or thing, "for Wycliffe every universal, as part of creation, derived its existence from God, the Creator". Wycliffe was a close follower of Augustine, and always upheld the primacy of the Creator over the created reality.

In some of his teachings, as in Latin: De annihilatione, the influence of Thomas Aquinas can be detected. He said that Democritus, Plato, Augustine, and Grosseteste far outranked Aristotle. So far as his relations to the philosophers of the Middle Ages are concerned, he held to realism as opposed to the nominalism advanced by William of Ockham.

A number of Wycliffe's ideas have been carried forward in the twentieth century by philosopher and Reformed theologian Cornelius Van Til.

==== Dominium ====
A second key point of Wycliffe's is his emphasis on the notion of divine Lordship (Latin: dominium).

Latin: De dominio Divino (c. 1373) examines the relationship between God and his creatures. The practical application of this for Wycliffe was seen in the rebellious attitude of individuals (particulars) towards rightful authority (universals).

"Beyond all doubt, intellectual and emotional error about universals is the cause of all sin that reigns in the world."

In Latin: De civili dominio ("On Civil Dominion", c. 1377) he discusses the appropriate circumstance under which an entity may be seen as possessing authority over lesser subjects. Latin: Dominium is always conferred by God: injuries inflicted on someone personally by a king should be born by them submissively, a conventional idea, but injuries by a king against God should be patiently resisted even to death. Gravely sinful kings and popes forfeited their divine right to obedience. Versions of this were taken up by Lollards and Hussites.

=== Attitude toward speculation ===
Wycliffe's fundamental principle of the preexistence in thought of all reality involves the most serious obstacle to freedom of the will; the philosopher could assist himself only by the formula that the free will of man was something predetermined of God. He demanded strict dialectical training as the means of distinguishing the true from the false, and asserted that logic (or the syllogism) furthered the knowledge of catholic verities; ignorance of logic was the reason why men misunderstood Scripture, since men overlooked the connection, the distinction between idea and appearance.

Wycliffe was not merely conscious of the distinction between theology and philosophy, but his sense of reality led him to pass by scholastic questions. He left aside philosophical discussions that seemed to have no significance for the religious consciousness and those that pertained purely to scholasticism: "We concern ourselves with the verities that are, and leave aside the errors which arise from speculation on matters which are not."

=== Sacraments ===
John Wycliffe believed that the communion bread was "very God in form of bread" (i.e., not merely symbolic) but rejected the theological characterisation of this as transubstantiation. He also rejected the sacrament of confession, saying they were against scripture. Wycliffe was attacked as being a Donatist, however the claim was a misconception, perhaps used to discredit his views on the Eucharist, which were consubstantiation:

The nature of the bread is not destroyed by what is done by the priest, it is only elevated so as to become a substance more honoured. The bread while becoming by virtue of Christ’s words the body of Christ does not cease to be bread. When it has become sacramentally the body of Christ, it remains bread substantially.”

— John Wycliffe

=== Soteriology (Controversial) ===
From the early Reformation, Wycliffe has been presented as having similar views on justification as the reformers: that according to Wycliffe faith was sufficient for salvation:

That faith in our Lord Jesus Christ, is sufficient for salvation, and that without faith it is impossible to please God; that the merit of Christ is able, by itself, to redeem all mankind from hell, and that this sufficiency is to be understood without any other cause concurring; (Wycliffe) persuaded men therefore to trust wholly to Christ, to rely altogether upon his sufferings, not to seek to be justified but by his righteousness; and that by participation in his righteousness, all men are righteous.

— popularly attributed to John Wycliffe with revisions, but from précis by Protestant scholar Dr Thomas James, An Apology for John Wycliffe (1608)

Wyliffe's concentration on necessity has further been characterized as an endorsement of so-called Augustinian soteriology, monergism, and double predestination. Martin Luther accepted in his Assertio that Wycliffe taught that "all events occur by absolute necessity," the characterization anathematized at the Council of Constance. Wycliffe is claimed to have anticipated Luther's teaching that "God is the author of even man's evil deeds."

However, other scholars now dispute this characterization: according to the Stanford Encyclopedia of Philosophy he maintained "simultaneously the necessity of all that happens and human freedom (cf. Tractatus de universalibus, ch. 14, pp. 333–47); and many times he affirms that it would be heretical to say that all things happen by absolute necessity..."

Wycliffe taught that free will (the power of judging what is just and following it or not) cannot be extinguished: God cannot oblige what is impossible, such as requiring rectitude but denying the ability to do it. Wycliffe in Tractatus de universabilus ch. 14 gives the example of a child being guided to walk: a completely willing act that completely requires assistance. (Both these arguments were later given by Erasmus in On the Freedom of the Will against Martin Luther.) So Wycliffe's view allows free will and necessity to exist at the same time, not in competition: God necessitates the person to will for the good, however the will can act against this conscience: human volitional power was necessitated by God. One scholar even characterizes Wycliffe, "God giveth to each man free-will to choose good or evil and God is ready to give them grace if they will receive it."

According to a recent Protestant scholar, "Wycliff’s writings are by and large devoid of discussion about or concern for the doctrine of justification."

=== Scripture ===
Wycliffe expressed his theories in the book De Veritate Sacrae Scripturae (On the Truthfulness of Holy Scripture, c.1378).

Wycliffe's dictum was “omnis veritas est ex scriptura, et ut necessarior est expressior” (all truth necessary to faith is in the scripture, and the more necessary, the more expressly. This proposition was later taken up by Martin Luther.

The whole of scripture is one word of God (Tota scriptura sacra est unum dei verbum): being a monologue by the same author meant that sentences from different books could be combined without much regard for context, supporting strained and mystical interpretations.

Wycliffe taught that the scriptures were literally true unless obviously figurative, to the extent that when Jesus spoke in parables, he was reporting events that had actually occurred. Psalm 22 v6 ("I am a worm and no man"), which Pseudo-Dionysius had memorably used to give 'worm' as a name of God, became in Wycliffe's extreme literalism a statement that Jesus had been begotten without sexual contact (as was then believed of worms) and was formally God not a simply man.

The literal sense of scripture is that sense which the Holy Ghost first imparted so that the faithful soul might ascend to God (Latin: sensum literalem scripture sensum, quem spiritus sanctus primo indidit, ut animus fidelis ascendat in deum.) Wycliffe wrote of progressive stages of scriptural interpretation: the plain or literal reading of text and its interpretation being the most basic, leading to a mystical understanding of the sense of the author, leading finally to seeing the Book of Life which contains every truth. However, historians have suggested that this mystical view allowed Wycliffe to work backwards, back-fitting his reading of scripture to suit his theological views. Indeed, Wycliffe maintains that the Christian faith would persist even if all biblical codices were “burnt up or otherwise destroyed”.

==== Vernacular Scripture ====
Wycliffe is popularly connected with the view that scriptures should be translated into the vernacular and made available to laymen, and that this was a critical issue in the censures against him.

However, scholars have noted the availability of scriptures to laypeople in the vernacular was not a notable theme of Wycliffe's theological works. (It is mentioned in his De XXXIII erroribus curitatum, Chapter 26 against those who would stop secular men from "intermeddling with the Gospel".) Nor were there any church-wide bans on vernacular scriptures in place that Wycliffe might be regarded as protesting against. It was not part of Wycliffe's 1377 papal censure, nor the declaration of heresy by the Council of Constance (1415). Vernacular scriptures were not mentioned in the two key early Lollard documents, regarded as channelling his doctrine: the Twelve Conclusions (c. 1396) and the Thirty Seven Conclusions (c. 1396) (or Remonstrances).

== Legacy ==
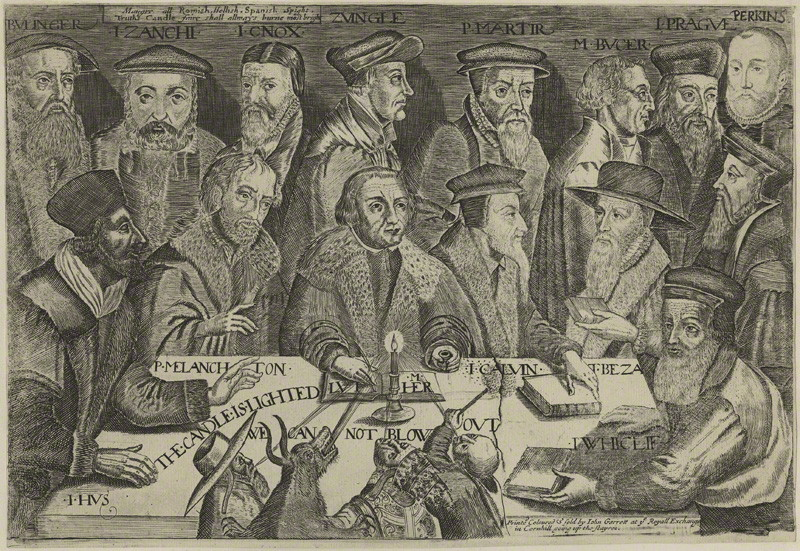
Image of Wycliffe among the leading Protestant Reformers such as Jan Hus, Martin Luther, and John Calvin.

Wycliffe has been regarded as instrumental in the development of a translation of the Bible in English, a precedent of making it accessible to English speakers with poor Latin, though whether he himself translated the Bible, in part or whole, or merely played a part in motivating its translation indirectly through his revival of Oxford biblical studies, is a matter of debate.

In the sixteenth century, in Spanish foreign policy debates between influential Dominican scholars associated with the University of Salamanca, the claim that Native Americans were lesser beings who could be invaded and violently subjugated, and who did not attract Christ's commands to love, was rejected and characterized as a version of Wycliff's teaching that sin destroyed the image of God.

His theology also had a strong influence on Jan Hus. Hus' De Ecclesia summarised Wycliffe's work of the same name, with additional material from Wycliffe's De potentate papae. See also Writings of Hus and Wycliffe.

Several institutions are named after him:

- Wycliffe Global Alliance, an alliance of organisations with the common objective of translating the Bible for every language group that needs it.
- Wycliffe Hall, Oxford, one of the Church of England's designated Evangelical theological colleges.
- Wycliffe College, Toronto, a graduate theological school federated with the University of Toronto.
- Wycliffe College, Gloucestershire, an English independent, private day and boarding school.

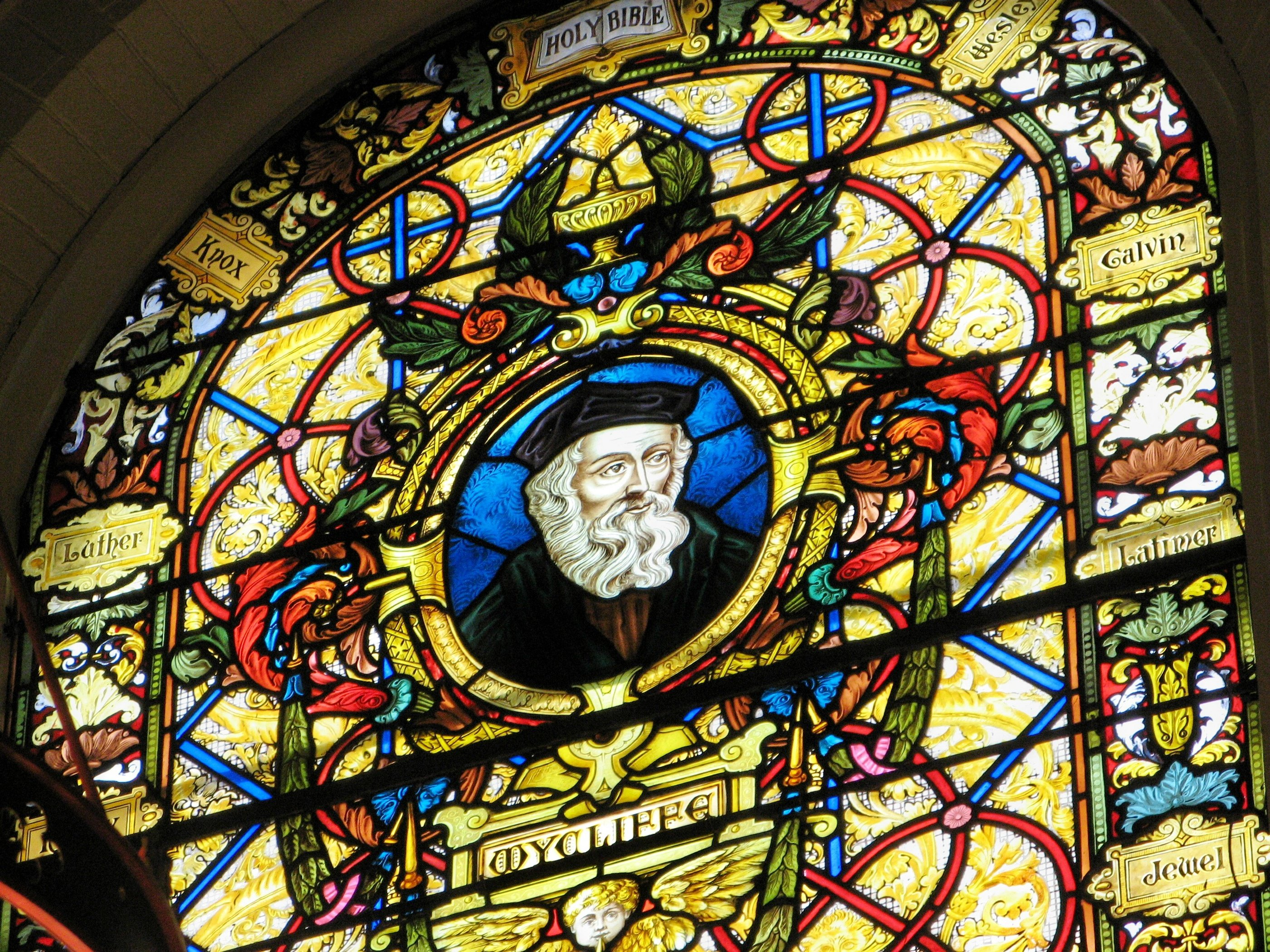
A stained glass window in Wycliffe College Chapel, Toronto

Wycliffe is honoured with a commemoration in the Church of England on 31 December, and in the Anglican Church of Canada.

Wycliffe and its variants are popular given names, presumably starting in some Protestant communities.

In the centre of Lutterworth, a Grade II-listed memorial obelisk to Wycliffe was erected in June 1897 on a site behind which the Wycliffe Memorial Methodist Church was built a few years later for the town's Wesleyan Methodist congregation.

== See also ==
- John Bankin
- Ecclesiae Regimen
- Lollardy
- William Tyndale

== Notes and references ==
=== General and cited sources ===
- Barrett, Matthew (2013). Salvation by Grace: The Case for Effectual Calling and Regeneration. Phillipsburg: P & R Publishing.
- Castor, Helen (2024). The Eagle and the Hart: The Tragedy of Richard II and Henry IV.
- Conti, Alessandro (6 May 2025). "John Wyclif". Stanford Encyclopedia of Philosophy.
- Edgar, Robert (2008). Civilizations Past & Present. Vol. 1: To 1650 (12th ed.). Pearson Education. pp. 434–435. ISBN 978-0205573752.
- Ellingsen, Mark (2012). Reclaiming Our Roots, Volume I: An Inclusive Introduction to Church History: The Late First Century to the Eve of the Reformation. Eugene, OR: Wipf and Stock Publishers.
- Hudson, Anne; Kenny, Anthony (2004). "Wyclif, John (d. 1384)". Oxford Dictionary of National Biography (online ed.). Oxford University Press. doi:10.1093/ref:odnb/30122. (Subscription, Wikipedia Library access or UK public library membership required.)
- James, Frank A. (1998). Peter Martyr Vermigli and Predestination: The Augustinian Inheritance of an Italian Reformer. Oxford: Clarendon.
- Lahey, Stephen Edmund (2009). John Wyclif (Great Medieval Thinkers). New York: Oxford University Press. ISBN 978-0199720286 – via Google Books.
- Lechler, Gotthard Victor (1904). John Wycliffe and His English Precursors. Religious Tract Society. ISBN 9780404162351.
- Stacey, John (2024). "John Wycliffe". Encyclopædia Britannica.
- Sammons, Peter (2020). Reprobation: from Augustine to the Synod of Dort: The Historical Development of the Reformed Doctrine of Reprobation. Gottingen: Vandenhoeck & Ruprecht.
