= Simon Kay =

British plastic surgeon

Professor Simon Peter Jabir Kay OBE is a British consultant plastic surgeon, born in Kuwait and educated in Guernsey, Channel Islands, and then at Shrewsbury School. Kay qualified in medicine at the University of Oxford in 1976, and trained in plastic surgery in the UK in Wexham, Birmingham, and Manchester, with secondments for specialist training in Adelaide, Australia and Louisville, Kentucky, United States. In 2024 he announced his candidacy in the 2024 University of Oxford Chancellor election, described by The Times as an outside bet for the role.

== Career ==
Kay's decision to become a surgeon, particularly a reconstructive surgeon, came about due to his own childhood having badly burnt his finger on a small electric fire when he was five. He had to endure many operations, which he states were unnecessary and led him to want to become a surgeon, but also someone who would always ask "what is in the best interests of the patient?"

He specialised in Children's Hand Surgery as Consultant Plastic Surgeon in at Leeds Teaching Hospitals NHS Trust from 1987, later becoming Professor of Hand Surgery at the University of Leeds. There Kay developed nationally renowned services for children's hand surgery and for major nerve injury, and led the appreciation of the role psychology should play in children's surgery, arguing that the consequences of childhood trauma extend far beyond the child itself. Kay carried out the UK's first hand transplant operation in 2013 and went on to develop a national centrally funded service for Hand Transplantation in the UK. Among many innovations in this development Kay identified the psychological vulnerability of transplant recipients, and showed that a state-funded service would thrive in contrast to many services where funding is haphazard and ad hoc.

In his academic career Kay has authored many peer-reviewed papers, and was one of three editors of an award-winning textbook of children's hand surgery, later being editor in chief of the Oxford Textbook of Plastic and Reconstructive Surgery. In 2002 he took over as Editor in Chief of the British Journal of Plastic Surgery, and soon rebranded and reformed it to become Journal of Plastic, Reconstructive & Aesthetic Surgery (JPRAS) which is now a leading international journal for the specialty with an impact factor of 2.7.

He has been President of two surgical specialty organisations, the British Society for Surgery of the Hand, and the British Association of Aesthetic Plastic Surgeons. He has served on the Board of the Thackray Museum of Medicine (Leeds) and on an advisory committee of the Royal Armouries Museum reflecting his broad interest in history in general.

== Awards ==
Kay has lectured by invitation as a keynote speaker in many European countries, the US, Australia, Japan and South Africa. He was awarded a DSc from the University of Bradford (2015), and an honorary fellowship ad hominem of the Royal College of Surgeons of Edinburgh (2001), (already being a Fellow of the Royal College of Surgeons of England since 1981).

He was appointed an Officer of the Order of the British Empire (OBE) in the 2019 New Year Honours for services to Complex Reconstructive Hand Surgery.

In November 2001, The Times named Kay as one of the top doctors employed in Britain at that time. In 2013 he was declared the Health Service Journal's "Clinical Leader of the Year".
