= Myfreeimplants =

Cosmetic surgery financing website

MyFreeImplants
- Company type: Privately held company
- Founded: 2006; 20 years ago
- Founder: Jay Moore; Jason Grunstra
- Website: www.myfreeimplants.com

MyFreeImplants is a website used by women to find donations, particularly from men, via crowdfunding for breast augmentation.

The women frequently converse with their donors.

== Criticism ==
The site has been criticized by professional organizations, including the British Association of Aesthetic Plastic Surgeons (BAAPS) for tasteless marketing and trivializing a significant surgical procedure.

It has also been criticized for providing a platform for men to ask for sexual favors.
