= 2024 University of Oxford Chancellor election =

- 28 October – 27 November 2024
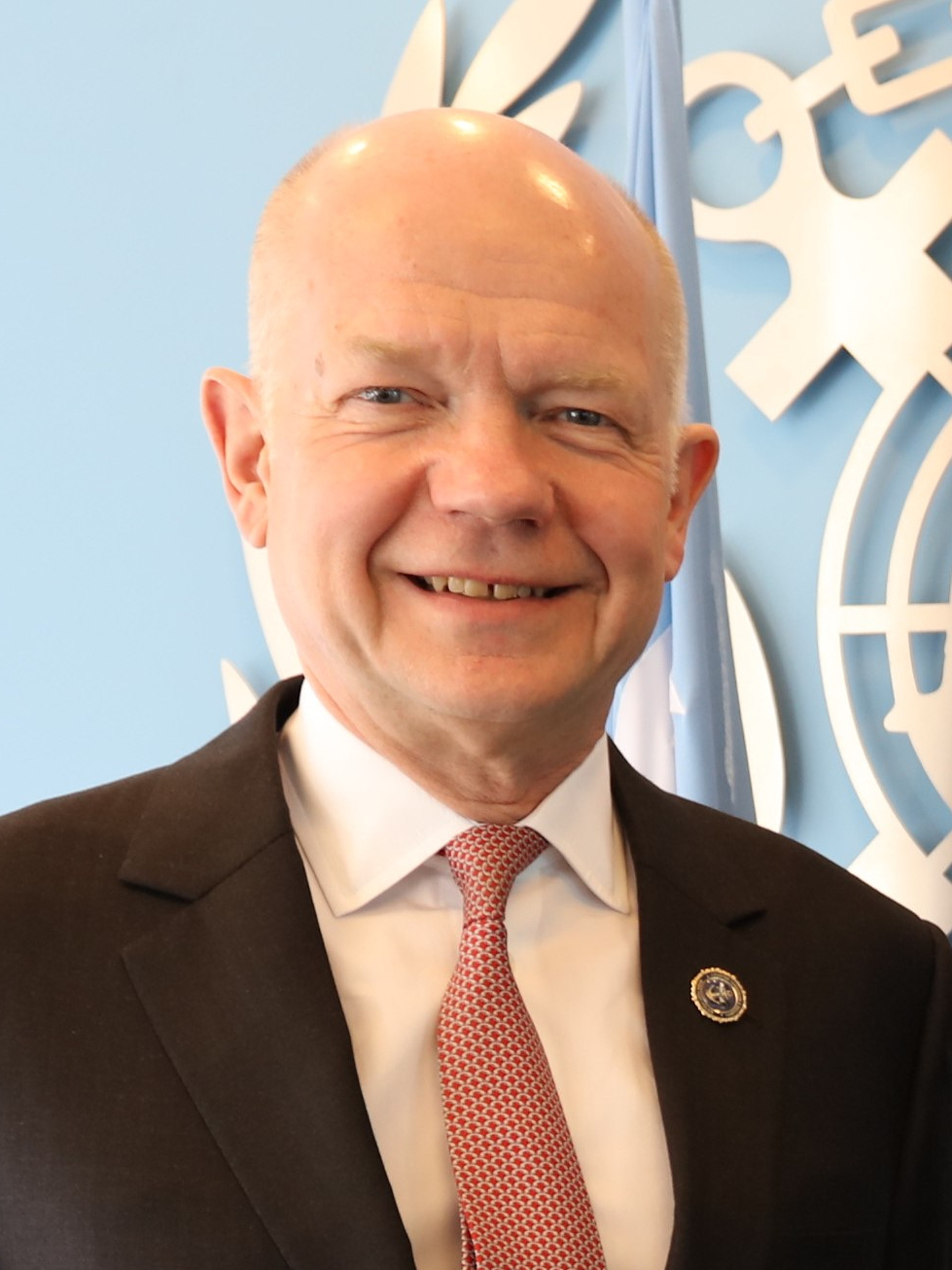

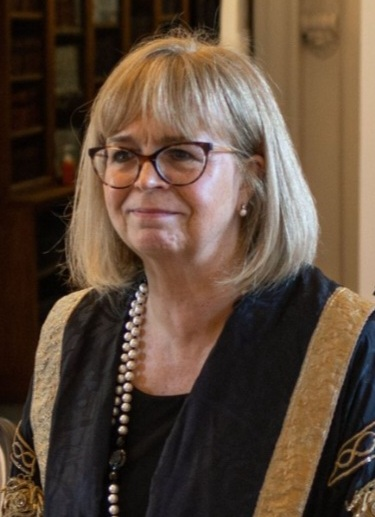

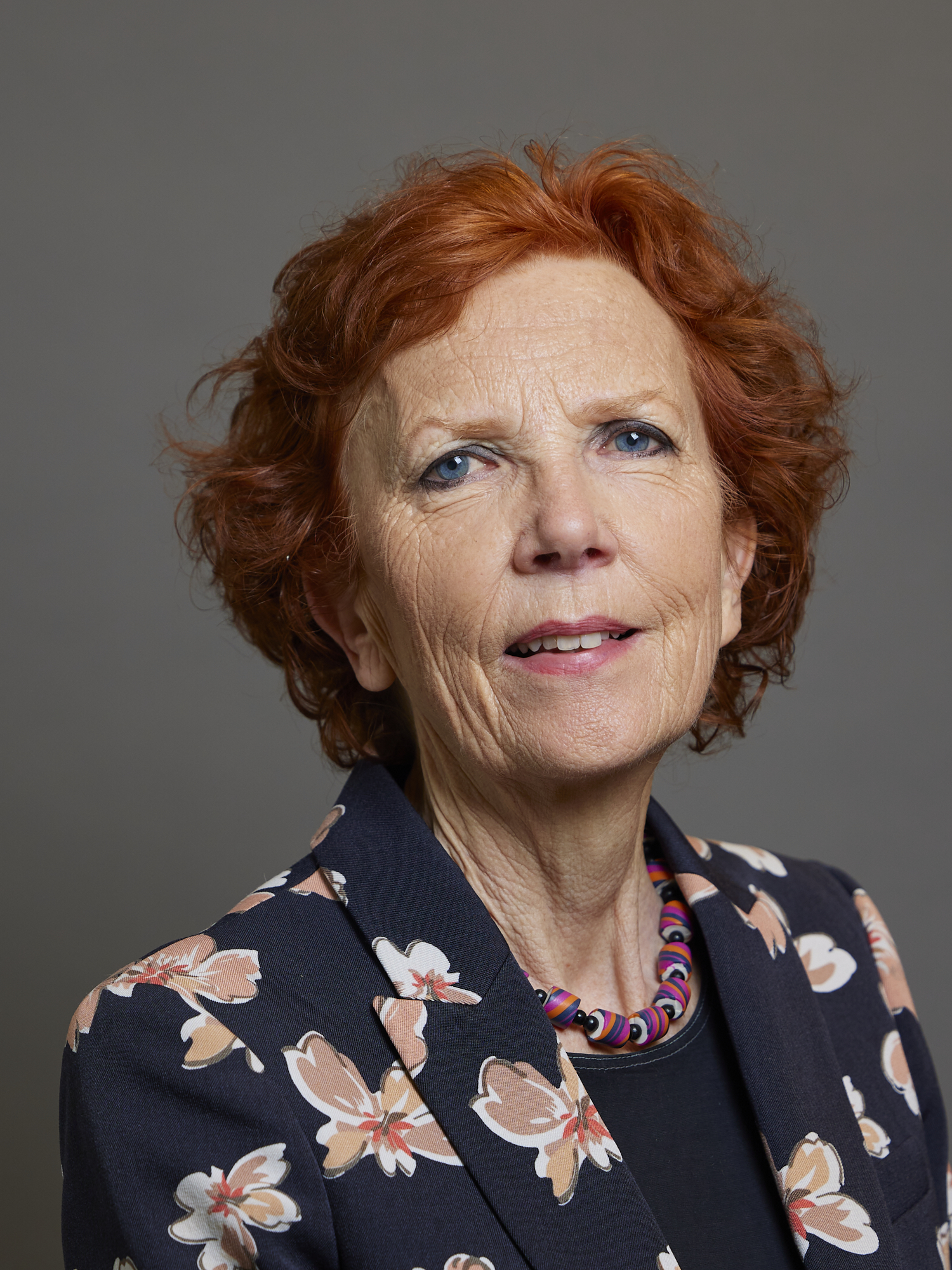

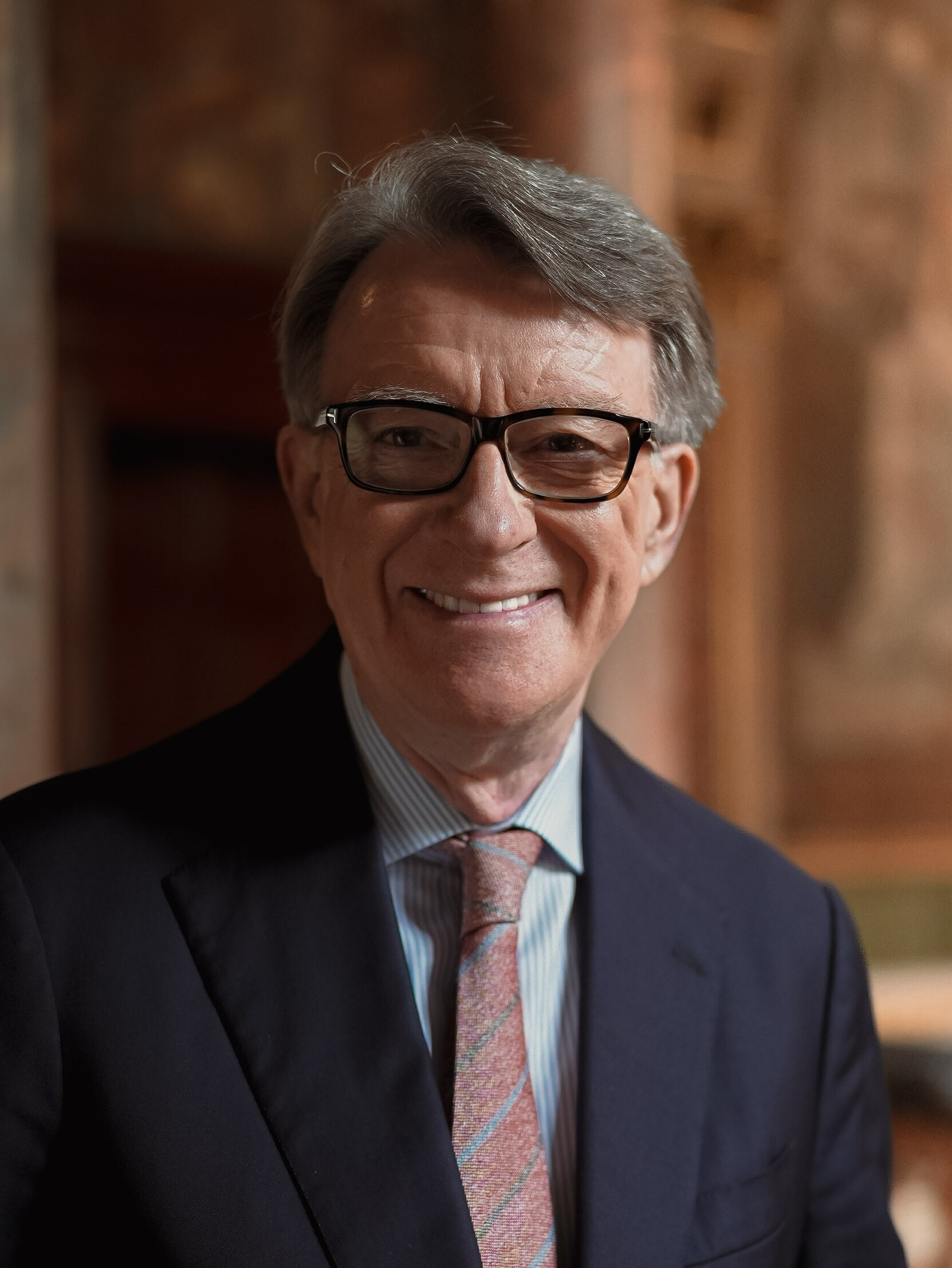
Candidate	The Lord Hague of Richmond	Lady Elish Angiolini
Party	Conservative	Independent
Final stage	12,609 (53.4%)	11,006 (46.6%)
Third stage	11,766 (48.7%)	7,727 (31.9%)
Second stage	10,472 (42.4%)	6,915 (28.0%)
First stage	9,589 (38.5%)	6,296 (25.3%)
Candidate	The Baroness Royall of Blaisdon	The Lord Mandelson
Party	Labour Co-op	Labour
Final stage	Eliminated	Eliminated
Third stage	4,662 (19.3%)	Eliminated
Second stage	3,945 (15.9%)	3,344 (13.5%)
First stage	3,599 (14.4%)	2,940 (11.8%)
Chancellor before election
The Lord Patten of Barnes
Elected Chancellor
The Lord Hague of Richmond

The 2024 University of Oxford election for the position of Chancellor became necessary upon the resignation of the incumbent Chancellor, Chris Patten. Applications for the role closed on 4 September 2024 and the list of accepted candidates was announced on 16 October. More than 23,000 electors cast their votes in the first round, which took place during Third Week of Michaelmas term (week commencing 28 October 2024). This vote produced a shortlist of five candidates for the second and final round, to take place during Sixth Week of Michaelmas Term (week commencing 18 November 2024). On 27 November, William Hague was announced as the winner of the election.

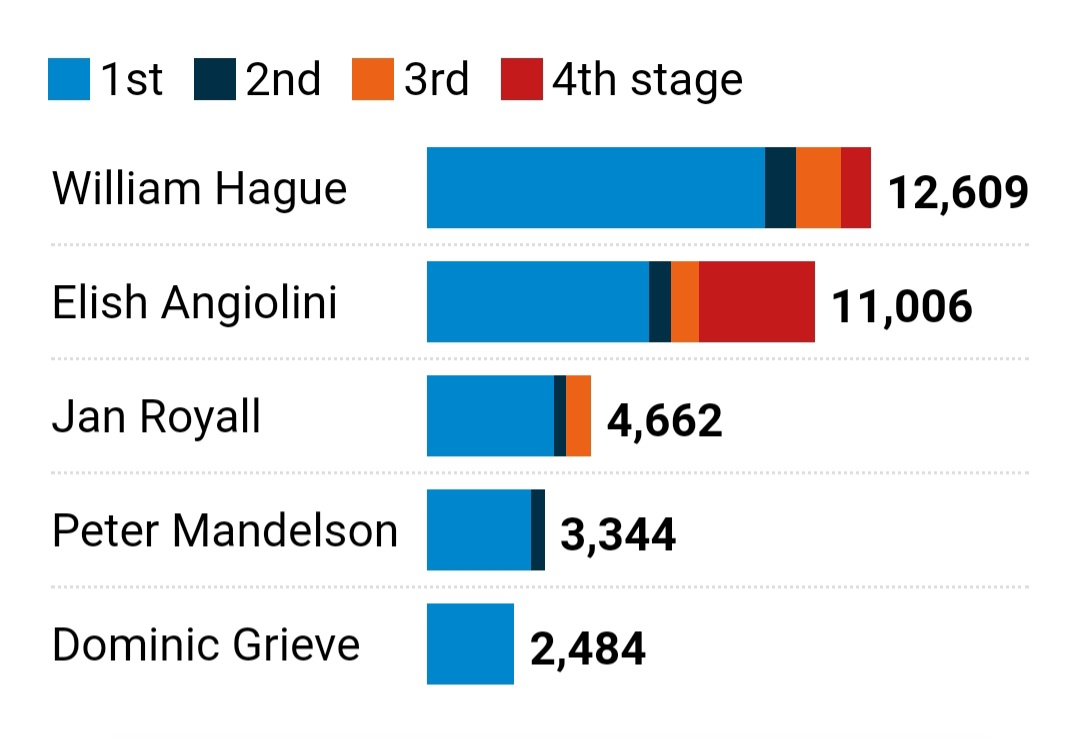
Results of the fourth round of the election

== Vacancy ==
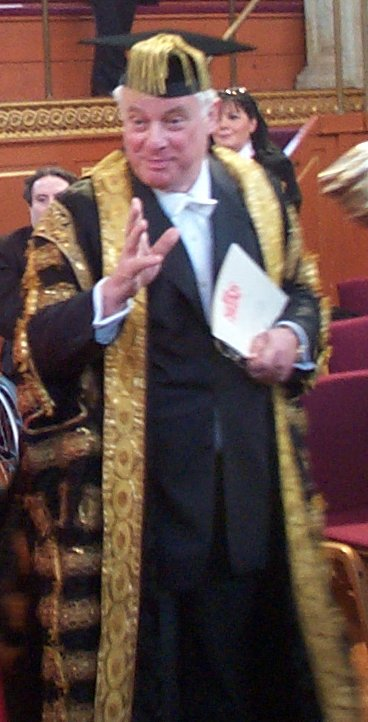
Patten in academic dress

Baron Patten of Barnes had been elected as Chancellor of the University of Oxford in March 2003. In February 2024, he announced in a letter to the Vice-Chancellor of the university, Irene Tracey, that he would retire as Chancellor at the end of the academic year, after twenty-one years in post. He pointed out that he was coming up to his 80th birthday.

In resigning, Patten quoted from the University of Oxford's statutes of 2002: "the Chancellor shall be elected by Convocation and shall hold office during his or her life or until his or her resignation."

== Early speculation about candidates ==
On 7 February 2024, The Daily Telegraph reported that the bookmaker William Hill had opened a book on the outcome of the election and the former Conservative minister Rory Stewart, of Balliol College, had emerged as front runner. Chris Patten and his two predecessors, Harold Macmillan, Earl of Stockton, and Roy Jenkins, Lord Jenkins of Hillhead, were also Balliol men.

Other potential candidates were reported at the same time as the former British prime ministers Theresa May, Sir Tony Blair, and Boris Johnson and the former prime minister of Pakistan Imran Khan. All of these were members of the University of Oxford, although this qualification was not strictly required, and in principle anyone could be nominated. The Daily Telegraph subsequently reported that Tony Blair's spokesman said "he was not in the running for the job."

Stewart announced on social media in June that he would not be standing, saying "There’s been talk of me as a candidate for Oxford Chancellor. There are much better candidates than me for Oxford. I won’t be standing. Good luck to those who are."

== Process ==
For the election of 2024, the University discarded the previous requirement for candidates to be nominated by at least fifty members of the university's Convocation. Instead, candidates could simply nominate themselves.

The University's Registrar, in a note to Congregation, reported that the Council envisaged that the Chancellor would have the following three qualities:

1. outstanding achievements in their field and the ability to command respect beyond it;
2. a deep appreciation for the University's research and academic mission, its global community, and its ambition to remain a world class research and teaching university;
3. the ability and willingness to enhance the reputation of the University locally, nationally and abroad.

The election of 2024 was the first to take place on the internet. At all previous elections, ballots needed to be cast in person in Oxford. Those eligible to vote in the election were the more than 250,000 members of Convocation; i.e. graduates of the university who have had their degree conferred, and current and retired staff members of the Congregation.

The first round of online voting took place during Third Week of Michaelmas term (week commencing 28 October 2024). As there were more than ten candidates, a modified alternative vote system was used with two rounds of voting. In the first round, voters could rank as many of the candidates as they chose, and lower-ranking candidates were successively eliminated, with votes transferred to remaining candidates, until only five candidates remained. These five candidates went forward to a second round, to take place during Sixth Week of Michaelmas Term (week commencing 18 November 2024), again using the alternative vote system, with candidates to be successively eliminated until one candidate achieves 50% of the vote. The new Chancellor was to be announced during Seventh Week.

== Creation of Chancellor's Election Committee ==
On 22 March 2024, the University announced changes to its regulations governing the election of a new Chancellor, which were to take effect on 5 April 2024. Instead of any candidate being entitled to stand, subject to being nominated by fifty electors, a new Chancellor's Election Committee would remove nominated candidates from the election process whom it did not consider "suitable".

The Committee would decide the criteria for suitability and may disclose what they were. It would "have due regard to the principles of equality and diversity".

If the Committee found only one candidate suitable, it could declare that person to be elected unopposed or could choose to re-open the nominations.

If in a contested election the voting was tied, the Chairman of the Committee would decide between the candidates with an equal number of votes.

The members of the Committee were:

- the High Steward, Lord Reed of Allermuir, who was designated to chair the Committee ex officio;
- the Vice-Chancellor,

and other "representatives from across the collegiate University and its council". These were listed as:

- one person appointed by the University Council from among its external members;
- two members of the Council appointed by it from among its members;
- one member of Congregation appointed by the Gardens, Libraries and Museums, University administrative Services, and the Department for continuing Education;
- one member of Congregation appointed by each of the divisional boards;
- the early career research staff representative who attends the Council;
- and the chair of the conference of colleges.

The Committee was given the power to co-opt one or two other members.

Neil O'Brien MP, an Oxford graduate and member of Christ Church, commented the same day: "A stitch-up in Oxford: with no public discussion the University has decided to move away from democracy when choosing its next Chancellor." An article in The Daily Telegraph the next day quoted his "stitch-up" comment and also an unnamed college don who had told the newspaper he saw the new Committee as an "undemocratic, Politburo-style election approach”. Dr Yuan Zi Zhou, a university lecturer in politics, commented that the changing of the rules "illustrates the control freak tendencies of modern academic managers". The removal of duly nominated candidates was believed to be unprecedented in such elections in the United Kingdom.

On 25 March, the Evening Standard quoted an anonymous "senior cabinet minister" as saying: "We can’t have a stitch-up. The next chancellor must be selected by the same democratic process as the last one." It reported that "another senior government source", also anonymous, had commented: "It is all about this performative obsession with equality and diversity." In a statement the University said:

"The next chancellor will be elected by convocation — the body of university members and alumni — using an online platform. Eligibility will first be checked by the chancellor's election committee against criteria agreed by council. The committee will be made up of representatives from across the collegiate university and its council."

On 28 March, a letter from Vice-chancellor Irene Tracey appeared in The Times defending the changes and claiming "democracy is alive and well at Oxford".

On 30 March, The Sunday Telegraph claimed to have seen a leaked email showing that the intended purpose of the Committee was "to stop politicians becoming chancellor". Damian Green, the former de facto deputy prime minister and a friend of Theresa May from their days at the University of Oxford, described the criteria as "a momentous and ill-advised change which at the very least should have been consulted on".

On 15 May, The Times reported that "Oxford University has dropped plans to vet the candidates to become its new chancellor after being accused by ministers of an attempted "stitch up" to prevent another white male politician from getting the job...The change is designed to see off a row with senior government ministers, who attacked the proposals as "wokeism gone mad" and said they were designed to install university officials' preferred candidate." In the same paper, the leader article welcomed the U-turn as "a victory for fairness and common sense."

== New limit to term of office ==
In the Middle Ages, Oxford chancellors were elected for a term of one to three years. Later, they were elected for life, beginning with John Russell in 1483. A further function given to the new Chancellor's Election Committee in 2024 was to make a recommendation to the University Council to fix a term of office for the Chancellor. This would need to be decided upon by the Council.

The purpose of the change was stated as "to prevent the coincidence of a newly appointed Vice-Chancellor and a new elected Chancellor".

The term of office decided upon later in 2024 was ten years.

== Candidates enter the race ==
On 10 August 2024, it was reported that Lady Elish Angiolini was running, noting that if successful she would be the first woman Chancellor since the post was created in 1224.

On 16 August 2024, The Daily Telegraph reported that former Foreign Secretary William Hague, Baron Hague of Richmond had applied for the role of Chancellor.

It was reported by The Observer on 17 August that former government minister Peter Mandelson was rumoured to have applied for the role. This was confirmed by Cherwell on 21 August.

On 26 August, The Times reported that Margaret Casely-Hayford, a former Chancellor of the University of Coventry, was seeking to become Oxford's first female Chancellor, but was an "outside bet"; and that Professor Simon Kay, a plastic surgeon at who had performed the United Kingdom's first hand transplant, was another candidate.

On 28 August, The Times reported that Imran Khan, the former Pakistani leader who was then in jail, and Dominic Grieve, the former Attorney General for England and Wales, had both entered the race.

On 29 August, Governor of Edinburgh Castle, Fitzalan Pursuivant Extraordinary and journalist Major General Alastair Bruce of Crionaich announced on X that he had submitted an application.

On 3 September, Jan Royall announced her candidacy to be the next chancellor via social media.

On 8 September, The Oxford Student reported that David Willetts, Baron Willetts, a former Conservative minister for Universities and Higher Education and Visiting Professor at King's College, London, had announced his bid.

== List of candidates announced by the University ==
The list of candidates who had been accepted was announced on 16 October 2024.

=== Leading contenders ===
The table of leading contenders is as guided by the mainstream printed media, listed by age.

Image	Name	Oxford college	Current and former roles	Political affiliation	Previous Chancellorships
	William Hague, Baron Hague of Richmond	Magdalen	Former Foreign Secretary and Leader of the House of Commons	Conservative	
	Lady Elish Angiolini	St Hugh's	Principal of St Hugh's College; Former Lord Advocate of Scotland		University of West of Scotland; Pro-Vice-Chancellor, Oxford
	Dominic Grieve	Magdalen	Former Attorney General for England and Wales	Independent, former Conservative	
	David Willetts, Baron Willetts	Christ Church	Former Minister for Universities and Science	Conservative	University of Leicester
	Jan Royall, Baroness Royall of Blaisdon	Somerville	Principal, Somerville College; Former Leader of the House of Lords	Labour Co-operative	
	Margaret Casely-Hayford	Somerville	Lawyer, businesswoman and public figure		University of Coventry
	Peter Mandelson, Baron Mandelson	St Catherine's	Former Business Secretary and EU Commissioner	Labour	Manchester Metropolitan University

=== Other candidates ===
Name	Oxford college(s)	Current role	Location
Sidra Aftab		Lawyer	Lahore
Hasanat Ahmad		Doctoral student	Lahore
Ayham Ammora	Christ Church	CEO and Board Director	Qatar
Anwar Baig		Lawyer	
Ankur Shiv Bhandari		Mayor of Bracknell Forest in 2022–23	Berkshire
Nirpal Singh Paul Bhangal		Professor of International Entrepreneurship	Camden
Kashif Bilal			
Alastair Bruce		Governor of Edinburgh Castle	Scotland
George Callaghan	University	Tour Guide	Oxford
Graham Catlin	Exeter	Teacher	France
Mei Rose Connor		Doctoral student	Wisconsin
Emma Dandy	Balliol	Postgraduate student	Oxford
Azeem Farooqi		Doctor	Oxford
Matthew Firth	Wycliffe Hall	Anglican clergyman	
Lyn Michelle Heiming	Wadham	Physicist	Germany
Benjamin Ivatts			Oldham
Simon Kay	Christ Church	Professor of hand surgery	Leeds
Ryn Miake-Lye		Biochemist and community health volunteer	New York
Angie Moxham	St John's	Public Relations entrepreneur	
Aftab Shaikh		Legal advocate	Lahore
Maxim Parr-Reid	Trinity	Tutoring	London
Alam Pasha		Fruit drink processing	Bangalore
Kadira Pethiyagoda	New College; St Antony's	Foreign Affairs adviser	
Kashmaila Rauf		Amazon team leader	Salford
Talha Shah			
Abrar ul Hassan Shapoo			
Harry Stratton	Magdalen	Lawyer	London
Tanya Tajik		Business woman and Zumba teacher	
Pratik Tarvadi		Forensic medicine	
Francisc Vladovici Poplauschi			
Xingang Wang	Christ Church	Transport engineer, banking	

== Candidates rejected ==
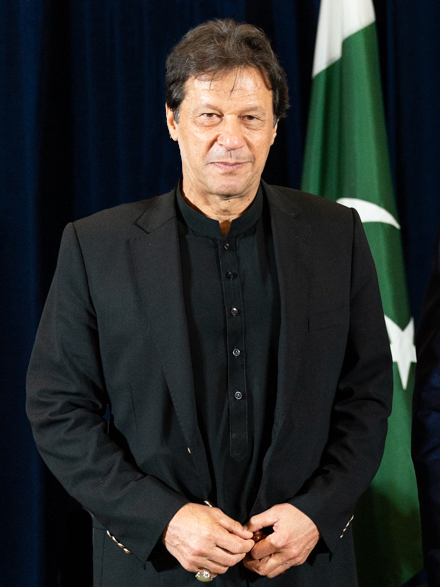
Imran Khan

On 18 August 2024, it was reported that the former Prime Minister of Pakistan Imran Khan had submitted his nomination papers for the role. His adviser announced on 16 October that the application had been rejected. The university declined to state its reasons, but commented that a candidate must be a "fit and proper person" as determined by HM Revenue and Customs guidance.

== Results ==
=== First round ===
Candidate	%	Count																																				
Candidate	%	1	2	3	4	5	6	7	8	9	10	11	12	13	14	15	16	17	18	19	20	21	22	23	24	25	26	27	28	29	30	31	32	33	34	35	36	37
William Hague	34.56%	7952	7952	7952	7952	7953	7953	7953	7953	7954	7954	7955	7955	7955	7957	7961	7965	7966	7967	7969	7969	7974	7981	7991	7992	8005	8012	8027	8068	8084	8165	8336	8354	8453	9015	9985	10524	12424
Elish Angiolini	16.75%	3854	3854	3854	3854	3854	3854	3854	3854	3855	3855	3856	3856	3856	3857	3858	3858	3859	3861	3862	3863	3863	3865	3870	3879	3887	3894	3920	3948	3983	4026	4044	4144	4524	4674	5121	6499	7355
Peter Mandelson	11.05%	2543	2543	2543	2543	2543	2543	2543	2543	2543	2543	2543	2544	2544	2545	2545	2545	2545	2548	2550	2551	2554	2557	2563	2571	2573	2579	2590	2610	2623	2658	2670	2709	2823	3038	3605	4158	
Dominic Grieve	9.31%	2141	2141	2141	2141	2142	2142	2142	2142	2142	2142	2142	2142	2142	2142	2142	2142	2143	2143	2143	2144	2148	2151	2151	2152	2156	2159	2165	2192	2208	2243	2266	2295	2389	2701			
Jan Royall	9.23%	2124	2124	2124	2124	2124	2124	2124	2124	2125	2125	2126	2127	2127	2127	2128	2128	2131	2131	2132	2135	2138	2139	2140	2144	2144	2154	2177	2196	2239	2268	2284	2369	2676	2819	3099		
David Willetts	5.88%	1354	1354	1354	1354	1354	1354	1356	1356	1356	1356	1356	1356	1356	1356	1356	1356	1356	1358	1358	1359	1360	1362	1362	1363	1364	1367	1373	1384	1394	1420	1469	1483	1546				
Margaret Casely-Hayford	4.41%	1015	1015	1015	1015	1015	1015	1015	1015	1015	1015	1015	1015	1015	1017	1017	1017	1018	1021	1022	1025	1026	1027	1031	1038	1038	1048	1076	1104	1146	1171	1179	1250					
Harry Stratton	1.62%	372	372	372	372	372	372	372	372	372	372	372	372	373	373	373	376	378	380	383	384	386	388	389	399	405	411	418	421	447	458	463						
Matthew Firth	1.38%	318	318	318	318	318	319	319	319	319	319	319	319	320	320	320	321	321	321	322	323	326	326	327	327	342	351	354	362	365	380							
Alastair Bruce of Crionaich	1.28%	295	295	295	295	295	295	295	295	295	295	295	295	295	295	295	295	295	295	296	296	299	299	301	302	305	305	312	326	333								
Simon Kay	0.91%	209	209	209	209	209	209	209	209	209	209	209	210	210	210	210	210	210	211	211	212	214	214	216	218	223	229	237										
Emma Dandy	0.87%	200	200	200	200	200	200	200	200	200	200	201	201	201	201	201	202	203	204	205	206	209	212	213	222	224	237	251	259									
Angie Moxham	0.68%	156	156	156	156	156	156	156	156	156	156	156	156	156	156	156	157	157	157	157	157	158	159	159	163	167	171											
Lyn Michelle Heiming	0.37%	85	85	85	85	86	86	86	86	86	86	86	86	87	87	87	88	88	88	88	90	91	92	93	97	97												
Catlin Graham	0.29%	67	67	67	67	67	67	67	68	68	68	68	69	69	69	70	71	71	71	71	71	73	73	73	73													
Kadiya Pethiragoda	0.27%	63	63	63	63	63	63	63	63	63	63	63	63	64	64	64	64	65	65	66	66	66	68	71														
Xingang Wang	0.21%	49	49	49	49	49	49	49	49	49	49	49	49	49	49	49	49	51	52	52	53	53	53															
Maxim Parr-Reid	0.15%	34	34	34	34	34	34	34	34	34	34	34	35	35	35	35	35	35	35	36	37	37																
George Callaghan	0.14%	32	32	32	32	32	33	33	33	33	33	33	33	33	33	33	34	35	35	36	37																	
Mei Rose Connor	0.10%	22	22	22	22	22	22	22	22	22	23	23	23	23	23	23	25	25	26	26																		
Francisc Vladovici Poplauschi	0.08%	19	19	19	19	19	19	19	19	19	19	19	19	20	21	21	21	21	22																			
Ayham Ammora	0.07%	16	16	16	17	17	17	17	19	19	19	19	19	20	20	20	20	20																				
Benjamin Ivatts	0.06%	14	14	14	14	14	14	14	14	14	14	14	14	15	15	15																						
Azeem Farooqi	0.05%	12	12	12	12	12	12	12	12	12	13	13	13	13	14	16	16																					
Ankur Shiv Bhandari	0.04%	9	9	9	9	9	9	9	9	9	11	11	12	12	13																							
Nirpal Singh Paul Bhangal	0.04%	9	9	9	9	9	9	9	10	10	10	10	10	10																								
Tanya Tajik	0.03%	7	7	7	7	7	7	7	7	7	7	8	8																									
Pratik Tarvadi	0.03%	6	6	6	6	6	6	6	6	7	7	7																										
Sidra Aftab	0.02%	5	5	5	5	5	5	5	6	6	6																											
Talha Shah	0.02%	5	5	5	5	5	5	5	5	5																												
Ryn Miake-Lye	0.02%	5	5	5	5	5	5	5	5																													
Hasanat Ahmad	0.01%	3	3	4	4	4	5	5																														
Alam Pasha	0.01%	3	3	3	3	3	3																															
Abrar Ul Hassan Shapoo	0.01%	3	3	3	3	3																																
Kashmaila Rauf	0.01%	3	3	3	3																																	
Shaikh Aftab Ahmad Javaid Muhammad Hafiz Shaikh	0.01%	2	2	2																																		
Kashif Bilal	0.004%	1	1																																			
Anwar Biag	0.004%	1																																				

=== Second round ===
On 5 November, the University announced five candidates would proceed to the second and final round of voting. They were as follows:

- Elish Angiolini
- Dominic Grieve
- William Hague
- Peter Mandelson
- Jan Royall

The University emailed the 33 eliminated candidates stating "We will not be releasing any information or rankings or vote share on the first round at this point, so as not to influence the second round of the election." Matthew Firth, one of the eliminated candidates, derided the decision on Twitter as an "unacceptable lack of transparency" and "unacceptable and irregular". Civica Election Services were organising the election, and the University instructed Civica not to provide it with more detail than the first five ranked candidates, so as to forestall queries over the full result. Second round voting commenced on 18 November.

Candidate	First stage		Second stage			Third stage			Final stage		
Candidate	Votes	%	Votes	±	%	Votes	±	%	Votes	±	%
William Hague	9,589	38.5	10,472	▲883	42.4	11,766	▲1,294	48.7	12,609	▲843	53.4
Elish Angiolini	6,296	25.3	6,915	▲619	28.0	7,727	▲812	32.0	11,006	▲3,279	46.6
Jan Royall	3,599	14.4	3,945	▲346	16.0	4,662	▲717	19.3	Eliminated		
Peter Mandelson	2,940	11.8	3,344	▲404	13.6	Eliminated					
Dominic Grieve	2,484	10.0	Eliminated								
Votes cast	24,908	100	24,676	▼232	99.1	24,155	▼653	97.0	23,615	▼540	94.8
First Stage votes cast	24,908	100	24,908	0	100	24,908	0	100	24,908	0	100

== See also ==
- List of chancellors of the University of Oxford
- 2003 University of Oxford Chancellor election
- 1987 University of Oxford Chancellor election
- 2025 University of Cambridge Chancellor election
- 2026 University of St Andrews Chancellor election
