= David Carrick (serial rapist) =

English criminal police officer (born 1975)

- Born: 4 January 1975 (age 51); Salisbury, Wiltshire, England
- Occupation: Police officer (Parliamentary and Diplomatic Protection)
- Employer: Metropolitan Police
- Known for: Serial sexual offender
- Call sign: 2752SO
- Status: Imprisoned
- Criminal charges: Attempted assault by penetration; Causing a person to engage in sexual activity without consent; Indecent assault (2 counts); Attempted rape (2 counts); False imprisonment (3 counts); Coercive and controlling behaviour (4 counts); Assault by penetration (5 counts); Indecent assault against a girl under 16 (5 counts); Sexual assault (10 counts); Rape (26 counts)
- Penalty: 37 life sentences with a minimum term of 30 years plus 239 days

Details
- Victims: 14
- Span of crimes: 1989–2020
- Date apprehended: 2 October 2021
- Imprisoned at: HM Prison Full Sutton

David Carrick (born 4 January 1975) is an English serial rapist and former police officer in the Metropolitan Police. He joined the police force in 2001 and worked as an armed officer in the Parliamentary and Diplomatic Protection (PaDP) branch from 2009 until his suspension and subsequent sacking from his position in 2021. The case is being examined as part of the broader independent public inquiry being chaired by Lady Elish Angiolini.

Following his arrest, Carrick pleaded guilty to multiple counts of rape between 2002 and 2021. In 2023, he was sentenced to life imprisonment, with a minimum term of more than thirty years. He received an additional life sentence in 2025 after two more victims came forward.

== Early life and education ==
David Carrick was born in Salisbury, Wiltshire, on 4 January 1975. At the time of his birth, Carrick's parents, a cleaner and a Royal Artillery soldier, lived at Bulford military camp in Wiltshire. After the birth of his sister, the family moved to nearby Durrington. Carrick went to Durrington comprehensive school. His parents divorced when he was a teenager.

== Career and criminality ==
After a short career in the British Army, Carrick became an officer with the Metropolitan Police (Met) in 2001, initially serving as a response officer in South London, before he joined the armed Parliamentary and Diplomatic Protection (PaDP) branch in 2009.

Although both the Met and other British police forces received multiple complaints about his behaviour, including an investigation for domestic abuse in 2002, Carrick was re-certified to remain an armed police officer in 2017. Work colleagues gave Carrick the nickname Bastard Dave, due to his propensity for cruelty.

Between 2003 and 2020, Carrick abused and raped multiple women he met using the dating sites Badoo and Tinder, often in Hertfordshire. Using his job as a police officer to gain their trust and inflate his apparent importance, he developed several abusive relationships. Carrick degraded his victims via physical abuse with a belt, imprisonment in small spaces, urinating on them and rape. In some cases he controlled what his victims wore, when or what they ate, and where they slept. He would sometimes ban them from eating altogether.

In October 2021, a woman reported to the police that Carrick had date raped her a year earlier, deciding to come forward the day after Wayne Couzens, who served in the same unit as Carrick, was sentenced for the rape and murder of Sarah Everard.

== Legal proceedings ==
On 2 October 2021, Carrick was arrested at his home in Hertfordshire. On body-worn video, he is heard to say: "There's no necessity", regarding his arrest. Carrick was suspended from police work.

Forty officers and staff were assigned to Carrick's case, all were required to give written undertakings not to disclose information about the case, in order to stop leaks from reaching the press. Carrick initially pleaded not guilty to all the charges. In May 2022, he was held on remand at HM Prison Belmarsh in south-east London. In December 2022, at the Old Bailey criminal court in Central London, Carrick then pleaded guilty to 49 charges, including 24 of rape; the charges related to twelve female victims. On 16 January 2023, at Southwark Crown Court, he pleaded guilty to four more charges of rape.

Sadiq Khan, Mayor of London, reacted with a statement that he was "absolutely sickened and appalled". Crown Prosecution Service Chief Prosecutor Jaswant Narwal was quoted as stating "the scale of the degradation Carrick subjected his victims to is unlike anything I have encountered in my 34 years with the Crown Prosecution Service".

In the wake of Carrick's conviction, the Metropolitan Police said the force was re-examining past claims of domestic abuse or sexual offences against its officers and staff, affecting about 1,000 of its 45,000 employees.

Carrick's sentencing hearing at Southwark Crown Court began on 6 February 2023. The following day, he received 36 life sentences with a minimum term of 30 years plus 239 days, meaning he must serve that time in prison before becoming eligible for parole. He will become eligible for parole on 2 May 2052.

On 8 February 2023, the Attorney General's Office announced that, after "multiple requests", they would be reviewing the sentence under the Unduly Lenient Sentence Scheme. On 3 March, Michael Tomlinson, the Solicitor General for England and Wales, said that he was satisfied the sentencing judge, Bobbie Cheema-Grubb, "gave careful and detailed consideration to all the features of this case" when deciding how much time Carrick would spend in prison, and that the sentencing would not be sent to the Court of Appeal for review.

In July 2023 it was announced that six of Carrick's victims were intending to sue the Metropolitan Police for breaching their human rights by failing to investigate properly.

On 20 July 2023 the Independent Office for Police Conduct (IOPC) announced that it was starting four investigations into the way the Metropolitan Police had handled complaints against Carrick. The IOPC also announced that it was conducting a similar investigation into Wiltshire Police. On 18 October 2023, it was reported that a total of 12 serving and former police officers were being investigated for misconduct in relation to the handling of allegations made against Carrick. On 7 June 2024, it was reported that two police officers from Wiltshire Police had been issued with final written warnings over how they had failed to investigate an allegation of sexual abuse made against Carrick in 2016.

On 7 October 2024, it was reported that Carrick had been charged with more offences. These included five counts of indecent assault of a girl under 14 in Salisbury that took place in 1989 and 1990. Carrick was also charged with two counts of rape, one count of sexual assault and one count of coercive and controlling behaviour of another woman between 2014 and 2019 in Stevenage. He appeared at Westminster Magistrates Court on 17 October 2024. On 14 November 2024, he appeared at the Old Bailey via videolink from HMP Full Sutton, where he pleaded not guilty to all of the new charges. Mark Lucraft KC, the Recorder of London, set a provisional trial date of 3 November 2025 and another pre-trial hearing was due to take place on 14 March 2025. On 14 March 2025, Carrick appeared at the Old Bailey via videolink. Lucraft confirmed 3 November as the trial date for the new charges and a further hearing would take place on 27 June 2025. The trial of Carrick for these charges began on 4 November 2025 at the Old Bailey, and on 19 November he was found guilty on all counts. The next day Carrick was sentenced to life imprisonment with a minimum term of 30 years.

=== Outline of victims, offending, offences and sentences ===
The following details regarding the victims and the background to the offences, as well as the specific counts on the indictments and sentences are taken from the sentencing remarks by sentencing judge Bobbie Cheema-Grubb.

Victim	Background	Count/Offences		Law	Sentence
T	Just over a year after becoming an officer (i.e. about 2002), Carrick met T, aged 20, in a bar, inviting her to a house warming party at his flat. T felt reassured when Carrick stated he was the 'safest person' she could be with as he was a police officer. However, there was no party and Carrick held T against her will for hours, raping her vaginally and anally, using violence to hold her down. When T struggled, Carrick put a handgun to her head. She thought she was going to be raped and killed. Carrick forced his penis into T's mouth, biting and bruising her. Attending hospital after the assaults, a nurse remarked that it was not the first time she had heard about a police officer raping someone, when T told her the details she knew of her attacker. The nurse stated it would be difficult to get the case to court as the law protected 'their own'.	Count 1	False imprisonment	Common law	Life imprisonment
T		Count 2	Multiple vaginal rapes	Section 1 of the Sexual Offences Act 1956	Life imprisonment
T		Count 3	Multiple vaginal rapes	Section 1 of the Sexual Offences Act 1956	Life imprisonment
T		Count 4	Anal rapes	Section 1 of the Sexual Offences Act 1956	Life imprisonment
T		Count 5	Anal rapes	Section 1 of the Sexual Offences Act 1956	Life imprisonment
T		Count 6	Indecent assault	Section 14 of the Sexual Offences Act 1956	9 years' imprisonment (concurrent)
M	M was a fellow police officer that Carrick met when working on the same team in Spring 2004. M and Carrick had flirted and on returning to his flat, anticipated they would have vaginal sex. However, Carrick ignored her objections and raped M anally, stating it was 'what he did'.	Count 1 (main indictment)	Anal rape	Section 1 of the Sexual Offences Act 2003	Life imprisonment
F	F was a 21-year-old barmaid that Carrick met in 2008, when he was stationed in Barnet. Carrick was 12 years older than her. She became a police officer and they bought a house together. Carrick vaginally and anally raped F many times. F did not think she would be believed if she told anyone what had happened, including police colleagues. Carrick brandished a knife at her when she threatened to leave him, slashing her work shirts.	Count 2	Vaginal rape	Section 1 of the Sexual Offences Act 2003	Life imprisonment
F	F was a 21-year-old barmaid that Carrick met in 2008, when he was stationed in Barnet. Carrick was 12 years older than her. She became a police officer and they bought a house together. Carrick vaginally and anally raped F many times. F did not think she would be believed if she told anyone what had happened, including police colleagues. Carrick brandished a knife at her when she threatened to leave him, slashing her work shirts.	Count 3	Anal rape	Section 1 of the Sexual Offences Act 2003	Life imprisonment
F	F was a 21-year-old barmaid that Carrick met in 2008, when he was stationed in Barnet. Carrick was 12 years older than her. She became a police officer and they bought a house together. Carrick vaginally and anally raped F many times. F did not think she would be believed if she told anyone what had happened, including police colleagues. Carrick brandished a knife at her when she threatened to leave him, slashing her work shirts.	Count 4	Anal rape (at least twice)	Section 1 of the Sexual Offences Act 2003	Life imprisonment
D	D was a member of a martial arts club that Carrick was part of. In 2009, D had become upset at a social event and Carrick took her home. However, he took D to his flat where he got her naked, forcibly putting his fingers inside her vagina.	Count 10	Assault by penetration	Section 2 of the Sexual Offences Act 2003	Life imprisonment
N	N had attended school with Carrick, and the pair reconnected at a reunion in 2009. The pair then attended another reunion during the August Bank holiday of 2009. N, now married, shared a room with another woman and Carrick, sharing a bed with Carrick. She remonstrated when Carrick kept touching her intimately. As she left the bed to share a different bed with her friend, Carrick dragged her back, holding N's arms behind her back and telling her it would be his 'little secret'. N did not want to do anything with Carrick, resisting, however, Carrick penetrated her vagina and anus with his fingers, then attempted to rape her.	Count 5	Assault by penetration	Section 2 of the Sexual Offences Act 2003	Life imprisonment
N		Count 6	Assault by penetration	Section 2 of the Sexual Offences Act 2003	Life imprisonment
N		Count 7	Attempted rape	Section 1 of the Criminal Attempts Act 1981, with section 1 of the Sexual Offences Act 2003	Life imprisonment
S	S was a member of a martial arts club that Carrick was part of. After a social evening in 2009, where the pair had been drinking, Carrick charmed her into returning home with him, to spend the night together. However, when at home and naked, Carrick became aggressive, forcibly pinning S on the bed, scaring her and challenging her to overcome him. Carrick attempted to rape her, but could not maintain an erection, which angered him. Encountering S on a later occasion, he made public comments that humiliated her.	Count 9	Attempted vaginal rape	Section 1 of the Criminal Attempts Act 1981, with section 1 of the Sexual Offences Act 2003	Life imprisonment
K	K and Carrick knew each other from school and were friends. Having met her in 2015, Carrick told her he was a police officer, with K being attracted to him. After Carrick started to have anal sex with K, she told him to stop as it hurt her. Carrick ignored her, resulting in K being in pain for days afterwards. K did not feel as if she could report the rape to the police, as Carrick was a police officer.	Count 8	Anal rape	Section 1 of the Sexual Offences Act 2003	Life imprisonment
B	B and Carrick met through a dating app and were in a relationship for six months. At the time they met, B was in a vulnerable position, as, at the time, she was in an unhappy marriage. Carrick was intense with his charm and B quickly agreed to move in with him, being reassured that Carrick was a police officer. Carrick offered B £1,000 a month to be his 'slut'. Carrick did not want the woman to bring her daughter with her when she moved in, however, she did, and the 10-year-old heard some of the abuse her mother suffered, including hearing her being raped. Over their six month relationship, Carrick cut B off from most of her family and friends, watching her while he was at work through a camera he had set up at their home. Carrick supervised what B could eat, resulting in her dropping from a size 14 to a size 6 in the span of a couple of months. Having undergone an operation to remove haemorrhoids, Carrick forced B to have anal sex with him and in what was a violent and angry rape, with B in intense pain. She fought Carrick, with Carrick tearing her anus. On another occasion, B did not want to have oral sex, as her daughter's friends were staying at the address and they may have heard the couple, however, Carrick forced B to take his penis in her mouth, humiliating her, gagging her, so B struggled to breathe. By the time B escaped from Carrick, she was suicidal.	Count 11	Anal rape	Section 1 of the Sexual Offences Act 2003	Life imprisonment
B		Count 12	Oral rape	Section 1 of the Sexual Offences Act 2003	Life imprisonment
B		Count 13	Oral rape	Section 1 of the Sexual Offences Act 2003	Life imprisonment
B		Count 14	Oral rape	Section 1 of the Sexual Offences Act 2003	Life imprisonment
B		Count 15	Oral rape ×2 (multiple offending)	Section 1 of the Sexual Offences Act 2003	Life imprisonment
B		Count 16	Coercive and controlling behaviour	Section 76 of the Serious Crime Act 2015	4 years' imprisonment (concurrent)
J	J and Carrick met in a bar in Ely, where he had been socialising with other officers. Wooing J with charm, the relationship developed quickly and the pair were in a relationship from March 2017 to January 2019. J was reassured that Carrick was a police officer. However, Carrick told J that she belonged to him and as a result, had to obey him; on one occasion sending her a photo from work of his firearm with the message 'remember I am the boss'. He humiliated J by calling her a 'whore' and 'prostitute'. Carrick controlled who J saw, what she did, ate and wore, even what side of the pavement she was allowed to walk. Carrick threatened J with a police baton and belittled her job as a mental health nurse, deriding people with mental health issues, including her son, whom she stopped J from seeing for a year. Carrick tracked J using a camera in his house, speaking to her through it, accusing her of being lazy. Carrick was aggressive to J sexually, raping her anally and orally on many occasions, resulting in J sometimes bleeding from her anus. On one occasion, Carrick made J have anal sex in a tent that was next to another her parents were in on holiday, covering J's mouth. J felt unable to cry out for help when her father entered the tent to ask if she was ok. During orally raping J, Carrick would cause her to gag and vomit, but carried on regardless. Carrick gave J a sexually transmitted disease and gained sexual excitement from urinating on her and within her mouth, making J swallow his urine. Carrick attempted to fist J and made her lick his anus. He used police-issued handcuffs to restrain J when he raped her. Carrick left welts on J's bottom from whipping her, either as part of sex or as a punishment; when J escaped from Carrick, she took the whip to 'save other women from harm'. Carrick would shut J naked in a small under-stairs cupboard as a punishment, even whilst she had a panic attack, with Carrick standing and whistling outside. Carrick 'drilled into' J that he was the police, the law and owned her. J did not report Carrick to police, thinking the police would investigate it and she would not be believed, terrified at becoming a target of Carrick. It was only when he was arrested, that J got the confidence to speak out.	Count 17	False imprisonment	Common law	Life imprisonment
J		Count 18	False imprisonment ×9 (multiple incident)	Common law	Life imprisonment
J		Count 19	Controlling or coercive behaviour	Section 76 of the Serious Crime Act 2015	4 years' imprisonment (concurrent)
J		Count 20	Anal rape	Section 1 of the Sexual Offences Act 2003	Life imprisonment
J		Count 21	Anal rape ×9 (multiple incident)	Section 1 of the Sexual Offences Act 2003	Life imprisonment
J		Count 22	Oral rape	Section 1 of the Sexual Offences Act 2003	Life imprisonment
J		Count 23	Oral rape ×9 (multiple incident)	Section 1 of the Sexual Offences Act 2003	Life imprisonment
J		Count 24	Sexual assault	Section 3 of the Sexual Offences Act 2003	7 years' imprisonment (concurrent)
J		Count 25	Sexual assault ×4	Section 3 of the Sexual Offences Act 2003	7 years' imprisonment (concurrent)
J		Count 26	Assault by penetration	Section 2 of the Sexual Offences Act 2003	Life imprisonment
J		Count 27	Causing a person to engage in sexual activity without consent	Section 4 of the Sexual Offences Act 2003	Life imprisonment
W	W was on a dating site that Carrick was on whilst in a relationship with J. The pair met in 2018 and Carrick told her he was a police officer. W was a cleaner and Carrick told her he wanted her to clean for him, having carried out a 'police force check' on W. W trusted Carrick because of his job. Carrick showed texts that he had sent to J which made W feel sorry for her, at how inappropriate and abusive they were. One day, when W was cleaning Carrick's shower, he attacked her whilst he was naked, putting his penis in her mouth, where she gagged and was unable to breathe. Carrick ejaculated in her mouth and W was sick.	Count 28	Oral rape	Section 1 of the Sexual Offences Act 2003	Life imprisonment
P	P was on a dating site that Carrick was on whilst in a relationship with J. P was a vulnerable woman with a mild learning disability and also experienced anxiety. It would have been apparent to Carrick that P was unable to speak up for herself confidently. Carrick told P that he worked as an armed police officer and Carrick's relationship with P was exploitative. P would attend Carrick's address and clean for him and to begin with, Carrick was funny and nice to her. However, under the influence of alcohol, Carrick changed into a 'monster'. P wanted Carrick to like her, but he treated her as a slave, calling her this. Carrick orally raped P and on at least three occasions, put his penis so far down her throat that she gagged, being unable to breathe and vomited, which excited Carrick. On occasions when P performed oral sex on Carrick, he urinated into her mouth and onto her body. Carrick forced a dildo into her anus until P was screaming. He also attempted to force his fist into her. When P screamed, Carrick shoved her into the shower, urinating over her, causing P to vomit.	Count 29	Sexual assault	Section 3 of the Sexual Offences Act 2003	4 years' imprisonment (concurrent)
P		Count 30	Sexual assault (urinating in mouth)	Section 3 of the Sexual Offences Act 2003	4 years' imprisonment (concurrent)
P		Count 31	Sexual assault (urinating in vaginal area)	Section 3 of the Sexual Offences Act 2003	4 years' imprisonment (concurrent)
P		Count 32	Sexual assault (urinating on body)	Section 3 of the Sexual Offences Act 2003	4 years' imprisonment (concurrent)
P		Count 33	Oral rape	Section 1 of the Sexual Offences Act 2003	Life imprisonment
P		Count 34	Oral rape	Section 1 of the Sexual Offences Act 2003	Life imprisonment
P		Count 35	Oral rape	Section 1 of the Sexual Offences Act 2003	Life imprisonment
P		Count 36	Assault by penetration (using dildo)	Section 2 of the Sexual Offences Act 2003	Life imprisonment
P		Count 37	Attempted assault by penetration	Section 1 of the Criminal Attempts Act 1981	Life imprisonment
P		Count 38	Sexual assault (hitting with belt)	Section 3 of the Sexual Offences Act 2003	4 years' imprisonment (concurrent)
F	F and Carrick met through a dating site in February 2020 and she moved in with him in March, leaving in July that year. Because he was a police officer, F believed Carrick was trustworthy. Carrick quickly gained control over F's behaviour and time. F was afraid of Carrick because of his aggression and due to him threatening to report her to the immigration authorities. On the first occasion Carrick anally raped F, she cried from pain and her anus bled; Carrick's response was that she was 'making a fuss'. On each occasion, F told Carrick she did not want to do anal sex, but Carrick disregarded clear objections and subdued her. As he had done so with other victims, Carrick forced his penis into F's mouth and urinated, or urinated over her face. In July 2021, a year after F had left Carrick, the allegations came to Hertfordshire Police's notice.	Count 39	Coercive and controlling behaviour	Section 76 of the Serious Crime Act 2015	4 years' imprisonment (concurrent)
F		Count 40	Anal rapes ×5	Section 1 of the Sexual Offences Act 2003	Life imprisonment
F		Count 41	Anal rapes ×5	Section 1 of the Sexual Offences Act 2003	Life imprisonment
F		Count 42	Multiple sexual assaults	Section 3 of the Sexual Offences Act 2003	4 years' imprisonment (concurrent)
F		Count 43	Multiple sexual assaults	Section 3 of the Sexual Offences Act 2003	4 years' imprisonment (concurrent)
Unknown	On Friday 1 October 2021, a woman made a complaint that Carrick had raped her in August 2020. However, no evidence was offered at court and a not guilty plea was entered by Carrick. When Carrick was arrested and charged for this offence on 3 October 2021, and this was publicised, victims began to provide accounts.	Count 44	Rape	Section 1 of the Sexual Offences Act 2003	No sentence
		Total counts:	Total offences:	Total sentence:	
		49 counts	1 count of attempted assault by penetration; 1 count of attempted rape; 1 count of attempted rape; 1 count of causing a person to engage in sexual activity without consent; 1 count of false imprisonment; 1 count of indecent assault; 2 counts of false imprisonment; 3 count of coercive and controlling behaviour; 5 counts of assault by penetration; 9 counts of sexual assault; 24 counts of rape	36 life sentences with a minimum term of 30 years plus 239 days	

== Personal life ==
Before being jailed, Carrick lived in Stevenage, Hertfordshire. While being held on remand, he reportedly attempted suicide.
