= Graeme Perks =

British plastic surgeon

Graeme Perks FRCS FRACS
- Born: Anthony Graeme Bowman Perks; October 1955 (age 70)
- Occupation: Physician
- Medical career
- Profession: Plastic surgeon
- Institutions: Nottingham University Hospitals NHS Trust
- Sub-specialties: Reconstructive and microsurgery

Anthony Graeme Bowman Perks (born October 1955) is a British plastic surgeon, and the former president of the British Association of Plastic, Reconstructive and Aesthetic Surgeons (BAPRAS). He was a specialist in microsurgical reconstruction after cancer surgery, and the former head of the Department of Plastic, Reconstructive and Burns Surgery at Nottingham University Hospitals NHS Trust.

== Career ==
Perks qualified as a surgeon in England and is a fellow of the Royal College of Surgeons (FRCS). He later practised in Australia and became a fellow of the Royal Australasian College of Surgeons (FRACS). In the 1990s he returned to the United Kingdom and became the head of the Department of Plastic, Reconstructive and Burns Surgery at Nottingham University Hospitals NHS Trust.

He is a specialist in microsurgical reconstruction after cancer surgery, In 2019, he called for greater evidence to be produced to establish the causes of what has been called breast implant illness (BII), saying of BII that it was in the patient's head and not in their breasts. He is the former president of the British Association of Plastic, Reconstructive and Aesthetic Surgeons (BAPRAS).

He retired at the end of 2020.

== Personal life ==
Perks lives with his wife and one of their four children in Halam Hill, Halam, Nottinghamshire.

In 2021, Perks sustained life-threatening injuries after being attacked with a knife by colleague and doctor Jonathan Brooks at his home in Hallam. Brooks was later convicted of attempted murder, and sentenced to life in prison with a minimum term of 22 years.

== Selected publications ==
- "A Prospective Assessment of Shoulder Morbidity and Recovery Time Scales following Latissimus Dorsi Breast Reconstruction", Plastic and Reconstructive Surgery, Vol. 122, No. 5 (November 2008), pp. 1334–40. (Joint author) doi: 10.1097/PRS.0b013e3181881ffe
- Pathways in Prosthetic Joint Infection. Oxford University Press, Oxford, 2018. (Joint author) ISBN 978-0198791881
- "In search of evidence-based plastic surgery: the problems faced by the specialty". British Journal of Plastic Surgery, Vol. 53, No. 5 (July 2000), pp. 427–433.
