= Angiolini Inquiry =

UK public inquiry

The Angiolini Inquiry
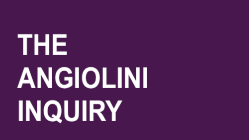
- Date: 2021 – (in progress)
- Location: London, United Kingdom
- Participants: Rt. Hon. Lady Elish Angiolini KC (Chairwoman)
- Website: www.angiolini.independent-inquiry.uk

On 22 November 2021, Lady Elish Angiolini KC was commissioned by then Home Secretary, Priti Patel, to conduct an independent inquiry as to how off-duty Metropolitan Police officer, Wayne Couzens, had the ability to kidnap, rape, and murder Sarah Everard, a member of the public. The inquiry aimed to provide a full explanation as to the causes and factors contributing to her murder, and improve recognition of potential sexual and murderous predators to improve the safety of women in public spaces.

The inquiry has been expanded multiple times to consider wider policing standards and culture in relation to sexually motivated violence against women, as well as to establish the circumstances surrounding the behaviour and conduct of former Metropolitan Police officer and serial rapist David Carrick.

== Background ==
On the evening of 3 March 2021, 33-year-old Sarah Everard was kidnapped in South London, England by off-duty Metropolitan Police constable Wayne Couzens. Couzens identified himself as a police officer, handcuffing Everard, and placing her in his car, before driving her to a location near Dover where he raped and strangled her, before burning her body and disposing of her remains in a nearby pond.

== Inquiry ==
=== Setting up of the Inquiry ===
Following Couzens' sentence to a whole life order on 30 September 2021, on 22 November 2021, Patel announced to Parliament that an independent inquiry was being launched under the management of Lady Angiolini. Patel stated that the inquiry would be over two parts, with the first establishing how Couzens "was able to serve as a police officer for so long and seek to establish definitive account of his conduct", as well as seeking to understanding "the extent to which his behaviour rang alarm bells with his colleagues."

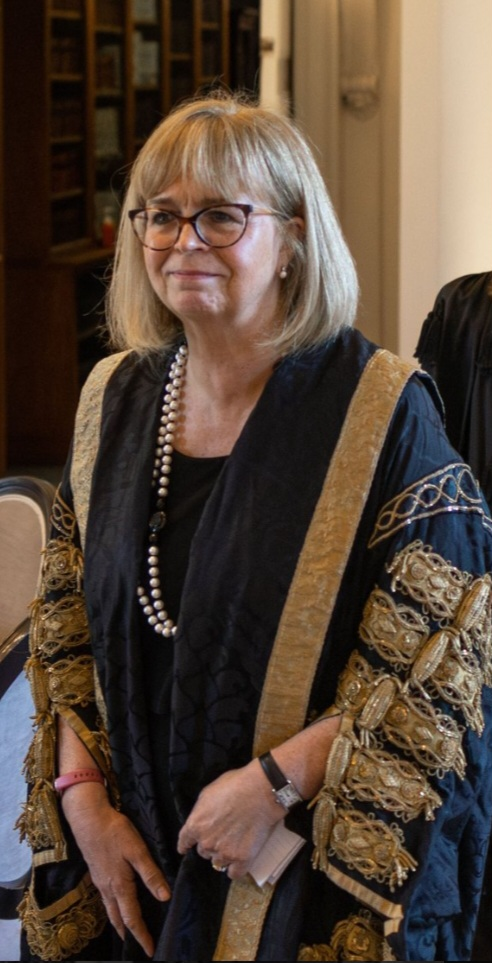
Lady Elish Angiolini KC

With the Angiolini Inquiry being designated as a non-statutory inquiry, it meant Everard's family could be given "closure as quickly as possible", with a statutory inquiry's recommendations not being made for a "number of years". Despite this, the inquiry has experienced a number of delays due to ongoing legal and misconduct proceedings.

The inquiry interviewed 144 witnesses, which included current and former police officers and staff, as well as other relevant organisations and members of the public.

=== Part 1 ===
On 10 January 2022, the terms of reference for Part 1 of the inquiry were set as to 'establish a comprehensive account of the career and overall conduct of the killer of Sarah Everard, to identify any missed opportunities, and to make recommendations based on the findings.'

Patel asked Angiolini to conclude the first part of the inquiry within nine months from when the terms of reference were set. Whilst work started immediately, there were some delays, due to Couzens, at that time, facing ongoing legal and misconduct proceedings, limiting some aspects of the inquiry proceeding.

The aim of the first part of the inquiry was to 'establish a definitive account of the career and conduct' of Couzens. The report also looked at the years before the incident, establishing a timeline ending at the point where he kidnapped, raped and murdered Everard.

On 29 February 2024, the first part of the Angiolini Inquiry was published. Home Secretary James Cleverly made a statement in the House of Commons in response to the report's publication.

=== Timeline of career ===
Month	Year	Event	Organisation
December	2006	Joins Kent Police as a Special Constable (SC)	Kent Police
May	2008	Submits application to join Kent Police as a regular officer. Application fails at financial vetting stage (having entered into an Individual Voluntary Arrangement in February 2007, due to financial difficulties)	Kent Police
May	2008	Applies and is interviewed for promotion to the equivalent rank of sergeant in the Special Constabulary (known as 'section officer'). Successful at interview and is promoted	Kent Police
October	2009	Submits application to join the Civil Nuclear Constabulary. Passes the recruitment vetting checks and the fitness test (on the second attempt)	Kent Police
September	2010	Resigns from Kent Police Special Constabulary	Kent Police
March	2011	Appointed to full-time role as a Police Constable (PC) with the Civil Nuclear Constabulary	Civil Nuclear Constabulary
June	2011	Granted National Security Vetting clearance at the level of Developed Vetting	Civil Nuclear Constabulary
July	2011	Posted as an authorised firearms officer (AFO) at Sellafield, Cumbria	Civil Nuclear Constabulary
Early (unknown month)	2012	Applies for and is granted voluntary transfer to Dungeness, Kent	Civil Nuclear Constabulary
March	2013	Successfully completes two-year probation	Civil Nuclear Constabulary
Unknown	2013	Studies for sergeant's exam, intending to take this in 2014	Civil Nuclear Constabulary
Unknown	2013	Applies to join Kent Police, with his application rejected at the shortlisting stage	Civil Nuclear Constabulary
January	2014	Applies to and is successful in joining the Strategic Escort Group	Civil Nuclear Constabulary
July	2014	Deployed to the Strategic Escort Group, where he later claims to several people he has been deployed overseas, with this being a lie	Civil Nuclear Constabulary
Mid (unknown month)	2016	Looks for opportunities to move on from the Civil Nuclear Constabulary	Civil Nuclear Constabulary
September	2016	Returns to substantive post at Dungeness, Kent	Civil Nuclear Constabulary
June	2016	Starts another application to join Kent Police, but doesn't submit this	Civil Nuclear Constabulary
February	2017	Submits another application to join Kent Police, but withdraws this a few months later	Civil Nuclear Constabulary
May	2018	Applies to join the Metropolitan Police. He later tells them he would "prefer not to transfer" as an AFO, wanting to be considered for frontline policing on response or to qualify as a detective	Civil Nuclear Constabulary
September	2018	Couzens leaves the Civil Nuclear Constabulary, with his application to join the Metropolitan Police being successful	Civil Nuclear Constabulary
September	2018	Assigned to Bromley Basic Command Unit, where his vetting level, since downgraded, is transferred across	Metropolitan Police
November	2018	Having almost finished a course for rejoiners and transferees, he is told he would need to undergo a full 18-week foundation course for new recruits as well as a two-year probationary period	Metropolitan Police
February	2019	Having completed training, he is deployed to Bromley Emergency Response on Team B	Metropolitan Police
Late February	2019	Submits application to transfer to the Parliamentary and Diplomatic Protection Command. His first application is unsuccessful	Metropolitan Police
June	2019	Submits a further application to transfer to the Parliamentary and Diplomatic Protection Command, where he passes an interview, risk assessment process and training courses	Metropolitan Police
February	2020	Posted to the Parliamentary and Diplomatic Protection Command at Lillie Road Base	Metropolitan Police
March	2020	Having only been in his role with the Parliamentary and Diplomatic Protection Command for a month, he submits an application to rejoin the Civil Nuclear Constabulary. Despite reaching and passing the interview stage, he withdraws his application	Metropolitan Police
July	2020	Having been with the Parliamentary and Diplomatic Protection Command for approximately five months, he is signed off work for three weeks, due to sustaining an injury to his left index finger. He told the Metropolitan Police this was from an accident from a drill whilst completing DIY (it would later emerge this was a purposeful action to self-harm)	Metropolitan Police
August	2020	He is assessed and deemed fit for 'recuperative duties', consisting of office-based work, mainly from home, in the Counter Terrorism Protect and Prepare Unit	Metropolitan Police
Mid October to late November	2020	Receives virtual physiotherapy from the Police Rehabilitation Centre	Metropolitan Police
December	2020	Discharged from Occupational Health having passed a medical functionality test	Metropolitan Police
January	2021	Passes the job-related fitness test on the second attempt	Metropolitan Police
February	2021	Completes necessary firearms and TASER re-training. During requalifying, he works with officers on COVID-19 patrols, enforcing the Regulations in force at the time	Metropolitan Police
Mid-February	2021	Firearms authority is reinstated and he resumes duties as an AFO based at Lillie Road	Metropolitan Police
2 March	2021	Completes what will be his last shift with the Parliamentary and Diplomatic Protection Command, posted to guard a protected site	Metropolitan Police
16 July	2021	Dismissed without notice for gross misconduct after admitting the kidnap and murder of Everard	Metropolitan Police

=== Timeline of Couzens' offending ===
Month	Year	Offence (potential related legislation)	Details	Charge/Sentence
Unspecified date(s)	Between 1992 and 1997	Unlawful Sexual intercourse (Sexual Offences Act 1956)	Couzens allegedly sexually assaulted a child. This may have been in relation to his alleged relationship with a 14-year-old when he was 23-years-old (the Angiolini Inquiry mentions that 'due to her being too young to consent, any sexual activity with the victim would have been a crime. The alleged sexual assault was, and remains today, serious sexual offending whether compared with the Sexual Offences Act 1956 in force at the time or the law that applies today'). The allegation wasn't reported at the time.	Not subject to a police investigation
Unspecified date(s)	1995	Unspecified motoring offence	In his early twenties, Couzens declared on application forms he had been found guilty of a driving offence in 1995.	Guilty. Sentence unknown
Unspecified date(s)	1995	Attempted Kidnapping (Criminal Attempts Act 1981)	A woman reported an unidentified man had attempted to kidnap her at knifepoint in North London. Following his arrest for the offences related to Everard, the woman contacted the police, stating she recognised him from photos in the media as the man who had attempted to kidnap her. Couzens was arrested and questioned in relation to this offence in March 2022.	No further action due to "evidential difficulties"
Early Spring	2003	Unknown	Whilst in the Territorial Army, a woman alleged that he acted in an 'intimidating manner' towards her during an event. This included him blocking her path and demanding her for her telephone number. She didn't report this to police at the time, however, identified Couzens after his photo was published following his arrest. She stated how Couzens was "intimidating", making her feel "deeply uncomfortable." She didn't wish to provide a statement to make a complaint.	No further action due to victim not making a complaint
Unspecified date(s)	2004	Possession of extreme pornography (Obscene Publications Act 1857 (the offence occurred before the more modern legislation regarding extreme pornography within Section 63 of the Criminal Justice and Immigration Act 2008))	Whilst socialising with a group of reservists, Couzens is alleged to have shown pornographic videos, showing violent and extreme sex acts, including bestiality. On his arrest for the offences in connection with Everard, this was reported to the Metropolitan Police, whereby Couzens was arrested in relation to possession the extreme pornography in March 2022.	No further action due to "evidential difficulties"
Summer	2004	Indecent exposure (s66 Sexual Offences Act 2003)	Whilst in South London, Couzens allegedly exposed himself to a teenage girl, masturbating whilst driving. She did not report this at the time, but later recognised Couzens in media related to his involvement in Everard's kidnap, rape and murder, reporting this to the Metropolitan Police in late 2021. Couzens was arrested and interviewed in relation to the allegation in March 2022.	No further action due to insufficient evidence
Late 2006 to early 2007		Attempted rape (Criminal Attempts Act 1981)	During an event in London, it was alleged that Couzens attempted to rape a woman. She did not report this at the time, but contacted the Metropolitan Police after believing she recognised him as the suspect from images of him in the media in relation to his involvement in Everard's case and he was arrested and interviewed in relation to the allegation in March 2022.	No further action due to insufficient evidence
July	2007	Theft (s1 Theft Act 1968)	Having left the Territorial Army, Couzens failed to return equipment and uniform, being charged £526 as a result. Couzens did not pay the charge or return the equipment and uniform.	No criminal investigation launched
Between May 2008 and September 2010		Sexual harassment (s26 Equality Act 2010)	Couzens allegedly left six photographs on a young woman's phone, showing his semi-erect and erect penis. He was confronted about this but "laughed it off and said it was nothing". This incident was not reported at the time or after his arrest and conviction in relation to offences he committed against Everard.	No criminal investigation launched
Between May 2008 and September 2010		Sexual assault (s3 Sexual Offences Act 2003)	Whilst applying a plaster to a young woman's leg, Couzens allegedly made her feel "extremely uncomfortable" when he lifted her skirt higher than required, proceeding to "very slightly" squeeze her knee.This incident was not reported at the time or after his arrest and conviction in relation to offences he committed against Everard.	No criminal investigation launched
Between May 2008 and September 2010		Sexual assault (s3 Sexual Offences Act 2003)	Whilst in a car home from a social event, Couzens allegedly put his hand underneath a woman's dress, touching her over her underwear. This incident was not reported at the time or after his arrest and conviction in relation to offences he committed against Everard.	No criminal investigation launched
21 November	2008	Indecent exposure (s66 Sexual Offences Act 2003)	Couzens allegedly exposed himself, masturbating in front of a woman whilst he was on foot in South London. The victim reported this incident on the same day. Officers attended the scene and despite not taking a statement, recorded the crime, with no suspect identified. After Couzens' arrest for offences against Everard, the victim of the indecent exposure approached police stating she believed Couzens was the suspect. Couzens was arrested and interviewed in relation to the allegation in March 2022.	No further action due to insufficient evidence
2008		Indecent exposure (s66 Sexual Offences Act 2003)	Couzens allegedly exposed himself to Magic FM DJ Emma Wilson, known as Emma B, as she walked past an alleyway in Greenwich, south-east London. Wilson reported this to police, but alleged how officers laughed at her when she did so. When Couzens photo was published in news reports related to his involvement in offences against Everard, Wilson recognised him, with the Metropolitan Police re-investigating her complaint.	Unknown
2013		Unspecified motoring offence	Couzens commits two motoring offences on two separate occasions in 2013 and 2014. Specific details are unknown.	Unknown
2014		Unspecified motoring offence	Couzens commits two motoring offences on two separate occasions in 2013 and 2014. Specific details are unknown.	Unknown
9 June	2015	Indecent exposure (s66 Sexual Offences Act 2003)	Couzens allegedly exposed his erect penis whilst driving a car in Dover town centre. The incident was reported the same day to Kent Police, with Couzens being identified as the registered keeper of the involved vehicle. However, the investigation did not progress, with Couzens not being questioned regarding the report. After his arrest for the abduction, rape and murder of Everard, the case was reopened and he was charged with indecent exposure in September 2022. In February 2023, he entered a not guilty plea to the offence.	Court accepting the request of the prosecution for the offence to 'lie on the file'
Between March and October	2019	Sending grossly offensive messages on a public communications network (s1 Communications Act 2003)	After his arrest for the kidnap, rape and murder of Everard, material within a WhatsApp group that Couzens and other officers in the Metropolitan Police were in emerged. Inappropriate and grossly offensive messages were sent by Couzens, including making obscene sexual and mocking comments about domestic abuse victims, as well as comments that discriminated about people's race and ethnicity.	Not investigated due to criminal proceedings occurring in relation to offences against Everard
Summer	2019	Sexual assault (s3 Sexual Offences Act 2003)	Couzens allegedly sexually assaulted a man who was in drag at a Kent bar, touching him inappropriately. This led to a confrontation where Couzens told the victim he was a police officer. He invited the victim outside to perform a sex act. This incident was reported after Couzens was arrested in relation to offences in connection with Everard.	Unknown
October	2019	Rape (s1 Sexual Offences Act 2003)	Couzens allegedly raped a woman under a bridge in London. This was reported to police in March 2020, however, the investigation was closed due to a suspect not being identified. In April 2021, the victim recontacted police having seen Couzens image on the news in relation to his involvement in Everard's case and identified him as her attacker. Couzens was arrested and interviewed in relation to the report in March 2022.	No further action due to "evidential difficulties"
13 November	2020	Indecent exposure (s66 Sexual Offences Act 2003)	Couzens exposed himself to a female cyclist, masturbating while standing next to woodland on a country lane in Ringwould, Kent near to his address. The same day, she reported this to police, but the investigation closed after no suspect was identified. Later, the victim contacted police, identifying a photo of Couzens in the media after his arrest for offences related to Everard, as the suspect who had exposed himself. Couzens was interviewed and police explained this to him, however, he provided 'no comment' to questions. He was charged with indecent exposure in August 2022.	Pleaded guilty, sentenced to 19-months-imprisonment in March 2023
4 December	2020	Sending grossly offensive messages on a public communications network (s1 Communications Act 2003)	Whilst working from home when an officer with the Metropolitan Police, Couzens allegedly sent an unsolicited photo to an online clothing vendor of his erect penis. This incident was not reported to police.	No investigation due to no report being made
3 February	2021	Indecent exposure (s66 Sexual Offences Act 2003)	Couzens allegedly indecently exposed his erect penis whilst on foot in Kent. The victim reported the incident the same day, however, as a suspect wasn't identified, the investigation was closed on the same day. After Couzens arrest for the kidnap, rape and murder of Everard, the investigation was reopened. He was arrested and questioned in relation to the report in March 2022.	No further action due to the alleged offence not meeting the evidential threshold for charging
Between 22 January and 1 February	2021	Indecent exposure (s66 Sexual Offences Act 2003)	Couzens allegedly indecently exposed himself on two separate occasions in Kent, whilst at a drive-through of a restaurant. Information about these offences emerged after Couzens was investigated for two other reports of indecent exposures in mid to late February 2021 in Kent.	Pleaded not guilty to both charges, with the alleged offences ordered to 'lie on the file'
Between 30 January and 6 February	2021	Indecent exposure (s66 Sexual Offences Act 2003)	Couzens allegedly indecently exposed himself on two separate occasions in Kent, whilst at a drive-through of a restaurant. Information about these offences emerged after Couzens was investigated for two other reports of indecent exposures in mid to late February 2021 in Kent.	Pleaded not guilty to both charges, with the alleged offences ordered to 'lie on the file'
14 February	2021	Indecent exposure (s66 Sexual Offences Act 2003)	Couzens indecently exposed himself on two separate occasions at a drive-through of a McDonald's restaurant in Swanley, Kent. One of the victims at the restaurant described how Couzens had exposed his erect penis to her as she turned around to hand him food he had ordered at the window of the drive-through. She described how she burst into tears. Later that month, the incidents were reported and Couzens was identified as a suspect, with Couzens having used his bank card and driving his own car at the time of the offence. However, no further action was taken relating to investigating the incidents until after Couzens was arrested for the abduction, rape and murder of Everard. Having been interviewed in prison, Couzens was charged with the offences in March 2022.	Pleaded guilty and was sentenced to six-months-imprisonment for both incidents in March 2023
27 February	2021	Indecent exposure (s66 Sexual Offences Act 2003)		Pleaded guilty and was sentenced to six-months-imprisonment for both incidents in March 2023
March	2021	Kidnap (Common Law) Rape (s1 Sexual Offences Act 2003) Murder (Common Law)	On the evening of 3 March 2021, Everard was kidnapped in South London, England. Couzens identified himself as a police officer, handcuffing her, and placed her in his car before driving her to near Dover where he raped and strangled her, before burning her body and disposing of her remains in a nearby pond.	On 30 September, Couzens was sentenced to life imprisonment with a tariff of a whole life order, with Lord Justice Fulford justifying the severity of the punishment by saying that Couzens's use of his position as a police officer to detain Everard was the "vital factor which in my view makes the seriousness of this case exceptionally high".
2022		Possession of indecent images of children (s52A Criminal Justice Act 1988)	Couzens' electronic devices were seized when he was arrested for offences related to Everard. In 2022, a final review of material on the devices located 19 indecent images on his devices. In a prepared statement during an interview at HM Prison Belmarsh, Couzens provided a prepared statement, denying having ever downloaded or viewed indecent images of children.	No charges due to insufficient evidence

=== Recommendations ===
Part 1 of the inquiry provided the following recommendations:

No.	Overview	Details	Involved parties	Due date
1	Approach to investigating indecent exposure	At the earliest opportunity, and by September 2024 at the latest, police forces should ensure that they have a specialist policy on investigating all sexual offences, including so-called ‘non-contact’ offences, such as indecent exposure.	All police forces	Earliest opportunity (by September 2024)
2	Guidance and training on indecent exposure	By December 2024, the College of Policing, in collaboration with the National Police Chiefs’ Council, should improve guidance and training on indecent exposure, in order to improve the quality of investigations and management of indecent exposure cases. In particular, the College of Policing should: - review and update training, informed by crime statistics and research into the nature of indecent exposure and its impact on victims; review and update the guidance for police officers to improve the handling of indecent exposure cases; - include guidance on appropriate resourcing for investigations; and - ensure that guidance and training reflect the Sentencing Council guidelines, which recognise factors indicating increased harm and culpability. This activity should be informed by the results of Recommendation 4 below	College of Policing; National Police Chiefs' Council	December 2024
3	Treatment of masturbatory indecent exposure within the criminal justice system	With immediate effect, the Home Office, Ministry of Justice, College of Policing and National Police Chiefs’ Council should work together to conduct a fundamental review of the way masturbatory indecent exposure is treated within the criminal justice system. The review should focus on: recognising the seriousness of the offence; identifying it as an indicator of disinhibition by perpetrators; and understanding and addressing the wider issue of sexual precursor conduct so as to prevent victimisation, improve the response to victims when it occurs and bring more offenders to justice.	Home Office; Ministry of Justice; College of Policing; National Police Chiefs' Council	Immediate effect
4	Research into masturbatory indecent exposure	With immediate effect, the Home Office, in collaboration with the College of Policing, should commission research to establish if there is an evidence-based link between active masturbatory indecent exposure and subsequent contact offending. Where relevant, findings should then be used to shape policy, training and guidance for police officers investigating indecent exposure cases (as per Recommendation 2).	Home Office; College of Policing	Immediate effect
5	Public information campaign on indecent exposure	By March 2025, the Home Office, together with the National Police Chiefs’ Council, should launch a public campaign to: raise awareness about the illegality/criminality and legal consequences of any type of indecent exposure and boost the confidence of victims to report cases of indecent exposure to ensure that more offenders are brought to justice; and - increase publicity around the relevant legislation in order to encourage reporting of unsolicited photographs sent of genitals with the intention to cause harm, distress or humiliation and to discourage perpetrators from doing so.	Home Office; National Police Chiefs' Council	March 2025
6	Review of indecent exposure allegations and other sexual offences recorded against serving police officers	By September 2024, the National Police Chiefs’ Council, in collaboration with all force vetting units, and building on the results of the recent data-washing exercise, should conduct a review of the circumstances of all allegations of indecent exposure and other sexual offences recorded on the Police National Database and the Police National Computer against serving officers. This is to identify, investigate and ultimately remove those officers found to have committed sexual offences from all police forces.	National Police Chiefs' Council; Individual police force vetting units	September 2024
7	In-person interviews and home visits	With immediate effect, the College of Policing, in collaboration with force recruitment, should ensure that every new candidate applying to become a police officer in any police force undergoes an in-person interview and home visit. This should be designed to provide a holistic picture of the candidate and a better understanding of the candidate's motivations for joining the police and their dedication to serving the public. In particular, this should include the following: An in-person interview with the candidate to ensure that face-to-face contact is made with the recruiting force before the vetting or onboarding of the candidate is progressed. - A visit to the residence of all new candidates. This should be used as another opportunity, in advance of vetting enquiries, to engage with the candidate, relevant family members or other occupants of the residence, wherever possible. - An integrity questionnaire, used as part of the in-person home visit, to explore fully the candidate's personal attitudes and values, including increased scrutiny of the candidate's motivations and suitability for joining the police. - Corresponding guidance and training for home visits must be developed to ensure that the visits will enable a better sense of the candidate's character, rather than judge living arrangements or socio-economic status.	College of Policing; All police force's recruitment teams	Immediate effect
8	Recruitment and vetting policy, processes and practices	By June 2024, the College of Policing, in collaboration with force vetting units, should take further steps to prevent those unsuitable for policing from joining the policing profession. This should include further developing the Vetting Code of Practice, Authorised Professional Practice on Vetting, and other guidance on recruitment and vetting practices in order to prevent those who commit sexually motivated crimes against women and those otherwise unsuitable for policing from holding the office of constable. In particular, recruitment and vetting policy, processes and practices must be developed in the following areas: Applicants should be required to undergo an assessment of their psychological suitability for the role (which is not just a questionnaire). - There should be more robust use of the Police National Database during vetting, including as a tool to reveal unreported adverse information about applicants to ensure that potential risks are not missed. In particular, the Database should be used when individuals attempt to move between forces. - Any individual identified as having a conviction or caution for a sexual offence should be rejected during police vetting. This should be clearly outlined in the Vetting Code of Practice and reflected in the Authorised Professional Practice on Vetting, which should consider all contact and non-contact sexual offences. - The Authorised Professional Practice on Vetting should be amended to make it clear that military and/or Ministry of Defence checks should be carried out on all applicants who have served as military reservists. - There should be a fundamental review of the link between debt, mental health, vulnerability to corruption and suitability to be a police officer, to inform vetting decisions. Detailed consideration should be given to the amount of unsecured personal debt held by officers, and rules should be amended to mandate officers to report any significant changes in debt to vetting teams. In addition, the rules should require applicants and officers to provide further insight into their finances, including any payday loans, when requested during the vetting process. - There should be increased rigour in relation to checks for authorised firearms officers, to ensure that vetting standards are met, as well as the introduction of a psychological assessment and an appropriate process for seeking feedback from supervisors or line managers to determine suitability for the role. - No police officer should be onboarded, even if only for initial training, before all vetting is complete. In addition, each officer's force vetting should be completed before their National Security Vetting is initiated. All force vetting information should be passed to National Security Vetting officers for consideration.	College of Policing; Individual police force's vetting units	June 2024
9	Professional rigour in decision-making	By March 2025, the College of Policing, in collaboration with force vetting units, should take steps to improve the quality and consistency of police vetting decision-making. This should include encouraging the use of greater professional rigour and curiosity when investigating lines of enquiry, in order to prevent those who commit sexually motivated crimes against women and those otherwise unsuitable for policing from joining the policing profession. These steps should include the following: Recruiting forces should be able to request that unresolved allegations discovered during vetting processes be reinvestigated. - In collaboration with the National Police Chiefs’ Council, a national vetting capability should be created, as an advisory function, to provide another layer of confidence in instances where complex vetting investigations and decisions are required. In such cases, forces should approach the national vetting function to seek proposed lines of enquiry and ensure that they are following an agreed, standardised approach when considering complex cases. - Consideration should be given during vetting to any information or intelligence about police officers being reported missing, regardless of how quickly such reports were closed. - Forces must ensure that force vetting units are complying with and practising Section 6.2 of the College of Policing Authorised Professional Practice on Vetting (2021), which states that force vetting units “must record the results of vetting enquiries; the rationale for refusing, suspending, withdrawing or granting clearance, including with restrictions; and where adverse information has been revealed and considered”. This is to ensure that an audit trail is recorded to give the force confidence in decisions made at the time and to allow future vetting officers to constructively scrutinise vetting enquiries and outcomes.	College of Policing; Individual police force's vetting units; National Police Chiefs' Council	March 2025
10	Vetting Code of Practice and transfers	With immediate effect, all recruiting forces should have regard to the new Vetting Code of Practice, which requires the parent force to provide all relevant information requested about the transferee to enable an effective assessment of risk by the force conducting a full re-vet of the transferee.	Individual police force's recruitment teams	Immediate effect
11	Information-sharing	By December 2024, the College of Policing, in collaboration with force vetting and recruitment units, should ensure that information-sharing practices, including data retention policies, are strengthened in order to prevent those who commit sexually motivated crimes against women and those otherwise unsuitable for policing from remaining in, or moving across, the policing profession. In particular, there should be a focus on the following information: Previous failures to achieve vetting should be recorded by all forces and flagged to recruiting forces. This should also trigger a re-vet with the current or recruiting force. - A shared agreement should be made about the quality, relevant and necessary content, and sources of information that will be provided in a reference for a future force, also known as a ‘shared referencing protocol’, with directed questions that must be answered (for example, regarding any past disciplinary or honesty/integrity issues). Information to be shared as part of the protocol should be covered within the relevant forces’ fair processing notices. The protocol should apply to all transfers and applications to police forces from individuals in the uniformed services, including: • the Ministry of Defence (including the Army, the Royal Air Force and the Royal Navy, as well as their respective reserve forces); • fire and rescue services; • HM Prison and Probation Service; • other police forces; and • relevant government agencies, such as Border Force or Immigration Enforcement. This is to improve forces’ access to – and ability to use – the totality of information they hold about officers in order to prevent, detect and deal with those likely to commit offences. - As per Recommendation 8(b), there should be expanded access to and use of the Police National Database, including as a tool for revealing relevant uninvestigated adverse information about officers. d. Any adverse information or intelligence (developed or otherwise) should be passed by the current Professional Standards Directorate to the receiving Professional Standards Directorate for any officers transferring. No decisions on their appointment should be made until that intelligence has been reviewed, recorded and closed and the vetting units have had time to consider it. If the recruiting force identifies adverse information as a result of the vetting process, this should be shared with the current force for consideration and potential action.	College of Policing; Individual police force's vetting units; Individual police force's recruitment team	December 2024
12	Right to privacy	With immediate effect, police forces should convey to all existing and prospective officers and staff that they must be held to a higher standard of behaviour and accountability than members of the public, and that therefore their right to privacy can be fettered in certain circumstances. These circumstances include, but are not limited to: recruitment, vetting, aftercare, transfer, promotion, role change, returning to policing and maintaining standards. This is to ensure that members of the police are fully aware and accountable for the unique powers entrusted to them and the standards of professional behaviour they swear to uphold. Updated fair processing notices concerning changes to processing of personal data should be provided prior to any new processing taking place, including data-sharing.	Individual police forces	Immediate effect
13	Aftercare	By December 2024, the College of Policing, in collaboration with all force vetting units, should develop a stronger approach to force vetting aftercare in order to monitor an individual effectively throughout their career with the police and be aware of any change in circumstances as soon as possible to ensure that potential risks/red flags are identified and assessed. In particular, that approach should include the following: Mandatory, randomised re-vetting should be introduced, as an additional layer to standardised vetting periods, for police officers and staff, akin to randomised drug-testing. - In addition to police officers and staff being required to declare any material changes in their circumstances within a managed system, such as a human resources system, supervisors, or anyone with concerns relating to behaviour, welfare or performance, should report them to Professional Standards Departments at any point. - Professional Standards Departments should systematically exchange relevant and necessary information with vetting and counter-corruption units to consider information disclosed by any individual, and any action necessary.	College of Policing; Individual police force's vetting units	December 2024
14	Positive culture and elimination of misconduct or criminality often excused as ‘banter’	With immediate effect, every police force should commit publicly to being an antisexist, anti-misogynistic, anti-racist organisation in order to address, understand and eradicate sexism, racism and misogyny, contributing to a wider positive culture to remove all forms of discrimination from the profession. This includes properly addressing – and taking steps to root out – so-called ‘banter’ that often veils or excuses malign or toxic behaviour in police ranks.	Individual police forces	Immediate effect
15	Reporting by police officers and staff of harassment, sexual offences and inappropriate behaviour committed by fellow officers	With immediate effect, all police forces should take action to understand and confront the barriers that police officers and staff face when reporting sexual offences committed by a person that they work with or in the workplace. This is in order to encourage victims, who are also police officers or police staff, to come forward and submit complaints, as well as to identify and remove those who are not fit for service. To do this, forces should: ensure, when a complaint is made, that sufficient and appropriate resources are dedicated to supporting the complainant, including maintaining anonymity where needed or requested, and ensuring an investigation is carried out as appropriate; - address cultural barriers to reporting, such as re-victimising complainants by labelling or treating them as ‘troublemakers’; and - provide dedicated reporting processes for women in police forces who experience inappropriate behaviour related to their gender.	Individual police forces	Immediate effect
16	Recruitment and retention of women in police forces	By September 2024, the College of Policing and the National Police Chiefs’ Council should review and examine the conditions of female officers and staff in order to encourage more women to join the police and progress in policing careers. To ensure success, this should include a review of: a. working conditions that do not address the realities of modern working lives, including families where both parents are officers and share caring responsibilities; b. processes, training and refreshers for officers returning from parental leave; and c. kit, equipment and facilities designed largely by and for men.	College of Policing; National Police Chiefs' Council	September 2024

=== Conclusions ===
No.	Details
1	Wayne Couzens deliberately targeted his victims and, in some cases, his behaviour made them question their own responsibility for what happened, deterring them from reporting his behaviour to an appropriate authority.
2	An increase in the frequency of sexual offending can be deadly serious and needs to be treated as such.
3	There was a lamentable and repeated failure to deal, in a reasonable and professional manner, with the several allegations reported to different police forces by a number of people prior to Sarah Everard's murder.
4	The actions of the investigating officer in the June 2015 case [Couzens exposing himself] fell far short of what would be expected of a competent police constable.
5	The officer in the June 2015 case placed far too little emphasis on the quality of the information provided by the informant.
6	The officer in the June 2015 case gave too much weight to untested and subjective opinions about the informant's reliability, as well as to a possible mistake the informant may have made in describing a feature of the incident.
7	The failure to investigate the June 2015 indecent exposure report was a red flag and a missed opportunity to disrupt or prevent Wayne Couzens’ offending and allowed him to continue working as a police officer.
8	The officer in the case for the 2021 drive-through indecent exposure offences also placed too little emphasis on the quality of the information provided by the informant.
9	Rather than providing an excuse for inaction, unanswered questions about a case should spur an investigator to look for further evidence to prove the matter either way.
10	The investigation of the 2021 drive-through offences was poor and slow, demonstrating a complete lack of investigative curiosity.
11	It is unlikely that Wayne Couzens’ crimes against Sarah Everard could have been disrupted following the report of the drive-through offences on 28 February 2021.
12	The three lethargic and inadequate investigations into the allegations of indecent exposure against Wayne Couzens suggest the officers in the cases found reasons not to pursue the criminal investigation rather than build a successful case for prosecution.
13	The term ‘flashing’, used in the now obsolete College of Policing guidance, conveyed nothing of the victim's experience and may have downplayed the seriousness of the offender's behaviour.
14	The example of indecent exposure used in the now obsolete College of Policing guidance is inadequate. This example has informed a whole national cohort of officers who are currently responsible for investigating indecent exposure cases.
15	The Inquiry is extremely concerned that current national guidance for police forces on investigating sexual offences does not appear to cover indecent exposure, which may support a view that indecent exposure is not a serious offence.
16	It is inappropriate and unethical that any victim of crime should be further victimised by being the recipient of unwanted attention from reporters following court proceedings.
17	The Inquiry has serious concerns about treating indecent exposure as a low-level offence within policing.
18	Reported cases of indecent exposure must be thoroughly and comprehensively investigated. Victims also need to be encouraged to report.
19	The purchases of garments made by Wayne Couzens via an online marketplace were sexually motivated and intended for the purpose of his sexual gratification [on at least 11 occasions, Couzens requested female sellers to 'cum' into the items, negotiating increased prices for them to do so].
20	Evidence seen by the Inquiry that Wayne Couzens allegedly sent an unsolicited photograph of his erect penis to an online seller provides further potential evidence of his willingness to indecently expose himself.
21	The evidence of a historical allegation of very serious sexual assault suggests that Wayne Couzens’ offending in 2021 was not an isolated incident but may have been part of a pattern of offending dating back many years.
22	Wayne Couzens being reported as a missing person in 2013 was a red flag about his suitability to be a police officer.
23	Wayne Couzens, at times, sought to deliberately mask his financial situation to increase his chances of being recruited to various police forces. There were additional failings on the part of some of those involved in his recruitment and vetting.
24	Home visits are an important part of the application process and should be used for all police recruitment.
25	At Kent Police, the same vetting policy appears to have been applied in different years by different teams with different results. There was also an element of discretion exercised by the force vetting staff even where the guidance itself was quite prescriptive.
26	Wayne Couzens remained a special constable with Kent Police despite having failed vetting to be a regular officer in the same force.
27	Wayne Couzens did not provide Thames Valley Police with all of the financial information requested by them for his force vetting for the Civil Nuclear Constabulary.
28	Red flags about Wayne Couzens’ history of financial difficulties and that he was a Russian speaker were not given proper consideration when he applied to join the Civil Nuclear Constabulary.
29	Thames Valley Police made the correct recommendation to the Civil Nuclear Constabulary, namely that Wayne Couzens should be refused force vetting clearance because he appeared to have a current Individual Voluntary Arrangement where a portion of his debt had been written off. However, the rationale given for the recommendation suggested that the Thames Valley Police Central Vetting Unit may not have properly understood the relevant guidance.
30	The Civil Nuclear Constabulary's decision to put Wayne Couzens forward for National Security Vetting before receiving a recommendation about his force vetting clearance enabled him to evade proper scrutiny of his finances through the lens of police force vetting.
31	The Civil Nuclear Constabulary made its decision to grant force vetting clearance to Wayne Couzens on the basis of limited and incomplete information and consequently missed red flags.
32	Owing to a principle of vetting confidentiality, the Civil Nuclear Constabulary did not have sight of the material generated by the National Security Vetting process when deciding to employ Wayne Couzens.
33	The Inquiry is satisfied that, when the Civil Nuclear Constabulary put Wayne Couzens forward, via the Office for Civil Nuclear Security, for Developed Vetting clearance, both organisations were aware that there were some financial issues in his background.
34	The Office for Civil Nuclear Security made the decision to grant Wayne Couzens Developed Vetting clearance without considering the available information from police vetting, including the recommendation from Thames Valley Police that he should be refused force vetting clearance.
35	The potential risks identified at the time Wayne Couzens was undergoing National Security Vetting related to his finances.
36	The Civil Nuclear Constabulary used the National Security Vetting process inappropriately as part of a wider assessment of Wayne Couzens’ suitability to carry a firearm.
37	The Civil Nuclear Constabulary downgraded Wayne Couzens’ National Security Vetting clearance level in 2017 but re-vetting was not required. At that time the Civil Nuclear Constabulary remained unsighted on the Police National Database entry in relation to the 2015 allegation of indecent exposure.
38	Even if a full National Security Vetting renewal had been undertaken, it is unlikely that the 2015 allegation would have surfaced because, while United Kingdom Security Vetting had access to the Police National Computer (which contains information about recorded criminality), it did not have access to the Police National Database (which contains intelligence about an individual). This is a significant gap.
39	The Metropolitan Police Service conflated two separate disclosures relating to his debt when reconsidering, after his arrest for the abduction, rape and murder of Sarah Everard, Wayne Couzens’ vetting process for the Civil Nuclear Constabulary. This meant that the vetting review report incorrectly narrated the extent of Wayne Couzens’ debt and financial difficulties.
40	The Inquiry found a lack of attention to detail in the Metropolitan Police Service’s internal review report.
41	The Inquiry questions why the Metropolitan Police Service vetting officer did not ask the Civil Nuclear Constabulary about the unintentional TASER discharge incident.
42	Due to the passage of time, the Metropolitan Police Service cannot now confirm whether the intelligence about the 2015 indecent exposure allegation involving Wayne Couzens was not identified because the correct checks were not carried out, or was identified but not considered during his original vetting in 2018.
43	The Police National Database entry about the 2015 indecent exposure allegation was considered and discounted by the senior vetting officer, who indicated that vetting clearance would still have been recommended. The Inquiry has not seen the tasking instructions to the senior vetting officer to clarify what was required in the retrospective assessment, but the recorded rationale for how the Police National Database entry had been considered during the re-vet process did not include any explanation of why the information had been discounted. This is a deeply significant failing.
44	Recruiting forces are at risk if previous allegations of crime involving prospective transferees are not properly investigated at the time and incomplete information is therefore potentially provided to the employing force.
45	In cases where allegations are made but not investigated properly, vetting officers cannot commission further enquiries. This is a vulnerability in vetting procedures.
46	The Metropolitan Police Service's willingness to accept a decision that an uninvestigated allegation of indecent exposure did not warrant further exploration during the vetting process is of serious concern to the Inquiry
47	Wayne Couzens’ accidental TASER discharge was not a missed opportunity to prevent his further offending.
48	To assess suitability to work as an authorised firearms officer, careful and proactive supervision is required, rather than a reliance on self-disclosure by officers about financial issues.
49	The risk assessment carried out on Wayne Couzens by the Metropolitan Police Service when determining his suitability to be authorised to carry a firearm should have been more robust and not reliant on the vetting process.
50	The Metropolitan Police Service did not carry out a formal psychological assessment of Wayne Couzens’ suitability to be an authorised firearms officer. This was in accordance with policy at the time.
51	The opportunities to earn overtime in the Parliamentary and Diplomatic Protection Command may have disincentivised Wayne Couzens from seeking support for his welfare.
52	Sergeants supervising Wayne Couzens as an authorised firearms officer were not trained to assess an officer's state of mind or offer welfare support.
53	Wayne Couzens’ suitability assessment to become an authorised firearms officer at the Metropolitan Police Service may have been less rigorous than if he had applied for a firearms licence as a member of the public.
54	The Metropolitan Police Service did not receive or request an independent assessment of Wayne Couzens’ suitability to be an authorised firearms officer by someone within the force who had substantial experience of working with him.
55	Those assessing Wayne Couzens’ risk to be authorised as a firearms officer were not able to access information about the 2015 indecent exposure allegation. If they had, it is likely his application to be an authorised firearms officer would have been rejected.
56	Gaps in the way information is recorded and shared meant red flags about Wayne Couzens’ unsuitability to join the Parliamentary and Diplomatic Protection Command were missed.
57	Wayne Couzens’ spending was often excessive and impulsive, and he used loans and credit cards to manage his debt.
58	Wayne Couzens’ financial difficulties started well before he joined the police.
59	If more information about the particulars of Wayne Couzens’ Individual Voluntary Arrangement had been made available by him during the vetting process for the Civil Nuclear Constabulary, it is likely to have reinforced the assessment of an individual who was vulnerable financially.
60	It is likely that Wayne Couzens entered into the 2007 Individual Voluntary Arrangement in order to increase his chances of passing force vetting. It is also likely that he was unaware of the relevant vetting guidance stipulating that an Individual Voluntary Arrangement should have been a barrier to clearance.
61	Wayne Couzens may have consciously chosen an Individual Voluntary Arrangement over bankruptcy as a way of demonstrating that he was taking a responsible attitude to his debts, and because he believed that bankruptcy would preclude him from employment with the police.
62	Wayne Couzens engaged in deliberate deception to ensure that he passed the financial checks that were a part of the application and vetting process at the Metropolitan Police Service.
63	Two errors were made by Shared Services Connected Ltd when calculating Wayne Couzens’ salary, resulting in him being paid significantly more than he should have been by the Metropolitan Police Service.
64	The fact that errors in Wayne Couzens’ pay were not discovered earlier may have been due to a lack of oversight and governance controls.
65	Wayne Couzens appears to have been under unprecedented financial pressure at the time of the abduction, rape and murder of Sarah Everard.
66	At key moments of scrutiny, Wayne Couzens was able to present with a ‘veneer of solvency’. It is a matter of concern that the vetting and aftercare process did not reveal the longevity or extent of his indebtedness.
67	Financial difficulties can create a risk to mental health, which may affect individuals’ ability to perform their professional duties. This risk was not explicitly considered during Wayne Couzens’ vetting.
68	Police officers’ perceptions of the Parliamentary and Diplomatic Protection Command varied and were informed by their personal experience.
69	By the time Wayne Couzens resigned from Kent Special Constabulary, he already had a history of abusive and potentially criminal sexual activity against women.
70	There is insufficient evidence to draw broad conclusions about the culture at the Civil Nuclear Constabulary when Wayne Couzens worked there. Couzens’ contributions to the WhatsApp group with other former Civil Nuclear Constabulary officers provided an indication of an unhealthy culture between those officers, in which they felt comfortable sharing obscene, derogatory and discriminatory comments of an extreme nature.
71	Wayne Couzens was selective about when and to whom he revealed views and opinions that were at odds with the Code of Ethics and which fell below the high standards of professional behaviour expected of those who serve in the police.
72	The contributions of Wayne Couzens’ colleagues to the WhatsApp group that featured in the Independent Office for Police Conduct’s investigation, known as Operation Argens, amounted to serious offences, and some resulted in prison sentences.
73	One of Wayne Couzens’ comments to colleagues in the WhatsApp group is not only grossly offensive but also, viewed in the light of his later crimes, chilling.
74	Wayne Couzens was abusing women long before he joined the police and is likely to have victimised more women than have reported such allegations against him.
75	Although Wayne Couzens was not wholly a product of his working environments, those environments did nothing to discourage his misogynistic view of women and meant that, as long as he presented himself as professional, his deviant behaviour outside of work could flourish.

=== Part 2 ===
The publication of the findings of Part 1 of the inquiry were delayed until criminal and misconduct proceedings related to the Couzens had concluded. In response, in July 2022, the then Home Secretary stressed that the work of the inquiry should progress and Part 2 proceed as soon as practically possible given its importance in giving the public confidence that the police are there to protect them.

In May 2023, the terms of reference for Part 2 of the inquiry were set to focus on whether there is a risk of recurrence of the issues from Part 1 across policing as well as "recruitment and vetting of police officers, culture and standards in policing, and measures to help prevent sexually motivated violence against women in public spaces."

The first report of Part 2 was published in December 2025 and addresses the extent to which existing measures prevent sexually motivated crimes against women in public spaces (paragraph 3 of the terms of reference for Part 2). The report provides an update on the recommendations made in the Part 1 Report and makes a further 13 recommendations. The report noted that the inquiry expects to make further recommendations in subsequent reports.

=== Recommendations ===
Part 2 of the inquiry has provided the following recommendations in the first report:

No.	Overview	Details	Involved parties	Due date
17	Collection and sharing of data at national and local levels	Immediately, the Home Office should lead work, coordinated by the National Centre for Violence Against Women and Girls and Public Protection, to significantly increase both the collection and use of data on sexually motivated crimes against women in public spaces, in order to establish an informed understanding of these crimes and assist in building effective preventative measures. This work should: 1. Add requirements for police forces to consistently record and provide data on: (i) the nature of the relationship between the perpetrator and victim (i.e. whether they are strangers, or known to each other); and (ii) a description of the location of the offence(s) (by way of defined categories of public spaces or private premises), as part of their annual data returns. Consideration should be given to how this data can usefully inform the work of the Safer Streets mission to improve and better target prevention activity.; 2. Review the capability and capacity of police analysts, working to increase the recruitment, retention and recognition of the central role these professionals play in helping to prevent sexually motivated crimes against women in public spaces.; 3. Establish annual information collection, using existing surveys, to understand women’s perceptions of safety and their experiences and the public’s perception of sexually motivated crimes in public settings. Consideration should be given to how this data can usefully inform the work of the Safer Streets mission to improve and better target prevention activity.; 4. Set clear guidelines that, where data is gathered by policing from female victims of sexually motivated crimes in public spaces, they should be offered the opportunity to share information regarding protected characteristics. This is to ensure that, where possible, an accurate picture of victimisation is provided, and the correct support is available. Guidelines should cover details of how to conduct this data collection in a way that is sensitive to the needs of victims.	Home Office; National Centre for Violence Against Women and Girls and Public Protection; All police forces	Immediately
18	Increased use of police Designing Out Crime Officers in the prevention of sexually motivated crimes against women in public spaces	By November 2026, the Government should explore how to improve the impact that the safety advice provided by police Designing Out Crime Officers could have on the prevention of sexually motivated crimes in public spaces, including by amendments to policies and changing their status within relevant planning legislation.	Home Office; All police forces	November 2026
19	Targeted and consistent public messaging	By March 2026, the Home Office, as the lead department for the response to violence against women and girls, should agree funding for a multi-year series of public information campaigns centred around the prevention of sexually motivated crimes against women in public spaces. These campaigns should be managed and funded centrally by the UK Government, but rolled out regionally and locally in a sustainable and consistent way. They should all have the same central purpose and messaging, and include evaluation metrics based on behaviour and attitudinal change, as well as communications reach and engagement. This recommendation should not be seen to supersede any progress made against Recommendation 5 from the Part 1 Report (the Home Office should launch a public information campaign on indecent exposure). Instead, any activity to implement Recommendation 5 from the Part 1 Report should seek to incorporate any relevant learning from this, subsequent, recommendation as part of the response (despite the passage of time and nine-month delay in implementation).	Home Office	March 2026
20	Empowering and engaging citizens to take action	The public has a pivotal role to play in the prevention of sexually motivated crimes against women in public spaces. In recognition of that: 1. By April 2026, the Home Office, as the lead department for the response to violence against women and girls, should agree funding for (and later implement) a multi-year series of active bystander public information campaigns centred around the prevention of sexually motivated crimes against women in public spaces. Campaigns should be launched by no later than December 2026. These should be managed and funded centrally by the UK Government, but rolled out regionally and locally in a sustainable and consistent way. They should all have the same central purpose and messaging, and include evaluation metrics based on behaviour and attitudinal change, as well as communications reach and engagement.; 2. By July 2026, the Home Office should agree which agencies should have ownership of the coordination standards and messaging around active bystander training.; 3. By July 2026, the Government should consider the arguments for the introduction of a wider Good Samaritan law, as is being championed by Farah Naz, Zara Aleena’s aunt and campaigner; and in particular consider the potential impact that introducing such a law could have on the prevention of sexually motivated crimes against women in public spaces.	Home Office	April 2026 for funding active bystander public information campaigns; July 2026 for agreeing ownership of the coordination standards and messaging of campaigns; July 2026 for considering the arguments for introducing a wider Good Samaritan law
21	National roll-out of Project Vigilant	By April 2026, the Home Office, the National Centre for Violence Against Women and Girls and Public Protection, and the National Police Chiefs’ Council should roll out Project Vigilant nationally and consistently across all forces in England and Wales. This should be introduced primarily across nighttime economy spaces but should then be expanded to other suitable environments in which Project Vigilant could help prevent and interrupt perpetrators of sexually motivated crimes against women in public spaces. In addition, Police and Crime Commissioners should specifically liaise with Chief Constables on the implementation of Project Vigilant in their areas, to understand its impact on the delivery of the force’s Police and Crime Plan, and its contribution to national policing capabilities aimed at tackling violence against women and girls.	Home Office; National Centre for Violence Against Women and Girls and Public Protection; National Police Chiefs' Council; Police and Crime Commissioners; All police forces	April 2026
22	Information and early intervention for men and boys to create a culture of positive masculinity	By September 2026, the Home Office (as the lead department for the response to violence against women and girls), working closely with the Department for Education, the Ministry of Justice, and the Department of Health and Social Care, should increase and improve the information, support and programmes available to men and boys that create a culture of positive masculinity, to help prevent them from committing sexually motivated crimes against women in public spaces. This work should include: 1. Implementing the recommendation from Creating a Safer World – The Challenge of Regulating Online Pornography (the 2025 Independent Pornography Review conducted by Baroness Bertin) that “resources and funding should be focused on school and community programmes specifically for boys and young men in order to encourage healthy discussions about positive masculinity and relationships, and to counter misogynistic culture”; 2. Creating a comprehensive and easy-to-access online space that provides support to intervene and prevent sexually motivated crimes against women in public spaces by providing information directly to perpetrators and their families; this could take a similar form to information available on the Enough website aimed at domestic abuse perpetrators, and should be designed in collaboration with specialist organisations who support perpetrators; 3. Increasing the availability of early interventions – available via GPs, self-referral, social workers – for individuals who have not yet committed a sexual offence but have concerns about their thoughts or behaviours, as well as the availability of interventions via probation officers where the individual is already within the criminal justice system; 4. Reviewing the availability, use and effectiveness of behaviour change programmes for these men and boys (whether self-referred, GP-referred or provided as part of a condition on a criminal justice order), with actions to increase the availability of these programmes as necessary.	Home Office; Department for Education; Ministry of Justice; Department of Health and Social Care	September 2026
23	Police prioritisation of the prevention of sexually motivated crimes against women in public spaces	Immediately, Chief Constables and Police and Crime Commissioners should ensure that the prevention of sexually motivated crimes against women in public spaces is an essential part of: (i) their violence against women and girls plans; and (ii) the Police and Crime Plans. This should include: 1. Circulating consistent and sustained leadership communications across the force, with Chief Constables and Police and Crime Commissioners making very clear the priority placed on these offences; 2. Senior officers reviewing and taking appropriate action on metrics around these crimes, as part of standard and regular force performance management; 3. Formal reviews by the senior officer team in every force to ensure that all relevant force functional areas have clear roles and responsibilities regarding the prevention of these crimes, with mechanisms in place to test officer and staff understanding; and 4. In addition to Recommendation 18 – increased use of police Designing Out Crime Officers in the prevention of sexually motivated crimes against women in public spaces – taking sustained action to train, empower and embed these roles in forces.	All police forces; Chief Constables; Police and Crime Commissioners	Immediately
24	Implementation of Operation Soteria	By March 2026, the Home Office, working with the National Police Chiefs’ Council, and the National Centre for Violence Against Women and Girls and Public Protection, should agree plans for the full, consistent and sustainable implementation of Operation Soteria across all forces in England and Wales. This should include agreement of multi-year funding, covering the period until Operation Soteria has been both fully implemented and evaluated in all forces, with any issues arising from each evaluation being addressed. In addition, Police and Crime Commissioners should specifically liaise with Chief Constables on the implementation of Operation Soteria in their areas, to understand its impact on the delivery of the force’s Police and Crime Plan, and its contribution to national policing capabilities aimed at tackling violence against women and girls.	Home Office; National Police Chiefs' Council; National Centre for Violence Against Women and Girls and Public Protection; All police forces; Police and Crime Commissioners; Chief Constables	March 2026
25	A truly whole-system approach to preventing sexually motivated crimes against women in public spaces	By June 2026, building on the wider violence against women and girls strategy, the Government should publish a comprehensive, multi-year and whole-system prevention strategy, which specifically targets the perpetrators of sexually motivated crimes against women in public spaces. This strategy should: 1. Coordinate activity and measures aimed at: (i) preventing these crimes happening in the first place; and (ii) reducing the risk of perpetrators reoffending; 2. Coordinate and direct work to encourage reporting of these crimes; 3. Be based on: (i) a clear expectation of how and why the planned actions aim to contribute to prevention of crimes (informed by the research commissioned under Recommendation 17; and (ii) comprehensive and meaningful engagement with stakeholders, including charity and voluntary sector groups who represent victims and perpetrators; 4. Adopt a public health approach, with prevention activity across primary, secondary and tertiary levels; 5. Provide absolute clarity on the roles and responsibilities of essential and accountable sectors, agencies and departments to help avoid duplication in efforts and strengthen joint working – this should include: (i) following liaison with the National Police Chiefs’ Council, clarity on the extent of the role of policing in primary prevention (i.e. tackling the underlying roots of violence against women and girls); and (ii) where appropriate, introducing statutory duties where this is assessed as most needed; 6. Have secure multi-year funding, aligning with at least the ten-year period specified for halving violence against women and girls; and g. include the establishment of a robust evaluation mechanism – in order to measure the success of the prevention strategy – which should be aligned with the recommendations of the Home Affairs Committee’s 2025 report Tackling Violence Against Women and Girls: Funding and include a set of common metrics to allow for assessment of activity across all levels, and to measure progress.; If an assessment is made that new statutory duties or obligations are required to support the implementation of this prevention strategy and avoid duplication in efforts and strengthen joint working, steps should be taken without delay to secure the introduction of the relevant legislation.	Home Office; National Police Chiefs' Council; All police forces	June 2026
26	Improved mechanism for converting a promising policing initiative from local to national practice.	By March 2026, the College of Policing, working with the National Police Chiefs’ Council including the Office of the Police Chief Scientific Adviser, the Home Office, HM Inspectorate of Constabulary and Fire & Rescue Services, and the National Centre for Violence Against Women and Girls and Public Protection, should ensure that there are improved mechanisms in place to identify, test and roll out promising initiatives designed to prevent sexually motivated crimes against women in public spaces. This should include: 1. Continuing to encourage local innovation, but with an improved, standard mechanism in place by which local innovations can be tested, rolled out and evaluated nationally, learning from Operation Soteria; and 2. Working with the Association of Police and Crime Commissioners on an approach that encourages Police and Crime Commissioners (and their successors) and mayoral offices to liaise with Chief Constables about the implementation of rolled out measures, the impact they can have on delivery of the forces’ Police and Crime Plans, and their contribution to national policing capabilities in prevention of violence against women and girls; this work should include obtaining an understanding of the rationale behind any decision not to implement any measure, and recording those reasons.	College of Policing; National Police Chiefs' Council including the Office of the Police Chief Scientific Adviser; Home Office; HM Inspectorate of Constabulary and Fire & Rescue Services; National Centre for Violence Against Women and Girls and Public Protection; All police forces; Association of Police and Crime Commissioners; Police and Crime Commissioners and mayoral offices; Chief Constables	March 2026
27	Perpetrator focus and interventions	Immediately, the Home Office, as the lead department for the response to violence against women and girls, in conjunction with the Ministry of Justice, the Department for Transport, and national and local policing organisations, should prioritise prevention activity targeting the perpetrators of sexually motivated crimes against women in public spaces. This should include the following actions: 1. Immediately, the Home Office commissioning research to draw together and analyse information on the perpetrators of sexually motivated crimes against women in public, in order to help target preventative activity. This should include analysis of: information from behaviour change programmes on perpetrators’ patterns of behaviour; their motivations for behaviour change; and what is most effective at preventing this behaviour; and; information from academic and operational knowledge produced by Project Vigilant, Operation Soteria, the Metropolitan Police Service’s Violence Against Women and Girls 100 (V100) programme and similar programmes of perpetrator-focused work.; 2. By November 2026, the College of Policing and, within it, the National Centre for Violence Against Women and Girls and Public Protection, in collaboration with the National Police Chiefs’ Council, should use this research to develop training and guidance on how to identify and target policing activity against potential perpetrators of sexually motivated crimes against women in public spaces. This should include an interventions toolkit for use in forces. The training and guidance should be rolled out to forces by April 2027. It should then be updated annually, based on priorities identified in the Violence Against Women and Girls Strategic Threat Risk Assessment (which the National Police Chiefs’ Council should update in light of the research in Recommendation 17).; 3. By December 2027, HM Inspectorate of Constabulary should complete an inspection of the implementation of the new training and guidance in Recommendation 17, and of the efficiency and effectiveness of forces in adopting a perpetrator focus. This should include assessment of how successfully forces are balancing this focus with an appropriate and effective response to victims.; 4. Immediately, and while acknowledging the fact that many sexual offences are never reported to the police, the Home Office should include, as a metric within its evaluation of the success of the Government’s commitment to halve violence against women and girls in ten years, the number of perpetrators of these crimes who are prevented from further sexual offending. As a minimum, this should include: the number of perpetrators who are (i) arrested; (ii) prosecuted; and (iii) convicted of these crimes; and in addition (iv) information on reoffending rates for these categories; and (v) data on the number of individuals interrupted through Project Vigilant patrols.	Home Office; Ministry of Justice; Department for Transport; College of Policing; National Centre for Violence Against Women and Girls and Public Protection; National Police Chiefs' Council including the Office of the Police Chief Scientific Adviser; Home Office; HM Inspectorate of Constabulary and Fire & Rescue Services; All police forces	Immediately for research on perpetrators of sexually motivated crimes against women in public; November 2026 for training and guidance on how to identify and target policing activity against potential perpetrators; December 2027 for HM Inspectorate of Constabulary inspection of new training and guidance; Immediately for the addition of the evaluation metric for the Government's commitment to halve violence against women and girls
28	Improvement of the investigation of sexually motivated crimes against women and girls in public spaces	By March 2026, the College of Policing and the National Centre for Violence Against Women and Girls and Public Protection, working with the National Police Chiefs’ Council and the Crown Prosecution Service, should create a consistent and clear standard for police investigations in this area, explicitly addressing the detection of predatory perpetrators. The Home Secretary should give consideration to using her powers under section 53A of the Police Act 1996, which enables her to issue regulations that mandate police forces to follow particular procedures and practices.	College of Policing; National Centre for Violence Against Women and Girls and Public Protection; National Police Chiefs' Council; Crown Prosecution Service; All police forces	March 2026
29	Government prioritisation of the prevention of sexually motivated crimes against women in public spaces	Immediately, the Government should take action to make it clearer that preventing sexually motivated offences against women in public is an essential part of tackling violence against women and girls. This should include the following: The Government should ensure that this Report, the detail of the violence against women and girls strategy, and the prevention strategy at Recommendation 25 (and the evaluation of its success, if available) are before the Secretary of State to inform her view on how to update future versions of the Strategic Policing Requirement. This is so that the Secretary of State can use this information to assess the level of importance and prominence to give to the threat of violence against women and girls (compared with the other identified national threats); and specifically to the prioritisation of the prevention of sexual offences against women in public spaces.; The Government should commit to and pursue a positive ambition that generally these crimes are preventable, not inevitable, with a clear focus on prevention being key to meeting the target of halving violence against women and girls over ten years.; The Government should ensure that there is a clear focus on identifying, responding to and preventing sexually motivated crimes against women in public spaces in the job descriptions, training and guidance for the remodelled neighbourhood policing roles.; The Government has, previously, provided an initial response to Creating a Safer World – The Challenge of Regulating Online Pornography, the 2025 Independent Pornography Review conducted by Baroness Bertin. This included recognising the need to act urgently to tackle the harms from illegal and harmful pornography online, and the link between attitudes and behaviours in the online and offline world. The Government also recognised that this is crucial in order to deliver the mission to halve violence against women and girls in ten years. It is deeply worrying that harmful content that would be illegal offline remains unrestrained online. Therefore, the Government should provide a full response to each of the recommendations in the Review by February 2026, to enable cross-cutting prevention activity alongside the recommendations in this Report.	Home Office	Immediately

=== Part 3 ===
Following the sentencing of former police officer, David Carrick, in February 2023 the Home Secretary expanded the inquiry with a terms of reference for a Part 3 to examine Carrick’s case. The terms of reference require the inquiry to look at Carrick's criminal behaviour and career, the decision-making around his police vetting, any issues relating to Carrick’s behaviour or conduct that were known or raised by his colleagues, his abuse of police powers and intimidation of witnesses, and the impact of police treatment on his victims.

The terms of reference were amended in March 2026 to expand the timeline from only allegations of criminal behaviour and/or misconduct to a wider timeline of all relevant aspects of Carrick's life prior to and during his career as a police officer, with reference to any evidence indicating the potential drivers and motivation for his offending. The amended terms of reference also added a new method for the inquiry of considering "existing psychological and/or psychiatric assessment(s), including that prepared for the criminal proceedings".
