= Equality and diversity =

Equality and diversity is a term used in the United Kingdom to define and champion equality, diversity and human rights as defining values of society. It promotes equality of opportunity for all, giving every individual the chance to achieve their potential, free from prejudice and discrimination.

Legislation requires public authorities to promote equality in everything that they do, also making sure that other organisations meet their legal duties to promote equality while also doing so themselves.

Under the Equality Act 2010 there are certain legal requirements under existing legislation to promote equality in the areas of nine protected characteristics. These are often collectively referred to as the general duties to promote equality.

As the independent advocate for equality and human rights in Britain, a Commission of Equality and Human Rights (EHRC) exists that aims to reduce inequality, eliminate discrimination, strengthen good relations between people and promote and protect human rights. EHRC has a duty to challenge prejudice and disadvantage and promote the importance of human rights, enforcing equality laws on age, disability, sex, gender reassignment, race, religion or belief and sexual orientation and encourage compliance with the Human Rights Act.

== Protection of characteristics ==
The below 'protected characteristics' are all taken into account when discussing what unlawful discrimination is, or where equality and diversity should be promoted, in those parts of the UK where the Equality Act 2010 applies (England, Wales, Scotland, and not Northern Ireland):

- age
- gender reassignment
- being married or in a civil partnership
- being pregnant or on maternity leave
- disability
- race including colour, nationality, ethnic or national origin
- religion or belief
- sex
- sexual orientation

— GOV.UK

This also extends to discrimination as a result of being associated with another person said to have such a characteristic, or as a result of complaining about discrimination, or supporting another discrimination proceeding.

For England and Wales, the Crown Prosecution Service and the police have an agreed definition of what a hate crime is:

Any criminal offence which is perceived by the victim or any other person, to be motivated by hostility or prejudice, based on a person's disability or perceived disability; race or perceived race; or religion or perceived religion; or sexual orientation or perceived sexual orientation or transgender identity or perceived transgender identity.

— Crown Prosecution Service

Consequently, incorrect perceptions of the offender at the time of the offence may also become relevant to the case.

== Public sector equality duty ==
The duty set out in section 149 of the Equality Act requires those public authorities which are subject to it to have due regard to three aims:

- to eliminate unlawful discrimination, harassment, victimisation and any other conduct prohibited under the Act,
- to advance equality of opportunity between people who share a protected characteristic and those who do not, and
- to foster good relations between those who share a protected characteristic and those who do not.

The Cabinet Office's Information Note 1/13, "Public Procurement and the Public Sector Equality Duty", noted that public authorities needed to have due regard to this duty when planning and undertaking procurement activities, stating in particular that when contracting out public functions, it would be usual to include contract conditions which specified how equality obligations and objectives were to be complied with.

=== Applications of 'due regard' ===
Public authorities are required to have due regard to the need to eliminate discrimination, advance equality of opportunity and foster good relations. In practice, this has meant that equality impacts must be considered before decisions are taken.

Courts and the Equality and Human Rights Commission have required public bodies to show due regard to the public sector equality duty in a number of cases. For example:

In 2014 in England, Sandwell Metropolitan Borough Council was found to have breached the duty when it introduced a council tax reduction scheme without obtaining evidence of its effect on victims of domestic violence, who would find it harder to meet the discount criteria (of having lived in the area for a longer period of time).

In 2019 in Wales, Caerphilly County Borough Council was held not to have complied with the duty when deciding to close Pontllanfraith Leisure Centre.

In 2020 in Scotland, South Ayrshire Council was found to have breached the duty when it decided to close the Kyle Adult Day Centre without a proper equality impact assessment.

In 2022 in England, the Court of Appeal held that the London Borough of Lambeth lawfully discharged the public sector equality duty when it made experimental traffic orders for low-traffic neighbourhoods.

In 2026, the High Court held that the planning inspector properly discharged the public sector equality duty in a Bridgend, Wales enforcement case brought by a disabled resident.

In 2021 in Scotland, the Scottish Legal Aid Board entered a long-term agreement with the Equality and Human Rights Commission after concerns about how the board assessed the impact of its policies on people with protected characteristics. In 2023, the EHRC said the board had improved its equality practices and met the terms of the agreement.

=== Local policy ===
Some local authorities use written policies to fulfil the duty to 'advance equality of opportunity' and the other parts of the general duties. Below are a small number of examples:

- England: Buckinghamshire Council says it wants all residents, regardless of background, to have access to "great life opportunities" and states that it gives greater consideration where a policy or function may have a substantial impact on "equality of opportunity".
- Wales: Bridgend County Borough Council's Strategic Equality Plan 2024–2028 says the council aims to "promot[e] opportunities for all", and that its objectives are intended to "advance equality" in employment, policy, procurement and service delivery.
- Scotland: The City of Edinburgh Council's Equality and Diversity Framework 2021–2025 says it sets out the council's ambitions to "advance equality and promote diversity", and that the framework responds to the public sector equality duty, including the requirement to advance equality of opportunity.

== See also ==
- Anti-racism
- Antisemitism
- Disability
- Equal pay for equal work
- Gender equality
- Gender inequality
- Human rights
- Mental health
- Multiculturalism
- Political correctness
- United Kingdom labour law
