= Elish Angiolini =

Scottish lawyer (born 1960)

Her Grace The Right Honourable Lady Elish Angiolini LT DBE KC FRSA FRSE
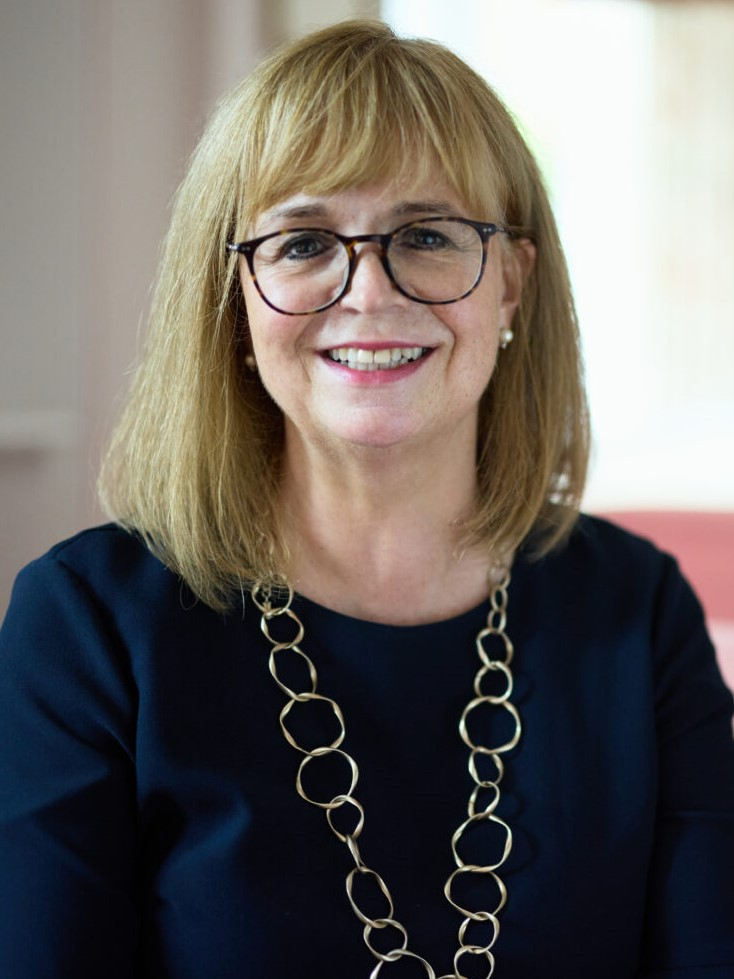
- Angiolini in 2021

Lord Clerk Register
- Incumbent
- Assumed office 5 June 2023
- Monarch: Charles III
- First Minister: Humza Yousaf; John Swinney
- Preceded by: The Baron Mackay of Clashfern

Principal of St Hugh's College, Oxford
- In office September 2012 – September 2025
- Preceded by: Sir Andrew Dilnot
- Succeeded by: Michele Acton

Lord Advocate
- In office 12 October 2006 – 30 April 2011
- Monarch: Elizabeth II
- First Minister: Jack McConnell; Alex Salmond
- Preceded by: Lord Boyd of Duncansby
- Succeeded by: Lord Mulholland

Solicitor General for Scotland
- In office 28 November 2001 – 12 October 2006
- Monarch: Elizabeth II
- First Minister: Jack McConnell
- Preceded by: Neil Davidson
- Succeeded by: John Beckett

Personal details
- Born: Elish Frances McPhilomy; 24 June 1960 (age 66) Govan, Glasgow, Scotland
- Spouse: Domenico Angiolini
- Children: 2
- Education: University of Strathclyde
- Profession: Lawyer

Lady Elish Frances Margaret Angiolini (née McPhilomy; born 24 June 1960) is a Scottish lawyer currently serving as Lord Clerk Register, the first woman to hold the role since its creation in the 13th century. She was appointed Lord High Commissioner to the General Assembly of the Church of Scotland, the British Monarch's representative to the Assembly, in 2025, succeeding Prince Edward, Duke of Edinburgh. Angiolini was a pro-vice chancellor of the University of Oxford from 2017 to 2025, and served as the Principal of St Hugh's College, Oxford, from 2012 to 2025; she was also a candidate in the 2024 University of Oxford Chancellor election. From 2011 until June 2022, she was styled as Dame Elish Angiolini.

She was the Lord Advocate of Scotland from 2006 until 2011, having previously been Solicitor General since 2001. She was the first woman, the first procurator fiscal, and the first solicitor to hold either post. Since leaving office she has led several investigations and inquiries, including a review of deaths in police custody commissioned by the then-Home Secretary Theresa May and the Angiolini Inquiry into the murder of Sarah Everard, which reported in February 2024.

From September 2012 to September 2025, Angiolini was the Principal of St Hugh's College, Oxford. She also served as a pro-vice-chancellor of the University of Oxford from 2017 to 2025, and is an Honorary Professor of the Chinese University of Hong Kong. She further served as Chancellor of the University of the West of Scotland from 2013 to 2021. In June 2022, she was appointed a Lady of the Order of the Thistle, the highest order of chivalry in Scotland, by Queen Elizabeth II. Angiolini took part in the Coronation of Charles III, representing the Order of the Thistle.

== Early life and education ==
Angiolini was born into a family of Irish Catholic descent on 24 June 1960, her parents being Mary (née Magill) and James McPhilomy. She grew up in Govan, Glasgow; her father was a coal merchant and later worked for Rolls-Royce and then as a commercial driver. As a child she wanted to be a ballet dancer. One of her first summer jobs was working on a checkout at Marks & Spencer. She was educated at Notre Dame High School for Girls in the West End of the city, and studied at the School of Law of the University of Strathclyde, obtaining an LL.B. (Hons) degree in 1982 and a Diploma in Legal Practice in 1983.

Angiolini's first encounter with the legal profession came when, as a teenager, she was asked to give evidence in a burglary trial. Later, she recalled: "I was not terribly impressed. There were a lot of important people in gowns and witnesses were left a very long time in the witness room and not given any information... All the attention was focused on the permanent figures of the court, while ... witnesses, and those in the dock, seemed irrelevant". The experience inspired Angiolini to pursue a career in law. Later, as Regional Procurator Fiscal, Angiolini piloted a victim liaison scheme which was subsequently extended throughout Scotland.

== Career ==
=== Early legal career ===
Upon completing her legal studies, she joined the Crown Office and Procurator Fiscal Service to train as a Procurator Fiscal (public prosecutor). Whilst a trainee, she survived the Polmont rail accident; two passengers sitting next to her were killed.

Following her training, Angiolini spent eight years as a Depute Procurator Fiscal in Airdrie, prosecuting in Airdrie Sheriff Court. In 1992, she was seconded to the Crown Office where she worked in the Lord Advocate's Secretariat. During her secondment, she developed an interest in improving the support offered to vulnerable victims and witnesses, and in particular to children. She was then appointed Senior Depute Procurator Fiscal at Glasgow, taking operational responsibility for Sheriff and Jury prosecutions. In 1995, she was promoted to Assistant Procurator Fiscal at Glasgow.

In 1997, Angiolini returned to the Crown Office as Head of Policy, with responsibility for the development of policy across all functions of the department. In particular, she helped the department prepare for devolution and was involved in the preparation of the Scotland Act 1998. At the same time, Angiolini was responsible for the department's preparations for the introduction of the Human Rights Act 1998.

She was then appointed Regional Procurator Fiscal for Grampian, Highland and Islands (based at Aberdeen) on 27 July 2000 – the first woman to hold such a post. In this role she piloted a victim liaison scheme which was subsequently extended across the country.

=== Solicitor General ===
Angiolini was appointed Solicitor General for Scotland by First Minister Jack McConnell in 2001. Angiolini was the first solicitor, as opposed to advocate, to be appointed Solicitor General; this was not received favourably amongst all members of the legal profession.

In 2006, McConnell praised Angiolini's work as Solicitor General, saying the decision to appoint her had been one of the best he had ever made.

=== Lord Advocate ===
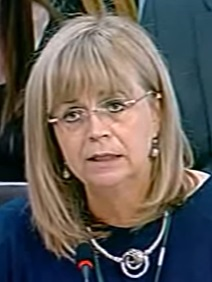
Angiolini before the Scottish Parliament Justice Committee, September 2015

Following the resignation of Lord Boyd, McConnell nominated Angiolini for the post of Lord Advocate. Her nomination was passed by Parliament on 5 October 2006, with 99 in favour, 0 against and 15 abstentions. She was sworn in at the Court of Session on 12 October 2006 and one month later she was made a member of the Privy Council.

Following the 2007 election, there was speculation that the new SNP administration might replace Angiolini. On the morning after the election, Angiolini had cleared her office and was preparing to leave when she received a phone call from Alex Salmond, the new First Minister. Angiolini congratulated Salmond on his election, and said that she had packed up her things. "Unpack your things, and come and see me", replied Salmond. Salmond decided that Angiolini should stay in post and would continue not to attend Cabinet except to provide advice or to make representations about her own department, as had been the case with the former administration following the departure of her predecessor. Her reappointment was agreed by Parliament on 24 May 2007. This made her the first Lord Advocate to serve two different governments.

Later in 2007, Angiolini clashed publicly with the head of Scotland's judiciary, Lord President Hamilton, over the collapse of the World's End murders trial. The trial judge, Lord Clarke, had ruled there was insufficient evidence for the jury to convict and threw the case out. Angiolini then made a statement to the Scottish Parliament, saying she was "disappointed" at the decision, a move Hamilton said undermined the independence of the judiciary.

Angiolini announced in October 2010 that she would step down from the role of Lord Advocate after the Scottish Parliament elections in May 2011.

Salmond paid tribute to Angiolini, saying "her term as Lord Advocate has been marked by significant improvements and substantial success in the disposal of justice in Scotland". She was succeeded on 19 May 2011 by Francis Mulholland.

=== Academic and charity work ===
On leaving the post of Lord Advocate, Angiolini was announced as the first patron of LawWorks Scotland, a charity which helps people who cannot afford legal advice. In September 2011, it was announced that Angiolini was to become a visiting professor at Strathclyde Law School, part of her old university. As well as teaching undergraduates, she was to develop a course in advocacy studies. Angiolini is a member of Terra Firma Chambers, stating particular interests in public administrative law and professional negligence.

Angiolini was headhunted by both the United Nations (to be a prosecutor to the International Criminal Court) and by the University of Oxford; in February 2012, it was announced that Angiolini would become Principal of St Hugh's College, Oxford in September that year, replacing Andrew Dilnot. In 2014, Angiolini opened the Dickson Poon University of Oxford China Centre alongside Prince William, after a total of £20 million had been gifted to St Hugh's in a fundraising campaign.

Angiolini replaced Robert Smith, Baron Smith of Kelvin as Chancellor of the University of the West of Scotland in September 2013 until 2021.

She was made a Pro-Vice-Chancellor of the University of Oxford in 2017.

In 2021, she was appointed chair of the charity Reprieve's board of trustees, succeeding Jim Wallace, Baron Wallace of Tankerness.

=== Later work and Lord Clerk Register ===
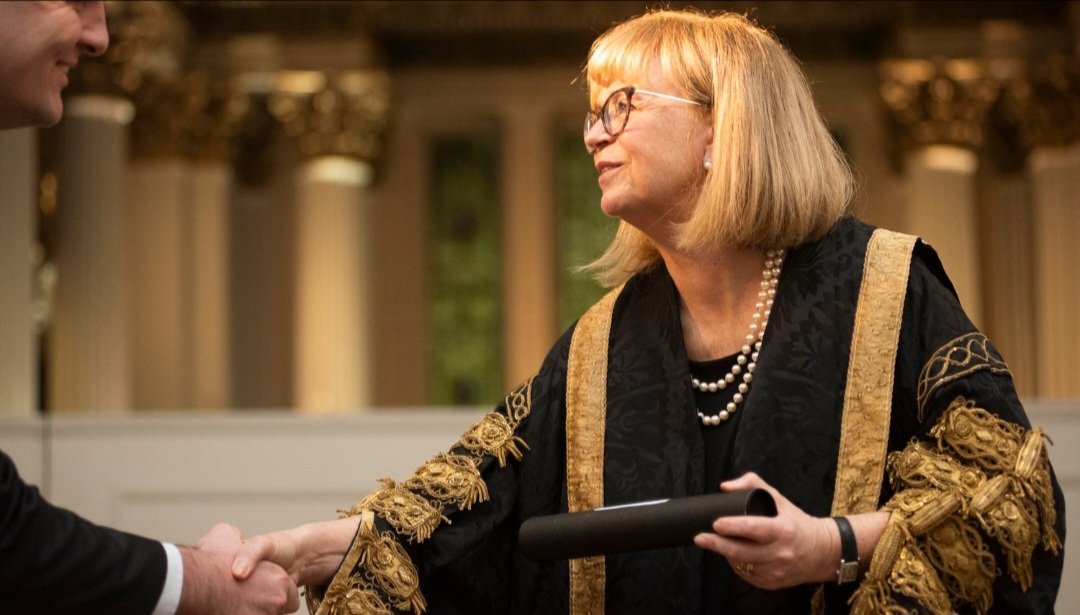
Lady Elish Angiolini as Lord Clerk Register, 2024

Angiolini led an "investigation into the disposal of baby ashes at Mortonhall Crematorium" in 2013, after it was revealed that the remains of babies were being cremated with unrelated adults. She was subsequently asked by the Scottish Government to carry out an investigation into the practices of all crematoria across Scotland. In 2015, her review on how the Crown Prosecution Service and Metropolitan Police Service investigate and prosecute rape cases in London was published.

Angiolini's report into deaths in custody in the UK, commissioned by the Home Office, was published at the end of October 2017. In 2018, she was appointed by the Scottish government to "review the processes for handling complaints against the police and investigating serious incidents and alleged misconduct."

Angiolini was appointed as the chair of an independent inquiry into the murder of Sarah Everard (the Angiolini Inquiry), and the report from the first phase of the inquiry was released in February 2024.

In 2023, she was appointed to the office of Lord Clerk Register.

== Honours ==
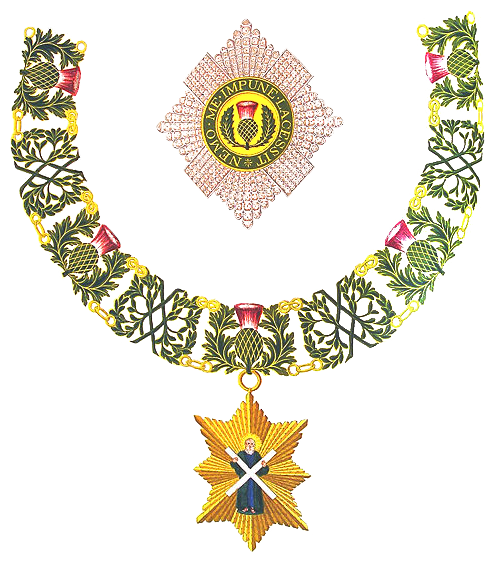
Insignia of the Order of the Thistle

In the 2011 Birthday Honours, she was appointed Dame Commander of the Order of the British Empire (DBE) for services to the administration of justice, and thereby granted the title dame.

On 10 June 2022, she was appointed a Lady of the Order of the Thistle (LT), and thereby granted the title lady.

She holds honorary degrees of Doctor of Laws from the following universities:

- Strathclyde
- Aberdeen
- St Andrews
- Glasgow Caledonian
- Stirling
- West of Scotland
- The Open University
- Edinburgh Napier
- Oxford

She is a fellow of the Royal Society of Arts and the Royal Society of Edinburgh (2017), and an Honorary Fellow of St Hugh's College, Oxford.

She is an honorary professor of the Chinese University of Hong Kong.

Angiolini is a Master of the Bench of the Middle Temple, one of the four Inns of Court.

In 2002, she was made Alumnus of the Year by the University of Strathclyde.

In June 2011, Angiolini received the Special Achievement Award from the International Association of Prosecutors in Seoul, South Korea.

On 24 November 2022, Angiolini was awarded The Herald's 'Lifetime Achievement Award' at the newspaper's Scottish Politician of the Year Awards, for outstanding contributions to public life.

In May 2023, Angiolini took part in the coronation of Charles III, representing the Order of the Thistle.

On 10 December 2024, it was announced that Angiolini would succeed Prince Edward, Duke of Edinburgh, as Lord High Commissioner to the General Assembly of the Church of Scotland. Angiolini, as a Roman Catholic, was initially barred by law from becoming Lord High Commissioner; legislation was introduced in February 2025 to remove that legal barrier. The Church of Scotland (Lord High Commissioner) Act 2025 received royal assent on 3 April 2025. She was appointed to the post on 16 May 2025.

== Personal life ==
She married Italian Domenico Angiolini in 1985, and they have two sons together. Her hobbies include walking, picking wild mushrooms, and cinema.

== See also ==
- First women lawyers around the world

Legal offices
Preceded by Neil Davidson	Solicitor General for Scotland; 2001–2006	Succeeded by John Beckett
Preceded by Colin Boyd	Lord Advocate; 2006–2011	Succeeded by Frank Mulholland
Preceded by Lord Mackay of Clashfern	Lord Clerk Register; 2023–present	Incumbent
Academic offices
Preceded by Andrew Dilnot	Principal of St Hugh's College, Oxford; 2012–2025	Incumbent
