= British Association of Aesthetic Plastic Surgeons =

British medical association

- Type: Teaching organization
- Legal status: Society
- Purpose: Teaching cosmetic surgical techniques
- Location: Cambridge, UK
- Services: Certification, meetings, workshops

The British Association of Aesthetic Plastic Surgeons (BAAPS) is a British surgical organisation based at the Royal College of Surgeons of England premises in London, established as the British Society of Aesthetic Plastic Surgeons in 1979.

Nora Nugent is the president .

In April 2022 the association performed an audit and discovered that the number of patients being treated for serious complications following cosmetic surgery abroad in the last four years had increased by 44% in 2021.
