= Journal of Plastic, Reconstructive & Aesthetic Surgery =

- Discipline: Surgery
- Language: English

Publication details
- Former name: British Journal of Plastic Surgery
- Publisher: Elsevier (United Kingdom)
- Open access: Yes

Standard abbreviations
- ISO 4: J. Plast. Reconstr. Aesthet. Surg.

Indexing
- ISSN: 1748-6815 (print); 1878-0539 (web)

Links
- Journal homepage

The Journal of Plastic, Reconstructive & Aesthetic Surgery, formerly the British Journal of Plastic Surgery, is the journal of plastic surgery of the British Association of Plastic, Reconstructive and Aesthetic Surgeons. It is open access and abstracted and indexed in Scopus and other databases.
