= Phillip Norreys =

Irish theologian

Phillip Norreys, Irish theologian, fl. 1427–1465.

A native of the diocese of Dublin, Ireland, Norreys made a successful career for himself in the church and Oxford University. He was vicar of Dundalk from 1427, and Doctor of Theology at Oxford by 1435. He was later successively canon, prebendary and Dean of St Patrick's Cathedral, Dublin, occupying the latter post by 1457. He also held the post of rector of Trim.

His controversies covered matters that had previously concerned his fellow Irishmen, Richard FitzRalph, Henry Crumpe and Dr. John Whitehead. In 1431 he was attacked by the mendicant friars for having Oxford University issuing him letters protecting him from slander. In 1437 he appeared before the papal judge-delegate and the Bishop of Bath & Wells because of attacks he made against the friars during his university lectures. When Norreys was supported by Oxford, the friars appealed to Rome and after a term of imprisonment by Henry VI, Norreys was declared guilty of heresy by a papal court in 1443.

He successfully appealed to the Council of Basel, by whom his sentence of excommunication was revoked. Pope Calixtus III then ordered the friars to leave him alone.

Norreys wrote sermons, a tract called 'Declamationes', a book of scriptural commentary and the Contra mendicitatem validam.

== Sources ==
- A New History of Ireland, volume one.
