= John Whitehead (theologian) =

Irish theologian

John Whitehead (fl. 1389–1415) was an Irish theologian.

A native of Ireland, Whitehead studied at Oxford where in 1408 he is referred to as a Doctor of Theology. Up to 1415 he was rector of Stabannan, County Louth. Like Henry Crumpe and Richard FitzRalph he was involved in sermonical attacks upon the Franciscan friars. He attended the 1409 Council of Pisa as proctor of the Archbishop Fleming of Armagh.

His works include:

- Determinacio in materia de mendicitate/Assessment in the matter of mendicant poverty
- Determinacio de confessione et absolucione/Assessment concerning confession and absolution

== See also ==
- Thomas de Hibernia
- Master Patrick of Ireland
- John Clyn

== Sources ==
- A New History of Ireland, volume one.
