= Doncanus Hibernus =

Irish poet

Doncanus Hibernus, alias Joannes Duncanus ex Hibernia, was an Irish poet of the Renaissance period who was active 1536–39.

== Biography ==
Very little is currently known of Doncanus. He was the first Irish Latinist of note for some generations in continental Europe, possibly since Phillip Norreys. In the words of Jason Harris:

"The discovery of examples of humanist Latinity from the pens of Irish writers in the first half of the sixteenth century is a matter of no little consequence, for it provides a counterpoise to traditional accounts of the Renaissance in Ireland, which ultimately derive, for the most part unwittingly, from Tudor propaganda that presented the island as an isolated cultural backwater in need of foreign civility. Nationalist counter-narratives which depict Ireland as possessed of a pure Gaelic culture uncontaminated by outside influences ironically replicate the structure of this model. As will be seen, the writings of Doncanus Hibernus are of particular interest because they fit no existing account of the development of the Renaissance in Ireland."

A letter dated 25 March 1537 addressed to Johannes Aepinus in Hamburg, Philip Melanchthon wrote:

"There is here [in Wittenberg] one Duncanus the Irishman, who is, I gather, known to you, and whose character, disposition and studiousness I greatly approve. He hopes he might with your help be able to procure some money there [in Hamburg] so that he can remain at university a while longer. I understand that your are loaded down with duties like this over there, but I did not want this Irishman to lack a recommendation from me and I promise you the kindness would be very well placed in him. Therefore, if there is any hope, take some trouble that this scholarly fellow, who will some day be of value to the church, may receive assistance."

Melachton wrote a letter concerning Doncanus to Johannes Garcaeus the Elder the same day, stating of him that "he has a very honourable disposition, and he has attained great distinction in Latin and Greek, to which he has added the study of Christian teachings, so that he may at some time be able to be of value to the church of Christ."

== Published work ==
Doncanus's first work was "a small octavo booklet of sixteen pages containing a ten-line Epigramma to Viet Amerbach and an Octostichon to Thomas Cromwell ... a dedicatory letter of some 500 words addressed to Cromwell and a 263-line carmen heroicum on the themeof the dignity of the rôle of royal counsellor." Doncanus's dedicatory epistle is dated 18 February 1539.

Doncanus's second publication is dated 28 March 1539. Another small octavo printing of thirteen pages its contents were:

- 1 - a six line epigram on envy;
- 2 - a dedicatory epistole of some four hundred words;
- 3 - an epode of fifty-eight lines in "alternating dactylic hexameters and iambic trimeters";
- 4 - "a 147-linecarmen gratulatorium in dactylic hexameters."

According to the title page, it was published in honour of Edmund Bonner, who had recently become bishop of Hereford. "This event had taken place on 27 November 1538 while Bonner was occupied as ambassador to the French king in Paris. He had previously been sent as an ambassador to Lutheran north Germany in 1535, and it is possible that Doncanus had travelled to the continent in his company at that time."

== Sources ==
- https://www.academia.edu/12962541/_Ireland_s_First_Renaissance_Poet_The_Latin_Verse_of_Doncanus_Hibernus_in_Luke_Houghton_and_Gesine_Manuwald_eds_Neo-Latin_Poetry_in_the_British_Isles_Bristol_Classical_Press_2012_pp._230-249
- http://www.worldcat.org/title/neo-latin-poetry-in-the-british-isles/oclc/768569764
