= Bonaventure Baron =

Irish Franciscan friar and scholar (1610–1696)

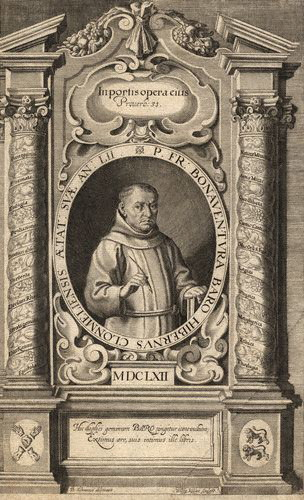
Friar Bonaventure Baron, O.F.M.

Bonaventure Baron (christened Bartholomew Baron; 1610 – 18 March 1696) was a distinguished Irish Franciscan friar and a noted theologian, philosopher, teacher and writer of Latin prose and verse.

== Biography ==
Baron was born at Clonmel, County Tipperary. His mother, one of 14 children, was a sister of the Irish Jesuit priest, Ambrose Baron. Franciscan friar and historian Luke Wadding was another of Baron's uncles. His brother Geoffrey Baron acted for the Irish Confederates in their negotiations with the continental rulers.

Bartholomew Baron joined the Franciscan community of Clonmel, pursued his studies in philosophy at the Old University of Leuven. Afterwards he proceeded to the Irish College of St Isidore in Rome, founded by his uncle, Wadding. Upon the completion of his theological courses, he was appointed professor and devoted himself specially to a defense of the Scotist system then generally assailed. During his stay in Rome he published numerous works on theology and poetry. His writings were lauded by Donegal-born physician Niall Ó Glacáin.

Ordained in 1634, he took the religious name Bonaventure. Around 1651 he left Rome, and went first to a house of his Order at Schwaz in Tyrol, and then to Salzburg, where he was kindly received by Archbishop Guidobald. He was sent as commissary into Habsburg Hungary (about 1656), was again in Schwaz (1661), went to Paris, taught for some time at Würzburg, where he published a volume of his Opuscula (1668), taught theology at Lyon in southern France and finally returned to Italy. It is said that representations were made to secure his appointment to the Archbishopric of Cashel, but that he declined the office. He was appointed historiographer in 1676 by Cosmo I de' Medici, Grand-duke of Tuscany. He was also elected a member of the Academy of Florence.

He died on 18 March 1696, and was buried at St Isidore in Rome. His tomb, with the inscription, written by John de Burgo, a rector of the college, still exists. Two contemporary oil paintings of him are extant: one is in the Franciscan friary in Clonmel, the other in a Franciscan friary in Dublin. There is also a fresco of Bonaventure in the aula of St. Isidore's College in Rome.

== Writings ==
While under the patronage of the Grand Duke he published the Trias Tuscia, in honor of three remarkable religious of Tuscany, and in the same year the Orbes Medicei.

His principal works are:

- Panegyrici Sacroprophani (Rome, 1643; Lyon, 1656)
- Obsidio et expugnatio Arcis Duncannon sub Thoma Preston
- Praelusiones Philosophicae (Rome, 1651; Lyon, 1661)
- Boetius Absolutus (Rome, 1653)
- Scotus defensus et amplificatus (3 volumes, Cologne, 1664)
- Cursus Theologicus (6 volumes, 1670)
- Opuscula (4 volumes of "small works", 1666–71)
- Annales Ordinis Sanctae Trinitatis pro redemptione captivorum ab anno 1198 usque ad annum 1297 (Rome, 1864), his last work, a history of the Order for Redemption of Captives (Trinitarians), from 1198 till 1297.

== See also ==
- Froinsias Ó Maolmhuaidh
- Proinsias Ó Doibhlin
- Concobhar Ó Duibheannaigh
- Thomas de Hibernia
