= Clonmel Borstal =

Former prison system for juvenile offenders in Ireland (1906–1957)

Coordinates: 52.355°N 7.7°W

St. Patrick's Borstal Institution, Clonmel, was established in Ireland in 1906 as a place of detention for young male offenders aged between 16 and 21, located in Clonmel, County Tipperary.

== History of the site ==
The Clonmel Institution is significant as it was the only borstal (youth detention centre) instituted in Ireland and was established on the site of the historic town jail. Accordingly, there is much local history connected to the site, going back to the aftermath of the Cromwellian Conquest of Ireland.

For example, after being denounced by three men who desired a share of the £5 bounty upon the heads of priests, Augustinian Friar William Tirry was arrested at Fethard while vested for Mass on Holy Saturday, 25 March, 1654. He was immediately taken to Clonmel Gaol and held there pending trial. On 26 April, he was tried by a jury and a panel of Commonwealth judges, including Colonel Solomon Richards, for violating the Proclamation of 6 January 1653, which defined it as high treason for priests to remain in Ireland. In his own defense, Fr. Tirry replied that while he viewed the Commonwealth as the lawful government, he had no choice but to disobey its laws, as the Pope had ordered him to remain in Ireland. Fr. Tirry was according found guilty and sentenced to death by hanging, which was carried out in Clonmel on 2 May 1654.

Friar William Tirry was beatified by Pope John Paul II along with 16 other Irish Catholic Martyrs on 27 September 1993. The Augustinian order celebrates his feast day on 12 May.

The famous Sean nos song Príosún Chluain Meala was composed in the Gaol by one O'Donnell, a member of the Whiteboys originally from Iveragh, County Kerry, who was held in Clonmel Gaol awaiting execution by hanging upon the following Friday. According to Donal O'Sullivan, O'Donnell had two companions awaiting the rope with him and that their heads were posthumously severed from their bodies and displayed spiked upon the prison gates. "The Gaol of Cluain Meala," a highly popular and often sung English translation of the lyrics, was made by County Cork poet, Jeremiah Joseph Callanan (1795–1829).

== Foundation ==
Clonmel Borstal was established following the recommendations of the 1895 Report of the Departmental Committee on Prisons, more generally known as the Gladstone Committee. In contrast to nearby St. Joseph's Industrial School, Ferryhouse, which had been initiated by Arthur Moore, a local Nationalist and Catholic M.P., the Borstal was promoted by the Unionist and Protestant M.P. Richard Bagwell. Bagwell, a commissioner for education, became the president of the Borstal Association of Ireland, which was founded at Clonmel Town Hall in May 1906. Among other duties, it sought to find employment for those who had completed their sentence.

The institution was modelled on an innovative approach to young-offender reform then being developed at a similar facility at the town of Borstal in England. On the transfer of the adult prisoners to other institutions, the Clonmel Borstal acquired all of the old prison grounds.

== Borstal system in Clonmel ==
The Prevention of Crime Act 1908 envisaged that youths aged between 16 and 21 who were charged with serious offences could undergo a programme of discipline intended to rehabilitate them, segregated from the influence of adult prisoners. The Criminal Justice Administration Act 1914 extended the borstal programme to those charged with less serious offences.

A District Court could not impose a borstal sentence directly but could only recommend to a Circuit Court that a detainee might be considered for borstal. If the Circuit Court judge agreed, he could order the confinement of the youth at the borstal from 2 to 4 years. Unlike Industrial Schools, the borstal was under the authority of a governor and a staff of warders.

The average number at Clonmel at any given time was about 50. Only about half of these had been sent directly by a court. The others were transferred by order of the Minister for Justice from the ordinary prisons. The regime in Clonmel allowed a level of trust to develop between the staff and detainees. At the discretion of the Governor, the boys could be allowed out into the town to find work.

== Post Irish independence ==
=== Clogheen Workhouse ===
For a brief period during the Irish Civil War, the prisoners were transferred to the Workhouse at Clogheen, while the Borstal buildings at Clonmel were occupied by Irish Free State military forces. While the exact date of the transfer in 1922 is disputed, Reidy gives it as most probably 3 October. The inmates at Clogheen Workhouse were in turn transferred to other Unions. One week later, 17 of the boys escaped, and on the night of 4 November, the town was suddenly abandoned by the Free State forces and occupied the following day by Republicans. Four days later, the Republicans gave notice that the facility was to be vacated immediately as they intended to set it on fire.

The 81 inmates and the staff were hurriedly moved to the sanctuary of the nearby Fever Hospital. Petrol was used to ensure that the main buildings were totally destroyed despite the torrential rain. The boys were marched to the nearby town of Cahir, where they were accommodated for a few days before removal to Kilkenny. The institution remained in Kilkenny until 1924, when it returned to the original accommodation at Clonmel.

=== Cork ===
Again, in 1940, during the Second World War the Irish Army occupied its buildings and detainees were transferred temporarily to Cork Prison.

=== Dublin ===
The Irish Borstal continued to operate until 1956, when all remaining occupants were transferred to St. Patrick's Institution, Dublin.

== End of the Borstal system in Ireland ==
This Borstal system came to an end in 1956 when St. Patrick's Institution was transferred to a disused section of the Women's Prison at Mountjoy Jail. The system of 'reformation' through a programme lasting years was dropped and instead the sentencing regime more closely mirrored that for the broader prison population. In 1958, of the 256 youths sent to St. Patrick's at its new location in the grounds of Mountjoy, over 100 served sentences of from one to three months. The practice of allowing the detainees to leave the grounds for work in the locality was also ended.

The Criminal Justice Act 1960, introduced by Minister for Justice Oscar Traynor, brought sweeping changes to the system of detention regarding young adults, and abolished the term 'Borstal' from the working lexicon of criminology and penal reform in Ireland.

== References and sources ==
Notes

Sources

- Cherry, Richard R. "Juvenile crime and its prevention". Journal of the Statistical and Social Inquiry Society of Ireland. XII. Part XCI (1910/1911). Dublin: 435–450. hdl:2262/7921. To download click VIEW/OPEN
- Osborough, Nial (1975). Borstal in Ireland: Custodial provision for the young adult offender 1906-1974 (Extracts). Institute of Public Administration, Dublin, 1975. ISBN 0-902173-66-9.
- Kilcommins, Shane Crime, punishment, and the search for order in Ireland, Institute of Public Administration, Dublin, 2004. ISBN 978-1-904541-13-4
- Reidy, Conor; Mary Ó Drisceoil; Proinsias Ó Drisceoil (2006). "Borstal in Clonmel: The Institution and its Inmates, 1906-1914". Tipperary Historical Journal. Co. Tipperary Historical Society: 256. (Not yet available on line).
- Reidy, Conor (2009). Ireland's 'Moral Hospital': The Irish Borstal System 1906-1956. Irish Academic Press. ISBN 978-0-7165-2980-4.
- James S Gibbons The Borstal System pp 405–406 in Proceedings of the ... annual Congress of Correction of the American Correctional Association 1910. At Internet Archive.
