= Clonmel =

Town in County Tipperary, Ireland

Clonmel Cluain Meala (Irish)
- Town
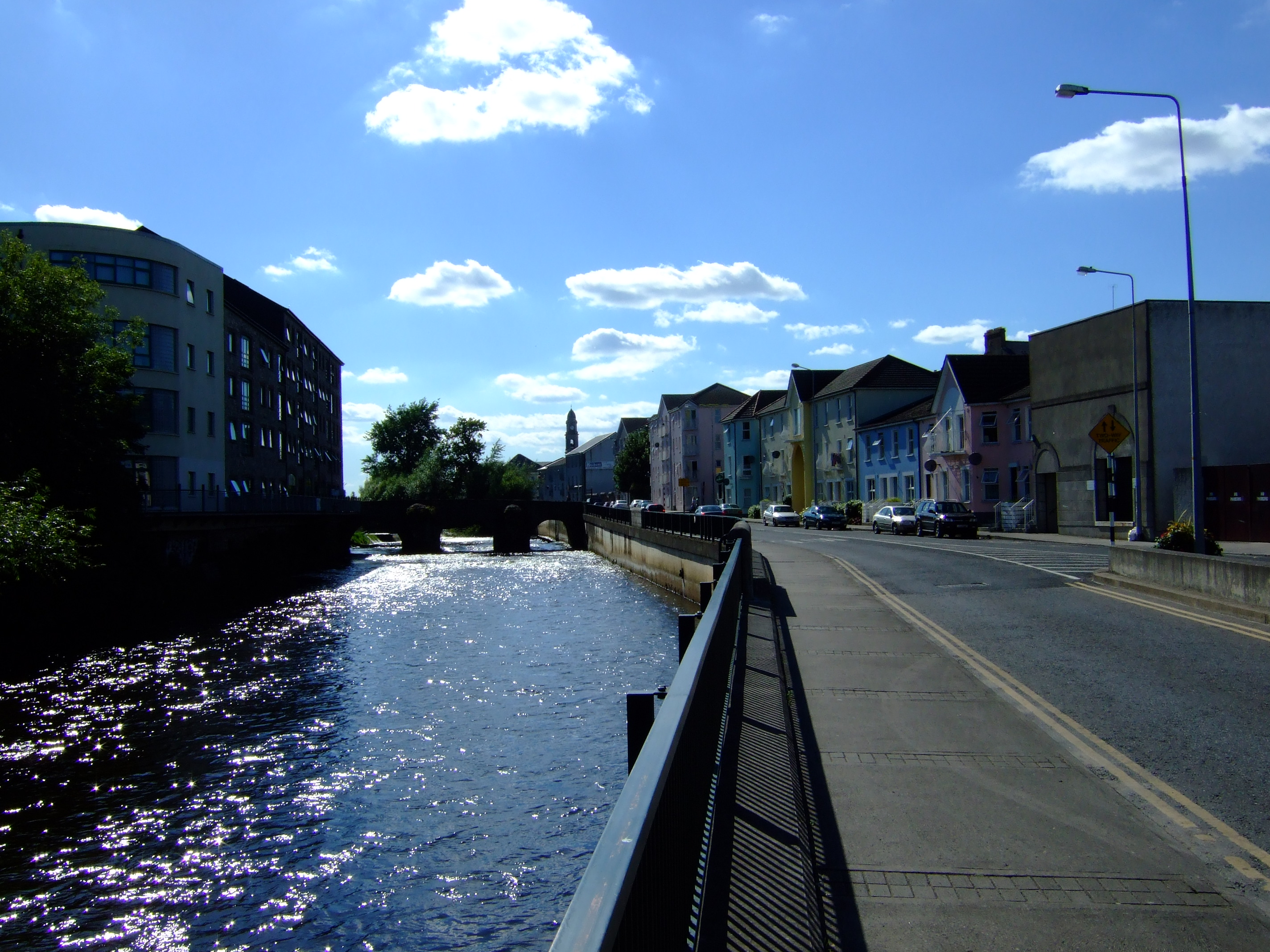
- The Quays, Clonmel.

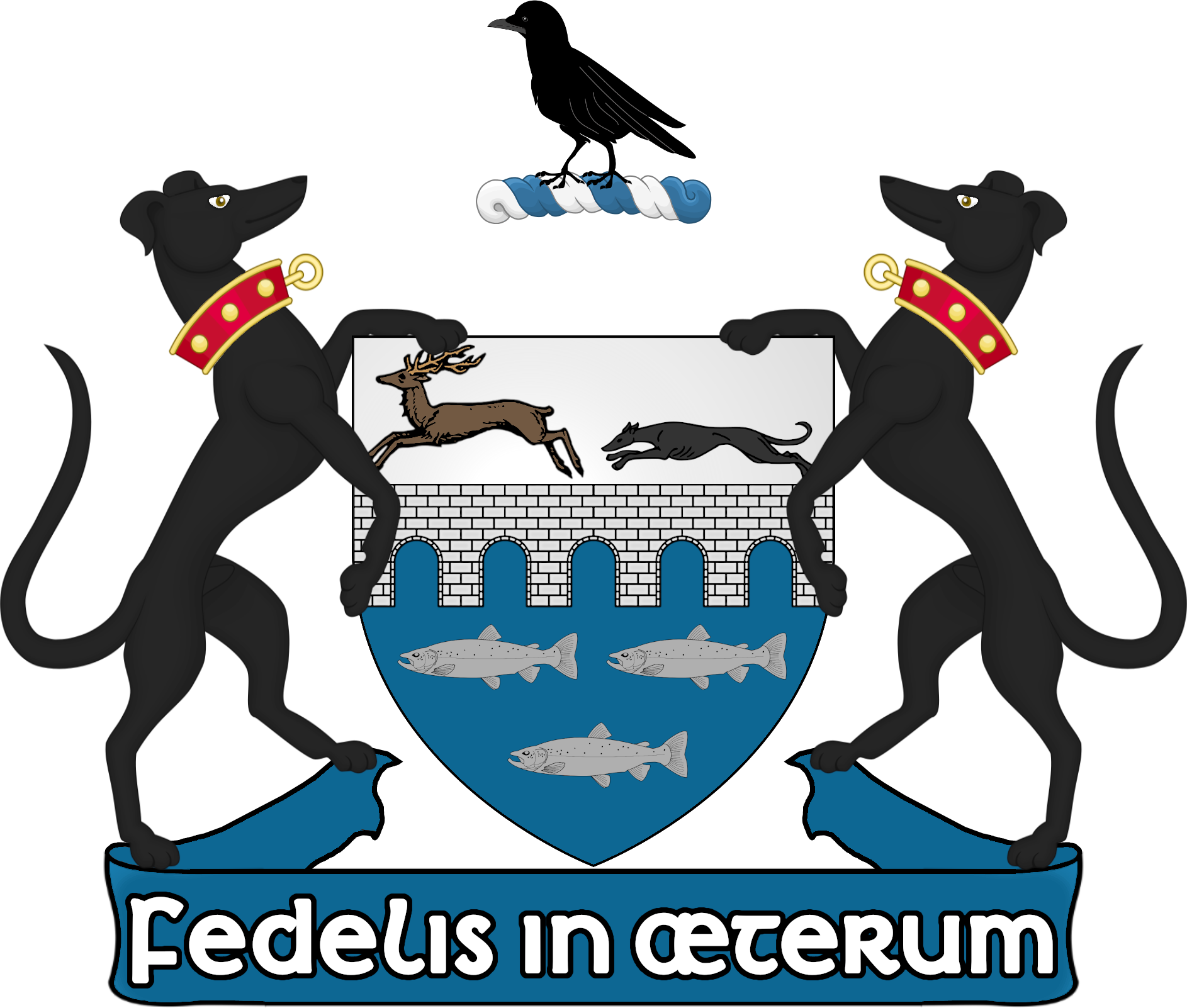
- Coat of arms
- Motto: Fidelis in Æternum (Latin) "Faithful Forever"
- Location in Ireland
- Coordinates: 52.3539°N 7.7116°W
- Country: Ireland
- Province: Munster
- County: County Tipperary

Government
  - Dáil constituency: Tipperary South
  - EP constituency: South

Area
  - Total: 10.5 km^{2} (4.1 sq mi)

Population (2022)
  - Total: 18,369
  - Density: 1,750/km^{2} (4,530/sq mi)
- Time zone: UTC0 (WET)
  - Summer (DST): UTC+1 (IST)
- Eircode: E91
- Telephone area code: 052
- Irish Grid Reference: S199229

Clonmel (Irish: Cluain Meala, meaning 'honey meadow') is one of two county towns, along with Nenagh, and the largest settlement of County Tipperary, Ireland. The town is noted in Irish history for its resistance to the Cromwellian army which sacked the towns of Drogheda and Wexford. With the exception of the townland of Suir Island, most of the borough is situated in the civil parish of St Mary's which is part of the ancient barony of Iffa and Offa East.

== Etymology ==
The name Clonmel is derived from the anglicisation of the Irish name Cluain Meala meaning "honey meadow" or "honey valley". While it is not clearly known when it got this name, some sources suggest that it is associated with the fertility of the soil and the "richness of the country" in which it is located.

== History ==
=== Town walls ===
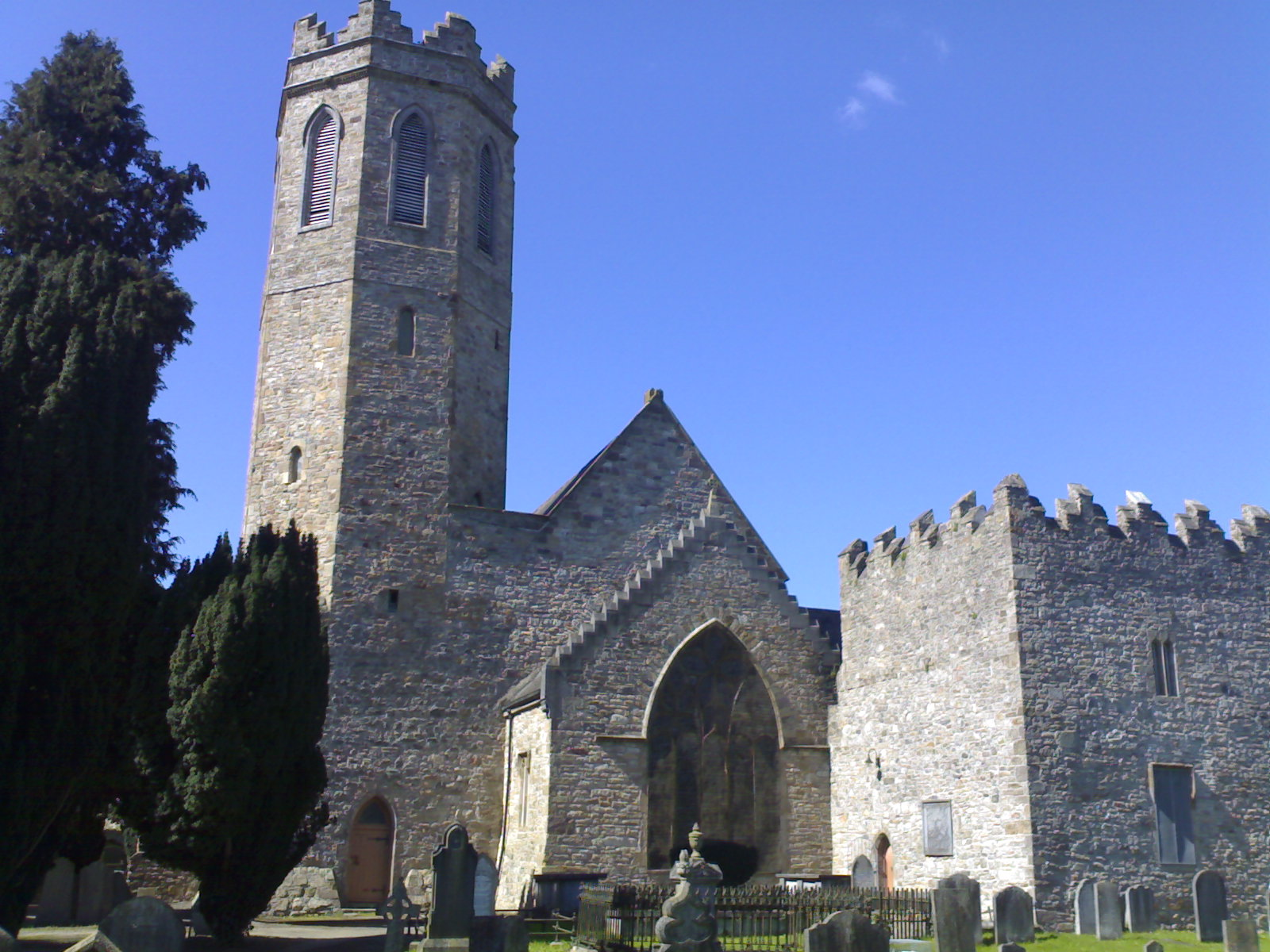
Old Saint Mary's Church

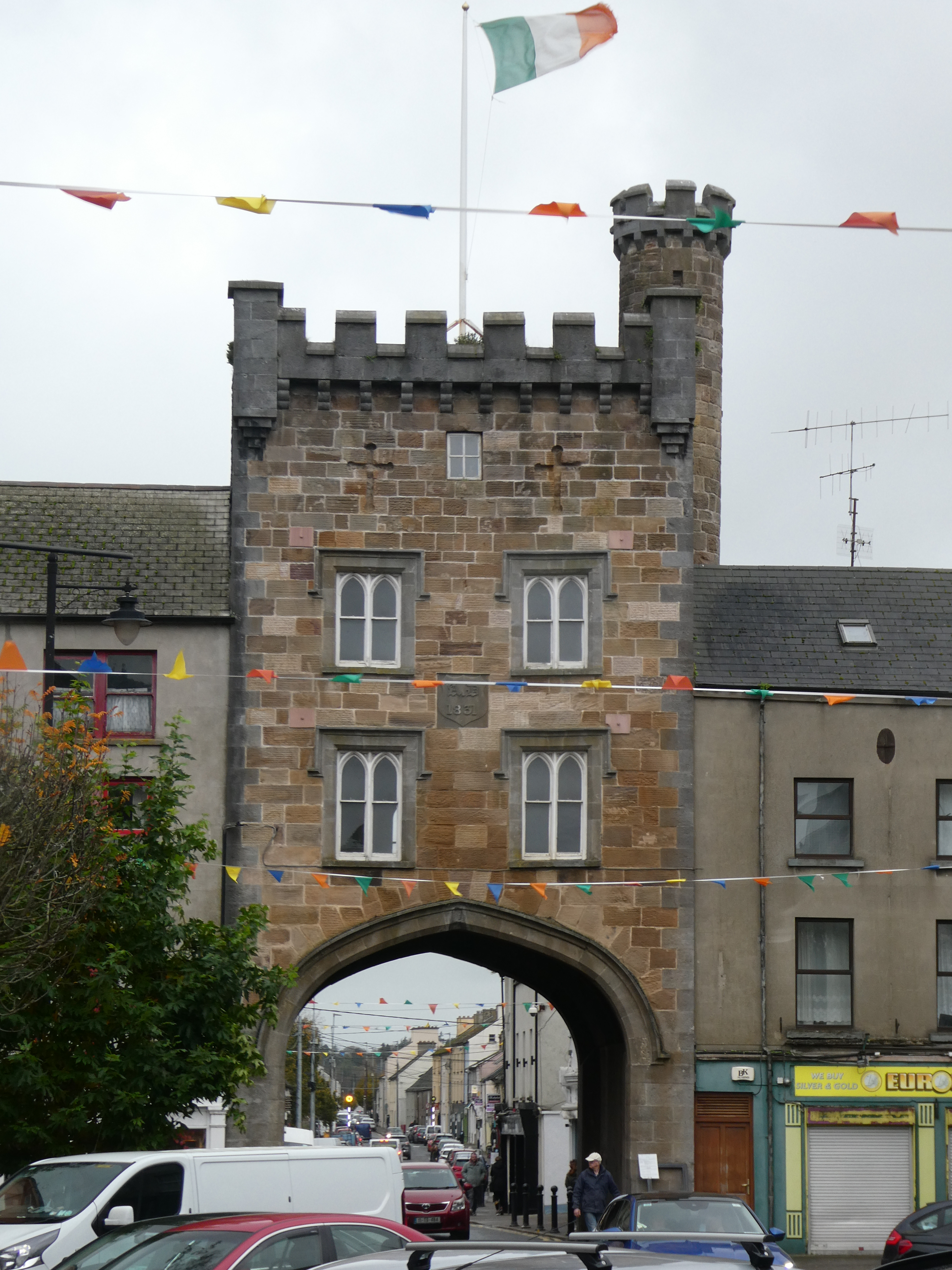
West Gate of the town walls

Clonmel grew significantly in medieval times and was protected by town walls. A small section of the town walls remains in place near Old St. Mary's Church. This church was originally built in the 14th century or earlier but has been reconstructed or renovated on numerous occasions. It was fortified early in its history, the town being strategically important, initially for the Earls of Ormonde, and later the Earl of Kildare. Some fortified parts of the church were destroyed or damaged during the mid-17th century Cromwellian occupation.

One of the former entry points into the town is now the site of the West Gate, a 19th-century reconstruction of an older structure. There were originally three gates in the walled town, North, East and West – with the South being protected by the river Suir and the Comeragh Mountains. The West Gate is now an open arched entrance onto O'Connell Street, the main street of the town.

=== Elizabethan era ===
On 17 September 1583, while a fugitive during the last stages of the Second Desmond Rebellion, Fr. Muiris Mac Ionrachtaigh, chaplain and confessor to the Rebel Earl of Desmond, was taken prisoner upon Sliabh Luachra and taken to Clonmel for imprisonment, while he continued his priestly ministry to the best of his ability.

According to historian James Coombes, "Here, as in other southern towns, Counter-Reformation Catholicism was already beginning to make a real impact; and, as in these other towns, the citizens of Clonmel were beginning to come up against the problem of combining loyalty to the Pope with loyalty to the Queen. Maurice MacKenraghty continued his ministry during what proved to be a long imprisonment".

In April 1585, his jailer was bribed by Victor White, a leading townsman, to release the priest for one night to say Mass and administer Communion in White's house on Easter Sunday (11 April 1585). Permission was granted, and Fr. MacKenraghty spent the whole night hearing Confessions.

The jailer, however, had secretly tipped off the President of Munster Sir John Norris, who had just arrived at Clonmel. According to historian James Coombes, "Norris arranged to have White's house surrounded by soldiers and raided. The raiding party entered it shortly before Mass was due to begin and naturally caused great panic. Some people tried to hide in the basement; others jumped through the windows; one woman broke her arm in an attempt to escape. The priest hid in a heap of straw and was wounded in the thigh by the probing sword of a soldier. Despite the pain, he remained silent and later escaped. The soldiers dismantled the altar and seized the sacred vessels".

According to historian Judy Barry, Fr. Mac Ionrachtaigh, "surrendered himself when he learned that White would otherwise be executed in his place. He refused to take the oath of supremacy and was condemned to death. On 30 April 1585 he was tied to the tail of a horse and taken to the market place, where he was partially hanged. Accounts differ as to whether his executioners were persuaded to behead him without quartering his body. At all events, after his remains had been exhibited for some days on the market cross, they were handed over to local Catholics for honourable burial".

According to historian James Coombes, the former location of Victor White's house near Lough Street in Clonmel continued to be nicknamed "Martyr Lane" until well into Cromwellian times. Fr. Muiris Mac Ionrachtaigh was beatified by Pope John Paul II, along with 16 other Irish Catholic Martyrs, on 27 September 1992.

=== Corporation regalia ===
Under a charter granted by James VI and I, Clonmel became a free borough on 5 July 1608, and the mayor and officers of the town were granted the power to "name, elect and constitute one Swordbearer and three Sergeants-at-Mace". The present sword and two silver maces date only from Cromwellian times. The sword, of Toledo manufacture, was donated by Sir Thomas Stanley in 1656 and displays the arms and motto of the town. The larger mace is stamped 1663.

=== Cromwellian period ===
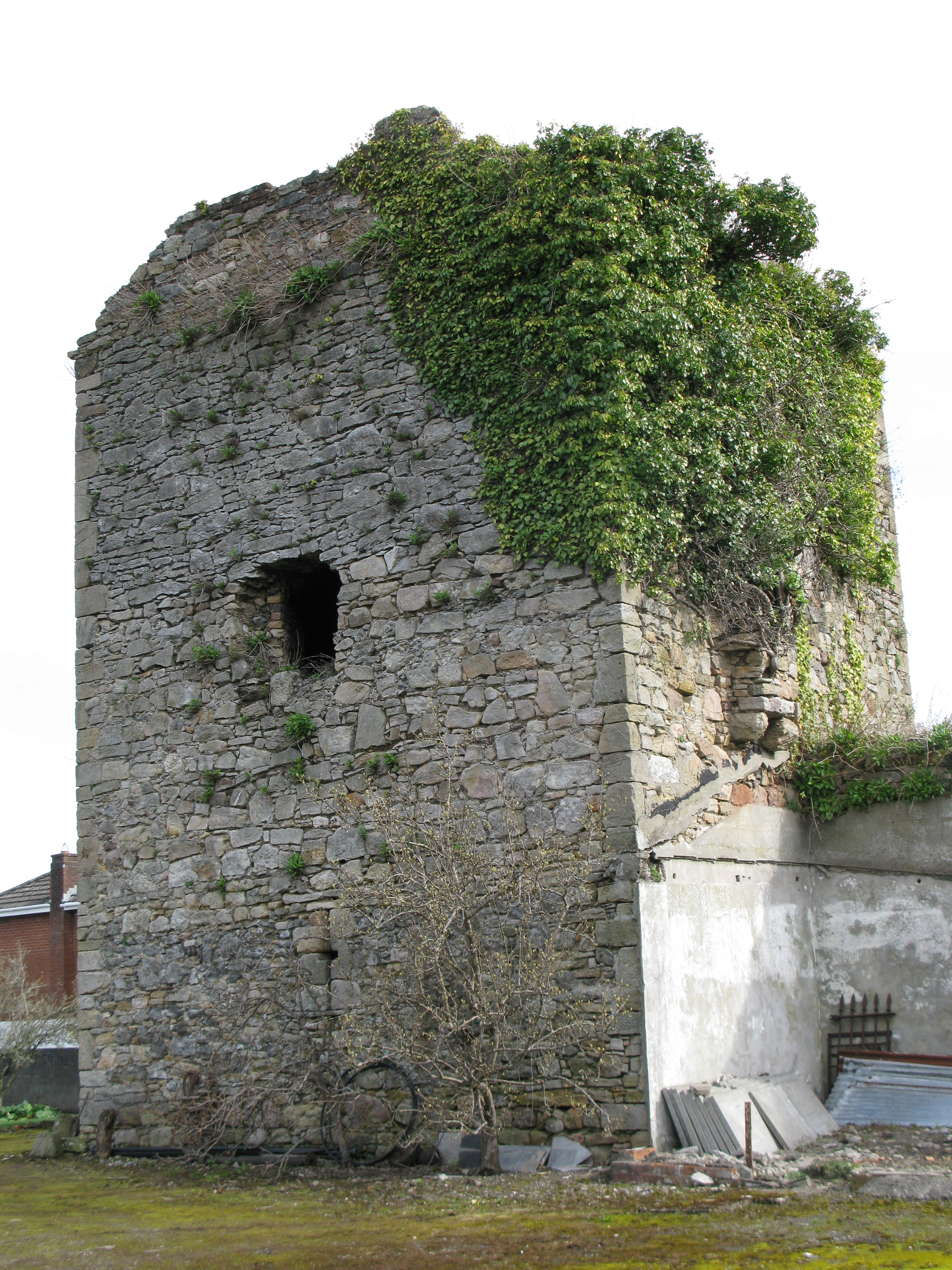
One of the remaining towers of Clonmel's defensive wall

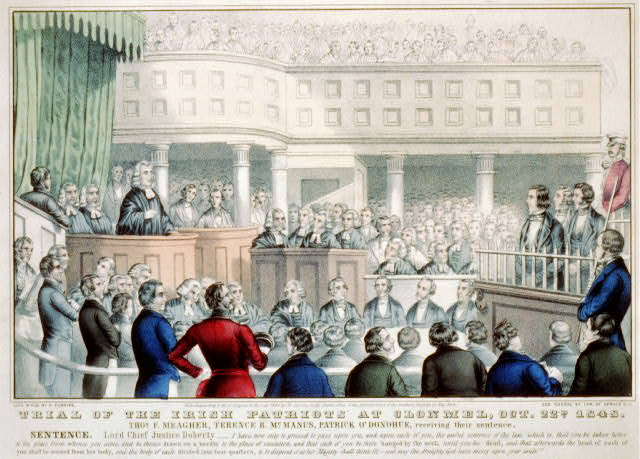
Young Irelanders stand trial before Justice Blackburne at Clonmel, 1848

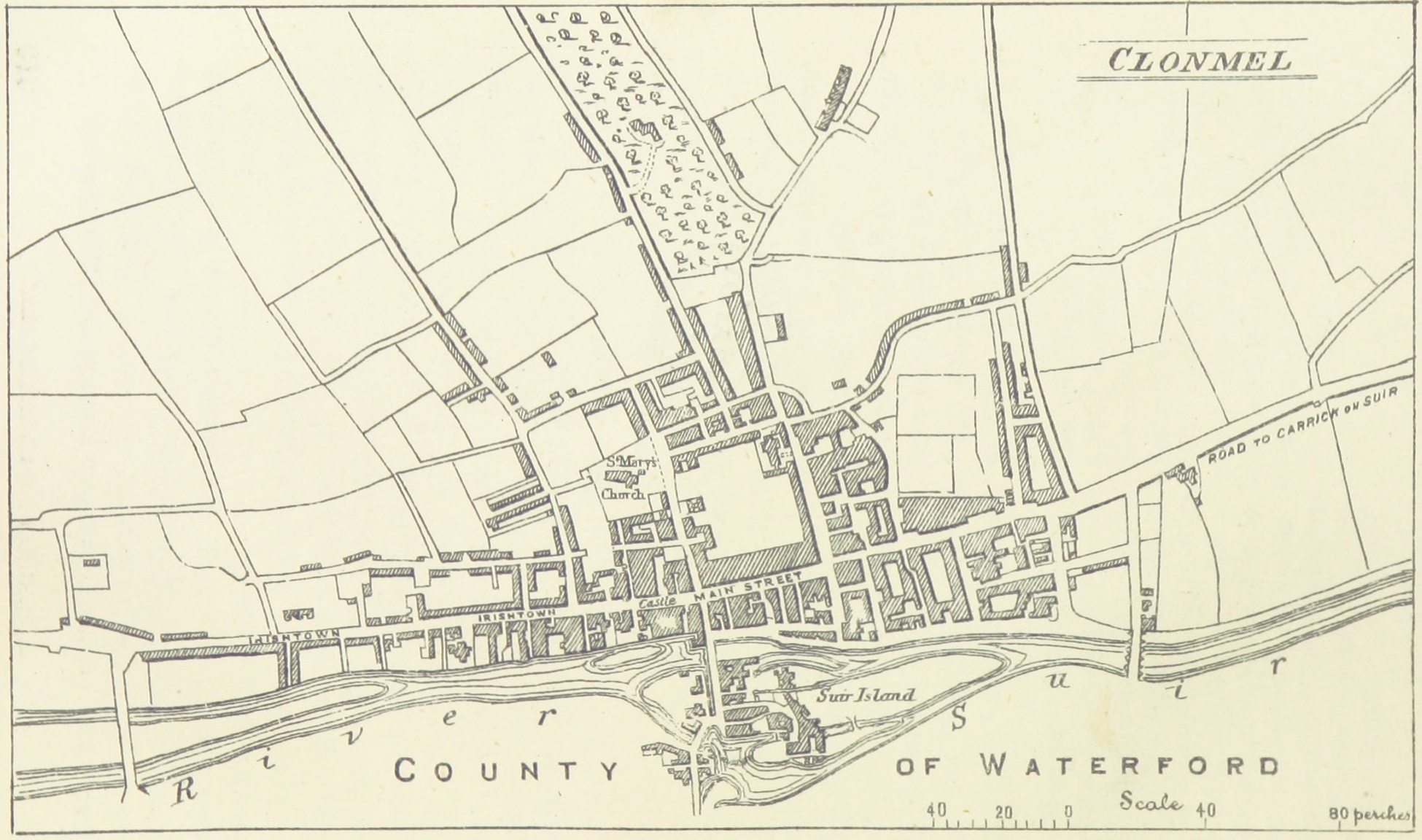
Map of 17th-century Clonmel. Note "Irishtown" in the west.

Oliver Cromwell laid siege to Clonmel in May 1650. The walls were eventually breached, but Hugh Dubh O'Neill, the commander of the town's garrison, inflicted heavy losses on the New Model Army when they tried to storm the breach. That night, O'Neill, deciding that further resistance was hopeless due to a lack of ammunition, led his soldiers and camp followers out of the town under cover of darkness. The story is told that Cromwell became suspicious of O'Neill's desperate situation when a silver bullet was discharged by the townspeople at his troops outside the walls. The following morning, 18 May 1650, mayor John White was able to surrender the town on good terms as Cromwell was still unaware of the garrison's escape just hours before. Although feeling deceived, Cromwell did not put the inhabitants 'to the sword' as occurred elsewhere.

After being denounced by three men who desired the £5 bounty and arrested at Fethard while vested for Mass on Holy Saturday, 25 March 1654, Augustinian Friar William Tirry was taken to Clonmel Gaol (on the future site of the Clonmel Borstal) and held there pending trial. On 26 April, he was tried by a jury and Commonwealth judges, including Colonel Solomon Richards, for violating the proclamation of 6 January 1653, which defined it as high treason for priests to remain in Ireland. In his own defense, Fr. Tirry replied that while he viewed the Commonwealth as the lawful government, he had no choice but to disobey its laws, as the pope had ordered him to remain in Ireland. Fr. Tirry was according found guilty and sentenced to death by hanging, which was carried out in Clonmel on 2 May 1654.

An account told by Franciscan Friar Matthew Fogarty, who had been tried with Friar William Tirry, supplies further details: "William, wearing his Augustinian habit, was led to the gallows praying the rosary. He blessed the crowd which had gathered, pardoned his betrayers and affirmed his faith. It was a moving moment for Catholics and Protestants alike."

Despite the efforts of a Puritan minister to silence him, Fr. Tirry told the assembled crowd, "there is only one true Church, whose head is the pope: Pope and Church are to be obeyed. He publicly forgave the three men who had betrayed him, and... stated explicitly that he had been offered life and favour, it would renounce his religion." Fr. Tirry was then hanged, after which he was buried, with some ceremony, in the ruins of the Augustinian friary in nearby Fethard. The evidence is that he was buried in the grounds, rather than inside the ruins of the church, but it has not yet been possible to locate his grave. Fr. William Tirry was beatified by Pope John Paul II along with 16 other Irish Catholic Martyrs on 27 September 1993. The Augustinian order celebrates his feast day on 12 May.

=== 18th century ===
During the second half of the 18th century, the Sean-nós song Príosún Chluain Meala was composed inside Clonmel Gaol by one O'Donnell, a member of the Whiteboys originally from Iveragh, County Kerry, who was being held awaiting execution by hanging upon the following Friday. According to Donal O'Sullivan, O'Donnell had two companions awaiting the rope with him and that their heads were posthumously severed from their bodies and displayed spiked upon the prison gates. "The Gaol of Cluain Meala", an English translation of the lyrics, was made by County Cork poet Jeremiah Joseph Callanan (1795–1829).

=== 19th century ===
A permanent military presence was established in the town with the completion of Kickham Barracks in 1805. During an 1807 visit to Ireland on behalf of the London Hibernian Society, Welsh nonconformist minister Thomas Charles alleged ruefully that the Reformation in Ireland had failed because of the refusal of Protestant clergy to preach or educate in the local vernacular. Of his visit to Clonmel, Rev. Charles recalled, "All the county spoke Irish... they spoke Irish in the streets."

Following the failed attempt at rebellion near Ballingarry in 1848, the captured leaders of the Young Irelanders were brought to Clonmel for trial. The event was followed with great interest internationally and for its duration brought journalists from around the country and Britain to Clonmel Courthouse. Standing in the dock in the image opposite is Thomas Francis Meagher, Terence MacManus and Patrick O'Donoghue. Their co-defendant, William Smith O'Brien was also sentenced to be hanged, drawn and quartered, the last occasions such a sentence was handed down in Ireland. When delivering the guilty verdict, the foreman of the Grand Jury, R.M. Southcote Mansergh, great-grandfather of the academic Nicholas Mansergh stated:

We earnestly recommend the prisoner to the merciful consideration of the Government, being unanimously of opinion that for many reasons his life should be spared.

The sentences of O'Brien and other members of the Irish Confederation were eventually commuted to transportation for life to Van Diemen's Land. A conspiracy to rescue the prisoners on 8 November led by John O'Leary and Philip Gray was betrayed and resulted in the arrest at 'The Wilderness' of seventeen armed rebels led by Gray.

=== 20th and 21st centuries ===
Clonmel was the location of the foundation of the Labour Party in 1912 by James Connolly, James Larkin and William O'Brien as the political wing of the Irish Trades Union Congress.

In November 2015, the town was the location of Ireland's first marriage between two men.

== Administration and politics ==
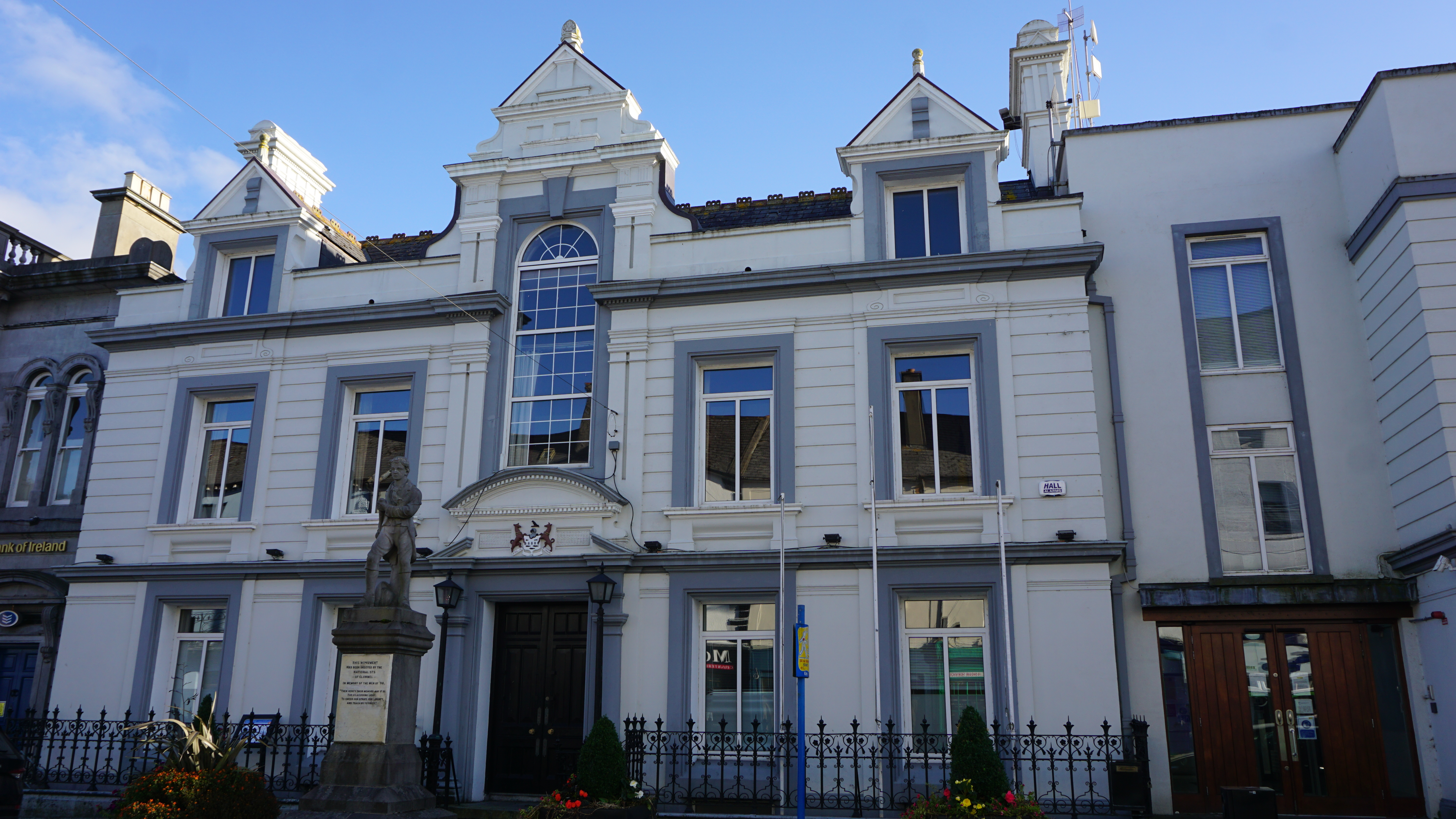
Clonmel Town Hall

Clonmel was one of ten boroughs retained by the Municipal Corporations (Ireland) Act 1840. The borough corporation elected 12 councillors. The first mayor of Clonmel Borough in 1843 was John Hackett, owner of the Tipperary Free Press. Clonmel Town Hall was opened in 1882.

Under the Local Government (Ireland) Act 1898, the area became an urban district, while its body retained the style of a borough corporation. The borough corporation became a borough council in 2002. On 1 June 2014, the borough council was dissolved and administration of the town was amalgamated into Tipperary County Council. Pat English was the last Mayor of Clonmel Borough Council.

Clonmel retains the right to be described as a borough. The chair of the borough district uses the title of mayor, rather than Cathaoirleach. As of the 2019 Tipperary County Council election, the local electoral area of Clonmel elected 6 councillors.

As of 2024, Clonmel is within Dáil constituency of Tipperary South which elects three TDs to Dáil Éireann (the Irish parliament).

== Geography ==
The town is built in the valley of the River Suir. It divides the town which is mainly located on the north bank. To the south, the town is surrounded by the Comeragh Mountains and Slievenamon to the northeast. To the north, east and west is some of Ireland's richest farmland, known as the Golden Vale. The town covers a land area of approximately 11.59 km^{2}.

=== Climate ===
Climate data for Clonmel (Gortmaloge)
Month	Jan	Feb	Mar	Apr	May	Jun	Jul	Aug	Sep	Oct	Nov	Dec	Year
Record high °C (°F)	15 (59)	15 (59)	17 (63)	19 (66)	23 (73)	27 (81)	28 (82)	28 (82)	25 (77)	20 (68)	16 (61)	15 (59)	28 (82)
Mean daily maximum °C (°F)	9 (48)	9 (48)	10 (50)	12 (54)	15 (59)	18 (64)	19 (66)	18 (64)	17 (63)	14 (57)	11 (52)	9 (48)	13 (56)
Mean daily minimum °C (°F)	5 (41)	5 (41)	5 (41)	6 (43)	9 (48)	11 (52)	13 (55)	13 (55)	12 (54)	10 (50)	7 (45)	5 (41)	8 (47)
Record low °C (°F)	−8 (18)	−4 (25)	−8 (18)	−2 (28)	−1 (30)	5 (41)	6 (43)	5 (41)	2 (36)	0 (32)	−9 (16)	−9 (16)	−9 (16)
Average precipitation mm (inches)	86.8 (3.42)	72.8 (2.87)	62.0 (2.44)	57.0 (2.24)	57.0 (2.24)	63.0 (2.48)	77.5 (3.05)	80.6 (3.17)	69.0 (2.72)	96.1 (3.78)	90.0 (3.54)	96.1 (3.78)	907.9 (35.73)
Average precipitation days	23	20	19	18	19	17	20	20	19	23	23	23	244

=== Flood defences ===
The River Suir floods the local area after very heavy rainfalls in the up-river catchment area of 2,173 km^{2}. The Office of Public Works (OPW) completed and installed a Flood Forecasting System which has been used since 2007. The flood of 2015 had a flow of 390m^{3}/s, 2004 had a flow of 354m^{3}/s with the flood of 2000 having a flow of 353m^{3}/s. The 2015 flood was the worst since that of 1946, which had seen a flow of 479m^{3}/s. Phase 1 of the Clonmel Flood Defence (planned to cope with a 100-year flood) started in 2007. It was scheduled to be completed by late 2009. Phases two and three were completed by 2012. Property omitted from Phase 1 along the Convent Road were protected in 2014 and the access to the river for the workmen's boat club was also raised. Flooding of October 2014 was less than a 1–5 flood with a flow of 300m^{3}/s. As part of a media exercise by the OPW the barriers were all put up.

The flood defence consists of demountable barriers, walls and earth banks. Flooding occurred at the Gashouse Bridge, Coleville Road, Davis Road, the Quays and the Old Bridge area before the flood defences.

== Demographics ==
Historical population
Year	Pop.	±%
1821	15,590	—
1831	15,134	−2.9%
1841	13,505	−10.8%
1851	11,589	−14.2%
1861	11,646	+0.5%
1871	10,112	−13.2%
1881	9,325	−7.8%
1891	8,480	−9.1%
1901	10,167	+19.9%
1911	10,209	+0.4%
1926	9,056	−11.3%
1936	9,391	+3.7%
1946	9,857	+5.0%
1951	10,471	+6.2%
1956	11,134	+6.3%
1961	11,087	−0.4%
1966	11,457	+3.3%
1971	12,291	+7.3%
1981	14,808	+20.5%
1986	15,517	+4.8%
1991	15,562	+0.3%
1996	16,182	+4.0%
2002	16,910	+4.5%
2006	17,008	+0.6%
2011	17,908	+5.3%
2016	17,140	−4.3%
2022	18,369	+7.2%

The 2016 census used a new boundary created by the Central Statistics Office (CSO) to define the town of Clonmel and environs, resulting in a population figure of 17,140. The 2022 census (undertaken on 3 April 2022) determined that Clonmel had a population of 18,369, making it the 27th largest urban area in Ireland. The population was about 12,400 in 1985.

== Economy ==
=== Retail ===
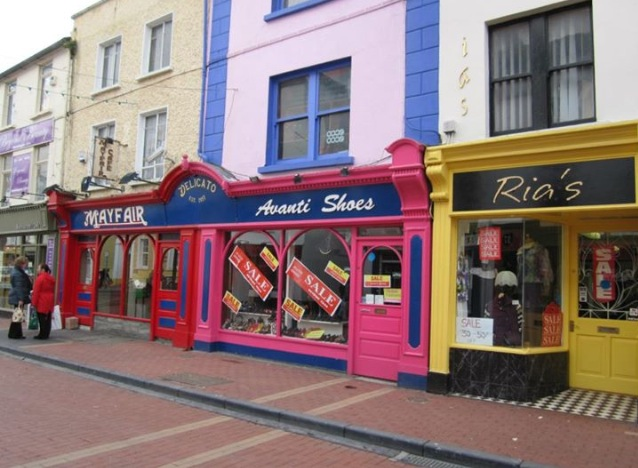
Mitchell Street in Clonmel

Clonmel's main shopping streets include Gladstone Street, O'Connell Street, Mitchell Street and Market Place. Retailers in this area include Elverys Sports, Penneys, River Island, Easons and Lifestyle Sports.

The Showgrounds Shopping Centre, on Davis Road in Clonmel, has retailers such as M&S and TKMaxx.

The Poppyfield Retail Park is located on the outskirts of the town. Developed in 2004, it has stores such as DID Electrical, Supervalu, Maxi Zoo, Woodie's and World of Wonder. There is also a hotel on the site.

=== Industry ===
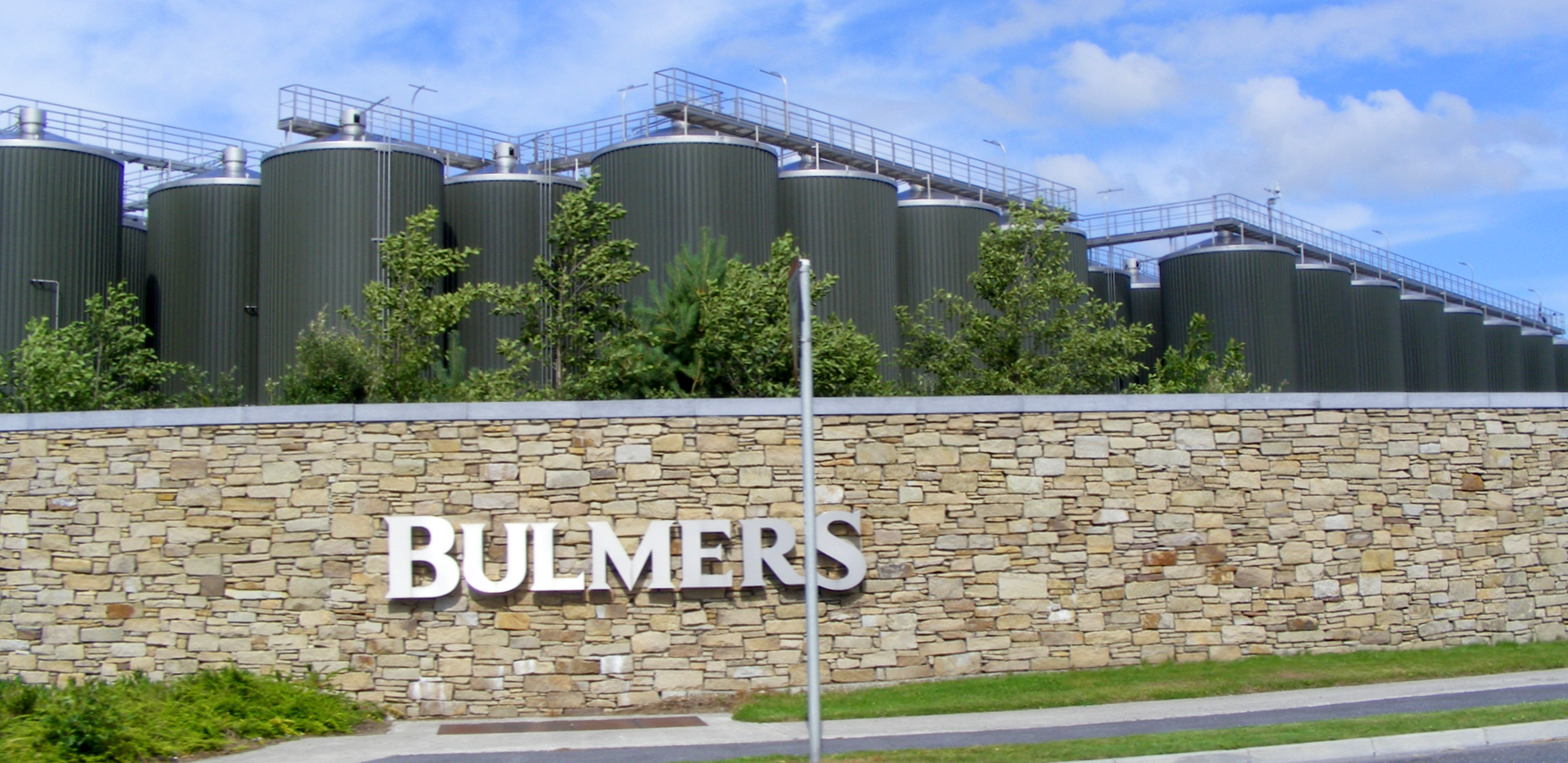
Bulmers cider factory

Clonmel is home to several multinational companies, including in the medical area. Abbott and Boston Scientific, both of which manufacture implantable medical devices, have facilities in the area.

Several beverages, both alcoholic and non-alcoholic, are produced in the town. Bulmers cider, known as Magners outside Ireland, was founded in the town and is still brewed in a complex 2 kilometres (1.2 mi) east of Clonmel with orchards surrounding it. While the original Bulmers' facility within the town was proposed for redevelopment as a visitor attraction, as of 2021 these plans had not progressed. The Glenpatrick Spring Water company bottles carbonated, still and flavoured water from the limestone rocks beneath Slievenamon for a number of supermarket chains.

Clonmel is home to international engineering and construction groups such as Kentz and Sepam which were both founded in the town.

== Media ==
=== Radio ===
Tipp FM is a local radio station for the county of Tipperary. It has its main office in Clonmel. In 2019, Tippfm had over 69,000 listeners tuning in every week, representing a market share to 35%. It broadcasts on FM, on 95.3, 97.1, 103.3 and 103.9. The Clonmel transmitter broadcasts on 97.1 MHz.

=== Print ===
Clonmel is home to several newspapers. These include The Nationalist, founded in 1890, which is a broadsheet newspaper that appears weekly. It covers both Clonmel town and South Tipperary and was formed to represent the views of the nationalist community in Tipperary. This led to the first editor being jailed under the Coercion Act on charges that he had intimidated a cattle dealer for taking a farm from which tenants had been evicted. It has been run by Johnston Press since 2014.

Also owned by Johnston Press is South Tipp Today, a free tabloid newspaper founded in 1995. It is delivered door-to-door in some areas, and available in local shops across South Tipperary.

The Sporting Press, also published and printed in Clonmel, covers news related to the greyhound community in Ireland. As of 2007, it had a circulation of approximately 7,500.

The Tipperary Free Press was established in 1826 by the future first Catholic Lord Mayor of Clonmel, John Hackett. It had a circulation of 45,650 in 1829 and supported "liberal" causes. It supported Daniel O'Connell's movement for Catholic emancipation. Hackett was sued for libel on several occasions for his caricatures of political rivals. Printed on O'Connell Street bi-weekly, it circulated in counties Tipperary, Waterford, Kilkenny, Cork and Limerick. In its later years, it assumed a Catholic-Whig political leaning and ceased printing in 1880 when it was replaced by the Tipperary Independent (1880–1892).

== Culture ==
=== Museums and galleries ===
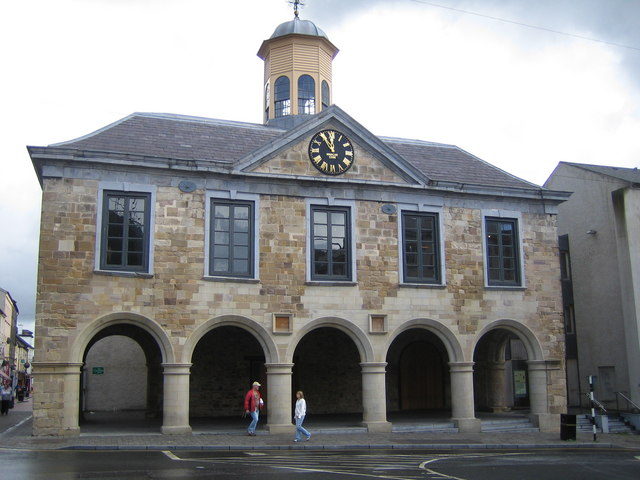
The Main Guard

The Tipperary Museum of Hidden History tells the history of County Tipperary from the Stone Age to the present. It is also host to several special exhibitions each year. It was the first custom-built county museum in Ireland.

The Main Guard was a civic building until 1810 when it was converted to shops. During a one restoration, some of its sandstone columns were found to have been 'reclaimed' from the Medieval ruins of the Cistercian Inislounaght Abbey at Marlfield. It was used in the past as a Tholsel or office to collect tolls, duties and customs dues, a place for civic gatherings and as a court. It now houses an exhibition showing the historic development of Clonmel, including a model of the town as it appeared in the 13th century.

The South Tipperary Arts Centre opened in 1996. As well as presenting a range of visual arts exhibitions in the main gallery space, the centre also host events such as music, performance, art classes, poetry readings and dance. The centre has an upstairs studio which is used for short term exhibitions and screenings, as well as for a variety of classes and workshops.

=== Theatre and cinema ===
The White Memorial Theatre building is a former Wesleyan/Methodist Chapel and was designed and built by local architect William Tinsley in 1843. The building was purchased in 1975 by St. Mary's Choral Society and named after society founder Professor James A White. In addition to hosting performances, the building hosts shows by the Stage Craft Youth Theatre group.

Clonmel's Stagecraft Youth Theatre, founded in 1998, provides training for young actors in several aspects of theatre practice. In 2011, a 45-seat studio theatre, known as "The Hub", was opened in Albert Street. The Hub is home to Stagecraft.

The IMC, with five screens and located on Kickham Street, is the town's only remaining cinema. Other cinemas formerly operated in the town including the Ritz, which opened in 1940 and was located on the site of the present Credit Union. The first cinema in the town opened in January 1913 as the Clonmel Cinema Theatre. Later renamed the Clonmel Electric Picture Palace, it was located at the rear of No. 35 Gladstone Street. It was soon followed by John Magner's Theatre at the Mall, which burned to the ground in 1919, to be re-built in 1921 with an increased capacity of over a thousand seats. It was eventually named the Regal Theatre and remodelled as an 850-seat theatre, which finally closed in 2001. It was in the Regal Theatre where the tenor Frank Patterson made his stage debut. The Oisin, in O'Connell Street, was of a similar scale and was also built in 1921. It was destroyed in a fire in 1965.

=== Festivals ===
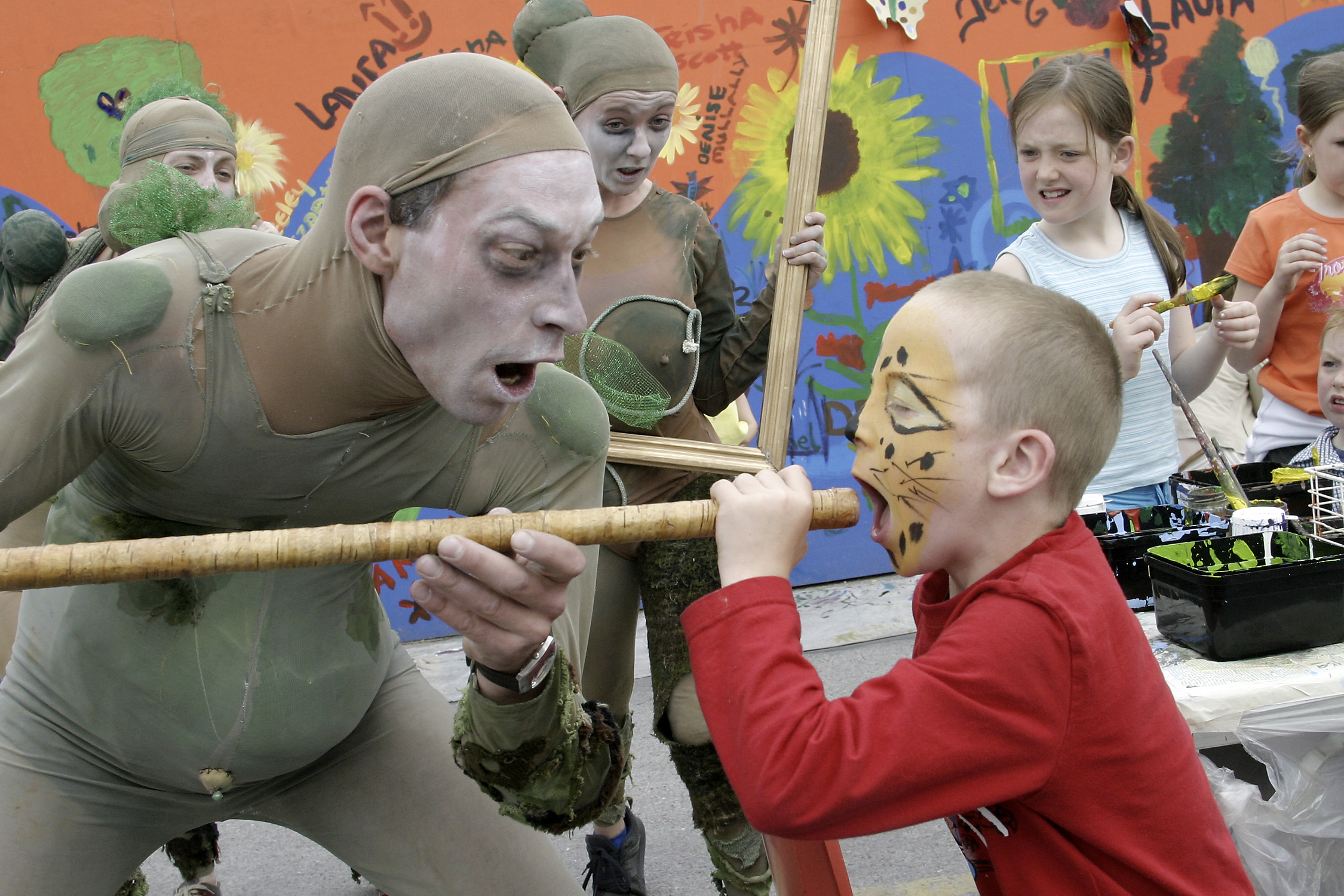
Street performance at Clonmel Junction Festival in 2004

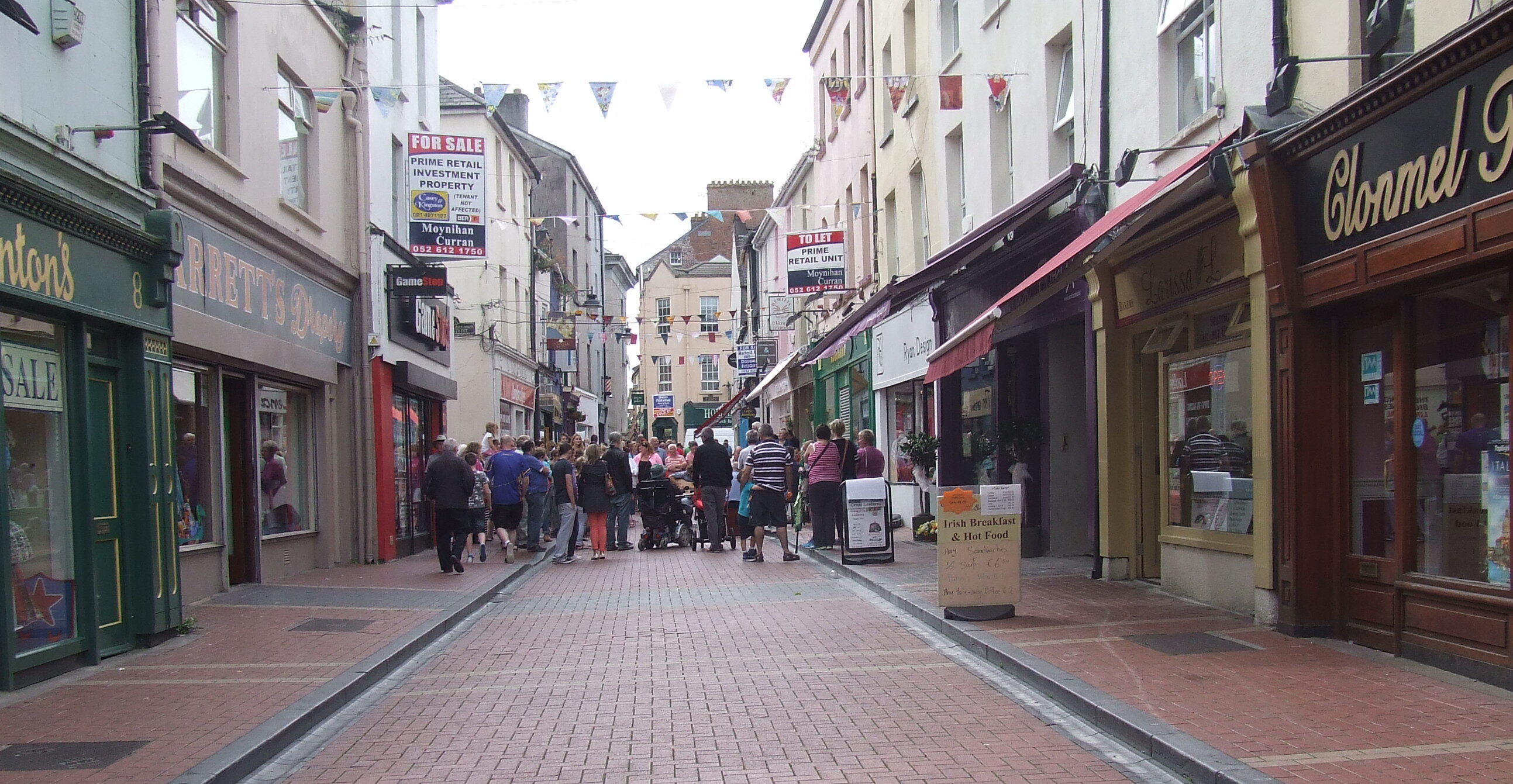
Mitchell Street during the busking festival in 2014

For nine days from the first weekend of July, the town hosts the annual Clonmel Junction Festival. It consists of a mix of street theatre, rock, traditional and world music. Children from local schools and community groups have previously been invited to participate with support from local artists.

"Finding a Voice" is a festival that is held around International Women's Day, 8 March. It presents performances of music by female composers.

The town is home to the International Film Festival Ireland, which focuses on independent films. Its inaugural event was during September 2009 and ran for five days. It subsequently became an annual event, occurring every September. The 2010 event expanded to include a Youth Film Festival, that showcased locally made short films.

Clonmel's busking festival runs for four days every August. It provides free music events during the day in the town centre, while at night a number of concerts take place in venues throughout the town.

=== Music ===
Banna Chluain Meala (translating as 'Clonmel band') was founded in 1971. Originally a brass band, it later developed as a brass and reed band, which included concert, marching and field show performances. The band also has a colour guard section. The band has been crowned IMBA (Irish Marching Bands Association) champions on a number of occasions.

Clonmel has hosted the Irish traditional music festival, the Fleadh Cheoil, on five occasions from 1992 to 1994 inclusive, and again in 2003 and 2004.

One of the better-known songs concerning Clonmel is "The Gaol of Cluain Meala", a translation from the turn of the 19th century by a Cork man, Jeremiah Joseph Callanan, of the traditional Irish-language song "Príosún Chluain Meala". It was revived by the balladeer Luke Kelly in the 1960s. The narrator in the Irish republican song "Galtee Mountain Boy" farewells Clonmel in the song. It was written by Patsy Halloran from Clonmel.

=== Clonmel in literature ===
Vertue rewarded, or The Irish princess (1693), one of the earliest romance novels written in the English language, tells the story of "Merinda" from High Street, Clonmel and a Williamite officer stationed in the town during the Jacobite war.

Raymond Chandler's 1939 novel The Big Sleep features Rusty Regan as a main character: "A big curly-headed Irishman from Clonmel, with sad eyes and a smile as wide as Wilshire Boulevard."

Charles Kickham's 1873 novel Knocknagow had two main characters modelled on Clonmel locals. These were his cousins, Dr T.J. Crean Sr. as "Arthur O'Conner" and his wife Clara Crean (née Kickham) as "Mary Kearney", who both lived on Queen Street at the time.

John Flanagan's 2009 novel The Kings of Clonmel uses Clonmel as a fictional kingdom. It is the eighth book in the Ranger's Apprentice series.

== Sport ==
=== Association football ===
Clonmel is home to Clonmel Celtic, Old Bridge, Wilderness Rovers and Clonmel Town who play in the Tipperary Southern & District League (TSDL).

=== Rugby ===
Clonmel Rugby Club plays in the All Ireland League, Division 2C. The rugby club was founded in 1892. Clonmel won the Munster Junior Cup for the first time in its 122-year history in 2014.

=== GAA ===
Clonmel is home to several Gaelic Athletic Association (GAA) clubs. Clonmel Óg was established in 1984 and it competes in the senior division. Moyle Rovers GAA club is based just outside the town. The Gaelic football club, Clonmel Commercials, won the 2015-16 Munster Senior Club Football Championship title. They went on to reach the semi-finals of the 2015–16 All Ireland Football Club championships, losing out to Ballyboden St. Endas, who would go on to win the championship. Together with their sister hurling club, St. Mary's, they are located on Western Road.

=== Watersports ===
Clonmel Rowing Club (CRC), founded in 1869, is located about 500 meters west of the town centre. The club won the Senior Men's 'eight' championships in 1920. The club is based on Moor's Island, on the Suir, and is known locally as "The Island". CRC has had a purpose-built boathouse since 1979, with boat storage on the ground floor. Upstairs are two squash courts, a function hall and dressing rooms.

The Workmen's Boat Club (WBC) was established in 1883. The property was leased from the Bagwell estate until 1999 when it was finally purchased by the club. In 2007, the club undertook the restoration of the historic racing craft Cruiskeen, which was built in the 1840s by GAA founder member Maurice Davin. The project took several years of cleaning, treatment and repair and the 38 ft./11.6m timber boat is now on permanent display in the County Museum, Clonmel.

=== Other sports ===
Clonmel Racecourse, also known as Powerstown Park, hosts both National Hunt (jump) and flat racing events. Clonmel Greyhound Stadium is also located in the town.

Clonmel's cricket club, United Cricket Clonmel, fields teams in competitions organised by the Munster Cricket Union. The area is also home to Clonmel Athletic Club which was founded in 1971.

== Education ==
=== Primary schools ===
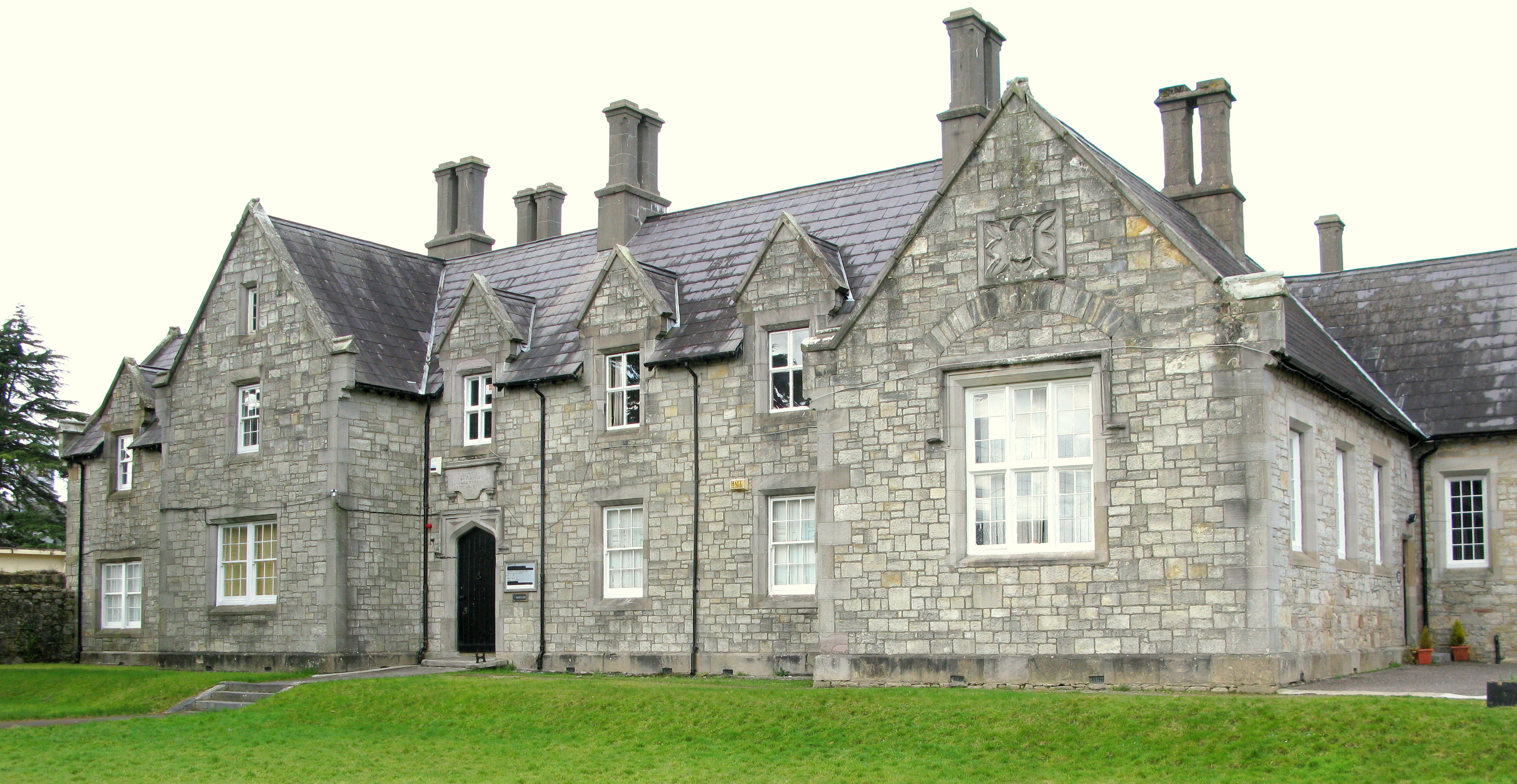
St. Mary's Parochial School

Primary schools in the area include Gaelscoil Chluain Meala which has around 200 pupils enrolled. Located at Irishtown and originally known as the "Free School", the school building was designed by two pupils of the architect John Nash.

St Mary's Parochial School, also known as the Model School, traces its roots to the Incorporated Society School of 1832. This Church of Ireland school is located on the Western Road.

Other primary and national schools include St Oliver's National School (founded in 1982), St.Mary's CBS, St. Peter and Paul's CBS, Sisters of Charity Girls School and Presentation Primary School.

=== Secondary schools ===
The larger secondary schools in Clonmel include Presentation Convent (girls; Roman Catholic; c. 470 pupils), Loreto Convent (girls; Roman Catholic; c. 480 pupils) and CBS High School (boys; Roman Catholic; over 700).

The Clonmel Central Technical Institute (CTI Clonmel) comprises three sections: an English-medium secondary school, an Irish-medium secondary school and a "College of Further Education". The English-medium school, Raheen College (or Coláiste Chluain Meala), is co-educational and under the control of the local Education and Training Board. It reputedly traces its history to 1842. The Irish-medium school (or Gaelcholáiste), named Gaelcholáiste Chéitinn after the poet Geoffrey Keating, was established in 2004 in response to a demand for second-level education through the medium of Irish. The college of further education, CTI Senior College of Further Education, offers Post Leaving Certificate (PLC) courses. As of 2024, CTI Clonmel had a combined enrollment of approximately 285 students, up from 238 in 2016.

=== Third level ===
Clonmel is home to a campus of the Technological University of the Shannon. This campus was previously part of Limerick Institute of Technology (LIT), until its merger with the Athlone Institute of Technology (AIT) to form the Technological University of the Shannon (TUS) in 2021. Courses in animation, visual effects and game design are undertaken at the TUS Clonmel campus.

== Transport ==
=== Roads ===
Clonmel is located on the N24, the national primary roadway that links the cities of Limerick and Waterford. The N24 westbound connects Clonmel to junction 10 of the Cork to Dublin M8 motorway, while eastbound it links the town with Kilkenny via the N76.

==== Bus ====
Charles Bianconi, onetime mayor of the town, ran his pioneering public transport system of horse-drawn carriages from Clonmel.

Clonmel is today served by three town bus routes (routes CL1, CL2 and CL9) operated by TFI Local Link.

Bus Éireann also operates multiple buses which serve the town, including the 55 Expressway service (between Limerick City and Waterford City), route 245 (from Clonmel to Cork City) and route 355 (to Waterford via Carrick On Suir).

JJ Kavanagh and Sons operate the 717 bus between Clonmel and Dublin Airport via Kilkenny City.

=== Rail ===
Clonmel railway station opened on 1 May 1852. Today there are two trains daily to Waterford via Carrick on Suir, and two to Limerick Junction (for main-line connections to Dublin), via Cahir and Tipperary town. There is no Sunday service.

=== Waterways ===
The River Suir had been made navigable to Clonmel from 1760 when completion of the River Suir Navigation in the 19th century allowed large vessels to reach the town's quays.

== Notable people ==
- Anne Anderson (born 1952), was Ireland's first female Ambassador to the United States of America, United Nations, France, Monaco and European Union, born in Clonmel.
- Bonaventura Baron (1610–1696), a distinguished Franciscan humanist, philosopher and writer was born in Clonmel.
- Charles Bianconi (1786–1875), one-time mayor of Clonmel, ran his pioneering public transport system of horse-drawn carriages from Clonmel
- George Borrow (1803–1881), polyglot, ethnologist of the Romani people and author of Lavengro, in which he briefly writes of his time in Clonmel, lived here in 1815
- Francis Bryan (1490–1550), English courtier and diplomat during the reign of Henry VIII, died in Clonmel in 1550
- Austin Carroll (1835–1909), Irish Catholic nun and writer
- Thomas Chamney, Irish athlete who ran 800m in Beijing Olympics in 2008
- Bridget Cleary (1869–1895), burned alive by her husband, Michael Cleary, because she was believed to be a shapeshifting fairy. The ensuing criminal trial was very high-profile.
- William J. Duane (1780–1865), American politician and lawyer from Pennsylvania, was born in Clonmel.
- Dave Foley is a professional rugby union player
- Sarah Pim Grubb (1746–1832), Quaker businesswoman, wife of John Grubb, died in Clonmel
- Vincent Hanley (1954–1987), a pioneering Irish radio DJ and television presenter, nicknamed "Fab Vinny". He worked mainly for Raidió Teilifís Éireann and was the first Irish celebrity to die from an AIDS-related illness
- Mary Elizabeth Southwell Dudley Leathley (1818–1899), writer, was born in Clonmel in 1818.
- Sir Lionel Milman, 7th Baronet (1877–1962), Anglo-Irish first-class cricketer and British Army officer
- Christy Moore, singer-songwriter from County Kildare, lived and worked in Clonmel in the 1960s
- Fred Murray, former professional football player, now personal masseur for Foo Fighters member Dave Grohl
- Vivian Murray, businessman
- Michael O'Brien (1933–2025), survivor of abuse at Ferryhouse, councillor and mayor of Clonmel
- Pat O'Callaghan was an Irish athlete and 1928 Olympic gold medalist
- Nellie Ó Cléirigh was an Irish lace authority and historian
- Mícheál Ó Súilleabháin (1950–2018), an Irish musician, held Professorship of Music at the Irish World Music Centre of the University of Limerick
- Frank Patterson (1938–2000), one of Ireland's most famous tenors, was native to the town
- Henry Parnell, 5th Baron Congleton (1890–1914), the youngest Member of Parliament to die in World War I, born in Clonmel
- Ramsay Weston Phipps (1838–1923), military historian, born in Clonmel, lived there off and on throughout his life
- Rozanna Purcell, model and Miss Universe Ireland 2010
- Adi Roche, co-founder of Chernobyl Children's Project International and 1997 candidate for the Irish Presidency
- Andrea Roche, best known Irish model and Miss Ireland 1997
- Symon Semeonis, or Simon Fitzsimons, was a 14th-century Franciscan friar who left Clonmel in 1323 on pilgrimage to the Holy Land. The account of his "Itinerary" is preserved in a manuscript in the Library of Corpus Christi College, Cambridge
- Laurence Sterne (1713–68), author of The Life and Opinions of Tristram Shandy, Gentleman, was born in the town, though his family returned to England soon after
- Anthony Trollope (1815–1852), a noted author, worked in the town for a period
- Stephen White (1575–1646) was an Irish Jesuit, historian and antiquarian born in Clonmel, who wrote about the early Irish saints

== Sister towns ==
Clonmel is twinned with several places:

- Costa Masnaga, Lombardy, Italy.
- Gangi, Sicily, Italy.
- Reading, Berkshire, England.
- Eysines, Aquitaine, France.
- Trofaiach, Styria, Austria.
- Peoria, Illinois, United States.
- Roeselare, Flanders, Belgium

== See also ==
- Grange, County Tipperary
- List of towns and villages in Ireland
- Market Houses in Ireland
- St Joseph's Industrial School, Clonmel
- St. Patrick's Well, Clonmel
