= Tipperary Free Press =

The Tipperary Free Press was a former regional newspaper, printed in the mid-19th century in Clonmel, County Tipperary in Ireland. The bi-weekly newspaper, which was in print from 1826 into the early 1880s, was distributed in counties Tipperary, Waterford, Cork, Limerick and parts of Kilkenny.

== History ==
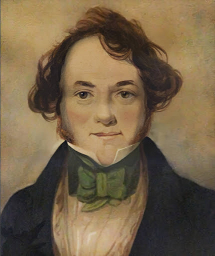
John Hackett c. 1843

The Tipperary Free Press was first printed in December 1826. It played a role in championing the cause of Catholic emancipation in Ireland, with a liberal and nationalist stance under its Catholic leadership. John Hackett, a politician, printer, bookseller and stationer who operated the first public library in the town, printed the newspaper on his premises at J. Hackett, Public Library, 101 Main Street (now O'Connell Street) in Clonmel. Editorship was successively passed over to his three sons, each following his footsteps as a mayor of Clonmel, himself having been in 1843 the first Catholic mayor of Clonmel since 1688. John Hackett was also the first Chairman of the National Bank of Ireland when founded in 1835 by Daniel O'Connell, leader of the emancipation movement.

The newspaper was published bi-weekly, reaching a circulation of 43,250 by 1832. It became the "chief organ" for the Catholic Association and Emancipation Party in the Clonmel constituency, South Tipperary and neighbouring counties.

In 1838, the smaller Clonmel Advertiser was bought by John Hackett and added as a sub-title to the Tipperary Free Press. Under the proprietorship of William Carson from 1811, the Clonmel Advertiser swayed from its initial conservatism to supporting both Daniel O'Connell's vision of Catholic emancipation and the anti-tithe movement, also supported by the Tipperary Free Press. However, following Carson's death in 1832, the Clonmel Advertiser became strongly opposed to O'Connell under the more staunchly protestant John Kempston until his death in 1838 and the subsequent buyout by Hackett. The Nenagh Guardian was then established by Kempton's son, in opposition to the Tipperary Free Press.

Contributors to the Tipperary Free Press included Maurice Lenihan, Richard Lalor Sheil, William Cooke Taylor, General Thomas Perronet Thompson and Michael Doheny.

The influence of the newspaper reportedly "faded" after John Hackett's retirement in 1861, and it "went out of existence" following the death of Henry O'Connell Hackett in 1880. It was replaced by the Tipperary Independent (1880–1892) which first appeared in November 1880.

== Editors ==
- 1826: John Hackett
- 1861: William Louis Hackett
- 1876: Henry O'Connell Hackett
- 1880: Edward Charles Hackett
