= Grange, County Tipperary =

Grange An Ghráinseach
- Village
- Location in Ireland
- Coordinates: 52°20′18″N 7°49′47″W
- Country: Ireland
- Province: Munster
- County: County Tipperary
- Time zone: UTC+0 (WET)
  - Summer (DST): UTC-1 (IST (WEST))

Grange (Irish: An Ghráinseach) is a village near Clonmel in County Tipperary, Ireland.

== History ==
In 1829, a catholic church was established in the village. In 1857, a school was established adjacent to the church. Separate boys' and girls' schools used the same building, and were headed by Thomas Hackett and his wife, Bridget, respectively. In 1932, school principal James Mulcahy combined the boys' and girls' schools. In January 1967, the school was amalgamated with the national school in North Grange, with 19 students moving to Grange School.

== Sport ==
The village is served by Ballybacon-Grange GAA, an intermediate hurling team in the Gaelic Athletic Association.

== See also ==
- List of towns and villages in Ireland
