= Nellie Ó Cléirigh =

Irish lace authority and historian

- Born: Nellie Beary; 29 January 1927; Clonmel, Co Tipperary
- Died: 16 October 2008 (aged 81); Dublin
- Known for: Lace historian and authority

Nellie Ó Cléirigh (29 January 1927 – 16 October 2008) was an Irish lace authority and historian.

== Biography ==
Nellie Ó Cléirigh was born Nellie Beary in Clonmel, County Tipperary, about 1927. She got her education from the Ursuline convent in Waterford before going on to study history and Irish in University College Dublin. She worked as a civil servant in the Land Commission, but on her marriage she had to resign as the marriage bar was still in effect.

She married Cormac Ó Cléirigh and they had three sons, named Conor, Niall and Shane.

Ó Cléirigh had studied embroidery and started her own handcraft business. She became an expert on lace and wrote about it as well as creating an archive of lace and related artefacts. Her in-depth study of the women around the skill lent itself to her study of the women of Ireland, which she then also turned into a book. She specifically looked at the lives of women who impacted Ireland, including Lady Aberdeen, Maria Edgeworth, Selina Crampton, Cecilia Saunders-Gallagher and Sister Aloysius.

She died in 2008 and was buried in Deansgrange Cemetery.

== Bibliography ==
- Carrickmacross Lace - Irish Embroidered Net Lace, a Survey and Manual with Patterns, (Dolmen Press, 1985)
- Limerick Lace: A Social History and a Maker's Manual (With Veronica Rowe)
- Valentia, A Different Irish Island
- Hardship and High Living (Portobello Press 2003)
