= St. Patrick's Well, Clonmel =

Medieval Christian site in County Tipperary, Ireland

St. Patrick's Well
- Tobar Phádraig
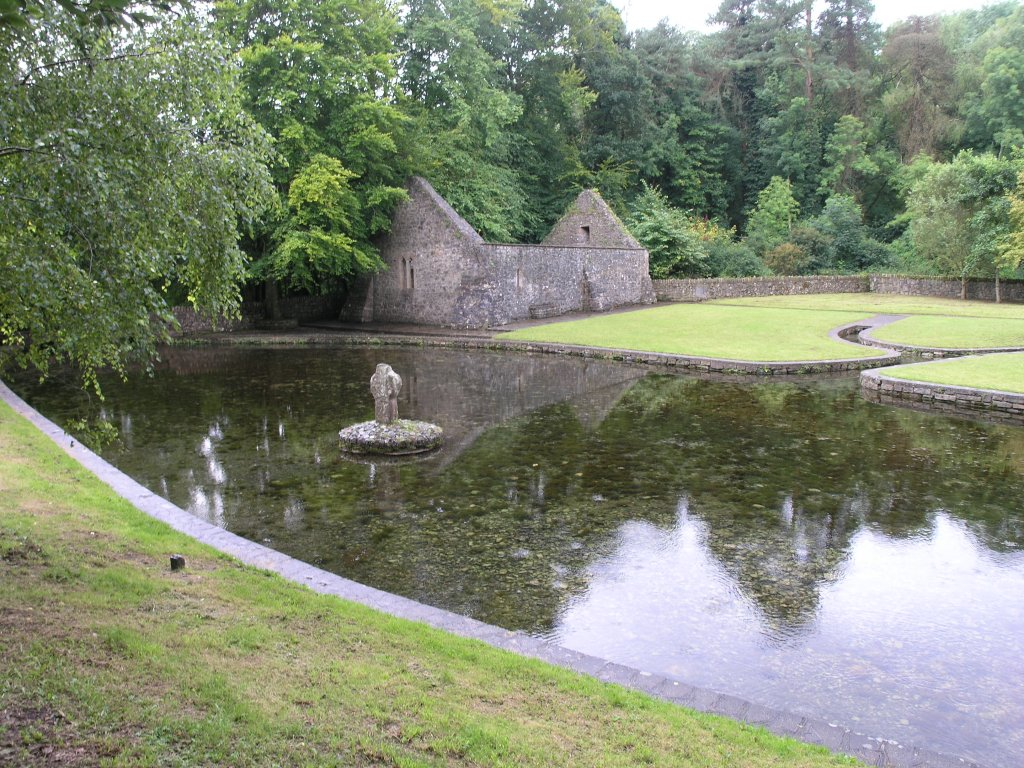
- Cross and church

- Location within Ireland
- 52°21′27″N 7°45′08″W
- Country: Ireland
- Denomination: Catholic
- Tradition: Roman Rite

St. Patrick's Well is a medieval Christian site located in County Tipperary, Ireland, consisting of a holy well, 12th-century church and an ancient stone cross.

== Location ==
St. Patrick's Well is located in the Marlfield area, about 3.6 km (2.2 mi) west of Clonmel town centre.

== History ==
Traditional history links the site with Saint Patrick, who proselytised Ireland in the 5th century. It is mentioned in a 10th-century Life of Declan of Ardmore, so it was active at that time. From the 12th to 16th centuries, St. Patrick's Well belonged to nearby Inislounaght Abbey. The crudeness of the stone cross has led to the belief that it is early.

In 1617, Nicholas Fagan, Abbot of Inislounaght was buried at St. Patrick's. The earliest reference to pilgrimage at the site was as late as 1619, when Pope Paul V granted a plenary indulgence to all pilgrims visiting St Patrick's Church, provided they went to confession, took the Eucharist and visited the church on Pentecost or St. Patrick's Day, any time from Vespers to sunset.

The Ordnance Survey letters, written by John Donovan who visited the site in the 1840s, say "it is still esteemed holy and visited by pilgrims far and near for the cure of disease especially headaches."

In 1914 Power described the well as a "great basin filled to the brim with bubbling crystal water.., close by it in the march is a stunted, rude and early celtic cross which marks a penitential station." Early 20th century photographs of the well show it surrounded by a low circular enclosing wall with a large ash tree growing out of the side. The remodelling of the site began in 1956 with the addition of the statue of St Patrick. In the late 1960s, the local St. Patrick's Day Society had the site remodelled; funding was provided by Sam Yorty, Mayor of Los Angeles, whose mother was from Clonmel. Additional funding came from Armand Hammer and the Irish-Israeli Society.

== Buildings and structures ==
=== Cross ===
At the centre of the lake is an undecorated early medieval stone cross.

=== Well ===
The well emerges from an underground stream. It flows through two long hallowed-out granite spouts, similar to those at St. Brigid's Well, Kildare. The stones have been identified as flumes from an early medieval horizontal watermill. Local tradition claimed that the water never froze over in winter.

=== Church ===
A rectangular limestone church with a high gable, it may have been used as a medieval parish church and continued as a place of Church of Ireland worship until the 18th century. The exterior has been re-pointed and restored. Within the church is a late medieval altar tomb, which came from the White Mortuary Chapel in St Mary's Church, Clonmel; it was brought here after the chapel was demolished in 1805.

A Romanesque fragment survives: a sandstone coign with chevron carvings, similar to that at Clonmacnoise. Window heads and an armorial plaque from Inislounaght Abbey are incorporated into the east wall.

=== Gallery ===
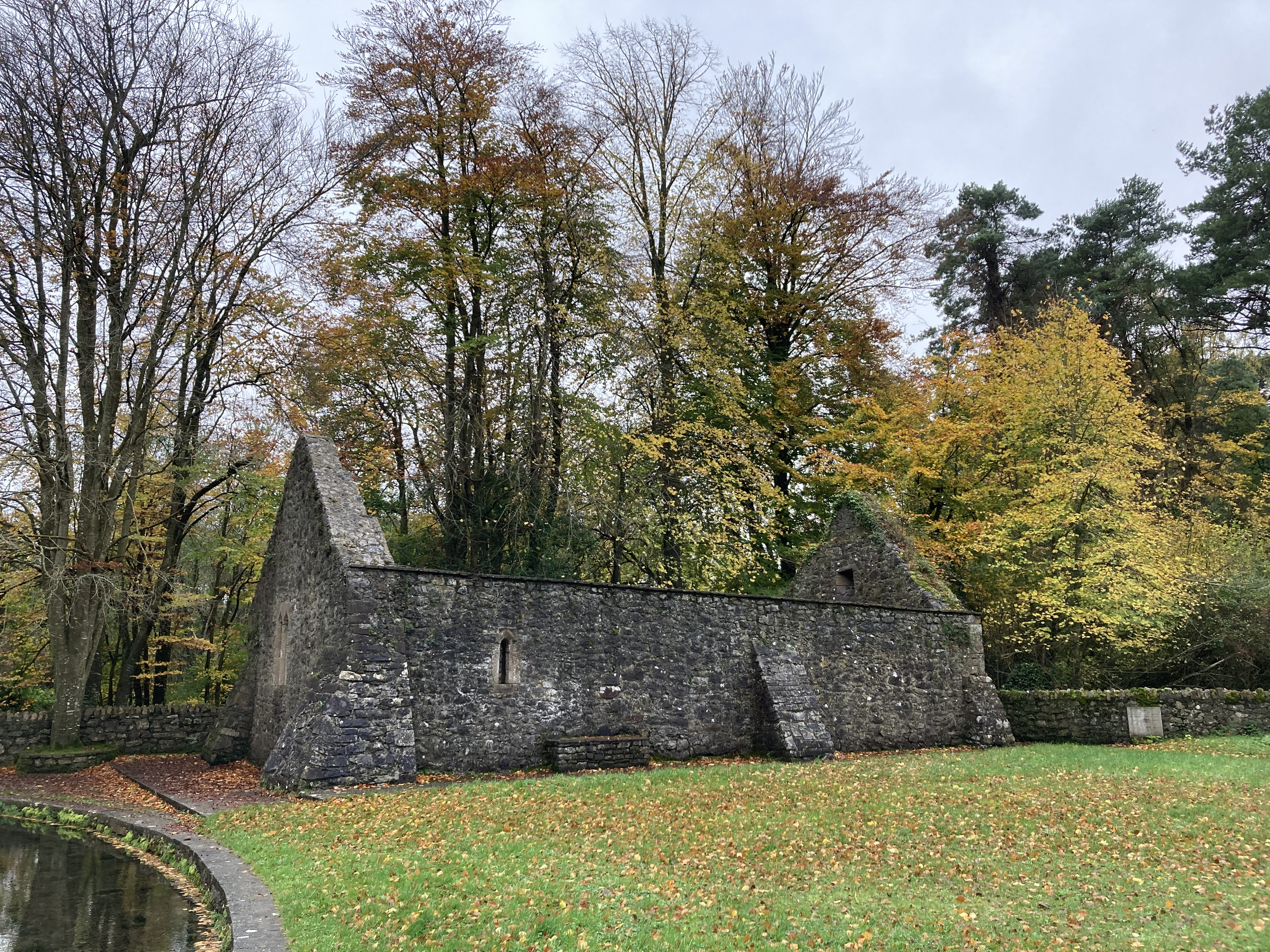
The church

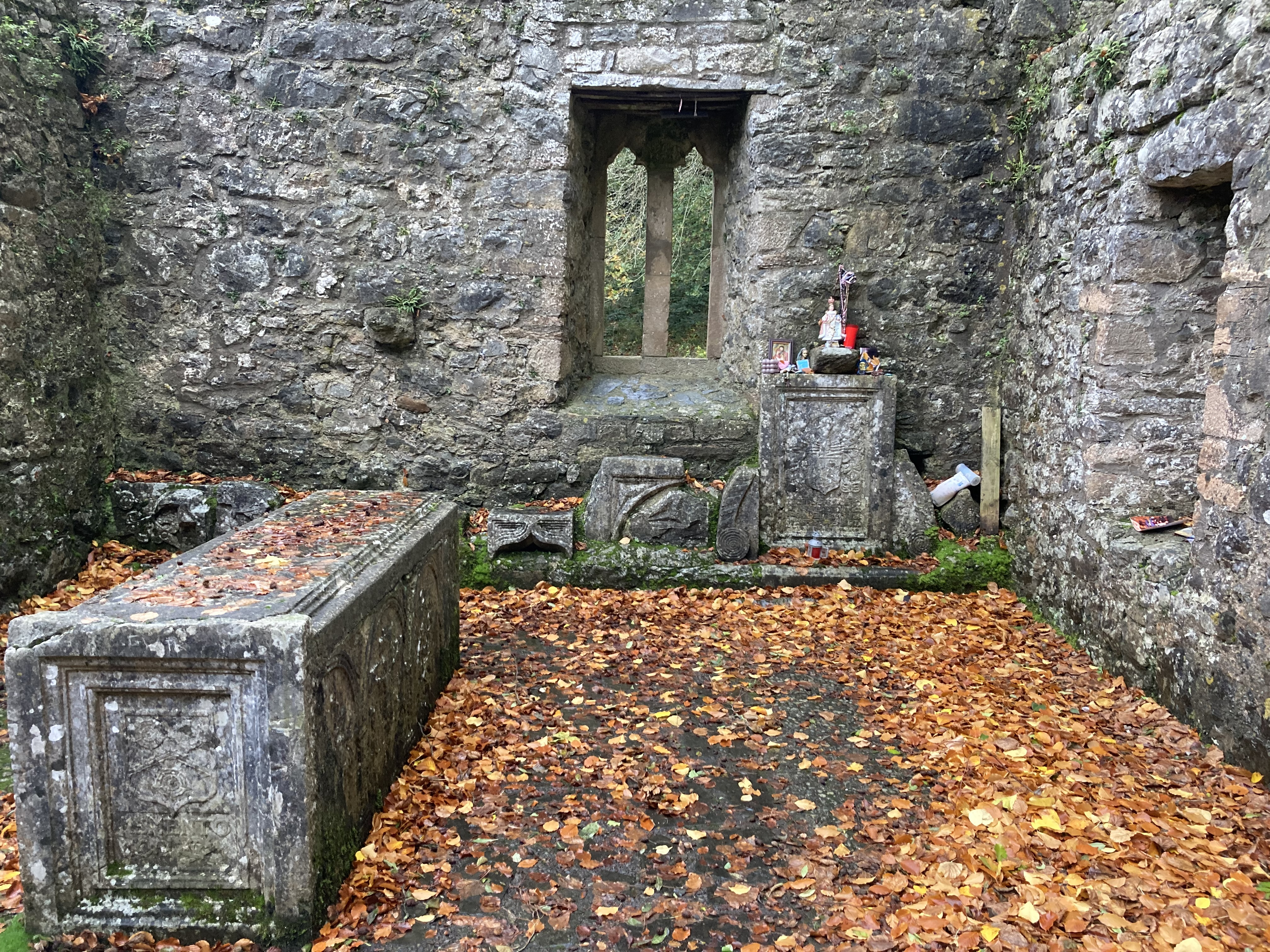
Church interior facing north

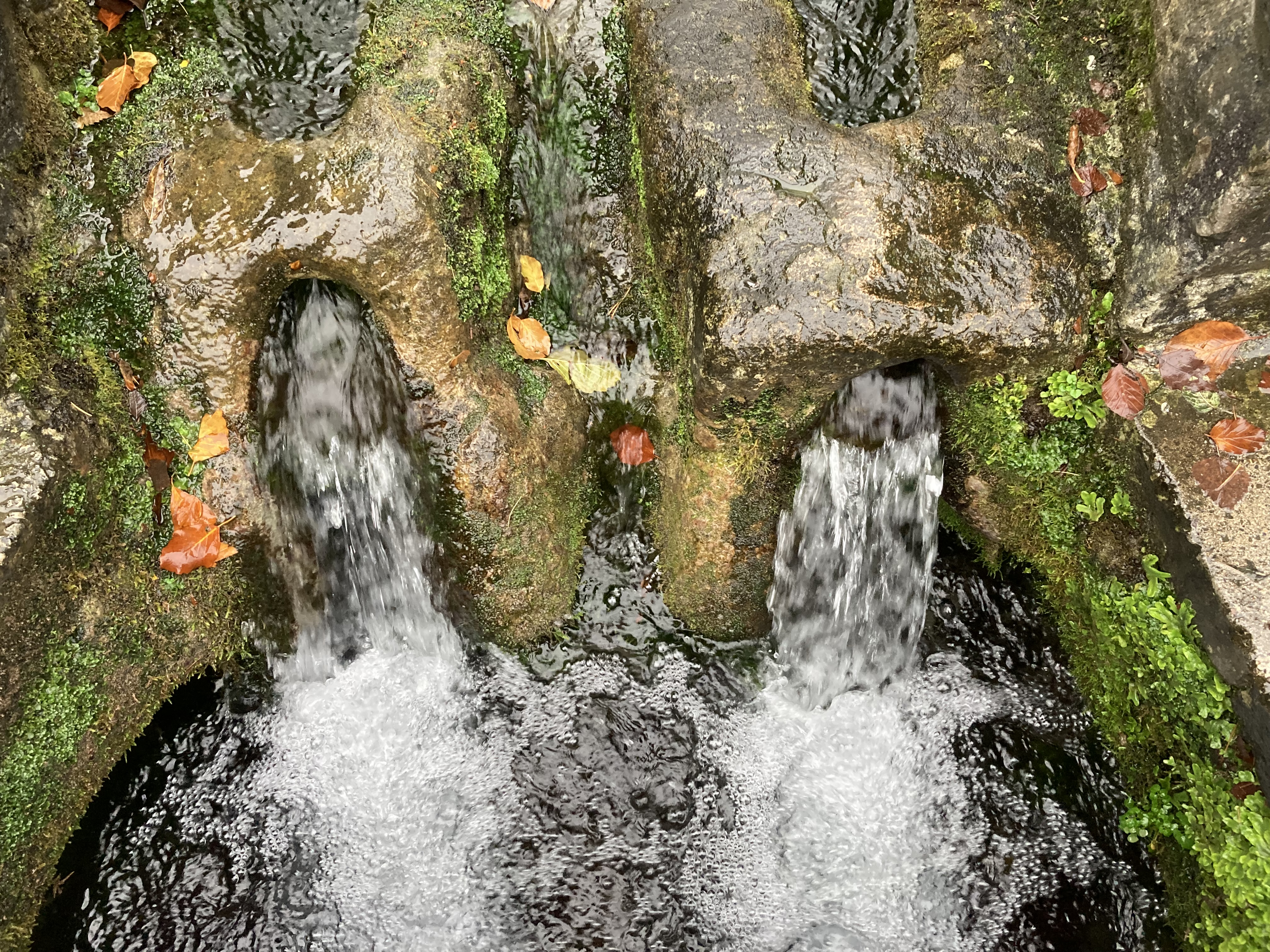
The flumes of the holy well

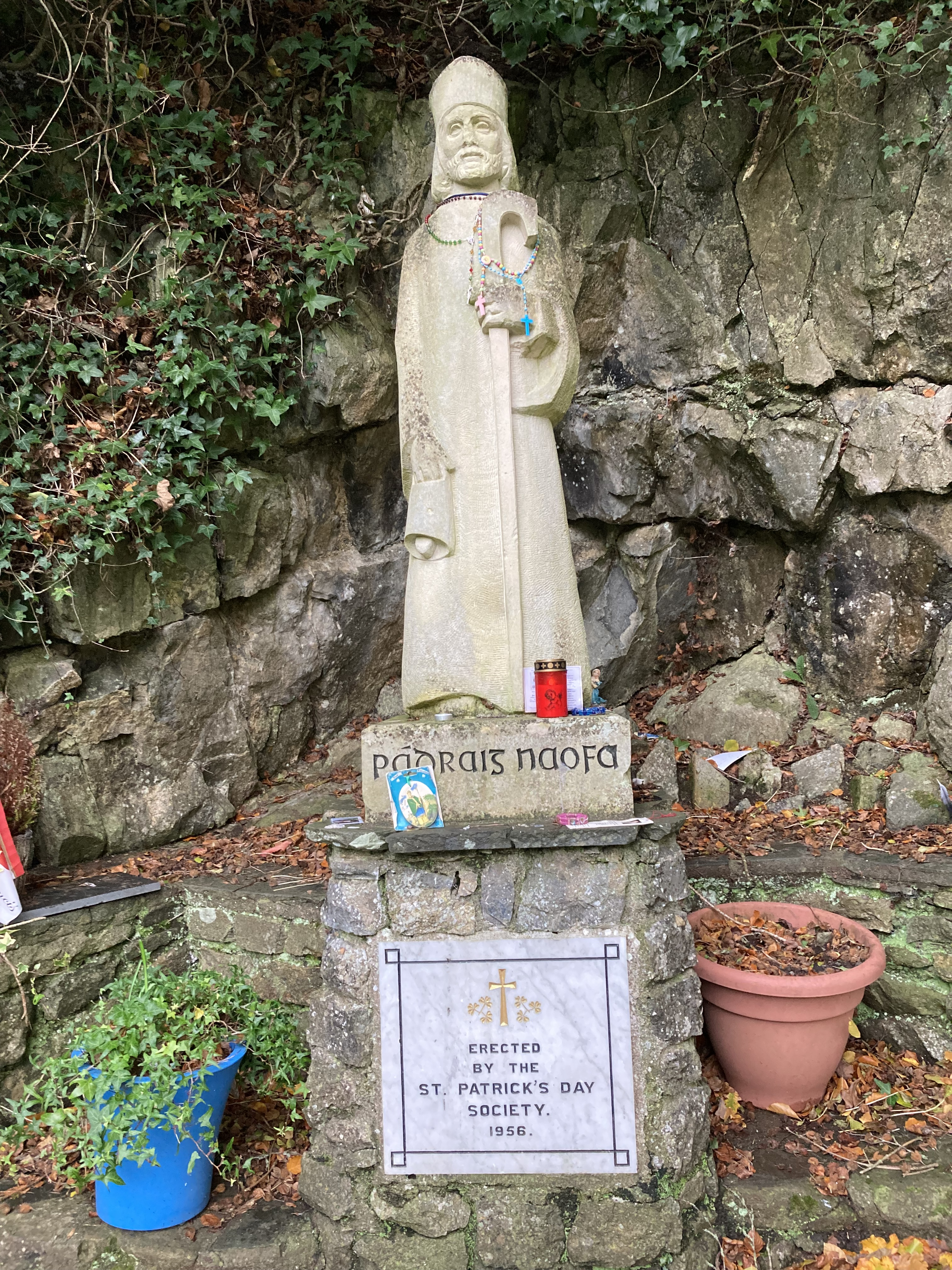
Statue of Saint Patrick, erected 1956

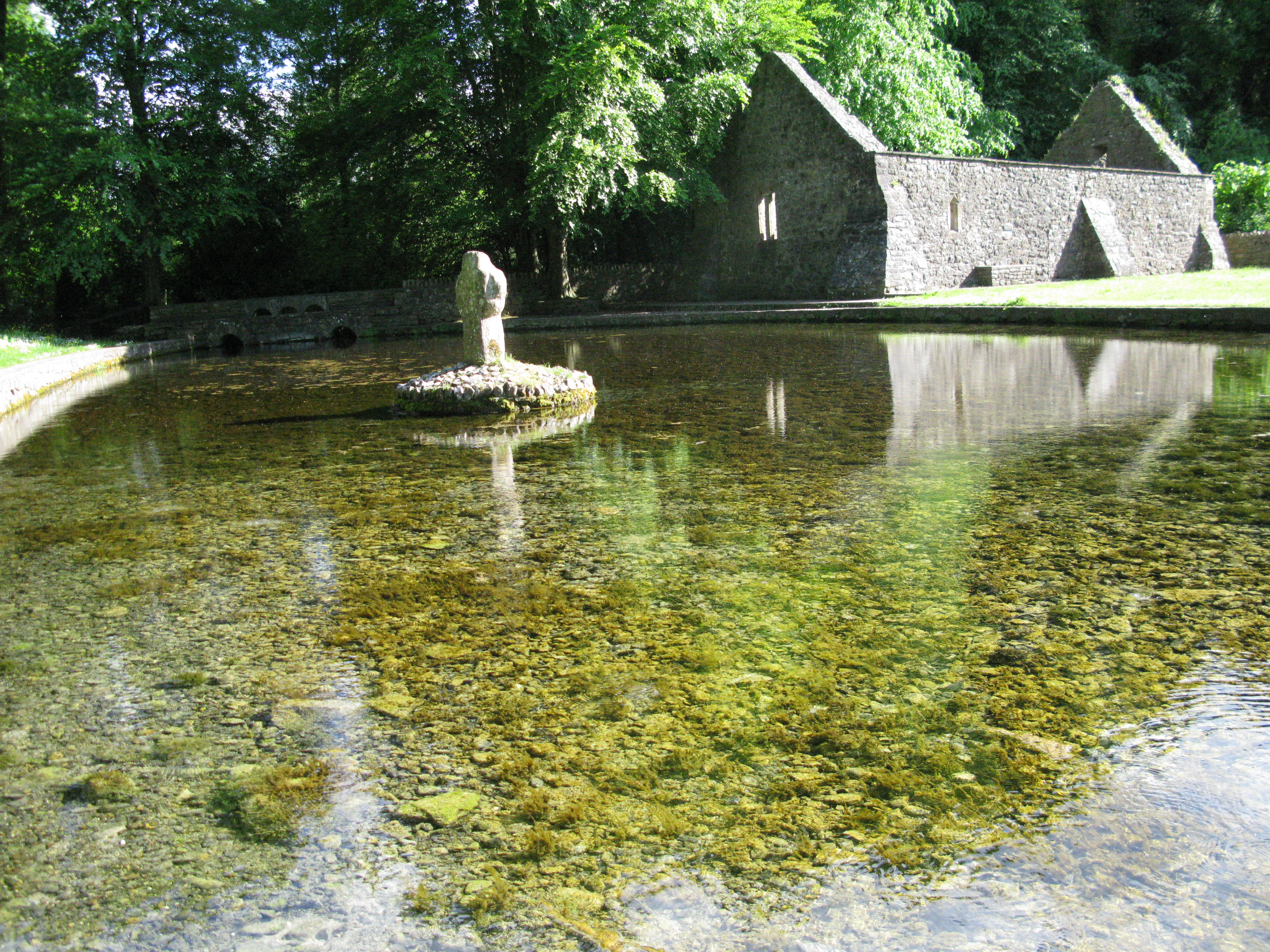
View of cross and church

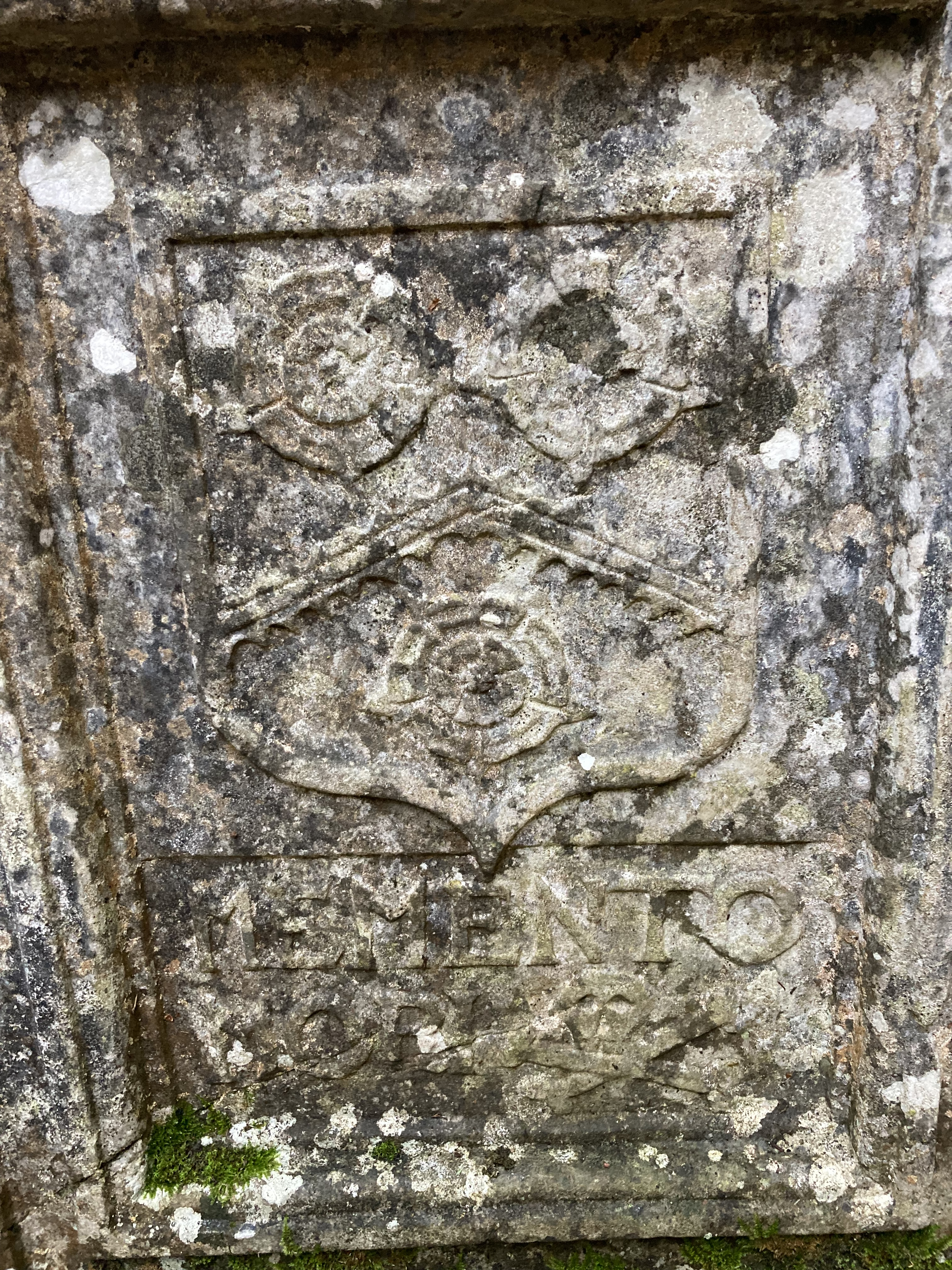
White family arms on a tomb (Party per chevron cotized, three roses - two and one), with text "Memento mori".
