= Clonmel Junction Festival =

Annual festival held in County Tipperary, Ireland

Clonmel Junction Arts Festival
- Genre: Music, visual arts, dance, comedy and theatre
- Begins: First week in July
- Frequency: Yearly
- Locations: Clonmel, Tipperary, Ireland
- Years active: 25
- Inaugurated: 2001
- Website: www.junctionfestival.com

The Clonmel Junction Festival, also known as the Clonmel Junction Arts Festival, is an annual festival held in Clonmel in Ireland. The festival, which was established in 2001, typically starts on the first weekend of July and runs for seven days. It is a multi-discipline arts festival with theatre, dance, music and visual arts. A 2009 article in The Irish Times described it as a "particularly vibrant festival", noting that it takes place in "a town with no committed performing arts venue".

== History ==
=== Early years ===
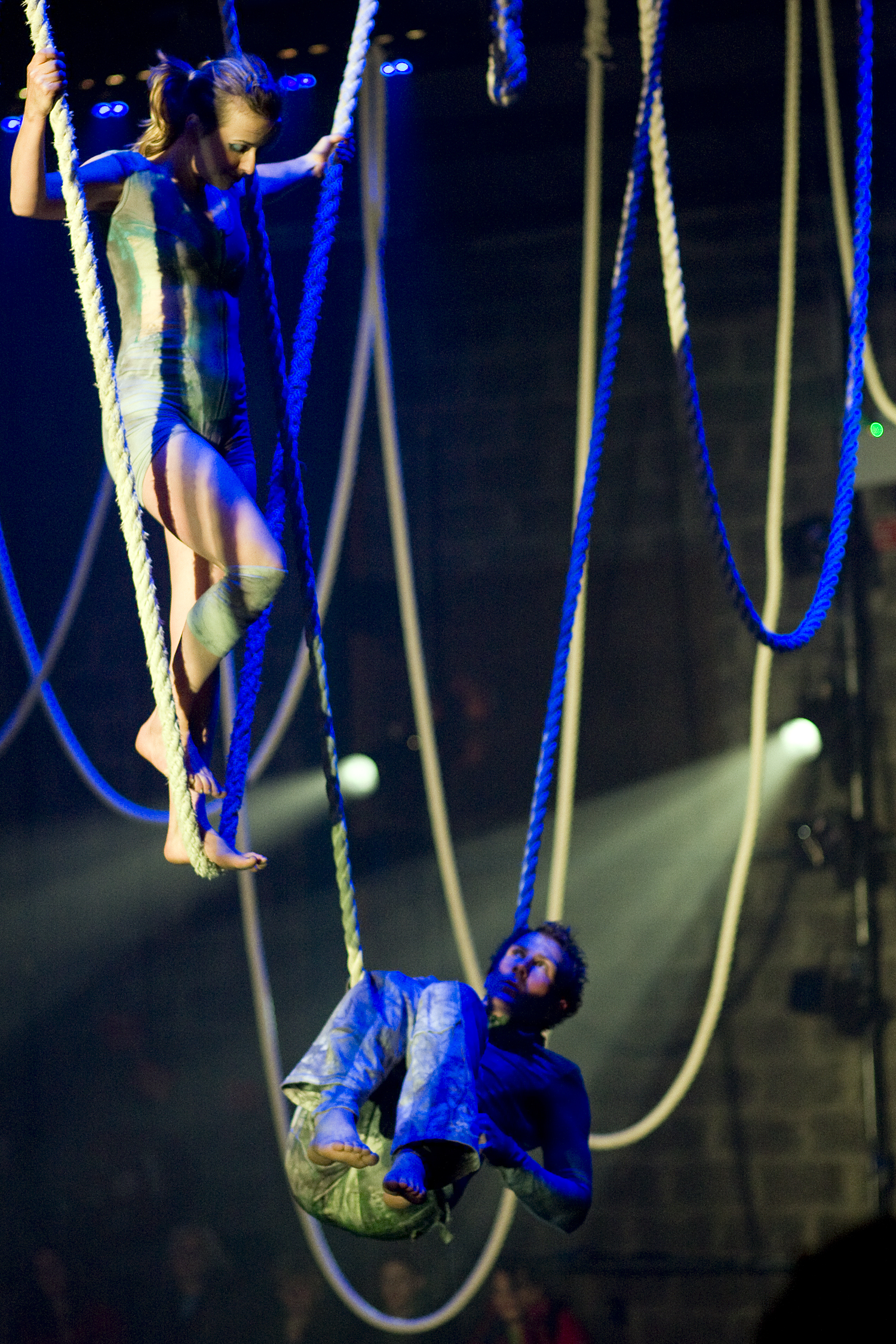
Raw by Fidget Feet, Junction (July 2008)

Clonmel Junction Festival was established in 2001 by the now defunct Galloglass Theatre Company. It featured four theatre shows, one comedy performance and a small number of traditional music performances in local pubs.

In 2002, the festival expanded its format to include rock music featuring Damien Rice and Kíla. A participation program was also introduced this year. The program involved local school children creating street art that was put on display for the duration of the festival. This subsequently became an annual program which, as of 2009, involved over 300 children every year.

=== Independence ===
2004 saw Clonmel Junction Festival became an independent organisation run by a board of directors. It expanded in 2005, increasing from a six-day event to nine-day event, with performances from KT Tunstall, Yair Dalal and Máirtín O'Connor.

2006 saw the festival bring Nofit State Circus to Clonmel for five shows. As part of the 2006 festival, there was also a celebration of newly established Polish community within Clonmel, in a mini Polish Festival.

In 2007, a collaboration was organised between Body Mind & Soul, visiting artists from Malawi and Maslow, a local band. Sensazione, an eco-theatrical fun fair, was the headline event in 2008. Along with this, several other theatre world premières took place during the nine days including 'Raw', a creation of the aerial dance company Fidget Feet in collaboration with the festival and funded by the Arts Council. There were also performances from Paul Brady and The Blizzards in 2008.

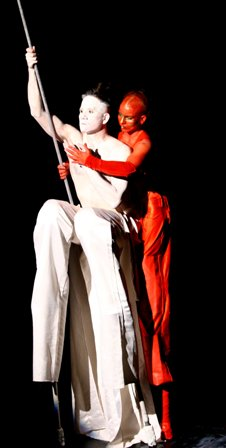
Mudfire by the Carpetbag Brigade, Junction (July 2008)

As of 2009, the festival was reportedly "attracting almost 10,000 people to its ticketed shows". The 10th Clonmel Junction Festival took place in 2010, the focus of the event shifted to circus. The festival featured circus acts from Ireland and abroad, including Fossett's Circus and Les Parfaits Inconnus. The music line up included Cathy Davey, Republic of Loose and Mick Flannery. It also featured the premiere of Me Seeing You 2, by the Iseli Chiodi Dance Company commissioned by the festival, South Tipperary Arts Office and the Excel Centre.

=== 2020s ===
Elements of the planned programme for the 20th festival, in 2020, were "presented online" owing to the response to the COVID-19 pandemic in Ireland. A specially constructed dome was used for a number of festival events in 2021. The 2024 festival was titled "Legacy X Next".
