= Mary Elizabeth Southwell Dudley Leathley =

Irish writer of children's books and religious works

- Born: Mary Elizabeth Southwell Dudley; 18 June 1818; Clonmel, County Tipperary
- Died: 22 December 1899 (aged 81); Hastings

Mary Elizabeth Southwell Dudley Leathley (18 June 1818 – 22 December 1899), was a prolific Irish writer of children's books and religious works.

== Biography ==
Leathley was born Mary Elizabeth Southwell Dudley on 18 June 1818 in Clonmel, County Tipperary. Her father was George Dudley and the family were members of the Society of Friends. Leathley was first published at sixteen and became a prolific writer. She focused on children's fiction and religious works. One of her stories sold a half million copies. Leathley married a barrister William Henry Leathley on 11 June 1847. He was catholic and Leathley converted the same year. Their son, Dudley, was raised Catholic. After living in Midhurst, Ascot and Malvern Leathley died in Hastings on 22 December 1899. Leathley's works were usually anonymous and very little is known about her life; her identity as the author was given by Lawrence Darton.

== Works ==
- Chickseed Without Chickweed (1861)
- Children of Scripture: A Sunday School Book for Youth (1866)
- The Story of Stories (1875)
- Requiescent: A Little Book of Anniversaries (1888)
