= Richard FitzRalph =

Archbishop, university administrator

Archbishop FitzRalph writing at his scriptorium. Corpus Christi College, Cambridge. MS 180, fol. 1r. By permission of the Master and Fellows of Corpus Christi College, Cambridge.

Richard FitzRalph (also Fitz Ralph; c. 1300 – 16 December 1360) was a scholastic philosopher, theologian, and Norman Irish Archbishop of Armagh during the 14th century. His thought exerted a significant influence on John Wycliffe's.

== Life ==
FitzRalph was born into a well-off burgess family of Anglo-Norman/Hiberno-Norman descent in Dundalk, Ireland. He is noted as an ex-fellow and teacher of Balliol College, at the University of Oxford in 1325 (which is the earliest known record of him). By 1331, he was a Regent master in Theology, and soon after was made Vice-Chancellor of the university; this was an almost unparalleled achievement for someone still in his early thirties, let alone an Irishman (although John Prince, in his "Worthies of Devon" makes the case for him being a Devonian and member of the Shillingford family.

As Vice-Chancellor, FitzRalph was faced with the crisis caused by the famous secession of masters and students to found a university at Stamford in Lincolnshire, and it is thought that this issue may have caused his first visit to the Papal Court at Avignon in 1334. He returned to England the following year having been appointed Dean of Lichfield — "notwithstanding that he has canonries and prebends of Crediton and Bosham, and has had provision made for him of the Chancellorship of Lincoln and the canonries and prebends of Armagh and Exeter, all of which he is to resign". In 1337 he was again compelled to visit Avignon, where he remained until 1344. On 31 July 1346, he was consecrated Archbishop of Armagh. In both of these positions, he was revered as a thoughtful and competent administrator.

From 1344, FitzRalph began to keep an account in diary form of his sermons. The shorter, less consequential ones were summarised, while the longer, more learned theological sermons were written in full. This was especially true for those he preached at Avignon. Both forms were written in Latin, and show his love of learning, shared by friends such as Richard of Bury. He is also believed to have sent many of his priests to study at Oxford to further their learning. His writings include his thoughts on infinity, predestination and free will. Like his fellow Irishmen Henry Crumpe and Dr. John Whitehead he was involved in a controversy with the Franciscan friars. He also clashed with the Archbishop of Dublin, John de St Paul, as they continued the century-old controversy over which of them had the right to claim the Primacy of Ireland.

The texts demonstrate that FitzRalph was pre-occupied with social problems in Ireland – twenty-nine sermons were given in Dundalk, Drogheda, Dublin and various places in Meath to churchmen (whom he criticised for their laxity of vocation), merchants (whom he attacked for wasteful extravagances and underhanded trading practises) and the general population, among whom he was very popular as a preacher. At a time of often hostile racial relations between the colonists and natives, he took an honourable stand in denouncing discrimination against the Gaelic Irish. At times severe, this was balanced by his very fair and serious approach as pastor of his flock, be they English, Anglo-Irish, or Gaelic.

He undertook a third visit to Avignon from 1349 to 1351, where he is believed to have participated in the negotiations between the Armenian Apostolic Church and Pope Clement VI. His report on the Black Death is the first firm evidence of its arrival in Ireland. From his return to Ireland in 1351 he became involved in what eventually became a very personal and bitter attack on various orders of mendicant friars. He wished to have their privileges withdrawn in regard to the act of confession, preaching, and other acts as they were undermining his secular clergy. As a result, he undertook a fourth visit to Avignon in 1357 to discuss the matter with Pope Innocent VI. He died there on 16 December 1360. In 1370, his remains were interred at St Nicholas's Church, Dundalk, where his memory was venerated for several centuries and miracles were reported in connection to him.

It is possible that FitzRalph was Chancellor of Oxford University in 1360.

== Writings ==
- Lectura on the Sentences
- Summa de Quaestionibus Armenorum
- Commentary on the Physics (lost)

== Sources ==
- "Latin Learning and Literature in Ireland, 1169–1500", A.B. Scott, in "A New History of Ireland", volume one, 2005.
- Biography, New Advent Catholic Encyclopedia.

Academic offices
| Preceded by Richard Kamshale | Vice-Chancellor of the University of Oxford; 1333–1336 | Succeeded by John de Ayllesbury |
| Preceded by John de Hotham | Chancellor of the University of Oxford; 1360 | Succeeded by Nicholas de Aston |
Catholic Church titles
| Preceded by David Mág Oireachtaigh | Archbishop of Armagh; 1346–1360 | Succeeded by Milo Sweetman |
