= Master Patrick of Ireland =

Master Patrick of Ireland, Irish writer, fl.14th century?

Author of 'Sophisma determinatum', which exists only in two 14th-century copies, one at the Bavarian State Library, Munich, the second at the University Library, Basel. All that is known for certain of Patrick is that he was a Paris master.

== Sources ==
- A New History of Ireland, volume one, p. 668.
