= Clonmel Town Hall =

Municipal building in County Tipperary, Ireland

- Halla Baile Chluain Meala
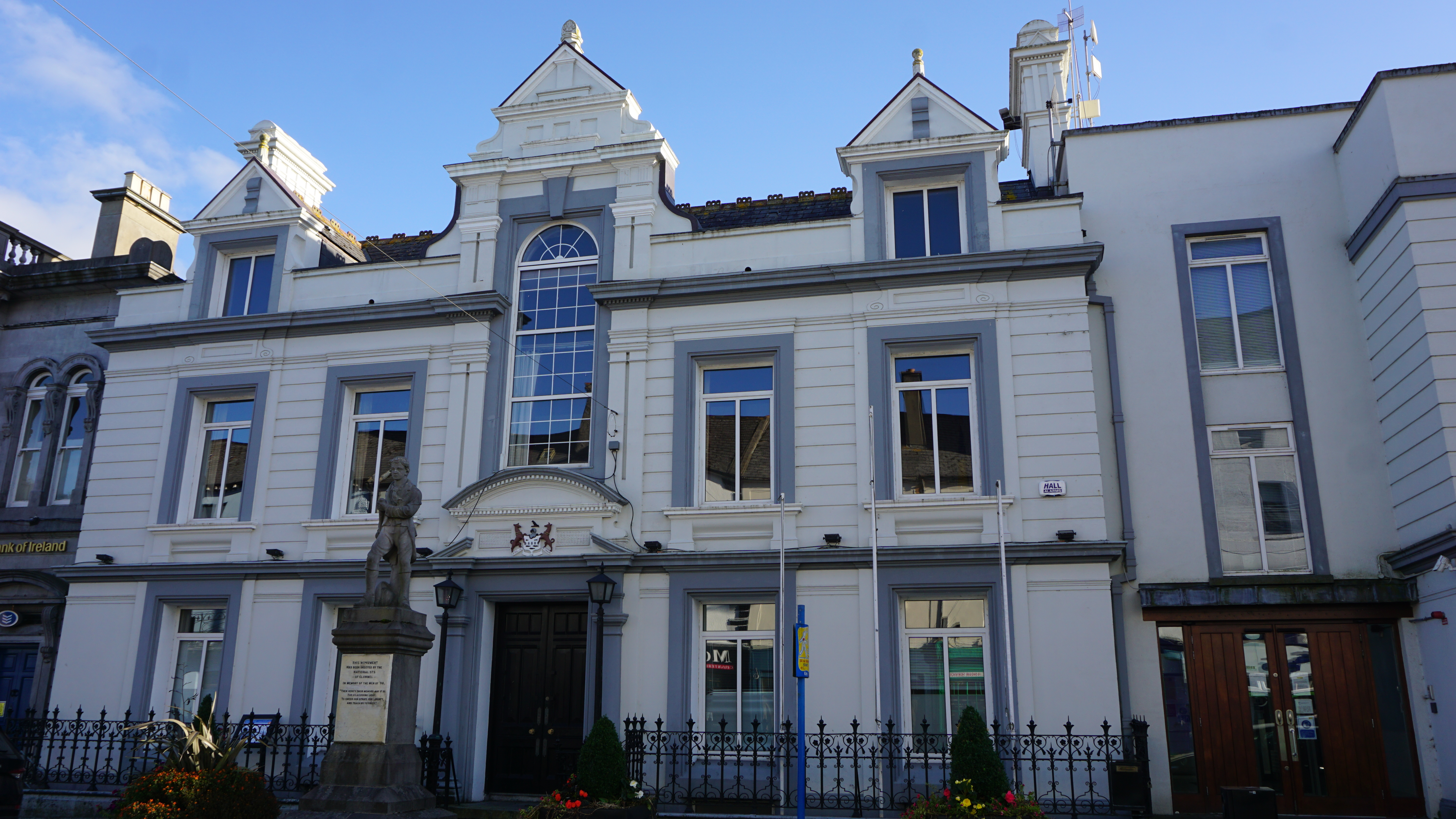
- Clonmel Town Hall

- Location within Ireland

General information
- Architectural style: Dutch Renaissance style
- Location: Parnell Street, Clonmel, Ireland
- Coordinates: 52.3533°N 7.6993°W
- Completed: 1882

Clonmel Town Hall (Irish: Halla Baile Chluain Meala) is a municipal building in Parnell Street, Clonmel, County Tipperary, Ireland. The building accommodated the offices of Clonmel Borough Council until 2014.

== History ==
In the 1870s, Clonmel Corporation decided to commission a town hall. The site they selected was occupied by a 17th century house, commissioned by a timber merchant, Richard Hamerton, which was known as Hamerton Hall, before it was converted into a public house known as the Great Globe Inn in around 1850. The corporation acquired the site and demolished the house in 1878. The new building was designed in the Dutch Renaissance style, built in brick with a cement render finish at a cost of £6,000, and was officially opened by the mayor, Edward Cantwell, on 4 January 1882.

The design involved a symmetrical main frontage of five bays facing onto Parnell Street. The central bay featured a square-headed doorway flanked by Doric order pilasters supporting a cornice, an entablature bearing the borough coat of arms and a segmental pediment. On the first floor there was a tall round headed window with an architrave and a keystone flanked by paired pilasters supporting a cornice, a gable and a finial. The other bays were fenestrated by square headed casement windows with architraves on the ground floor, and by square headed casement windows with architraves and window sills on the first floor. At attic level, the outer bays were fenestrated by dormer windows surmounted by gables and finials.

A monument, sculpted by Joseph Kevin Bracken, intended to commemorate the lives of local people who took part in the Irish Rebellion of 1798, was unveiled outside the town hall in 1904.

The building became an important venue for public events. A commissioner for education, Richard Bagwell, founded the Borstal Association of Ireland and became its first president, at a meeting in the town hall in May 1906. Also, the Labour Party was founded by James Connolly, James Larkin and William O'Brien as the political wing of the Irish Trades Union Congress at a meeting in the town hall on 28 May 1912.

The building was extended to the southwest by O'Gorman Construction to a design by S. O. P. O'Ceallachain of Limerick in 1993. The building ceased to be the local seat of government in 2014, when the council was dissolved and administration of the town was amalgamated with Tipperary County Council in accordance with the Local Government Reform Act 2014. A further programme of refurbishment works was initiated in €60,000 was initiated in March 2022. A reception was held in the town hall on 18 June 2022 to launch the 21st World Masters Mountain Running Championships, which took place in the town on 3 September 2022.
