= Expressway =

Expressway may refer to:

- Controlled-access highway, the highest-grade type of highway with access ramps, lane markings, etc., for high-speed traffic
- Limited-access road, a lower grade of highway or arterial road
- Expressway (film), a 2016 Filipino action thriller film
- Expressway, the fictional slidewalk transport system in Isaac Asimov's Robot series
