= Thomas de Hibernia =

Thomas de Hibernia (fl. 1270) was an Irish theologian.

Said to be a native of Palmerstown, County Kildare, he became a Franciscan, and Fellow of Sorbonne, Paris. In later life, he moved to Italy, dying c. 1296 in the "Convent of Aquila, in the Province of Penin."

On his death-bed, he bequeathed his books and papers to the Sorbonne, "together with six pounds for the purpose of purchasing a rent to celebrate his anniversary."

Lampen, a Franciscan, argues that Thomas Palmeranus, Thomas Hibernicus and Thomas Palmerstonus are the same person.

== Select bibliography ==
- De Christiana Religione
- De Illusionibus Daemonum
- Manipulus florum, seu Sententiae Patrum (c. 1480/1494); also published under different titles: Polyanthea novissima (1758), Thesaurus Patrum (1823), Dictionarium omnium pene Patrum artque Doctorum (1846), Flores Doctorum (1858)
- De Flores Bibliae (1568)
- Religio munda (1496; attributed to him)
