= Henry Crumpe =

Anglo-Irish Cistercian

Henry Crumpe (fl.1380–1401) was Anglo-Irish Cistercian.

== Life ==
Crumpe was an Oxford-based cleric from Ireland. He wrote sermons against John Wycliffe's views on dominion, though he was later condemned by the church as his views on the sacrament were deemed too close to Wycliffe. He is credited with terming Wycliffe's followers Lollards.

Crumpe was suspended from all teaching and disputation for a time in 1382. He then returned to Ireland, where he preached against the pastoral privileges of the mendicant friars, particularly their role as confessors. This resulted in the Dominican Bishop of Meath, William Andrew, charging Crumpe with heresy in 1385.

In 1391 Crumpe returned to Oxford, where he became reinvolved in controversy. He was brought before the King's Council and condemned by a commission including the Archbishops of York and Canterbury, in May 1392. Suspended once again, he returned to Ireland, where he recommenced his disputations against the friars. In 1401 the Pope prohibited him from preaching on the subject.

== Works ==
John Bale attributed the following works to him:

- Determinaciones scholasticae
- Contra religiosos mendicantes
- Contra objecta

== Sources ==
- A New History of Ireland, volume one.
