= List of medieval universities =

Medieval European universities

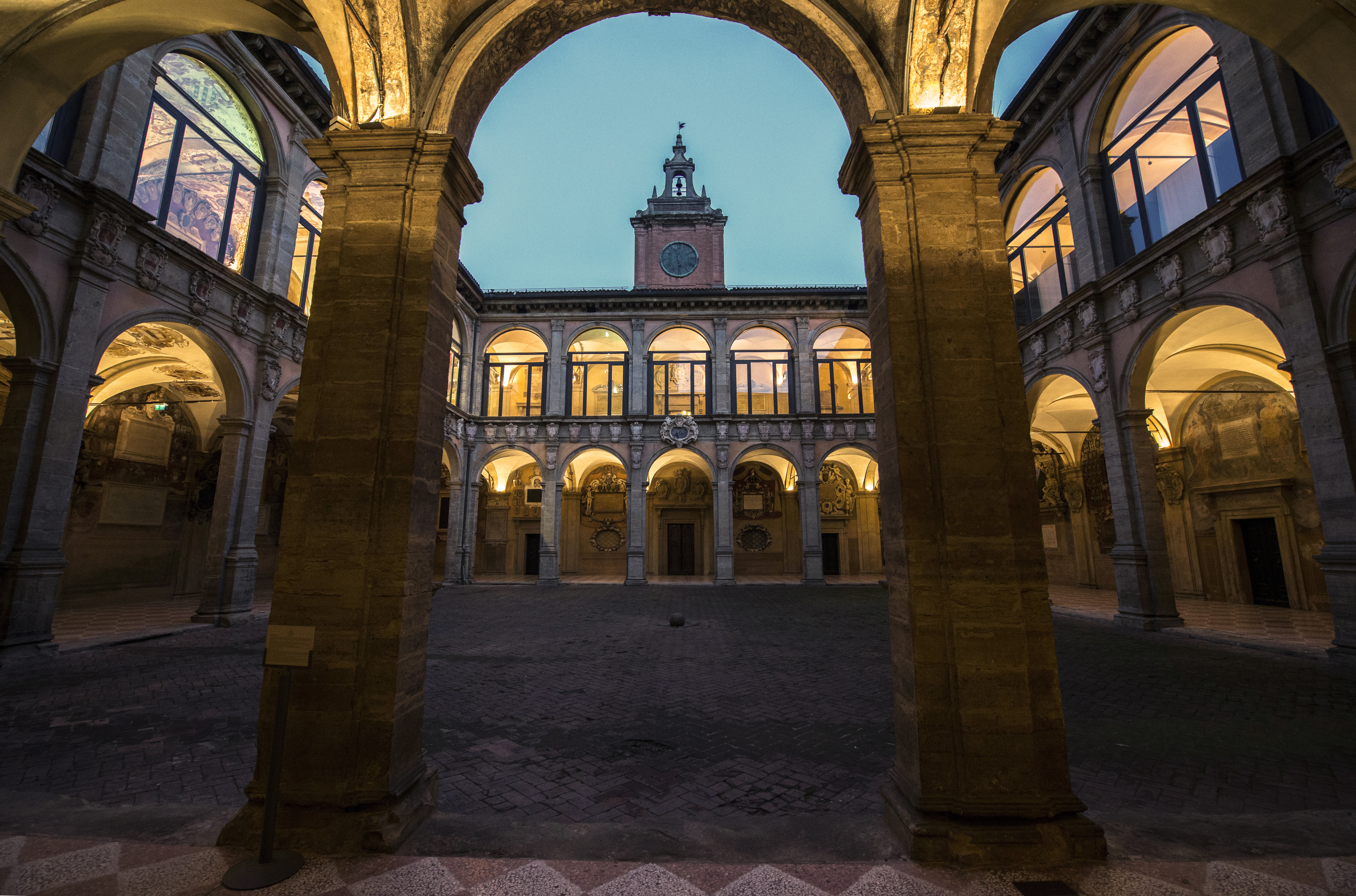
Bologna University in Italy, established in 1088 A.D., is the world's oldest university in continuous operation.

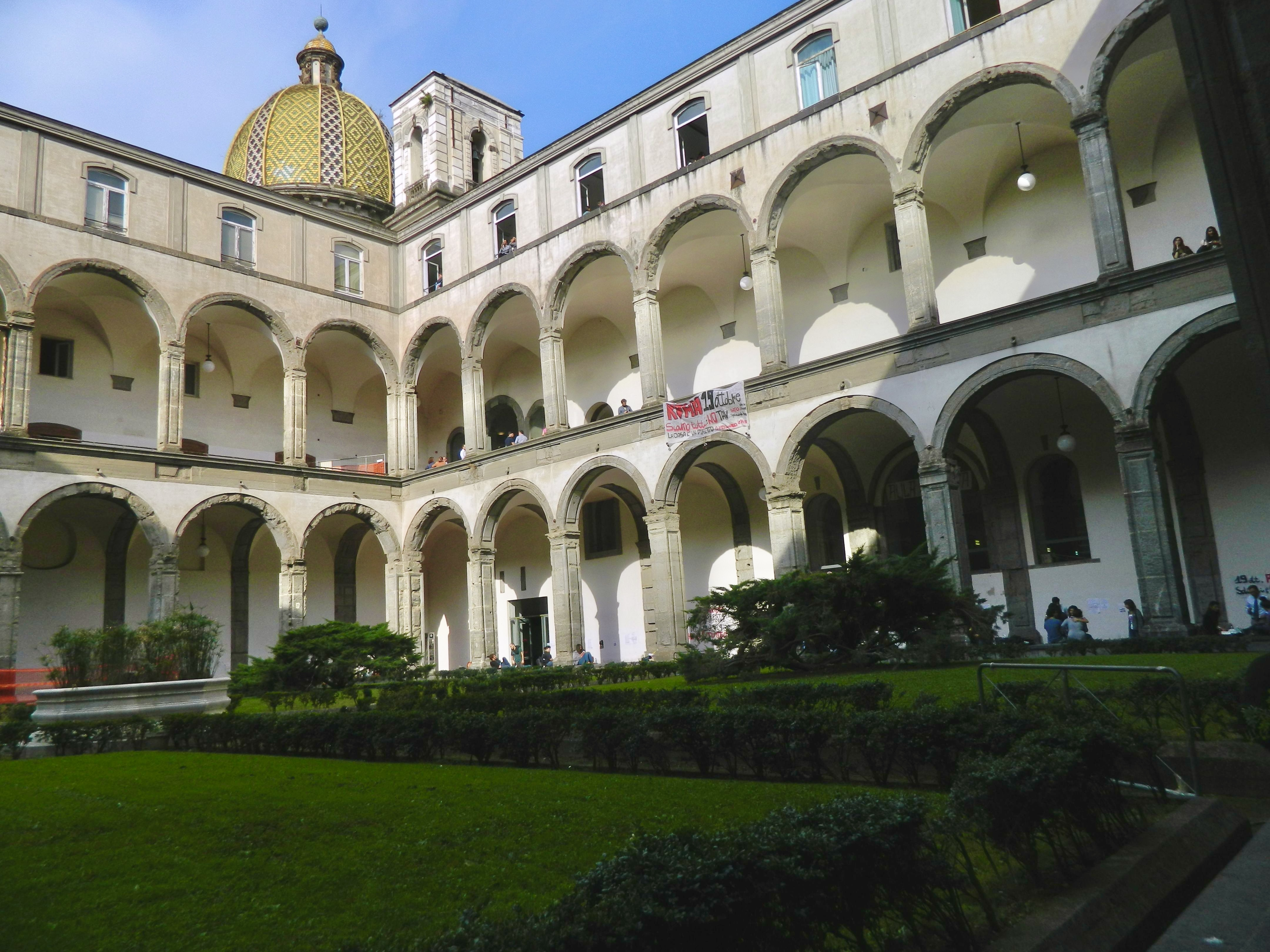
Established in 1224 by Frederick II, Holy Roman Emperor, University of Naples Federico II in Italy is the world's oldest state-funded university in continuous operation.

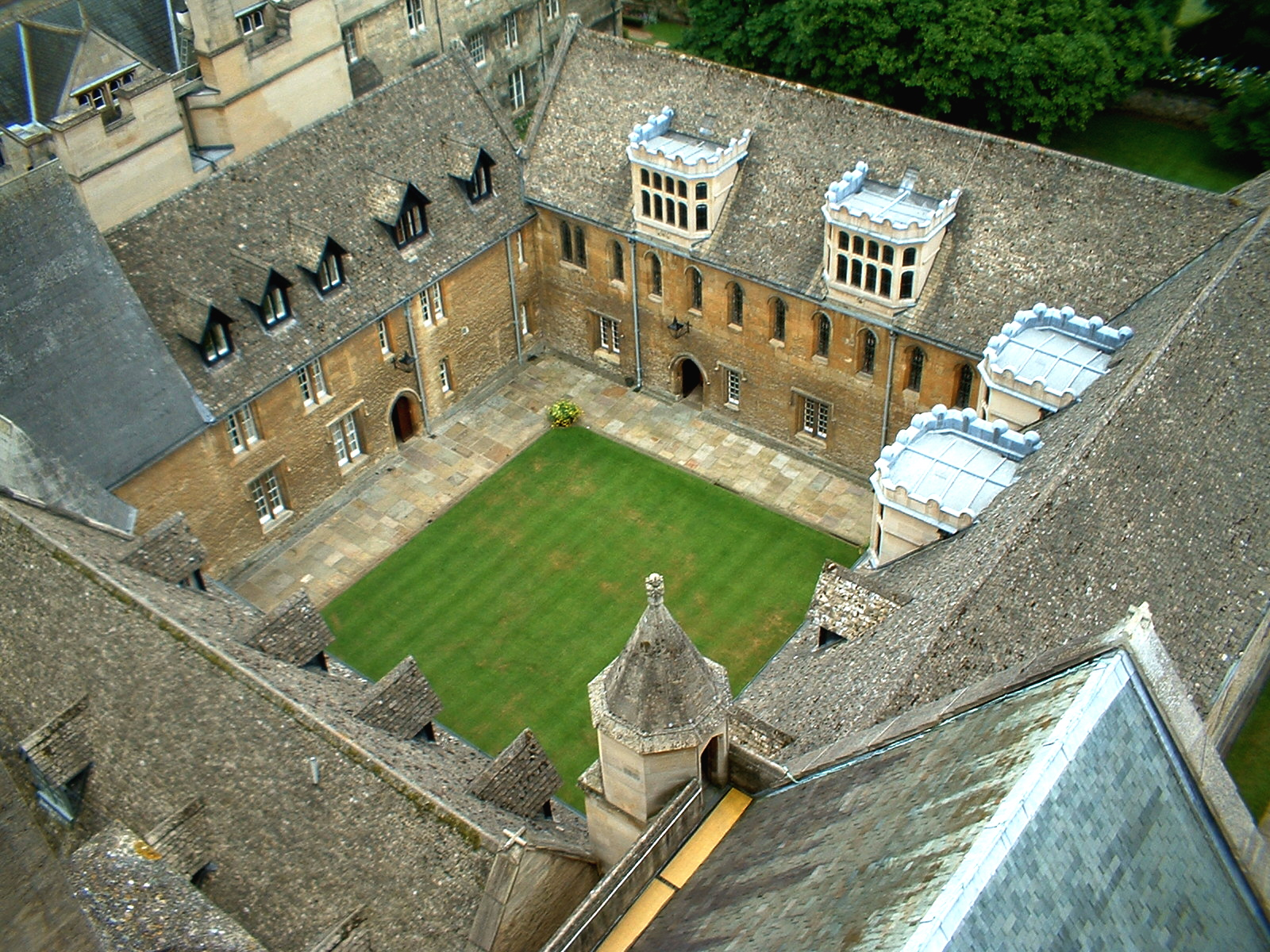
Mob Quad, late medieval quarters of Merton College, University of Oxford

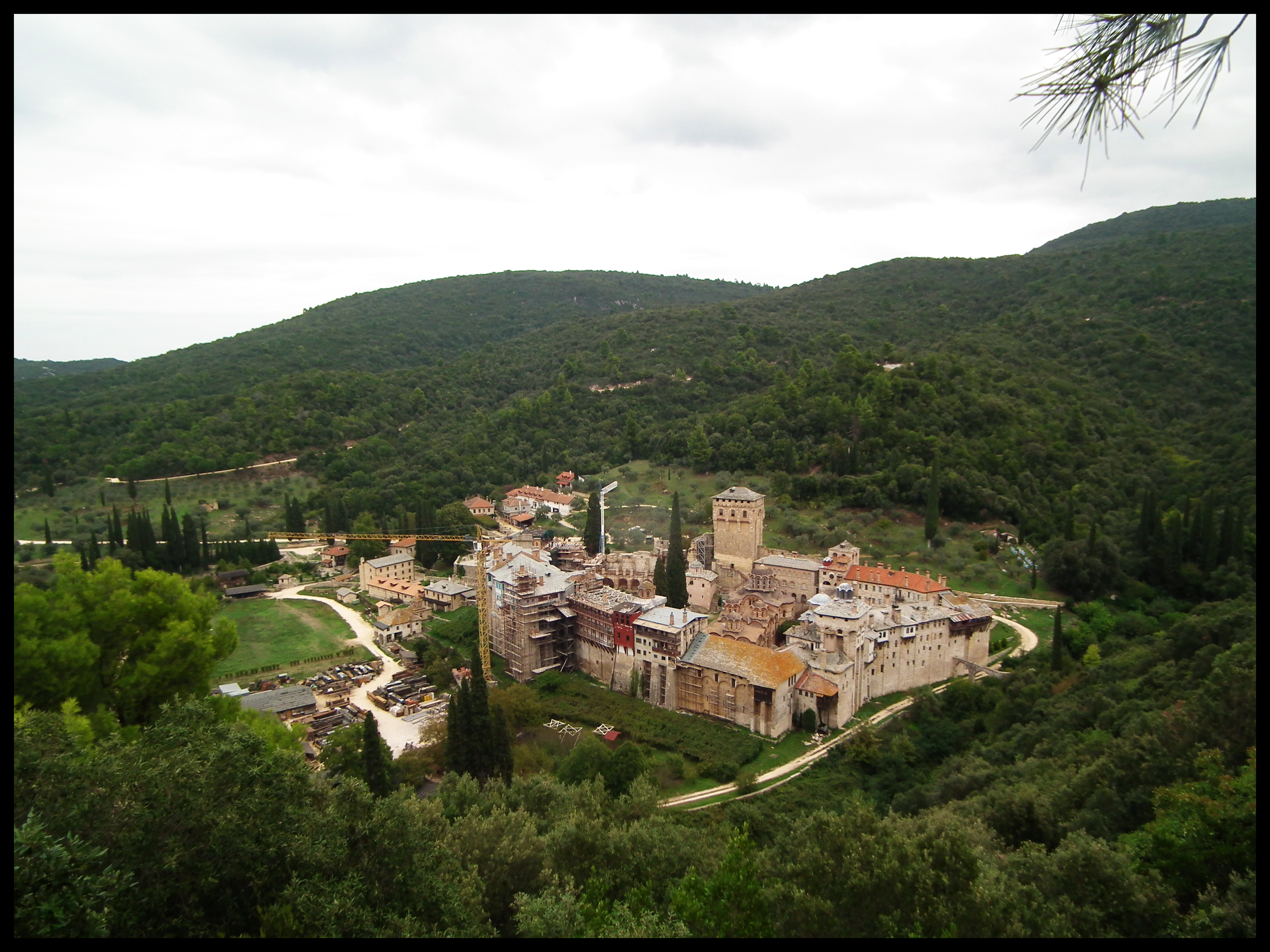
Established in 1198 by Rastko Nemanjić, Archbishop of Serbia, the Hilandar was the oldest Serbian university and hospital in the medieval Kingdom of Serbia.

The list of medieval universities comprises universities (more precisely, studia generalia) which existed in Europe during the Middle Ages. It also includes short-lived foundations and European educational institutions whose university status is a matter of debate. The degree-awarding university with its corporate organization and relative autonomy is a product of medieval Christian Europe. Before the year 1500, over eighty universities were established in Western and Central Europe. During the subsequent Colonization of the Americas the university was introduced to the New World, marking the beginning of its worldwide spread as the center of higher learning everywhere (see List of oldest universities).

== Definition ==
There were many institutions of learning (studia) in the Middle Ages in Latin Europe—cathedral schools, "schools of rhetoric" (law faculties), etc. Historians generally restrict the term "medieval university" to refer to an institution of learning that was referred to as a studium generale in the Middle Ages.

There is no official strict definition of a studium generale, the term having emerged from customary usage. The following properties were common among them, and are often treated as defining criteria:

1. It received students from everywhere (not merely the local district or region);
2. It engaged in higher learning—i.e., that it went beyond teaching the Arts, and had at least one of the higher faculties (Theology, Law or Medicine).
3. A significant part of the teaching was done by Masters (teachers with a higher degree)
4. It enjoyed the privilege of jus ubique docendi—i.e., masters of that school were entitled to teach in any other school without a preliminary examination.
5. Its teachers and students were allowed to enjoy any clerical benefices they might have elsewhere without meeting the mandatory residency requirements prescribed by Canon Law
6. It enjoyed some degree of autonomy from local civil and diocesan authorities.

Charters issued by the Pope or Holy Roman Emperor were often needed to ensure privileges 4–6. The fourth condition (teaching elsewhere without examination) was originally considered by scholars of the time to be the most important criterion, with the result that the appellation studium generale was customarily reserved to refer only to the oldest and most prestigious schools—specifically Salerno, Bologna, Paris, and sometimes Oxford—until this oligopoly was broken by papal and imperial charters in the course of the 13th century. The fifth criterion (continued benefices) was the closest there was to an "official" definition of a studium generale used by the Church and academics from the 14th century onwards, although there were some notable exceptions (e.g., neither Oxford nor Padua received this right, but they were nonetheless universally considered "Studia Generalia by custom"). Modern historians have tended to focus on the first three requirements (students from everywhere, at least one higher faculty, teaching by masters). This has led to contention in making lists of Medieval universities. Some Italian universities, for instance, were quick to obtain papal charters and thus the privileges and title of a studium generale, but their student catchment never went much beyond the local district or they had only a couple of masters engaged in teaching. Other comparable schools (notably the more prestigious cathedral schools of France), may have had wider student catchment and more masters, but neglected or failed to secure the chartered privileges and thus were never referred to as studia generalia. It is common to include the former and exclude the latter from lists of "Medieval universities", but some historians have disputed this convention as arbitrary and unreflective of the state of higher learning in Europe.

Some historians have discarded the studium generale definition, and come up with their own criteria for a definition of a "university"—narrowing it by requiring, for instance, that a university have all three higher faculties (Theology, Law, Medicine) in order to be considered a "Medieval university" (very few had all three), whereas others widen it to include some of the more prestigious cathedral schools, palace schools and universities outside of Latin Europe (notably in the Greek and Islamic world, for example the Pandidakterion founded by the Byzantine emperor Theodosius II in 425.

There is also contention on the founding dates of many universities. Using the date of acquisition of a papal and royal/imperial charter is inadequate, as the older universities, believing their status and reputations sufficient and indisputable, refused or resisted asking for an official charter for a long time. Some historians trace the founding of a university to the first date when evidence of some kind of teaching was done in that locality, even if only local and limited. Others wait until there is evidence of higher learning, a wide student catchment, the emergence of its masters teaching elsewhere or a more definitive mention of it as a studium generale.

== List ==
Ranking	Year	Name	Contemporaneous location	Current location	Notes
1	1088 (1158 charter granted)	University of Bologna	Kingdom of Italy (Holy Roman Empire)	Bologna, Italy	The first university in the sense of a higher-learning, degree-awarding institute, the word universitas having been coined at its foundation. Teaching there started much earlier since, for example, Gerard Sagredo, who was born in AD 980, learnt liberal arts there; by that time, the town already had a corporation of legis doctores and causidici
2	1045–1150 (1200 charter granted)	University of Paris	Kingdom of France	Paris, France	The school predates the foundation of the university proper and is attested in 1045 which places its founding before that. The faculty and nation system of the University of Paris (along with that of the University of Bologna) became the model for all later medieval universities. The University of Paris was known as a universitas magistrorum et scholarium (a guild of teachers and scholars), by contrast with the Bolognese universitas scholarium. The university had four faculties: Arts, Medicine, Law, and Theology. The Faculty of Arts was the lowest in rank, but also the largest as students had to graduate there to be admitted to one of the higher faculties. The students were divided into four nationes according to language or regional origin: France, Normandy, Picardy, and England. The last came to be known as the Alemannian (German) nation. Recruitment to each nation was wider than the names might imply: the English-German nation included students from Scandinavia, Central and Eastern Europe.
3	1096–1167 (1248 charter granted)	University of Oxford	Kingdom of England	Oxford, United Kingdom	"Claimed to be the oldest university in the English speaking world, there is no clear date of foundation of Oxford University, but teaching existed at Oxford in some form in 1096 and developed rapidly from 1167 when Henry II banned English students from attending the University of Paris." Teaching suspended in 1209 (owing to the town execution of two scholars) and 1355 (owing to the St Scholastica riot), but was continuous during the English Civil War (1642–1651)—the university was Royalist. All Souls College and University College have repeatedly claimed that they own documents proving that teaching in Oxford started in the year 825, but these documents have never been produced (allegedly, John Speed dated his famous 1605 Oxford maps based on these documents). However, it was not until 1254 that Pope Innocent IV granted to Oxford the university charter by papal bull ("Querentes in agro").
4	1198	University of Hilandar	Kingdom of Serbia	Serbian Orthodox Hilandar, Mount Athos, Greece	Founded in 1198 by Stefan Nemanja, King of Serbia and Saint Sava, Archbishop of Serbia, was the first and oldest Serbian university and Hospital, became a point of the Serbian academic, intellectual, educational, religious and cultural life. It was granted by chrysobull in Greek by Byzantine Emperor ("to the Serbs as an eternal gift...,") and Serbian Cyrillic by King of Serbia. It was partially closed in the end of 15th century after the fall of Byzantine Empire by Ottoman Empire. Notable members are philosopher Domentijan, translator and transcriber Grigorije, scribe Gavrilo, writer Teodosije, mechanical engineer Lazar and printer Makarije. Today was reopened as Serbian Church theology monastery.
5	1204	University of Vicenza	Commune of Vicenza	Vicenza, Italy	Laical studium generale. It closed in 1209.
6	1209 (1231 charter granted)	University of Cambridge	Kingdom of England	Cambridge, United Kingdom	Founded by scholars leaving Oxford after a dispute caused by the execution of two scholars in 1209, and royal charter was granted in 1231. The university takes 1209 as its official anniversary.
7	1212	University of Palencia	Kingdom of León	Palencia, Spain	It was the oldest Studium Generale in the Iberian Peninsula. It disappeared c. 1264, and its remains transferred to University of Valladolid.
8	1218 (probably older)	University of Salamanca	Kingdom of León	Salamanca, Spain	It is the oldest university in operation in the Hispanic world. Although there are records of the university granting degrees many years before (James Trager's People's Chronology sets its foundation date in 1134), it received the royal chart of foundation as "Estudio General" only in 1218, making it possibly the fourth or even the third oldest European university in continuous operations. However, it was the first European university to receive the title of "university" as such, granted by king of Castile and León, Alfonso X, and the Pope in 1254. Having been excluded from the university in 1852 by the Spanish government, the Faculties of Theology and Canon Law became the Pontifical University of Salamanca in 1940.
9	1222	University of Padua	Commune of Padua	Padua, Italy	Founded by scholars and professors after leaving Bologna who then worked at the University of Vicenza, which only lasted for a few years.
10	1224	University of Naples Federico II	Kingdom of Sicily	Naples, Italy	The first public university, founded by Frederick II, king of the Kingdom of Sicily.
11	1229	University of Toulouse	County of Toulouse	Toulouse, France	Founded by Raymond VII, Count of Toulouse, as a consequence of the Treaty of Paris (1229) ending the Albigensian Crusade against Catharism. The treaty marks an unofficial end to the political autonomy of the County of Toulouse, and because he was suspected of sympathizing with the heretics, Raymond VII was forced to finance the teaching of theology as a means to dissolve the heretic movement. As a consequence, the teaching was done by members of the Dominican Order, which was founded by Saint Dominic in Toulouse in 1216 to oppose heresy.
12	1235 (1306)	University of Orléans	Orléans, Duchy of Orléans, Orléanais, Kingdom of France	Orléans, France	In 1219, Pope Honorius III forbade the teaching of Roman Law in the University of Paris. Then, a number of teachers and disciples took refuge in Orléans. In 1235 Pope Gregory IX, in a bull, affirmed that teaching Roman Law was not forbidden in Orléans. Later, Pope Boniface VIII, in 1298, promulgated the sixth book of the Decretals, he appointed the doctors of Bologna and the doctors of Orléans to comment upon it. Pope Clement V also studied law and letters in Orléans and, by a papal bull published at Lyon, 27 January 1306, he endowed the Orléans institutes with the title and privileges of a university.
13	1240	University of Siena	Republic of Siena	Siena, Italy	Originally called Studium Senese, was founded by Commune of Siena in 1240. In 1321, the studium was able to attract a larger number or pupils owing to a mass exodus from the prestigious University of Bologna. Closed temporarily in 1808–1815 when Napoleonic forces occupied Tuscany. On 7 November 1990 the university celebrated its 750th anniversary.
14	1241	University of Valladolid	Kingdom of Castile	Valladolid, Spain	One hypothesis is that its foundation is the result of the transfer of Palencia's studium generale between 1208 and 1241 by Alfonso VIII, king of Castile, and Bishop Tello Téllez de Meneses.
18	1220 (1289)	University of Montpellier	Lordship of Montpellier, Kingdom of Majorca	Montpellier, France	A bull issued by Pope Nicholas IV in 1289, combined all the long-existing schools, since 1160, into a university. The first statutes were given by Conrad of Urach in 1220.
19	1290	University of Macerata	Papal States	Macerata, Italy	The University of Macerata (Italian: Università degli Studi di Macerata) was founded in 1290, organized into seven faculties.
20	1290	University of Coimbra	Kingdom of Portugal	Coimbra, Portugal	Began its existence in Lisbon with the name Studium Generale (Portuguese: Estudo Geral). Scientiae thesaurus mirabilis, the royal charter announcing the institution of the university, was dated 1 March of that year, although efforts had been made at least since 1288 to create this first university in Portugal. The papal confirmation was also given in 1290 (on 9 August of that year), during the papacy of Pope Nicholas IV.
21	1293	University of Alcalá	Crown of Castile	Alcalá de Henares, Spain	The University of Alcalá was founded by King Sancho IV of Castile as Studium Generale in 1293 in Alcalá de Henares. It was granted university status in a papal bull in 1499, and quickly gained international fame thanks to the patronage of Cardinal Cisneros and the production of the Complutensian Polyglot Bible in 1517, which is the basis for most of the current translations. The university moved to Madrid in 1836 by royal decree. The Moyano Law of 1857 established Complutense as the sole university in Spain authorized to confer the title of doctor on any scholar. This law remained in effect until 1969.
22	1300	University of Lleida	Principality of Catalonia	Lleida, Spain	Founded in 1300 as Estudi General, after a 1297 granting papal bull. It was closed down in 1717 along with the banning of the rest of Catalan universities and the original political institutions of Catalonia. Refounded on 12 December 1991.
23	1303	La Sapienza University of Rome	Papal States	Rome, Italy	Founded by Pope Boniface VIII, but became a state university in 1870. According to the Catholic Encyclopaedia, the university "remained closed during the entire pontificate of Clement VII".
24	1303	University of Avignon	County of Provence	Avignon, France	Founded by Pope Boniface VIII during the Avignon Papacy, as part of his efforts to establish educational institutions in the city. It initially focused on theology, law, and the humanities, with the papacy's influence ensuring its prominence. The university's medieval history was closely tied to the Church, contributing to its role as a major intellectual center in southern France during the Middle Ages.
25	1308	University of Perugia	Papal States	Perugia, Italy	Attested by the Bull of Pope Clement V. On 19 May 1355, the Emperor Charles IV, Holy Roman Emperor issued a bull confirming the papal erection and raising it to the rank of an imperial university.
26	1320	University of Dublin	Lordship of Ireland	Dublin, Ireland	Papal brief granted by Pope Clement V in 1311 to John de Leche, Archbishop of Dublin, but it was not acted on until his successor, Alexander de Bicknor, issued an instrument establishing the university in 1320. The university had power to confer degrees, and three doctors of theology were appointed. It was based at St Patrick's Cathedral. The university struggled to attract benefactors and disappeared at the time of the Reformation (1530s). It has no relation to the current University of Dublin, which was founded in 1592.
27	1321	University of Florence	Republic of Florence	Florence, Italy	The University of Florence evolved from the Studium Generale established by the Florentine Republic in 1321. The studium was recognized by Pope Clement VI in 1349.
28	1336	University of Camerino	Papal States	Camerino, Italy	The great poet and jurist Cino da Pistoia, living in Marche in the years 1319–1321, and in Camerino in the spring of 1321, remembers the territory blooming with juridical schools. Camerino had been a center of learning since no later than 1200, offering degrees in civil law, canonical law, medicine, and literary studies. Gregory XI took the decision upon the request of Gentile III da Varano with the papal edict of 29 January 1377, directed to the commune and to the people, authorizing Camerino to confer (after appropriate examination) bachelor and doctoral degrees with apostolic authority.
29	1339	University of Grenoble	Dauphiné	Grenoble, France	The university was founded in 1339 by Dauphin Humbert II of Viennois and Pope Benedict XII to teach civil and canon law, medicine, and the liberal arts.
30	1343	University of Pisa	Republic of Pisa	Pisa, Italy	It was formally founded on 3 September 1343, by an edict of Pope Clement VI, although there had been lectures on law in Pisa since the 11th century. Today it is one of the most important universities in Italy.
31	1348	Charles University of Prague	Kingdom of Bohemia	Prague, Czech Republic	Three of four faculties closed in 1419, joined with Jesuit university and renamed Charles-Ferdinand University in 1652, split into Czech and German parts in 1882. The Czech branch temporarily closed during the Nazi occupation (1939–1945), and the German branch definitively closed in 1945.
32	1349	University of Perpignan	Principality of Catalonia	Perpignan, France	Founded in 1349 by Peter IV of Aragon, it was closed in 1794. Refounded in 1971, and in 1979 as independent university with the name Université de Perpignan Via Domicia.
33	1356	University of Angers	Duchy of Anjou, Kingdom of France	Angers, France	Founded in 1356, closed down in 1793, and re-established in 1971. By 1080, the Studium or the School of Angers was already a renowned scholarly institution. It received the title "university" in 1356, and in 1364, Charles V granted the university its autonomy and privileges.
34	1361	University of Pavia	House of Visconti	Pavia, Italy	Closed for short periods during the Italian Wars, Napoleonic wars, and Revolutions of 1848.
35	1364	Jagiellonian University	Kingdom of Poland	Kraków, Poland	Founded by Casimir the Great under the name Studium Generale, it was commonly referred to as the Kraków Academy. The institution's development stalled upon the king's death in 1370, owing primarily to a lack of funding. The academy lacked a permanent location, so lectures were held across the city at various churches and in the Kraków Cathedral School. Further development again resumed in the 1390s, by the initiative of King Władysław Jagiełło and his wife Jadwiga of Poland; at which point the school became a fully functioning university with a permanent location. The university was forcibly shut down during the German Occupation of Poland (1939–1945). The staff was deported to Nazi concentration camps, and many of its collections were deliberately destroyed by the occupying German authorities. Within a month after the city's liberation, the university again reopened with some of the original pre-war staff who survived the occupation.
36	1365	University of Vienna	Holy Roman Empire	Vienna, Austria	Modeled on the University of Paris.
37	1367	University of Pécs	Kingdom of Hungary	Pécs, Hungary	The first Hungarian university was founded by the Hungarian king Louis the Great (Nagy Lajos), in 1367 in Pécs.
38	1379	University of Erfurt	Holy Roman Empire	Erfurt, Germany	Disestablished 1816 and reopened 1994. The first universities founded in the German-speaking world were Prague (1348), Vienna (1365), and Erfurt (1379). The University of Erfurt claims to be the oldest university in what is present day Germany, although it was closed for 178 years. Heidelberg University (founded 1386, before actual teaching started in Erfurt) also claims to be Germany's oldest university.
40	1386	Ruprecht Karl University of Heidelberg	Holy Roman Empire	Heidelberg, Germany	Founded by Rupert I, Elector Palatine.
41	1388	University of Cologne	Holy Roman Empire	Cologne, Germany	Founded by the city council of the Free City of Cologne. Pope Urban VI granted a university charter in the year of foundation. Closed in 1798, refounded in 1919.
42	1391	University of Ferrara	House of Este	Ferrara, Italy	Founded by Marquis Alberto d'Este.
43	1395	University of Óbuda	Kingdom of Hungary	Óbuda, Hungary	Founded by the Hungarian king Sigismund of Luxembourg. On 6 October 1395 Pope Boniface IX signed Óbuda University’s first deed of foundation on the Hungarian king’s, Sigismund of Luxemburg’s request, thus this university became the country’s second and the capital’s first university.
44	1396	University of Zadar	Kingdom of Croatia and Dalmatia	Zadar, Croatia	Founded by Raimund de Vineis.
45	1404	University of Turin	Duchy of Savoy	Turin, Italy	Founded by the Prince Louis of Piedmont during the reign of Amadeus VIII.
46	1409	University of Leipzig	Holy Roman Empire	Leipzig, Germany	Founded when German-speaking staff left Prague due to the Jan Hus crisis.
47	1409	University of Provence	County of Provence	Aix-en-Provence/Marseille, France	Founded as a studium generale by Louis II of Anjou, Count of Provence, and recognized by a papal bull issued by the Pisan Antipope Alexander V.
48	1413	University of St Andrews	Kingdom of Scotland	St Andrews, United Kingdom	Founded by a papal bull
49	1419	University of Rostock	Holy Roman Empire	Rostock, Germany	During the Reformation, "the Catholic university of Rostock closed altogether and the closure was long enough to make the re-founded body feel a new institution".
50	1423	Université de Besançon	Duchy of Burgundy	Dole/Besançon, France	Founded by Philippe le Bon, Duke of Burgundy.
51	1425	University of Leuven	Duchy of Brabant	Leuven, Belgium	Founded by a papal bull.
52	1432	University of Caen	Kingdom of England	Caen, France	Founded by John of Lancaster, 1st Duke of Bedford, during the period of English control of Normandy during the Hundred Years' War. When the French regained control of Normandy the university was recognized by French King Charles VII.
53	1434	University of Catania	Kingdom of Sicily	Catania, Italy	The oldest in Sicily. Founded by Alfonso V.
54	1441	University of Bordeaux	Kingdom of England	Bordeaux, France	Founded by a papal bull.
55	1446	University of Girona	Principality of Catalonia	Girona, Spain	Founded by Alfonso V of Aragon (known as King Alfonso the Magnanimous) in 1446, when he granted the privilege of teaching degrees in grammar, rhetoric, philosophy, theology, law and medicine in the city of Girona, which led to the creation of the General Studies ("Estudis Generals").
56	1450	University of Barcelona	Principality of Catalonia	Barcelona, Spain	Founded by Alfonso V of Aragon as Estudi general de Barcelona after the unification of all university education. For forty-nine years before that foundation, however, the city had had a fledgling medical school founded by King Martin of Aragon, and in the 13th century Barcelona already possessed several civil and ecclesiastical schools.
57	1451	University of Glasgow	Kingdom of Scotland	Glasgow, United Kingdom	Founded by a papal bull.
58	1453	Istanbul University	Ottoman Empire	Istanbul, Turkey	Founded by Mehmed II on May 30, 1453, a day after the conquest of Constantinople as a school of philosophy, medicine, law and letters.
59	1456	University of Greifswald	Holy Roman Empire	Greifswald, Germany	Teaching had started by 1436. Founded by initiative of Heinrich Rubenow, Lord Mayor of Greifswald (and first rector), with approval of Pope Callixtus III and Frederick III, Holy Roman Emperor, under the protection of Wartislaw IX, Duke of Pomerania. Teaching paused temporarily during the Protestant Reformation (1527–39).
60	1457	Freiburg (im Breisgau)		Germany	Teaching started in 1460 (three weeks after the opening of the nearby University of Basel with which it was competing at the time.
60	1459	Basel	City of Basel, located in the Holy Roman Empire, part of the Swiss Confederation after 1501	Switzerland	Established by papal bull in 1459, the university started teaching in 1460 and has never interrupted its activities since. The Protestant Reformation triggered a crisis during which the university lost part of the students and faculty to its neighbouring rival in Freiburg-im-Breisgau.
61	1459	Ingolstadt	Moved to Landshut in 1800 and to Munich as LMU Munich in 1826	Germany	Place where Illuminati were founded by professor Adam Weishaupt in 1776
62	1460	Nantes		France	
63	1464	Bourges		France	
64	1465	Universitas Istropolitana	Pressburg, Kingdom of Hungary	Bratislava, Slovakia	Founded by king Matthias Corvinus
65	1470	Venice		Italy	
66	1471	Genoa		Italy	
67	1474	Zaragoza	Kingdom of Aragon	Spain	
68	1476	Mainz		Germany	
69	1477	Tübingen		Germany	
70	1477	Uppsala		Sweden	
71	1479	Copenhagen		Denmark	
72	1483	Palma, Majorca	Kingdom of Majorca	Spain	
73	1485	Toledo	Crown of Castile	Spain	On 3 May 1485 Pope Innocencio III established by papal bull. The university started teaching in 1485 and interrupted its activities since 1845. Refounded in 1969.
74	1489	Sigüenza	Crown of Castile	Spain	
75	1495	University of Santiago de Compostela	Kingdom of Galicia	Crown of Castile	The university traces its roots back to 1495, when a school was opened in Santiago. In 1504, Pope Julius II approved the foundation of the university.
76	1495	University of Aberdeen	Kingdom of Scotland	Aberdeen, United Kingdom	Founded by a papal bull.
77	1498	Viadrina European University	Frankfurt on the Oder	Germany	
78	1499	Valencia	Kingdom of Valencia	Spain	

== See also ==
- History of European research universities
- List of universities and colleges in Europe
- List of oldest universities in continuous operation

== Sources ==
- Roberts, John; Rodriguez Cruz, Agueda M.; Herbst, Jürgen: "Exporting Models", in: Ridder-Symoens, Hilde de (ed.): A History of the University in Europe. Vol. II: Universities in Early Modern Europe (1500–1800), Cambridge University Press, 1996, ISBN 0-521-36106-0, pp. 256–284
- Rüegg, Walter: "Foreword. The University as a European Institution", in: Ridder-Symoens, Hilde de (ed.): A History of the University in Europe. Vol. I: Universities in the Middle Ages, Cambridge University Press, 1992, ISBN 0-521-36105-2, pp. XIX–XX
