= List of modern universities in Europe (1801–1945) =

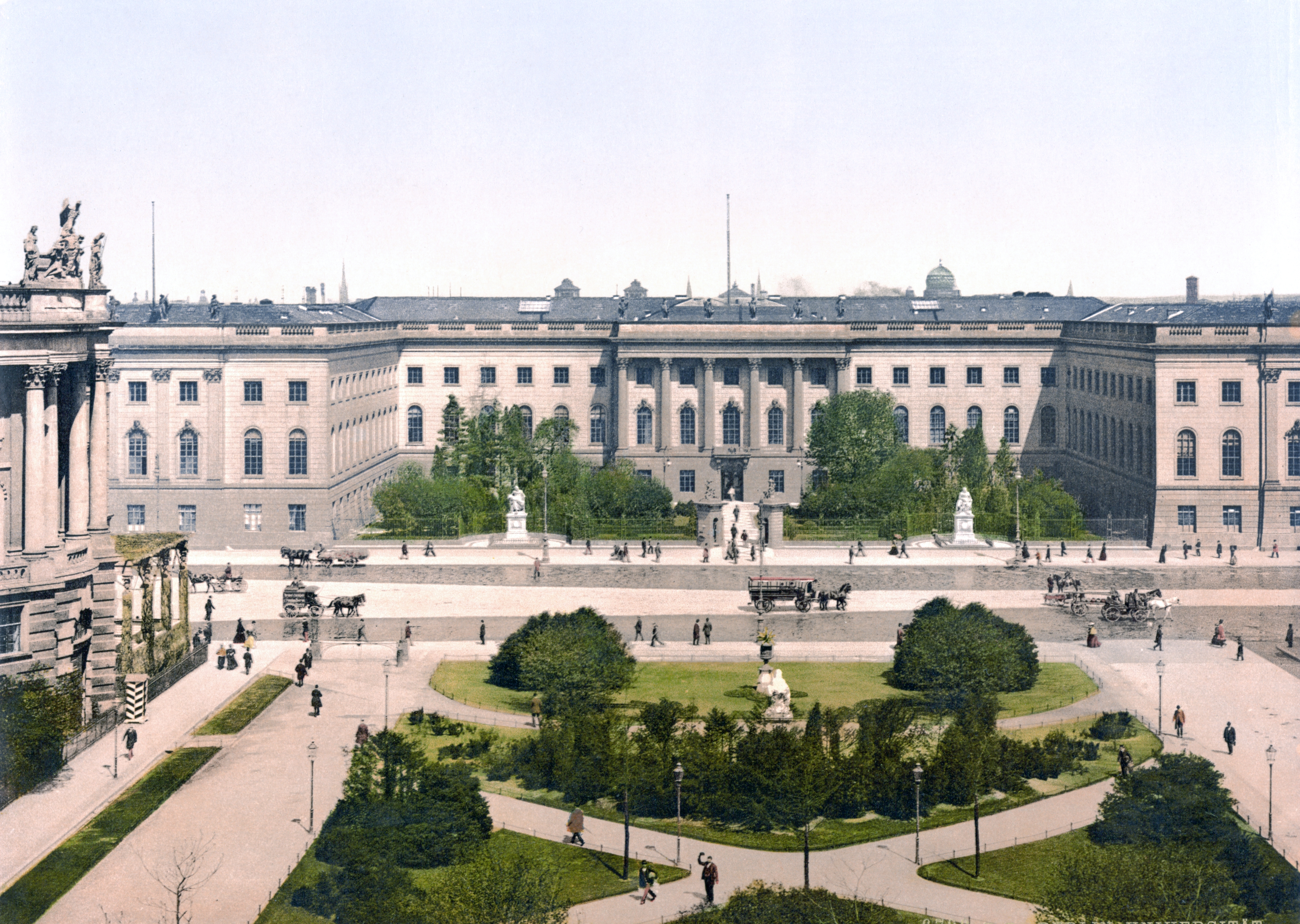
Humboldt University, founded in Berlin in 1810, was a much emulated model of a modern university in the 19th century (photochrom from 1900).

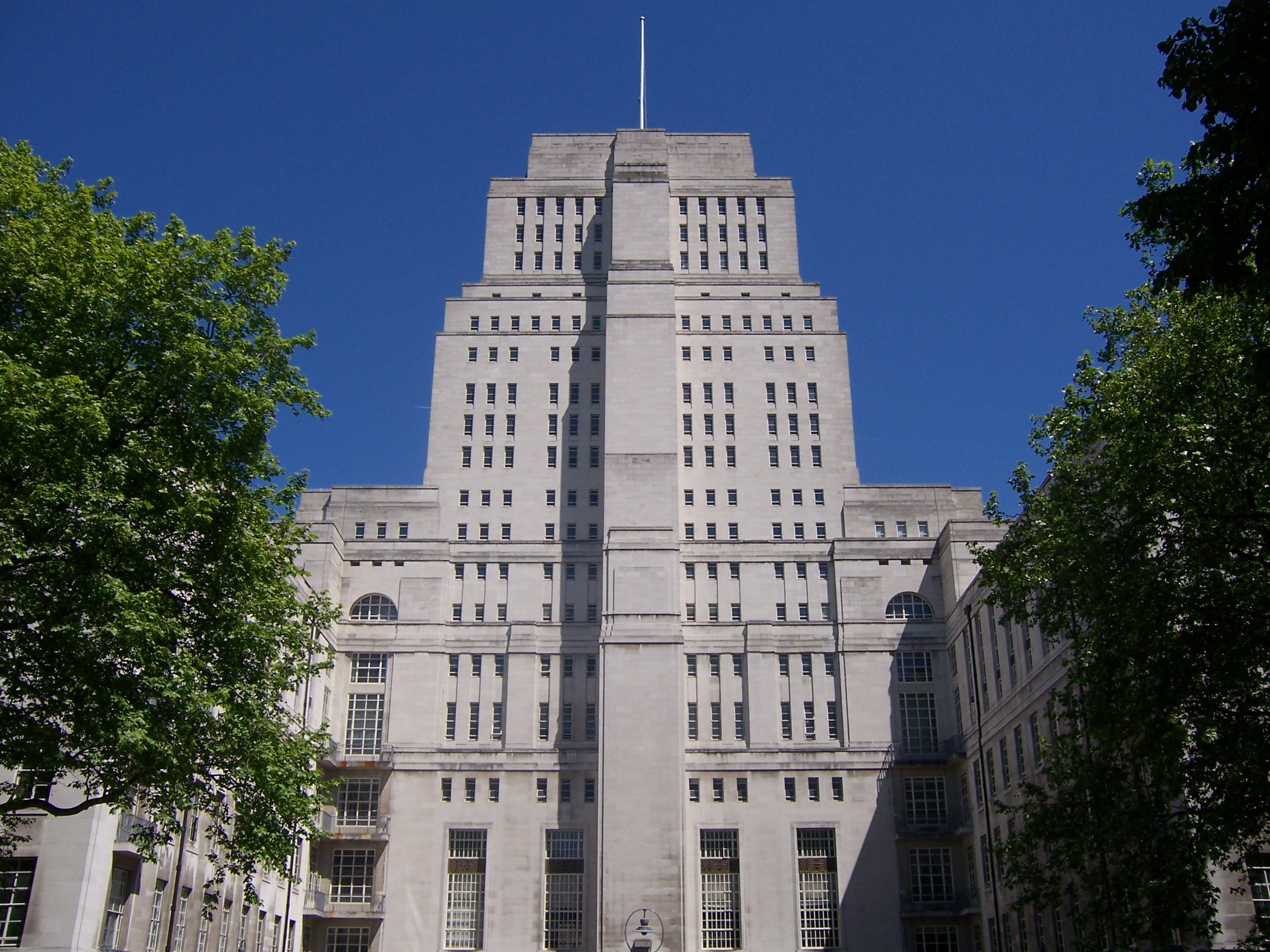
University of London, founded in 1836, was established as an independent examining board for affiliated colleges, with King's College London and University College London as the founding colleges.

The list of modern universities in Europe (1801–1940) contains all universities that were founded in Europe after the French Revolution and before the end of World War II. Universities are regarded as comprising all institutions of higher education recognized as universities by the public or ecclesiastical authorities in charge and authorized to confer academic degrees in more than one faculty. Temporary foundations are also included. Where institutions not meeting the definition of a University are included (e.g. university colleges) these are indicated by footnotes.

At the outset of the 19th century, European universities had been severely affected by the Napoleonic Wars, their number falling in the brief span of time between 1789 and 1815 from 143 to 83. By 1840 their number recovered to 98 universities with approximately 80,000 students and 5,000 professors. Notwithstanding the trend towards specialized institutions of higher learning – in France, for instance, the universities had been suppressed and replaced by Grandes écoles – the size of the student and professor bodies multiplied over the next hundred years, attaining a size of 600,000 and 32,000 members respectively at around two hundred universities. In total, the period saw about 220 universities in existence that are listed below. (Note: This number also includes Russian universities in the Asian part of the country which are not included in this list.)

== List ==
The list is sorted by the date of recognition. At places where more than one university was established, the name of the institution is given in brackets.

=== 19th century ===
Recognized	University	Modern country
1802	Tartu (Dorpat)	Estonia
1803	Rennes	France
1804	Kazan (State University)	Russia
1804	Kharkiv	Ukraine
1805	Clermont-Ferrand (University of Auvergne)	France
1806	Prague Polytechnic	Czech Republic
1808	Lyon (Claude Bernard University)	France
1808	Rouen	France
1808	Belgrade	Serbia
1810	Berlin (Humboldt University)	Germany
1811	Oslo (formerly Christiania)	Norway
1816	Warsaw	Poland
1816	Liège	Belgium
1816/17	Ghent	Belgium
1817	Leuven (State University) (Note: Closed 1835)	Belgium
1817	Lille	France
1818	Bonn	Germany
1822	Lampeter (Note: Not listed by Rüegg (p. 684). Limited degree awarding powers: Bachelor of Divinity 1852; Bachelor of Arts 1865. College of the University of Wales 1971. Recognised as a university 2007.)	Wales
1823	Corfu	Greece
1825	Karlsruhe (Institute of Technology)	Germany
1826	London (University College) (Note: Listed as part of the University of London rather than a separate institution by Rüegg (p. 684). UCL was founded in 1826 but not formally recognised as a college and affiliated to the University of London until 1836. Formally remains a college of the University of London and not a university. Degree awarding powers 2005.)	England
1828	Dresden (Technical University)	Germany
1829	London (King's College) (Note: Listed as part of the University of London rather than a separate institution by Rüegg (p. 684). King's was recognised as a college in 1829 and affiliated to the University of London in 1836. Formally remains a college of the University of London and not a university. Degree awarding powers 2006.)	England
1829	Copenhagen (Technical University)	Denmark
1829	Stuttgart	Germany
1831	Namur	Belgium
1831	Hannover	Germany
1832	Durham	England
1833	Zurich	Switzerland
1834	Bern	Switzerland
1834	Leuven (Catholic University) (Note: Originally in Mechelen; moved to Leuven 1835. Divided into French and Dutch speaking universities 1968)	Belgium
1834	Brussels (Free University of)	Belgium
1834	Kyiv	Ukraine
1836	London (University of)	England
1836	Chemnitz (Technical University)	Germany
1837	Athens (University of)	Greece
1845	Belfast (Note: Queen's College, Belfast 1845. College of the Queen's University of Ireland 1850. Affiliated to the Royal University of Ireland 1879. Recognised as a university 1908.)	Northern Ireland
1845	Cork (Note: Queen's College, Cork 1845. College of the Queen's University of Ireland 1850. Affiliated to the Royal University of Ireland 1879. College of the National University of Ireland 1908. Recognised as a constituent university of the National University 1997.)	Ireland
1845	Galway (Note: Queen's College, Galway 1845. College of the Queen's University of Ireland 1850. Affiliated to the Royal University of Ireland 1879. College of the National University of Ireland 1908. Recognised as a constituent university of the National University 1997.)	Ireland
1851	Manchester (Owens College) (Note: Owens College 1851. College of the Victoria University 1880. Recognised as a university 1903.)	England
1854	Dublin (Catholic University) (Note: Not recognised as a university by the civil authorities. Reformed as University College Dublin and affiliated to the Royal University of Ireland 1880. College of the National University of Ireland 1908. Recognised as a constituent university of the National University 1997.)	Ireland
1854	Kampen (Theological University of the Reformed Churches) (Note: Founded as a theological school in 1854. Recognised as a university in 1987.)	Netherlands
1855	ETH Zurich	Switzerland
1858	Brussels (Saint-Louis University) (Note: Established 1858 as the philosophy department of the Institut Saint-Louis. University-status confirmed in 1890.)	Belgium
1860	Iași	Romania
1864	Bucharest	Romania
1865	Odessa	Ukraine
1868	Moscow (Technical University) (Note: Craft School 1830. University 1868.)	Russia
1868	Munich (Technical University)	Germany
1869	Zagreb	Croatia
1870	Aachen (RWTH)	Germany
1871	Newcastle (Note: Durham University College of Science 1871. Recognised as a university 1963.)	England
1872	Sciences Po	France
1872	Geneva	Switzerland
1872	Aberystwyth (Note: Listed as part of the University of Wales rather than a separate institution by Rüegg (p. 687). University College Wales 1872. College of the University of Wales 1893. Recognised as a university 2007.)	Wales
1872	Cluj-Napoca (Franz Joseph University)	Romania
1874	Leeds (Note: Yorkshire College of Science 1874. College of the Victoria University 1887. Recognised as a university 1904.)	England
1875	Czernowitz	Ukraine
1875	Angers	France
1875	Lille (Catholic University)	France
1875	Lyon	France
1875	Paris	France
1875	Birmingham (Note: Mason Science College 1875. Recognised as a university 1900.)	England
1876	Bristol (Note: University College, Bristol 1876. Recognised as a university 1909.)	England
1877	Darmstadt (Technical University) (Note: Opened as a trade school in 1842. Formation of Polytechnic School by merger with other schools in 1869. Elevated to status of Technische Hochschule with university status in 1877 (foundation year acc. university). Current name as Technical University of Darmstadt since 1997.)	Germany
1877	Toulouse	France
1877	Stockholm	Sweden
1879	Sheffield (Note: Firth College 1879. Recognised as a university 1905.)	England
1880	Amsterdam (Free University)	Netherlands
1880	Manchester (Victoria University)	England
1881	Nottingham (Note: University College, Nottingham 1881. Recognised as a university 1948.)	England
1881	Dundee (Note: University College, Dundee 1881. College of the University of St Andrews 1897. Recognised as a university 1967.)	Scotland
1883	Liverpool (Note: University College, Liverpool 1883. College of the Victoria University 1884. Recognised as a university 1903.)	England
1883	Cardiff (Note: Listed as part of the University of Wales rather than a separate institution by Rüegg (p. 687). University College South Wales and Monmouthshire 1883. College of the University of Wales 1893. Recognised as a university 2005.)	Wales
1884	Bangor (Note: Listed as part of the University of Wales rather than a separate institution by Rüegg (p. 687). University College North Wales 1884. College of the University of Wales 1893. Recognised as a university 2007.)	Wales
1886	Deusto	Spain
1887	Athens (Technical)	Greece
1888	Sofia	Bulgaria
1889	Fribourg	Switzerland
1890	Lausanne	Switzerland
1893	Wales	Wales
1894	Ilmenau (Institute of Technology)	Germany
1896	Mons	Belgium
1899	Brno University of Technology	Czech Republic

=== 20th century ===
Recognized	University	Modern country
1901	Reading (Note: University Extension College 1892. University College Reading 1901. Recognised as a university 1926.)	England
1902	Southampton (Note: Hartley University College 1902. Recognised as a university 1952.)	England
1904	Comillas	Spain
1904	Příbram (Mining University)	Czech Republic
1905	Belgrade	Serbia
1907	London (Imperial College) (Note: Founded as a college of the University of London by merging the pre-existing Royal College of Science, Royal School of Mines and City and Guilds College into a single institution. Separated from the University of London in 2007 becoming independent.)	England
1908	Rome (Angelicum)	Italy
1909	Neuchâtel	Switzerland
1909	Saratov	Russia
1911	Reykjavík	Iceland
1911	Porto	Portugal
1912	Debrecen	Hungary
1913	Mogilev (Note: Teachers School 1913. University 1997.)	Belarus
1913	Rotterdam (Erasmus University) (Note: Founded as a school in 1913. Recognised as a Hoogeschool with university status in 1937. Current name as Erasmus University since 1973)	Netherlands
1914	Frankfurt	Germany
1915	Murcia	Spain
1915	Rostov-on-Don	Russia
1916	Nizhny Novgorod	Russia
1917	Turku (Åbo Akademi)	Finland
1917	Perm	Russia
1918	Tbilisi	Georgia
1918	Dnipro	Ukraine
1918	Smolensk	Russia
1918	Petrograd (Communist University)	Russia
1918	Moscow (State Pedagogical University)	Russia
1918	Voronezh	Russia
1918	Simferopol (Taurida University)	Ukraine
1919	Baku State University	Azerbaijan
1919	Warsaw (Free Polish University)	Poland
1919	Bratislava	Slovakia
1919	Brno (Masaryk University)	Czech Republic
1919	Brno (Mendel University)	Czech Republic
1919	Hamburg	Germany
1919	Ljubljana	Slovenia
1919	Poznań	Poland
1919	Riga	Latvia
1919	Tallinn (Pedagogical)	Estonia
1919	Moscow (Sverdlov University)	Russia
1919	Cluj-Napoca	Romania
1919	Tilburg (Note: Founded as a school of commerce in 1919. Recognised as a Hoogeschool with university status in 1939.)	Netherlands
1920	Athens (Agricultural)	Greece
1920	Yerevan State University	Armenia
1920	Turku (University of)	Finland
1920	Sofia (UNWE)	Bulgaria
1920	Milan (Catholic University)	Italy
1920	Lublin	Poland
1920	Bucharest (Politehnica)	Romania
1920	Timișoara	Romania
1920	Samara	Russia
1920	Yekaterinburg	Russia
1920	Swansea (Note: Listed as part of the University of Wales rather than a separate institution by Rüegg (p. 687). University College Swansea 1920, a college of the University of Wales. Recognised as a university 2007.)	Wales
1921	Minsk	Belarus
1921	Moscow (KUNMZ)	Russia
1921	Moscow (KUTV)	Russia
1921	Pécs	Hungary
1921	Szeged	Hungary
1922	Kaunas	Lithuania
1923	Nijmegen (Radboud University)	Netherlands
1923	Bari	Italy
1923	Tbilisi	Georgia
1924	Milan (University of)	Italy
1924	Trieste	Italy
1925	Thessaloniki	Greece
1927	Geneva (Graduate Institute of International Studies) (Note: Specialist graduate school rather than full university)	Switzerland
1930	Lisbon (Technical University)	Portugal
1934	Aarhus	Denmark
1937	Bratislava (Technical University)	Slovakia
1937	Iași (Gheorghe Asachi)	Romania
1940	Salamanca (Pontifical University)	Spain
1940	Chișinău	Moldova

== See also ==
- List of universities and colleges in Europe
- History of European universities
- List of oldest universities in continuous operation
- List of early modern universities in Europe

== Sources ==
- Rüegg, Walter: "Themes", in: Rüegg, Walter (ed.): A History of the University in Europe. Vol. III: Universities in the Nineteenth and Early Twentieth Centuries (1800–1945), Cambridge University Press, 2004, ISBN 978-0-521-36107-1, pp. 3–31
- Rüegg, Walter: "European Universities and Similar Institutions in Existence between 1812 and the End of 1944: A Chronological List: Universities", in: Rüegg, Walter (ed.): A History of the University in Europe. Vol. III: Universities in the Nineteenth and Early Twentieth Centuries (1800–1945), Cambridge University Press, 2004, ISBN 978-0-521-36107-1, pp. 673–691
