= École nationale supérieure d'ingénieurs de Tunis =

The Higher National Engineering School of Tunis
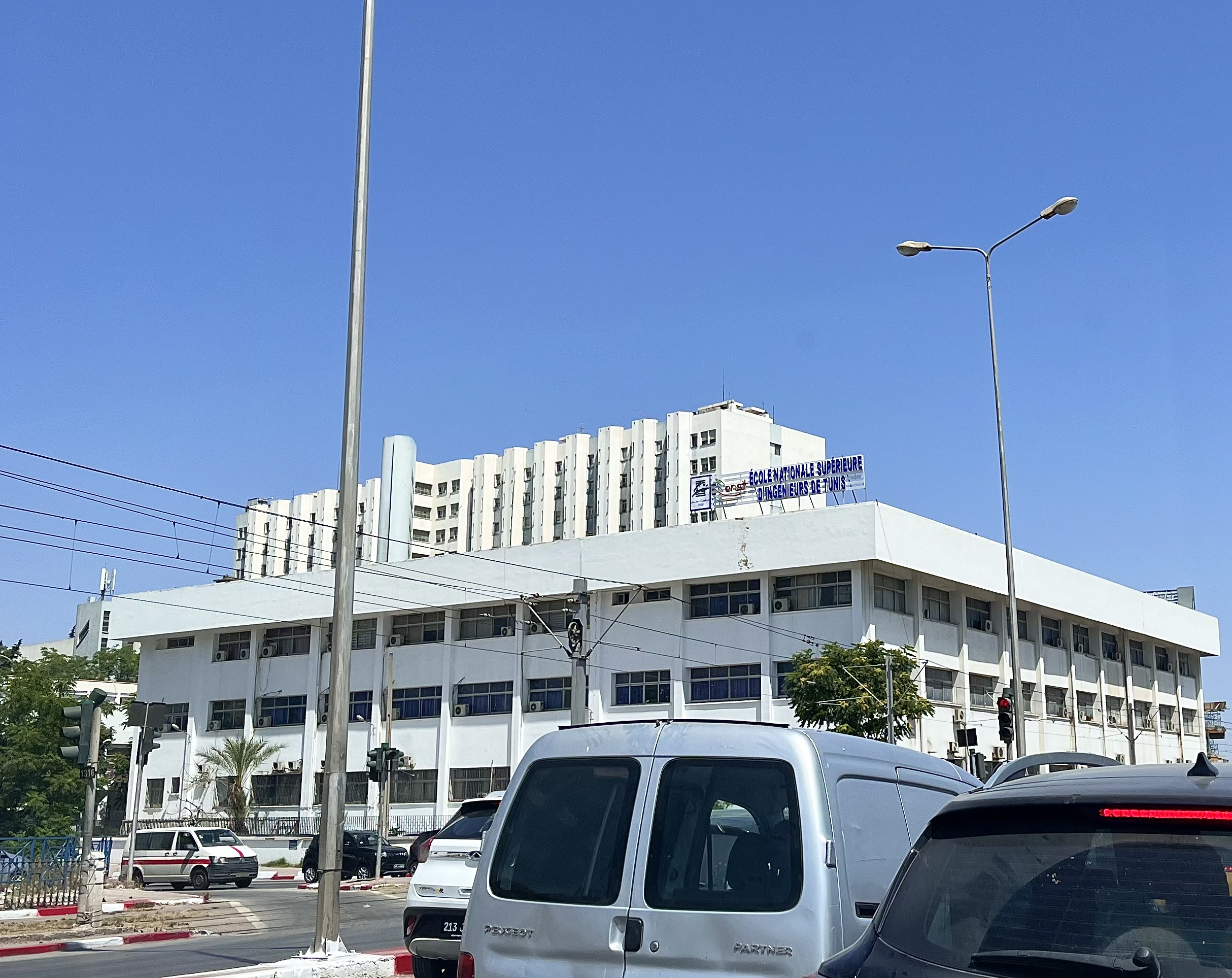
- Type: Public
- Established: 2011
- Affiliation: Tunis University
- President: Rached Gharbi
- Location: Tunis, Tunisia; 36°47′05″N 10°10′49″E
- Language: French, English
- Website: www.ensit.tn

The Higher National Engineering School of Tunis, is a public institution of higher education and scientific research and a member of the University of Tunis.

ENSIT establishment was a response to the increasing industrialization of Tunisia. The school is currently an "école d'ingénieurs", or school of engineering, which follows to some extent the European polytechnic university model. In 2011, the main focus of ENSIT was to form engineers with high scientific aptitude in the fields of civil, mechanical, electrical engineering and computer science. The academic year of 2012/2013 brought two more specializations: industrial engineering and applied mathematics. The change of curriculum has dictated an end to the LMD reforms (License, Master, Doctorate) by which the admission process was organized. However, the school retains its doctorate and master's programs.

== History ==
Established in 1973, the ENSIT was known as École Normale Supérieure de l'Enseignement Technique which was an accredited higher education institution that formed professors in electrical engineering and industrial science. The ENSET was regarded as a normal school with credit and prestige. In 1994, educational reforms mandated the transformation of the ENSET to École supérieure des sciences et techniques de Tunis and later in 2003, the ESSTT was subscribed to the LMD reforms. In 2011, the ENSIT was established as an engineering school with both undergraduate and graduate programs.

== Admission ==
Undergraduate candidates will have to sit for the national competitive exams for engineering studies. Individual applications to the graduate and post-graduate programs are accepted but require a high academic profile.
