= List of early modern universities in Europe =

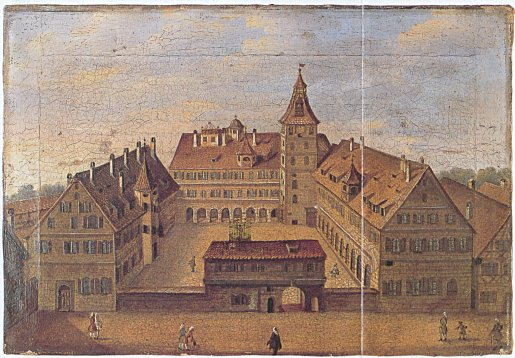
The University of Altdorf, Germany, in 1714

The list of early modern universities in Europe comprises all universities that existed in early modern Europe (1501–1800). It also includes short-lived foundations and educational institutions whose university status is a matter of debate. The operation of the degree-awarding university with its corporate organization and relative autonomy, which had emerged in the Christian medieval world, was continued into the new era. The number of universities which had been in existence at one time during the period rose from around eighty medieval universities to nearly two hundred. While the universitas arrived in Eastern Europe as far as Moscow, many were established further west either by the new Protestant powers or the Catholic Counter-Reformation spearheaded by the Jesuits. At the same time, the Spanish founded colonial universities and the British colonial colleges in the New World, thus heralding the spread of the university as the center of higher learning around the globe (see List of oldest universities).

== Definition ==
A short definition of the university and its defining characteristics as they evolved in the medieval and early modern era is offered by the multi-volume History of the University in Europe of the European University Association:

The university is a European institution; indeed, it is the European institution par excellence. There are various reasons for this assertion. As a community of teachers and taught, accorded certain rights, such as administrative autonomy and the determination and realization of curricula (courses of study) and of the objectives of research as well as the award of publicly recognized degrees, it is a creation of medieval Europe, which was the Europe of papal Christianity...

No other European institution has spread over the entire world in the way in which the traditional form of the European university has done. The degrees awarded by European universities – the bachelor's degree, the licentiate, the master's degree, and the doctorate – have been adopted in the most diverse societies throughout the world. The four medieval faculties of artes – variously called philosophy, letters, arts, arts and sciences, and humanities –, law, medicine, and theology have survived and have been supplemented by numerous disciplines, particularly the social sciences and technological studies, but they remain none the less at the heart of universities throughout the world.

Even the name of the universitas, which in the Middle Ages was applied to corporate bodies of the most diverse sorts and was accordingly applied to the corporate organization of teachers and students, has in the course of centuries been given a more particular focus: the university, as a universitas litterarum, has since the 18th century been the intellectual institution which cultivates and transmits the entire corpus of methodically studied intellectual disciplines.

== List of universities existing in the early modern age, but created before ==
The list is sorted by the date of recognition. Note that the date of recognition is not necessarily the date of creation : for example, a community of teachers and students existed per se in Paris during the 11th century. At places where more than one university was established, the name of the institution is given in brackets.

There were other institutions of higher education in the medieval and early modern period outside of the list such as: the Esztergom and the Kalocsa Universities the Boldogasszony College of Buda, Gyula, Nagybánya s or the Nagyőr Colleges but little information has survived beyond their existence.

=== 11th century ===
Recognized	University	Modern country
established 1088 (Note: Imperial charter (Constitutio habita) from Frederick I Barbarossa issued in 1158.)	Bologna	Italy
1096	Oxford	England

=== 12th century ===
Recognized	University	Modern country
1175	Modena	Italy
1126-96	Veszprém	Hungary

=== 13th century ===
Recognized	University	Modern country
Beginning of 13th c.	Paris	France
Beginning of 13th c.	Montpellier	France
1209–25	Cambridge	England
1212	Palencia	Spain
1215	Arezzo	Italy
Before 1218/9	Salamanca	Spain
1222	Padua	Italy
1224	Naples	Italy
1229	Toulouse	France
1231	Salerno	Italy
c.1235	Orléans	France
1241	Valladolid	Spain
1246	Siena	Italy
c.1250	Angers	France
1261	Northampton	England
1272	Murcia	Spain
1290	Macerata	Italy
1290	Lisbon	Portugal
1293	Madrid	Spain
1300	Lleida	Spain

=== 14th century ===
Recognized	University	Modern country
1303	Avignon	France
1303	Rome (Sapienza)	Italy
1304-1305	Dominican College of Buda	Hungary
1308	Coimbra	Portugal
1308	Perugia	Italy
1332	Cahors (in French)	France
1333	Stamford	England
1336	Camerino	Italy
1339	Grenoble	France
1343	Pisa	Italy
1347	Prague (Charles University, in German and Czech)	Czech Republic
1349	Firenze	Italy
1350	Perpignan	France
1354	Huesca (in Spanish)	Spain
1361	Pavia	Italy
1364	Cracow	Poland
1365	Orange	France
1365	Vienna	Austria
1367	Pécs	Hungary
1369	Lucca (in Italian)	Italy
1386	Heidelberg	Germany
1388	Cologne	Germany
1389	Erfurt	Germany
1391	Ferrara	Italy
1395	Óbuda	Hungary
1396	Zadar	Croatia

=== 15th century ===
Recognized	University	Modern country
1402	Würzburg	Germany
1404	Turin	Italy
1409	Leipzig	Germany
1409	Aix-en-Provence	France
1412	Parma	Italy
1413	St Andrews	Scotland
1419	Rostock	Germany
1422	Dole	France
1425	Leuven	Belgium
1431	Poitiers	France
1432	Caen	France
1434	Catania	Italy
1441	Bordeaux	France
1450	Barcelona	Spain
1451	Glasgow	Scotland
1452	Valence	France
1453	Istanbul	Turkey
1454	Trier	Germany
1456	Greifswald	Germany
1457	Freiburg	Germany
1459	Basel	Switzerland
1459	Ingolstadt	Germany
1460	Nantes	France
1464	Bourges	France
1465	Bratislava	Hungary (now Slovakia)
1470	Venice (Note: University status open to dispute.)	Italy
1471	Genoa	Italy
1474	Zaragoza	Spain
1476	Mainz	Germany
1476	Tübingen	Germany
1477	Uppsala	Sweden
1479	Copenhagen	Denmark
1483	Palma, Majorca	Spain
1489	Sigüenza	Spain
1495	Old Aberdeen	Scotland
1498	Frankfurt on the Oder	Germany
1499	Alcalá de Henares	Spain
1500	Valencia	Spain

== List of universities created in the early modern age ==
=== 16th century ===
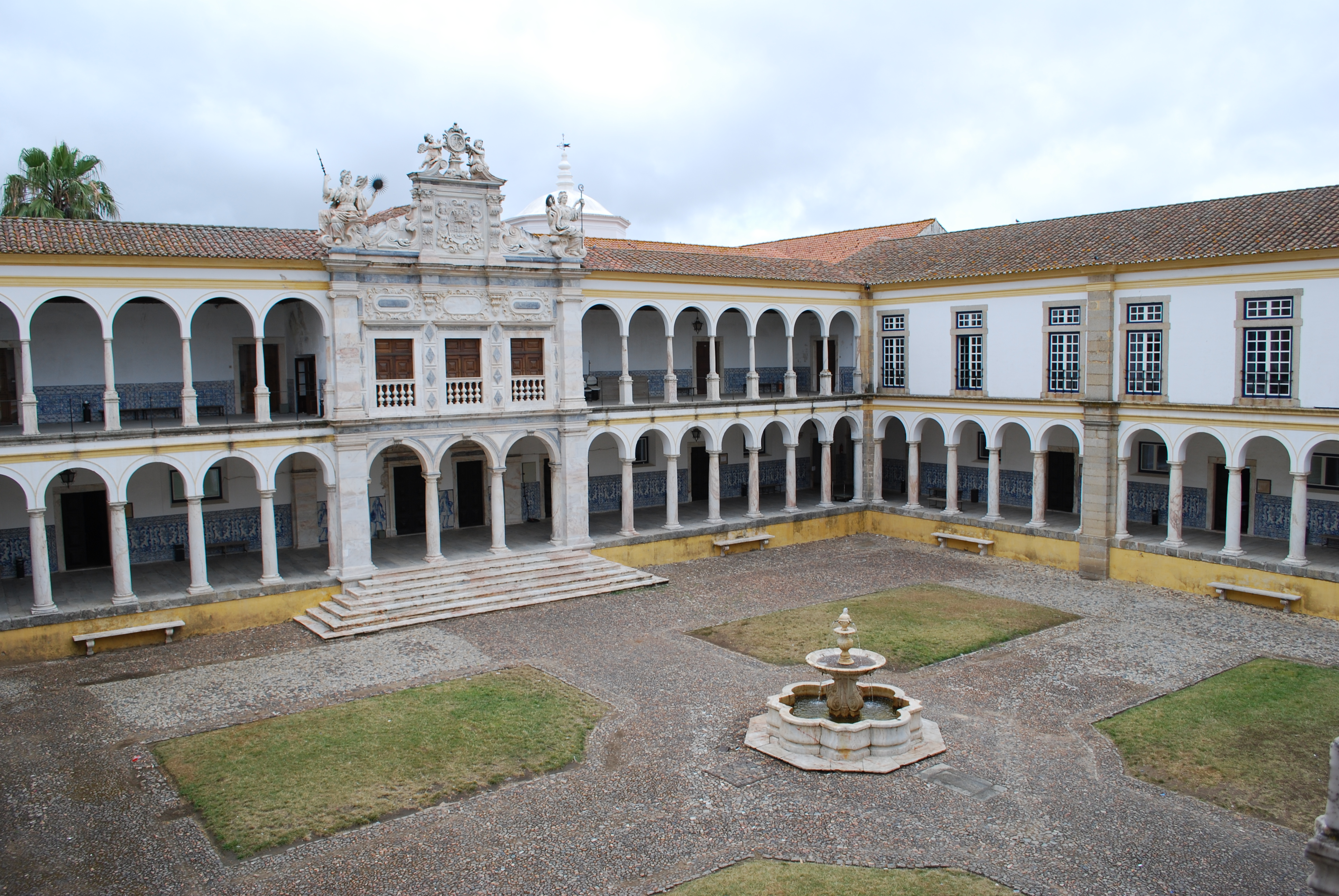
16th century building of the University of Évora, Portugal.

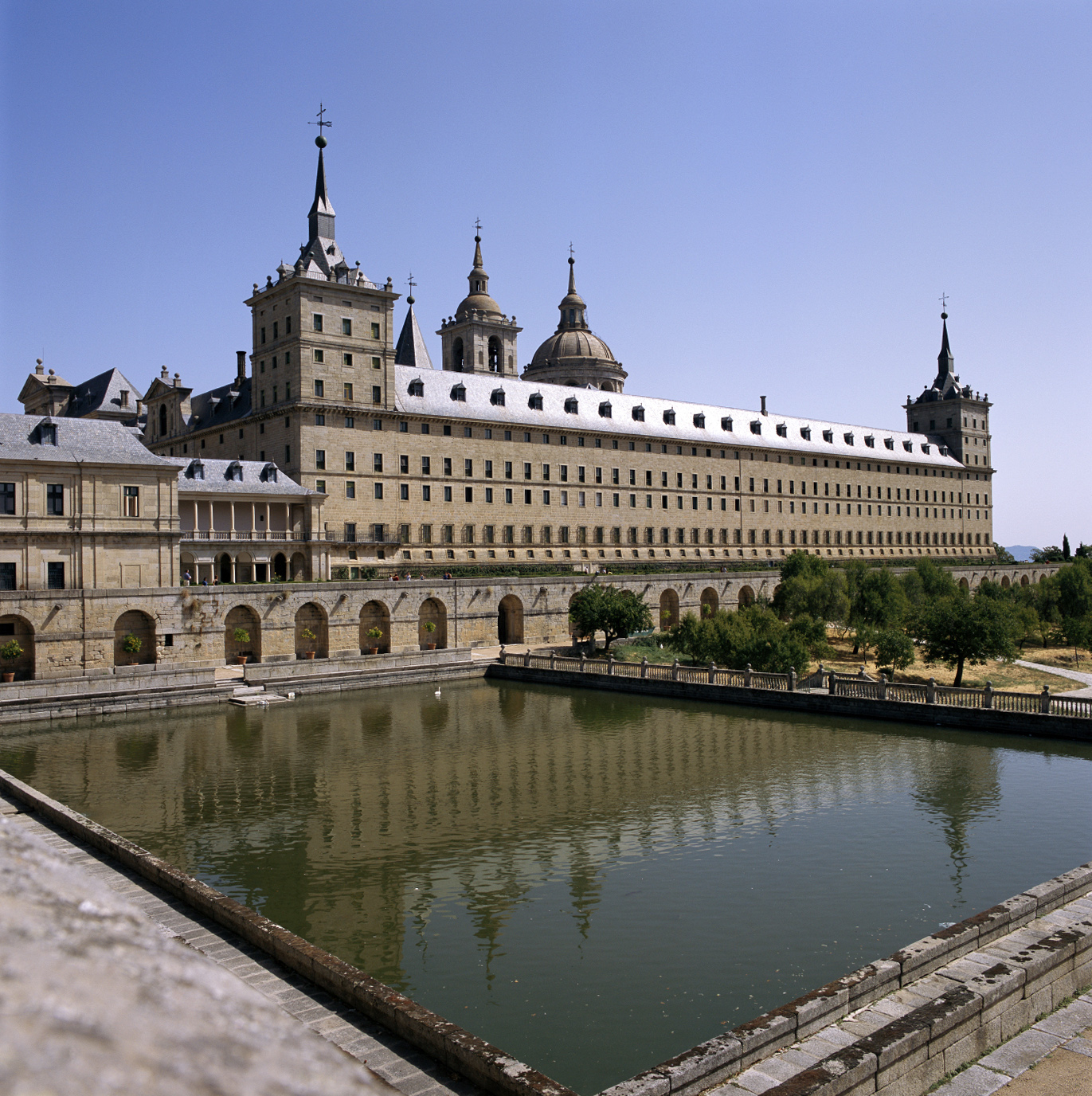
Monastery and Site of El Escorial

Recognized	University	Modern country
1502	Wittenberg	Germany
1505	Seville (Santa María de Jesús)	Spain
1506	Frankfurt (Oder)	Germany
1516	Seville (Santo Tomás)	Spain
1521	Toledo	Spain
1526	Santiago de Compostela	Spain
1527	Marburg	Germany
1531	Granada	Spain
1534	Sahagún	Spain
1537	Lausanne	Switzerland
1538	Debrecen	Hungary
1539	Nîmes	France
1540	Macerata	Italy
1540	Oñate (in Spanish)	Spain
1542	Baeza	Spain
1544	Königsberg (disbanded 1945)	Poland, Prussia
1547	Gandía	Spain
1548	Reims	France
1548	Messina	Italy
1548	Tournon	France
1548/9	Osuna	Spain
c.1550	Irache	Spain
1550	Almagro (in Spanish)	Spain
1550	Osma (Santa Catalina)	Spain
1551	Tortosa	Spain
1551	National University of San Marcos	Peru
1552	Orihuela (in Spanish)	Spain
1553	Dillingen	Germany
1556	Milan	Italy
1556	Prague (Collegium Clementinum)	Czech Republic
1556	Rome (Gregorianum)	Italy
1557/8	Jena	Germany
1558/9	Évora	Portugal
1559	Geneva	Switzerland
1559	Nice	France
1559/60	Douai	France
1560	Mondovì	Italy
1562	Ancona	Italy
1565	Estella	Spain
1568	Braunsberg	Poland
1570	Olomouc	Czech Republic
1572	Pont-à-Mousson	France
1574	Oviedo	Spain
1574	Tarragona	Spain
1575	Leiden	Netherlands
1575/6	Helmstedt	Germany
1576	Ávila	Spain
1576	Ostroh	Ukraine
1577	Rome, Collegium Divi Thomae, (Angelicum)	Italy
1578	Palermo	Italy
1579	Vilnius	Lithuania
1581	Cluj-Napoca, Babeș-Bolyai University	Principality of Transylvania (now Romania)
1582/3	Edinburgh	Scotland
1583	Orthez	France
1585	Fermo	Italy
1585	Franeker	Netherlands
1585/6	Graz	Austria
1587	El Escorial	Spain
1587	Girona	Spain
1592	Valletta (Collegium Melitense)	Malta
1592	Trinity College Dublin	Ireland
1592	Fraserburgh	Scotland
1593	Marischal College	Scotland
1594	Zamość	Poland
1596/1604	Saumur	France
1598	Montauban (in French)	France
1599	Vic	Spain
1599/1602	Sedan	France

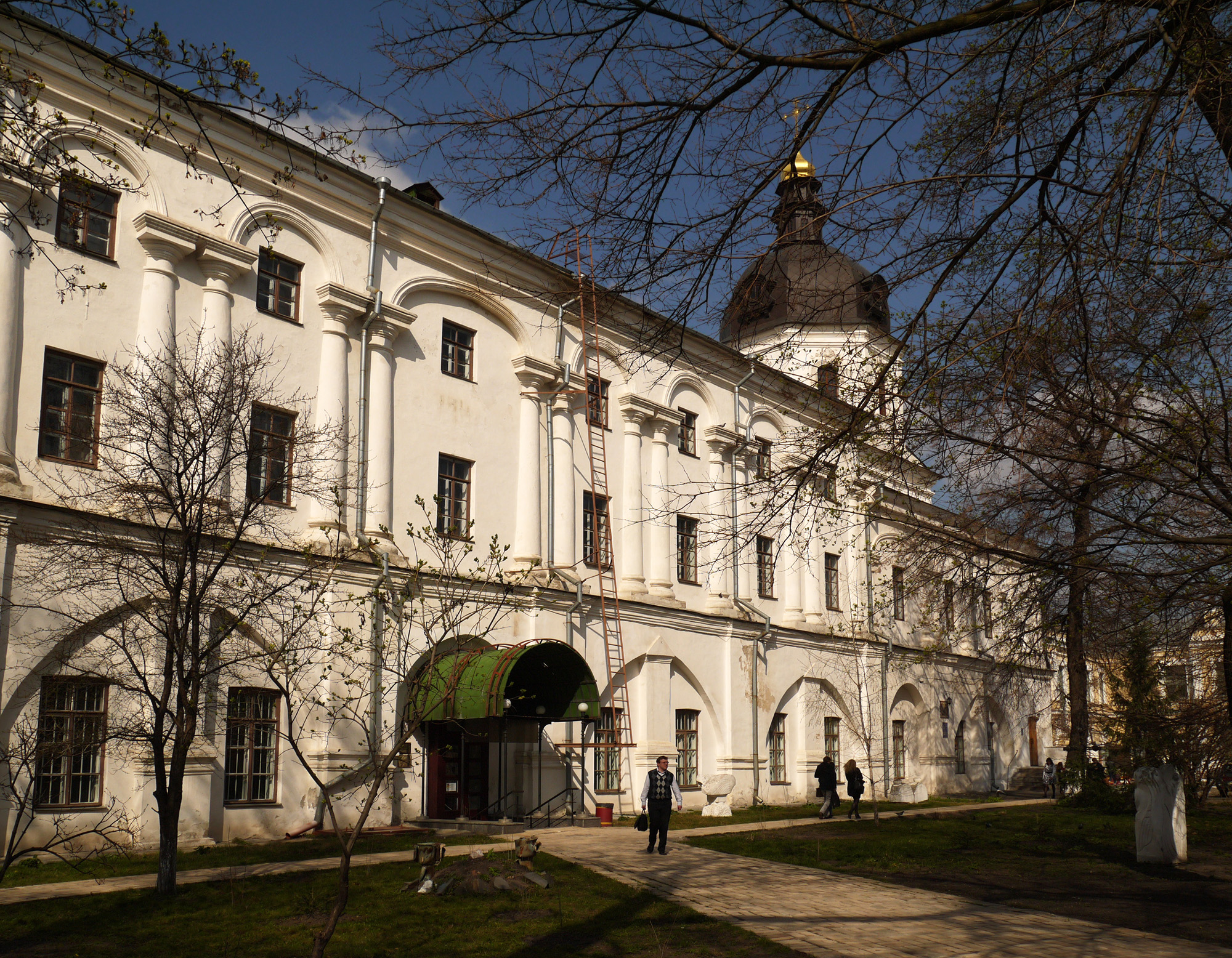
The southern façade of the Old Academic Building of the Kyiv-Mohyla Academy.

=== 17th century ===
Recognized	University	Modern country
1601/4	Die	France
1603	Aix-en-Provence (Collège royal Bourbon)	France
1607	Giessen	Germany
1612/4	Groningen	Netherlands
1614	Solsona	Spain
1615	Kyiv (Mohyla Academy)	Ukraine
1614/6	Paderborn	Germany
1617	Sassari	Italy
1617/8	Molsheim	France
1619	Pamplona	Spain
1620	Rinteln	Germany
1620/5	Salzburg	Austria
1606	Cagliari	Italy
1621	Strassburg	France
1622/3	Altdorf	Germany
1625	Mantua	Italy
1629/32	Osnabrück	Germany
1632	Tartu (Dorpat)	Estonia
1633	Kassel	Germany
1634	Iași	Moldavia
1635	Trnava (became ELTE, PPCU and SE)	Hungary (now Slovakia)
1636	Utrecht	Netherlands
1640	Turku	Finland
1647/8	Harderwijk	Netherlands
1648	Bamberg	Germany
1652	Kiel	Germany
1653	Durham	England
1654	Duisburg	Germany
1655	Nijmegen	Netherlands
1657	Košice	Hungary (now Slovakia)
1661	Lviv	Ukraine
1665	Prešov	Hungary (now Slovakia)
1666/8	Lund	Sweden
1668	Innsbruck	Austria
1669	Zagreb	Croatia
1671	Urbino	Italy
1671	Montbéliard	France
1674	Linz	Austria
1685	Strasbourg	France
1691	Besançon	France
1693/4	Halle	Germany

=== 18th century ===
Recognized	University	Modern country
1701	La Laguna	Spain
1702	Breslau	Poland
1707	Iași	Romania
1710	Charité (University of Medicine)	Germany
1714/7	Cervera	Spain
1722	Dijon	France
1722	Pau	France
1724	Saint Petersburg	Russia
1727	Camerino	Italy
1732/4	Fulda	Germany
1733/7	Göttingen	Germany
1735	Rennes	France
1742/3	Erlangen	Germany
1745	Braunschweig (Technische Hochschule)	Germany
1748	Altamura	Italy
1755	Moscow	Russia
1760	Bützow (in German)	Germany
1765	Corte	France
1765	Freiberg (Technische Hochschule)	Germany
1768	Nancy	France
1769	Malta	Malta
1770	Berlin (Technische Hochschule)	Germany
1771	Münster	Germany
1772/3	Modena	Italy
1773	Istanbul Technical University	Turkey
1775	Clausthal (Technische Hochschule)	Germany
1777	Bonn	Germany
1781	Stuttgart	Germany
1782	Budapest University of Technology and Economics	Hungary

== See also ==
- History of European research universities
