= Rankings of universities in Latin America =

Rankings of universities in Latin America have been published by Quacquarelli Symonds, SCImago and Webometrics.

== QS Ranking ==
New Rankings of Universities have been published by QS World University Rankings 2024. (apply filter by location "Latin America")

(2020) Top 20	University
1	(Brazil) Universidade de São Paulo
2	Pontificia Universidad Católica de Chile
3	(Brazil) Universidade Estadual de Campinas
4	(Mexico) Tecnológico de Monterrey
5	Universidad de Chile
6	(Colombia) Universidad de los Andes
7	Universidad Nacional Autónoma de Mexico
8	(Brazil) Universidade Federal do Rio de Janeiro
9	(Argentina) Universidad de Buenos Aires
10	(Brazil) UNESP
11	(Chile) Universidad de Concepción
12	Universidad Nacional de Colombia
13	Pontificia Universidad Catolica del Peru
14	(Brazil) Universidade Federal de Minas Gerais
15	Universidad de Santiago de Chile
16	(Colombia) Pontificia Universidad Javeriana
17	(Brazil) Pontificia Universidade Católica do Rio de Janeiro
18	(Brazil) Universidade Federal Rio Grande do Sul
19	(Colombia) Universidad de Antioquia
20	Universidad de Costa Rica

== SCImago Institutions Rankings (2016) ==
Rankings of institutions in Latin America have been published by SCImago for the year 2016.

Top 20	University	Country
1	Universidade de São Paulo	Brazil
2	Consejo Nacional de Investigaciones Cientificas y Tecnicas	Argentina
3	Universidade Estadual de Campinas	Brazil
4	Universidad Nacional Autonoma de Mexico	Mexico
5	Universidade Federal do Rio de Janeiro	Brazil
6	Universidade Estadual Paulista	Brazil
7	Universidade Federal do Rio Grande do Sul	Brazil
8	Universidade Federal de Minas Gerais	Brazil
9	Universidad de Buenos Aires	Argentina
10	Universidad de Chile	Chile
11	Pontificia Universidad Catolica de Chile	Chile
12	Universidade Federal de Santa Catarina	Brazil
13	Universidade Federal de São Paulo	Brazil
14	Universidade Federal do Parana	Brazil
15	Instituto Politecnico Nacional	Mexico
16	Universidad Nacional de La Plata	Argentina
17	Universidad Nacional de Colombia	Colombia
18	Universidade Federal de Pernambuco	Brazil
19	Universidade de Brasilia	Brazil
20	Universidade Federal de Vicosa	Brazil

== Times Higher Education (2015/2016) ==
Rankings of universities including those in Latin America have been published by Times Higher Education Rankings 2018

Top 20	University	Country
1	Universidade Estadual de Campinas	Brazil
2	Universidade de São Paulo	Brazil
3	Pontificia Universidad Católica de Chile	Chile
4	Universidade Federal de São Paulo	Brazil
5	Tecnológico de Monterrey	Mexico
6	Universidad de Chile	Chile
7	Pontifícia Universidade Católica do Rio de Janeiro	Brazil
8	Universidad de los Andes	Colombia
9	Universidade Federal de Minas Gerais	Brazil
10	Universidade Federal do Rio Grande do Sul	Brazil

== See also ==
- List of colonial universities in Latin America
