= A History of the University in Europe =

Book series devoted to European universities

A History of the University in Ẻurope
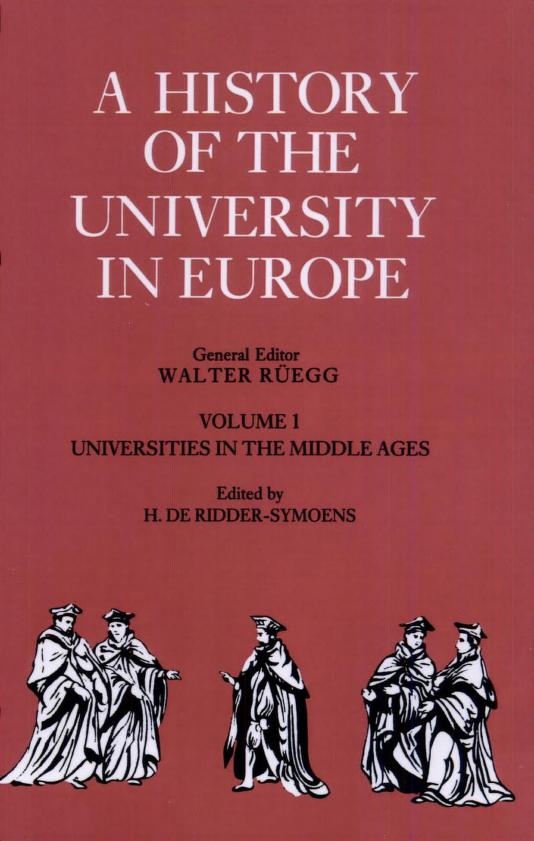
- Author: Hilde de Ridder-Symoens and Walter Rüegg (eds.)
- Country: United Kingdom
- Language: Fully: English, German; Partly: Spanish, Portuguese; In progress: Russian, Chinese
- Genre: University history
- Publisher: Cambridge University Press
- Published: 1992–2011
- No. of books: 4

A History of the University in Europe is a four-volume book series on the history and development of the European university from the medieval origins of the institution until the present day. The series was directed by the European University Association and published by Cambridge University Press between 1992 and 2011. The volumes consist of individual contributions by international experts in the field and is considered the most comprehensive and authoritative work on the subject to date. It has been fully or partly translated into several languages.

== Synopsis ==
The first volume is dedicated to the emergence of the university in the Middle Ages and its development until around 1500. Volume II describes and analyzes the university from the Reformation until the French Revolution (1500–1800), volume III the rise of the modern university until World War II (1800–1945) and the last volume the post-war period up to the present time.

The structure of the book follows a standardized systematic pattern throughout all volumes: the first part ("themes and patterns") introduces the reader to the university as an institution of its time. The second part deals with the institutional "structures" of the university, the third with the "students", their education, activities and careers, and the fourth with individual fields of "learning" taught in the university. Each section is divided into several chapters which were composed by specialists in the various subjects. The main approach is holistic – the book aims less at covering the history of individual universities, but rather the character and historical trajectory of the institution as a whole.

As of 2011, the series has been published in full in English and German, while the first volumes have appeared in Spanish and Portuguese and translations into Russian and Chinese are in preparation.

== Reception ==
According to its editors, the comprehensive scope of A History of the University in Europe has been rivalled only by one previous multi-volume work, the Geschichte der Entstehung und Entwickelung der hohen Schulen unsres Erdtheils ("History of the emergence and development of the higher schools of our continent") which was published in 1802–05 by the German philosopher Christoph Meiners. In the English-language discourse, the book has been welcomed as an overhaul of Hastings Rashdall's long-time standard work The Universities in Europe in the Middle Ages and its 1936 revision by the medievalists F. M. Powicke and A. B. Emden.

The book has received high praise from several reviewers. Edward Grant regards the first part as "the best single volume on the history of medieval universities", noting its comprehensiveness, readability and authority produced by competent editorship and "outstanding contributors". Susan Rosa believes that this volume "sets a standard for competency in historical research", favourably mentioning the collaborative effort which produced little overlap between the various topics. Christopher Ocker lauds the first volume as the "first attempt at a comprehensive survey of this distinctive European institution, the first thorough survey to span every country from the time of the university's birth to humanism since Rashdall", but also thinks that the field of medieval science was somewhat neglected. Matthew Kempshall calls the book "a product of an array of distinguished European scholars", but feels that it might have gone too far in idealizing the university as a supranational institution transcending state particularisms.

== Series ==
The volumes of the series are as follows:

- 1992: Hilde de Ridder-Symoens editor: A History of the University in Europe. Vol. I: Universities in the Middle Ages, Cambridge University Press, ISBN 0-521-36105-2
- 1996: Hilde de Ridder-Symoens editor: A History of the University in Europe. Vol. II: Universities in Early Modern Europe (1500–1800), Cambridge University Press, ISBN 0-521-36106-0
- 2004: Walter Rüegg editor: A History of the University in Europe. Vol. III: Universities in the Nineteenth and Early Twentieth Centuries (1800–1945), Cambridge University Press ISBN 978-0-521-36107-1
- 2011: Walter Rüegg editor: A History of the University in Europe. Vol. IV: Universities Since 1945, Cambridge University Press, ISBN 978-0-521-36108-8

== See also ==
The following lists of universities are – mostly – based on the catalogues compiled in the series:

- List of medieval universities
- List of early modern universities in Europe
- List of modern universities in Europe (1801–1945)
- List of universities in Europe founded after 1945
