= University of Vicenza =

Medieval Italian university

The University of Vicenza (in Italian: Università di Vicenza) was a medieval university located in the town of Vicenza in the Veneto region of Italy. It was recognized as a studium generale in 1204.

The university was first formed by students migrating from the University of Bologna; Hastings Rashdall suggests a number of universities were formed the same way during the first decade of the 13th century. The university closed in 1209.

== See also ==
- List of medieval universities
