= Jean Dunbabin =

British academic

Jean Dunbabin FRHistS FBA
- Born: 1939 (age 86–87)
- Occupations: Historian and academic
- Spouse: John Dunbabin (1962)
- Children: Bridget (b. 1965), Penny (b. 1967)

Academic background
- Thesis: Ethical problems as discussed by masters of arts and theologians in the thirteenth century universities (1964)
- Doctoral advisor: Daniel Callus

Academic work
- Discipline: History
- Sub-discipline: France in the Middle Ages; Kingdom of Sicily; Political history; Intellectual history; History of philosophy; History of education
- Doctoral students: Matthew Kempshall; Jörg Peltzer; Joseph Ziegler

Jean Hymers Dunbabin (born 1939) is an honorary fellow of St Anne's College, University of Oxford. Dunbabin specialises in medieval political communities in France c. 1000-c.1350, and in southern Italy and Sicily 1250–1310, and medieval political thought. She is a fellow of the British Academy - since 2024, Emeritus Fellow.

Dunbabin has contributed to The Cambridge History of Later Medieval Philosophy, The Cambridge History of Medieval Political Thought c.350–c.1450, and The New Cambridge Medieval History. She edited The English Historical Review from 1999 to 2004.

== Personal life ==
Dunbabin is married to John Dunbabin (1962) and has two daughters, Bridget (b. 1965) and Penny (1967)

== Selected publications ==
- France in the Making, 843-1180, Oxford University Press, Oxford, 1985. (2nd ed. 2000)
- "Government", in Cambridge History of Medieval Political Thought, c. 350 - c.1450, Cambridge University Press, Cambridge, 1988, pp. 477 – 519.
- A Hound of God. Pierre de la Palud and the Fourteenth-Century Church, Oxford University Press, Oxford, 1991. ISBN 0198222912
- Charles I of Anjou: Power, Kingship and State-Making in Thirteenth-Century Europe, 1998. (Medieval World Series)
- Captivity and Imprisonment in Medieval Europe, 1000 - 1300, Palgrave Macmillan, Basingstoke and New York, 2002. ISBN 0333647157
- "The household and entourage of Charles I of Anjou, king of the Regno, 1266-85", Historical Research, 77 (197), 2004, pp. 313–336.
- The French in the Kingdom of Sicily, 1266-1305, Cambridge University Press, Cambridge, 2011. ISBN 978-0521198783

== Sources ==
- d’Avray, David (28 February 2020). "Jean Dunbabin: A Scholarly Appreciation". The English Historical Review. 139 (596): e1–e11. doi:10.1093/ehr/ceaa002..
- d’Avray, David (30 March 2020). "Jean Dunbabin: Principal Publications". The English Historical Review. 139 (596): e12–e14. doi:10.1093/ehr/ceaa001..
