= Hilde De Ridder-Symoens =

Belgian historian (1943–2023)

Prof. Dr. Hilde De Ridder-Symoens
- Born: Hildegarde Symoens; 19 April 1943; Molenbeek-Saint-Jean, Brussels, Belgium
- Died: 5 March 2023 (aged 79); Ghent
- Board member of: Belgian Historical Institute in Rome

Academic background
- Education: Athénée Royal de Léopoldville
- Alma mater: University of Ghent
- Thesis: De Brabantse leden van de Germaanse natie van de rechtsuniversiteit van Orleans, 1444-1555 (1969)
- Doctoral advisor: Raoul van Caenegem

Academic work
- Discipline: Historian
- Sub-discipline: prosopography of the medieval university
- Institutions: Free University of Amsterdam, University of Ghent
- Notable works: A History of the University in Europe

Hilde De Ridder-Symoens (19 April 1943 - 5 March 2023) was a Belgian historian. She was Professor of Medieval History at the Free University of Amsterdam (1986–2001) and Professor of Early Modern History at the University of Ghent (2001–2008). Her research focuses on educational history and the history of universities. She edited the first two volumes of Cambridge University Press's A History of the University in Europe (1992, 1996). Together with C.M. Ridderikhoff she published Les livres des procurateurs de la nation germanique de l'ancienne Université d'Orléans, 1444-1602 (4 volumes, Brill, Leiden, 1971-2015).

== Life ==
Born in Molenbeek-Saint-Jean, Brussels, on 19 April 1943, she died in Ghent on 5 March 2023. Hilde Symoens grew up in the Belgian Congo. After graduating secondary school from the Athénée Royal de Léopoldville she registered as a student at the University of Ghent, obtaining the licentiate in History in 1964 and then a doctorate in February 1969, under the supervision of R. C. van Caenegem, with a dissertation on students from the Duchy of Brabant at the law faculty of the University of Orléans between 1444 and 1555. Her further research related to the education of office holders in the late medieval and early modern Low Countries, and more broadly to international student mobility in the Middle Ages and Early Modern Times.

She was a visiting scholar at the Max Planck Institute for European Legal History in Frankfurt, the University of California at Berkeley, Merton College, Oxford, and UCLA.

In 2003 Symoens became a member of the Royal Flemish Academy of Belgium for Science and the Arts. In 2004 a Festschrift in her honour, with contributions drawn from a colloquium held to mark her departure from Amsterdam in 2001, was published by Brill. She became a member of Academia Europaea in 2009.
