= Matthew Kempshall =

British historian (born 1964)

- Born: Matthew Sean Kempshall; 1964 (age 61–62)
- Occupations: Historian and academic

Academic background
- Thesis: Bonum commune and communis utilitas: the notion of the common good and its relation to the individual in late thirteenth century scholastic political and ecclesiastical thought (1991)
- Doctoral advisor: Jean Dunbabin

Academic work
- Discipline: History
- Sub-discipline: Intellectual history; Humanism; Scholasticism; Aristotelianism
- Institutions: University of York; Wadham College, Oxford

Matthew Sean Kempshall (born 1964) is a British historian who specialises in the history of medieval intellectual thought. He is Associate Professor of Medieval History at the University of Oxford and Fellow and Tutor in History, as well as Keeper of the Gardens, at Wadham College.

His main interests are in the 'reception of Aristotle's ethical and political ideas, on the connections between Ciceronian rhetoric and medieval historiography, on the ideology of medieval kingship, and on the understanding of classical republicanism by scholastic theologians and early renaissance humanists'. Most recently he has published Rhetoric and the Writing of History (Manchester 2011). According to WorldCat, the book is held in 196 libraries

== Books ==
- Kempshall, Matthew S. 1999. The common good in late medieval political thought. Oxford: Clarendon press. ISBN 9780198207160
- Kempshall, M. S. 2011. Rhetoric and the writing of history, 400-1500. Manchester: Manchester University Press. ISBN 9780719070303
- McGrade, A.S., John Kilcullen, and Matthew Kempshall. 2001. (co-editors)The Cambridge translations of medieval philosophical texts. Vol. 2, Ethics and political philosophy. Cambridge, UK [etc.]: Cambridge University Press. ISBN 9780521280822
