= Grigorije of Hilandar =

15th century Serbian monk

Grigorije of Hilandar (Serbian: Григорије Хиландарац, romanized: Grigorije Hilandarac; early 15th century) was a learned Serbian Orthodox monk, translator and transcriber from the time of the Serbian Despotate.

== Life and work ==
Despot Stefan Lazarević ordered Grigorije to transcribe the "Paralipomenon" (Books of Chronicles) of Joannes Zonaras the Byzantine writer of the 12th-century who mentions Serbs and which was an important source of knowledge and one of the sources of historical and national consciousness in Serbia during the 14th and 15th century. It was probably translated during the reign of Stefan Uroš II Milutin, the "Chronicle" in the old transcript did not seem reliable to Despot Stefan, so it was Grigorije who in 1407 or 1408 took the task of correcting gross errors and supplemented Zonaras by comparing its sources with the Old Testament and New Testament, Greek monk George Hamartolos, Xenophon and Herodotus, and Cassius Dio, Eusebius of Caesarea, Theodore of Crete and Nikita Retor. This edition of Zonaras's Books of Chronicles entered medieval literary opus under the name "Paralipomenon". In the transcript, Grigorije praises Despot Stefan Lazarević as an exemplary literary envoy, gives practical orthographic instructions for transcribing and correcting books, admires classical antiquity and shows rare criticism and erudite aspirations that testify to the awakening of interest in ancient culture.

Translation of Grigorije of Hilendar's work into modern Serbian was made by Milorad Pavić.

== Literature ==
- Dimitrije Bogdanović: "History of Old Serbian Literature", Belgrade, SKZ, 1980.
- Dejan Mihailović: "Byzantine Circle (Small Dictionary of Early Christian Literature in Greek, Byzantine and Old Serbian Literature)", Belgrade, "Institute for Textbooks", 2009, p. 50-51.
