= List of colonial universities in Hispanic America =

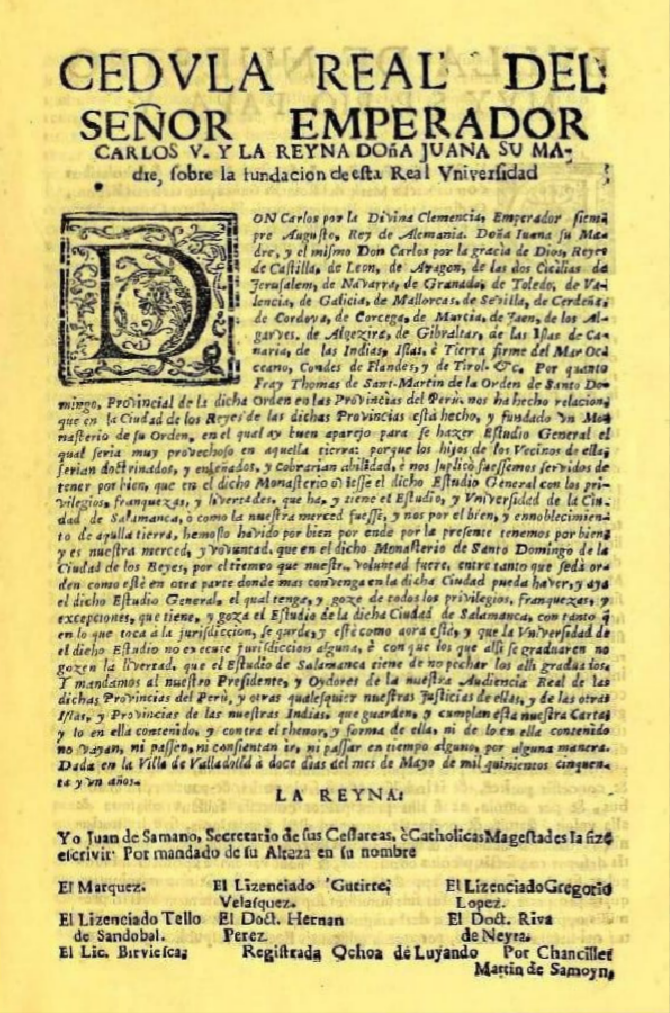
Privilege by Charles V granting the establishment of the University of San Marcos in Lima (1551), the first officially established and the longest continuously operating university in the Americas.

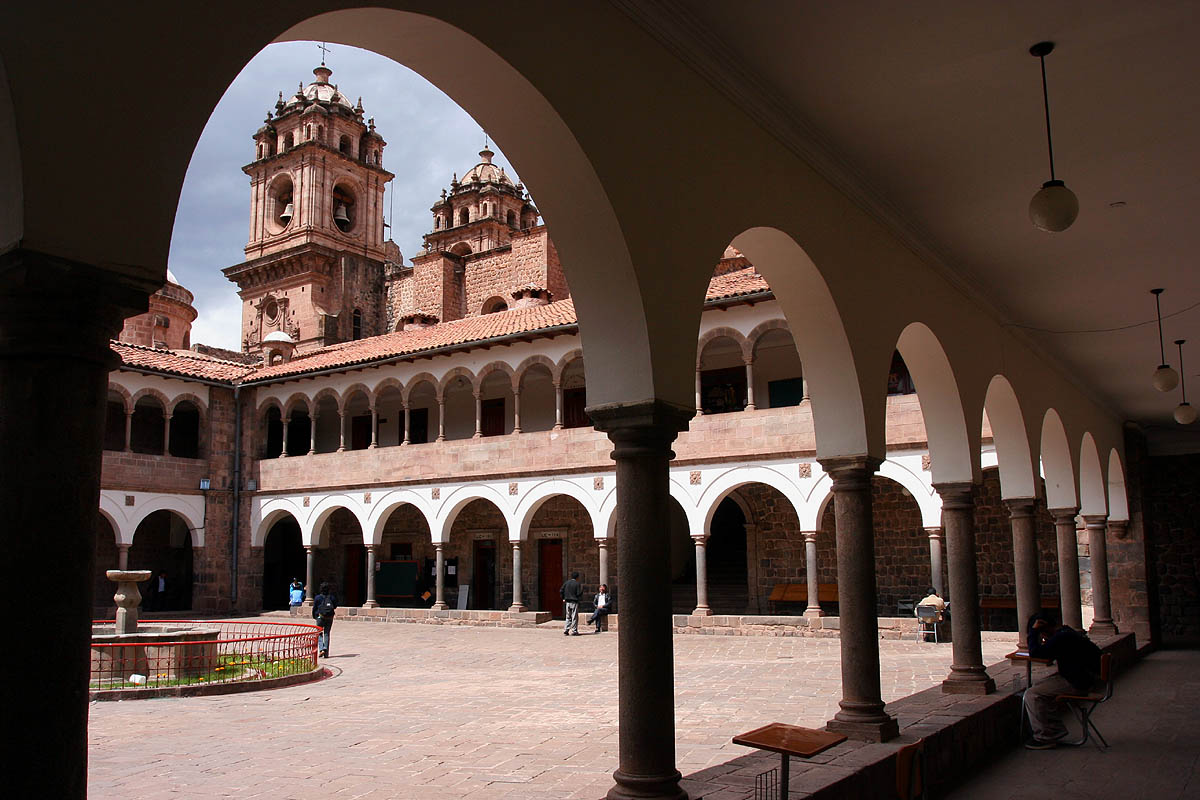
Old campus of the university San Antonio Abad in Cusco, Peru.

The list of universities established in the viceroyalties of the Hispanic America comprises all universities established by the Spanish Empire in the Americas from the settlement of the Americas in 1492 to the Wars of Independence in the early 19th century.

The transfer of the European university model to the overseas colonies in the Americas represented a decisive turning point in the educational history of the continents:

Nothing remotely resembling a university existed in the New World before Europeans arrived and settled there. Yet by the end of the eighteenth century, numerous universities and other institutions of higher education could be found in North, Central and South America. They had not been invented de novo; they were implants from the European university tradition and its stocks.

The Christian mission of the Indians and the increasing demand for skilled hands in the administration of the rapidly growing empire made the Spanish colonists realize the need to offer a university education on soil in the Americas. The foundation of a university required, following the medieval tradition, either a papal bull (or papal brief) or a royal privilege granting the right to confer academic degrees to the students. Usually a bestowment from both clerical and secular authorities was sought and achieved. Universities were all subjected to the king's supervision, only San Nicolas in Bogotá held the status of a private university.

The new foundations modeled their charters mainly on that of the University of Salamanca, the oldest and most venerable Spanish university. The curriculum of smaller universities was confined to the artes, a kind of basic studies, and Catholic theology (plus church law). A leading role was assumed by the gradually evolving full universities which additionally offered courses in medicine and jurisprudence, thus comprising all four classic faculties. The influential first universities were founded in the viceroyalties centers Santo Domingo, Lima and Mexico City. When it became apparent that the vast distances of the Spanish realm required a greater geographical spread of universities, they contributed to the creation of further foundations.

A key role in the development of the university system was played by the Catholic orders, especially by the Jesuits, but also the Dominicans and Augustinians. The founding and operation of most universities resulted from the – usually local – initiative of one of these orders, which sometimes quarreled openly over the control of the campus and the curriculum. The (temporary) dissolution of the Jesuit order in the late 18th century proved to be a major setback for the university landscape in Latin America, several of the suppressed Jesuit universities were reopened only decades later.

The successful export of the university, a genuine European creation, to another continent demonstrated its "extraordinary effectiveness and adaptability" as the highest educational institution and marked the beginning of its universal adoption in the modern age (see also List of the oldest universities). Yet there is no denying that at the end of the colonial era the intellectual and academic life in the younger colonial colleges of the British territories appeared more vital. Nevertheless, the Spanish universities in the Americas fulfilled their primary task, the education of the clerical and secular viceroyalty elite, and could thus assume an important function in aiding the development of the young republics after the separation from the motherland.

In Portuguese Brazil, by contrast, no university existed far beyond the colonial period (the first was established as late as 1912 in Curitiba as University of Paraná). The lower local demand for theological and legal specialists was largely met by Jesuit colegios, while students aspiring to higher education had to take up studies overseas at the University of Coimbra. Instead of universities for general studies, the Portuguese favored the creation of professional academies to respond to the local needs of technicians and skilled professionals, including creating the first school of higher studies in engineering of the Americas.

== List ==
The list is sorted by the date of recognition. At places where more than one university was established, the name of the institution is given in brackets.

=== 16th century ===
Founded	University	Modern country
1538; 1558	Universidad Santo Tomás de Aquino (Note: University foundation year and status open to dispute)	Dominican Republic
1551	National University of San Marcos	Peru
1551	Royal and Pontifical University of Mexico	Mexico
1552	La Plata or Charcas (Note: University status open to dispute)	Bolivia
1558	Santo Domingo (Santiago de La Paz y de Gorjón)	Dominican Republic
1580	Saint Thomas Aquinas University	Colombia
1586	Quito (San Fulgencio)	Ecuador

=== 17th century ===
Founded	University	Modern country
1613	National University of Córdoba	Argentina
1620	Central University of Ecuador	Ecuador
1621	Santiago (San Miguel)	Chile
1621	Cuzco (San Ignacio de Loyola)	Peru
1621	University of Saint Francis Xavier	Bolivia
1623	Pontifical Xavierian University	Colombia
1624	Real y Pontificia Universidad de Mérida (Yucatán)	Mexico
1676	University of San Carlos of Guatemala	Guatemala
1677	San Cristóbal of Huamanga University	Peru
1685	Santiago (Rosario)	Chile
1690	National University of San Antonio Abad in Cuzco	Peru
1694	Bogotá (San Nicolás)	Colombia
1696	Central University of Ecuador	Ecuador

=== 18th century ===
Founded	University	Modern country
1721	University of Havana	Cuba
1721	Central University of Venezuela	Venezuela
1733	Asunción	Paraguay
1738	Royal University of San Felipe	Chile
1744	University of Cauca	Colombia
1749	Universidad de San Francisco Javier (Panamá)	Panama
1749	Universidad Pencopolitana	Chile
1791	University of Guadalajara	Mexico

=== 19th century ===
Founded	University	Modern country
1806	University of the Andes, Venezuela	Venezuela
1812	National Autonomous University of Nicaragua	Nicaragua
1828	National University of Saint Augustine	Peru

== See also ==
- List of universities in South America
- History of European research universities

== Sources ==
- Jílek, Jubor (ed.): "Historical Compendium of European Universities/Répertoire Historique des Universités Européennes", Standing Conference of Rectors, Presidents and Vice-Chancellors of the European Universities (CRE), Geneva 1984
- Roberts, John; Rodriguez Cruz, Agueda M.; Herbst, Jürgen: "Die Übernahme europäischer Universitätsmodelle", in: Rüegg, Walter (ed.): Geschichte der Universität in Europa. Bd. II: Von der Reformation zur Französischen Revolution (1500–1800), C. H. Beck, München 1996, ISBN 3-406-36953-7, pp. 213–232
- Roberts, John; Rodriguez Cruz, Agueda M.; Herbst, Jürgen: "Exporting Models", in: Ridder-Symoens, Hilde de (ed.): A History of the University in Europe. Vol. II: Universities in Early Modern Europe (1500–1800), Cambridge University Press, 1996, ISBN 0-521-36106-0, pp. 256–284
- Tünnermann Bernheim, Carlos: "Historia de la Universidad en América Latina. De la Época Colonial a la Reforma de Córdoba", Editorial Universitaria Centroamericana, 1991, ISBN 9977-30-167-0
- Rüegg, Walter: "Foreword. The University as a European Institution", in: Ridder-Symoens, Hilde de (ed.): A History of the University in Europe. Vol. I: Universities in the Middle Ages, Cambridge University Press, 1992, ISBN 0-521-36105-2, pp. XIX–XX
- Guinness World Records Limited 2021. First University in the New World. Recuperado de https://www.guinnessworldrecords.com/world-records/first-university-in-the-new-world
