= History of European universities =

Logotype of the University of Bologna

European universities date from the founding of the University of Bologna in 1088 or the University of Paris (c. 1150–70). The original medieval universities arose from the Roman Catholic Church schools. Their purposes included training professionals, scientific investigation, improving society, and teaching critical thinking and research. External influences, such as Renaissance humanism (c. mid-14th century), the discovery of the New World (1492), the Protestant Reformation (1517), the Age of Enlightenment (18th century), and the recurrence of political revolution, enhanced the importance of human rights and international law in the university curricula.

In the 19th and 20th centuries, European universities concentrated upon science and research, their structures and philosophies having shaped the contemporary university. The French Ecole Polytechnique was established in 1794 by the mathematician Gaspard Monge during the Revolution, and it became a military academy under Napoleon I in 1804. The German university — the Humboldtian model — established by Wilhelm von Humboldt was based upon Friedrich Schleiermacher's liberal ideas about the importance of freedom, seminars, and laboratories, which, like the French university model, involved strict discipline and control of every aspect of the university. In the 19th and 20th centuries, the universities concentrated upon science, but were not open to the general populace until after 1914. Moreover, until the end of the 19th century, religion exerted a significant, limiting influence upon academic curricula and research, by when the German university model had become the world standard. Elsewhere, the British also had established universities world-wide, thus making higher education available to the world's populaces.

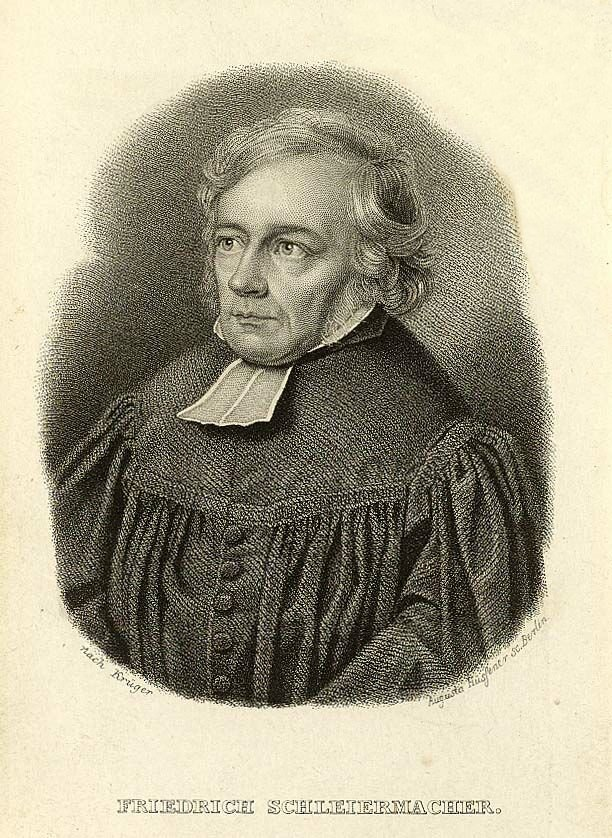
Friedrich Schleiermacher

== The first European universities ==
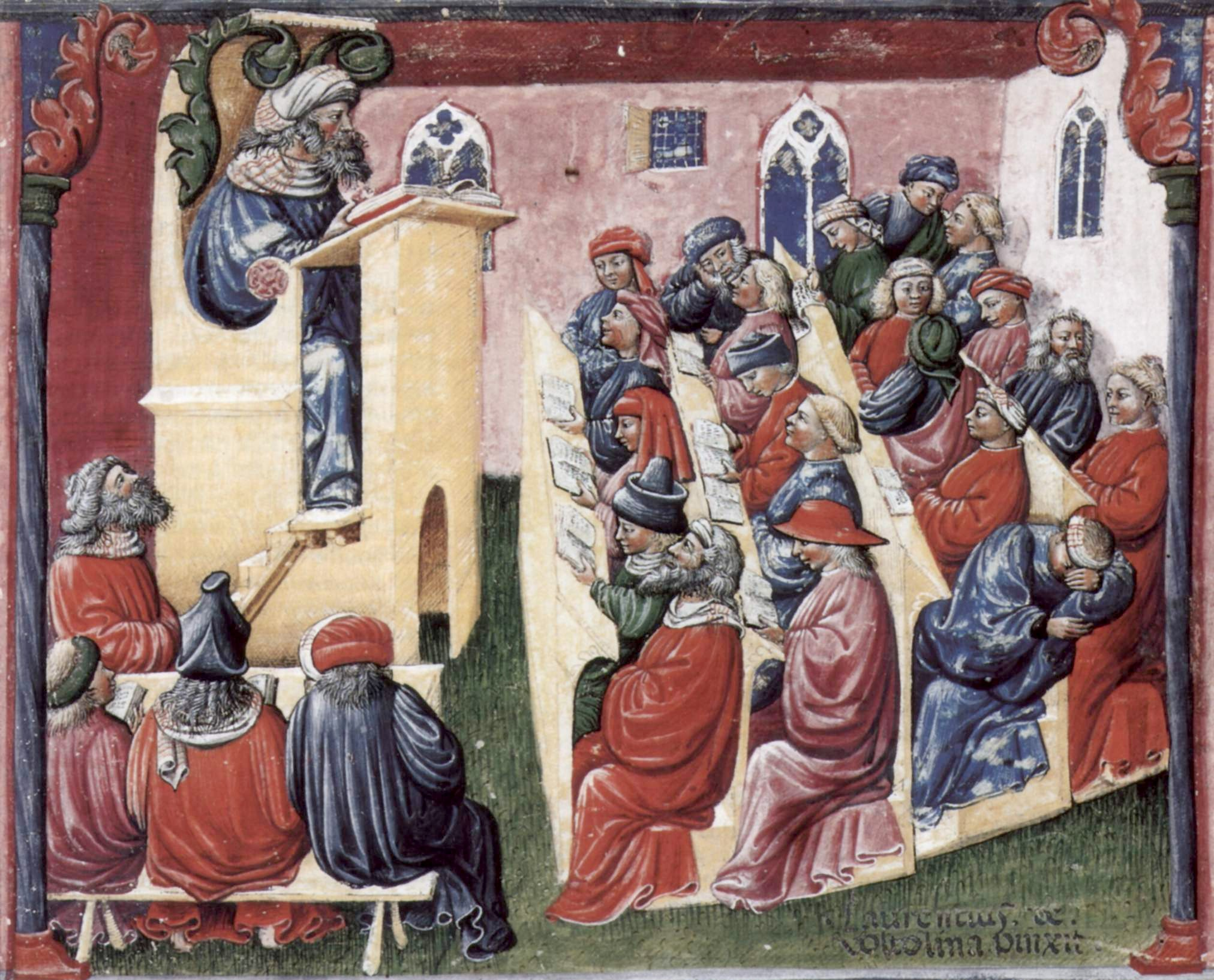
Representation of a university class, 1350s

Historically, the Bologna University, founded in 1088, is considered the "mother of European universities". However, the date of the University of Bologna's founding is uncertain. The university was granted a charter (Authentica habita) by Holy Roman Emperor Frederick I Barbarossa in 1158, but in the 19th century, a committee of historians led by Giosuè Carducci traced the founding of the university back to 1088, which would make it the oldest continuously operating university in the world. However, the development of the institution at Bologna into a university was a gradual process. Paul Grendler writes that "it is not likely that enough instruction and organization existed to merit the term university before the 1150s, and it might not have happened before the 1180s."

The first significant medieval university was the University of Paris, founded in 1150-1170. Its library was among the first to arrange items alphabetically according to title.

The rediscovery of ancient Græco–Roman knowledge (e.g. Aristotle's works and Roman law), led to the development of universitates (student guilds), and thus the establishment of the university in the contemporary sense. In turn, the traditional medieval universities — evolved from Catholic church schools — then established specialized academic structures for properly educating greater numbers of students as professionals. Prof. Walter Rüegg, editor of A History of the University in Europe, reports that universities then only trained students to become clerics, lawyers, civil servants, and physicians. Yet rediscovery of Classical-era knowledge transformed the university from the practical arts to developing "knowledge for the sake of knowledge", which, by the 16th century, was considered integral to the civil community's practical requirements. Hence, academic research was effected in furtherance of scientific investigation, because science had become essential to university curricula via "openness to novelty" in the search for the means to control nature to benefit civil society.

=== The structure and spread of early European universities ===
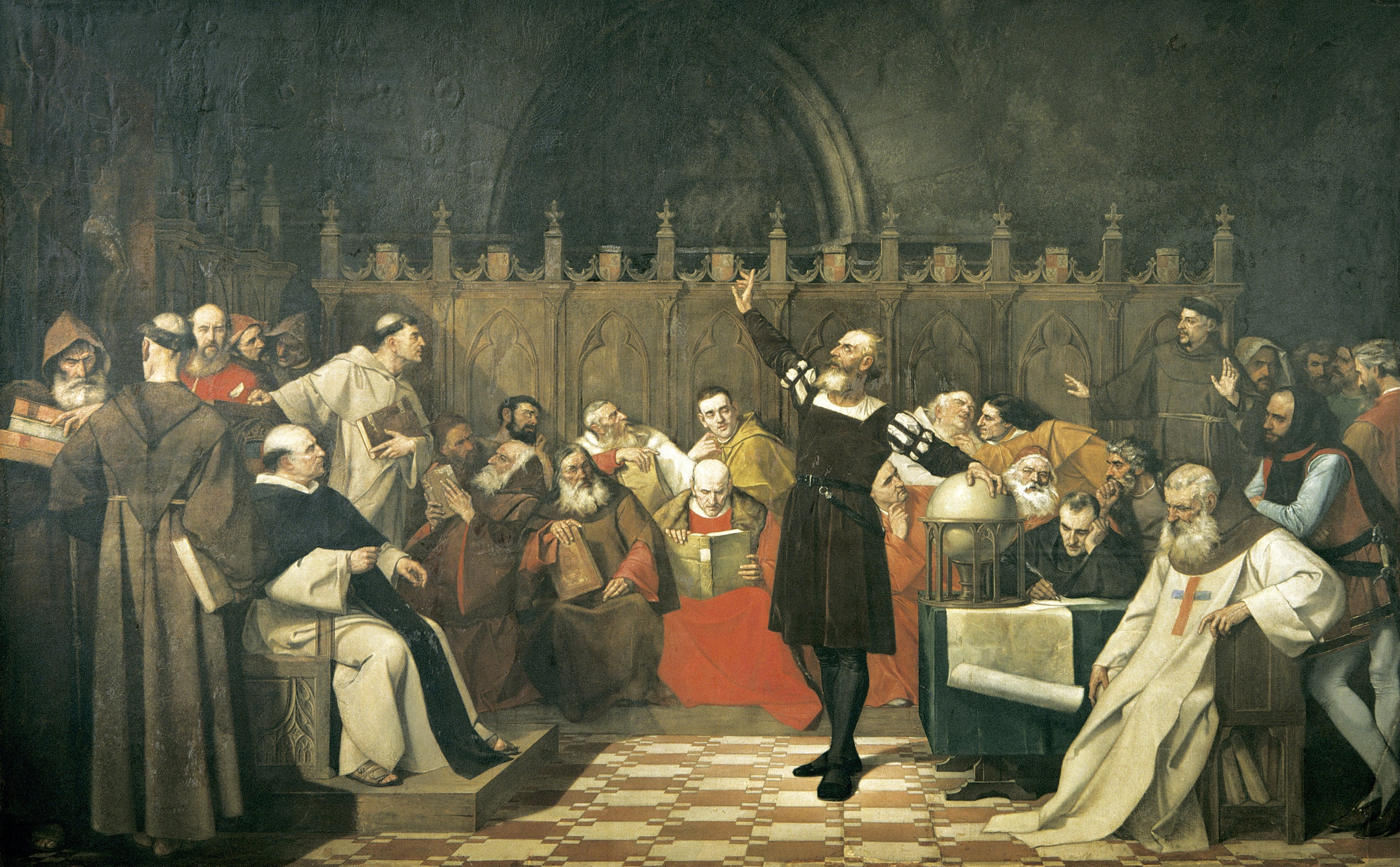
Christopher Columbus before the wise at the University of Salamanca

The European University proliferated in part because groups decided to secede from the original universities to promote their own ideals; the University of Paris fostered many universities in Northern Europe, while the University of Bologna fostered many in the South. Some leaders also created universities in order to use them to increase their political power and popularity. For example, Frederick II, Holy Roman Emperor founded the University of Naples in 1224 to train lawyers and administrators who could rival the University of Bologna's influence, which served the hostile Lombard League. And in 1218, King Alfonso IX founded the University of Salamanca, the oldest university in the Hispanic world and one of the oldest in the world in continuous operation.

The structure of these early classes involved a master reading from texts and commenting on the readings, as well as students learning by teaching other students. Masters also offered disputed questions to their classes for discussion. Moving into the 18th century, professors became less focused on simply training university teachers and more focused on "forming the minds of the elite" of a larger society.

=== Philosophic and external influences ===
By the 16th century, the humanist ideas of the Renaissance (14th–16th century) were slowly accepted; France had propagated them first to Germany, then to England, during the Protestant Reformation (1517). In that intellectual humanist mode, university education began including preparing the student for a civilized life — of culture and civility — and concern for society's public affairs. To achieve that, the curriculum comprised the liberal arts trivium (grammar, rhetoric, logic), and the quadrivium (arithmetic, geometry, astronomy, music) meant to prepare students for further specialized education in either theology, law, or medicine. In 1492, the socio-political consequences of the discovery of the New World expanded European university curricula, as human rights and international law became contemporarily relevant matters. The European enslavement of the native (aboriginal) populaces they conquered in the "New World" of the Americas eventually raised ethico-moral questions in Europe about the human rights of the American aboriginals — questions of cultural tolerance evinced by Renaissance humanism, the Bible, and mediæval theories of natural law. In analogy to the ancient world's works, Rüegg relates the "New World" idea to the idea of "new knowledge." It is worth pointing out, that Christopher Columbus's letter to Queen Isabella and King Ferdinand of Spain describing the native Taíno, he remarks that "They ought to make good and skilled servants" and "these people are very simple in war-like matters... I could conquer the whole of them with 50 men, and govern them as I pleased". The Catholic Monarchs rejected Columbus' enthusiasm for the slave trade, issuing a decree in 1500 that specifically forbade the enslavement of indigenous people. In the mid-16th century, scholarly and scientific journals made it feasible to "spread innovations among the learned"; by the 18th century, universities published their own research journals. In the 18th century, the Age of Enlightenment also encouraged education's transition, from the "preservation and transmission of accepted knowledge" to the "discovery and advancement of new knowledge"; the newer universities effected that change more quickly, and adopted Enlightenment ideas about the harmfulness of monarchic absolutism more readily than did the older universities.

== European university models in the 19th and 20th centuries ==
=== Modern universities ===
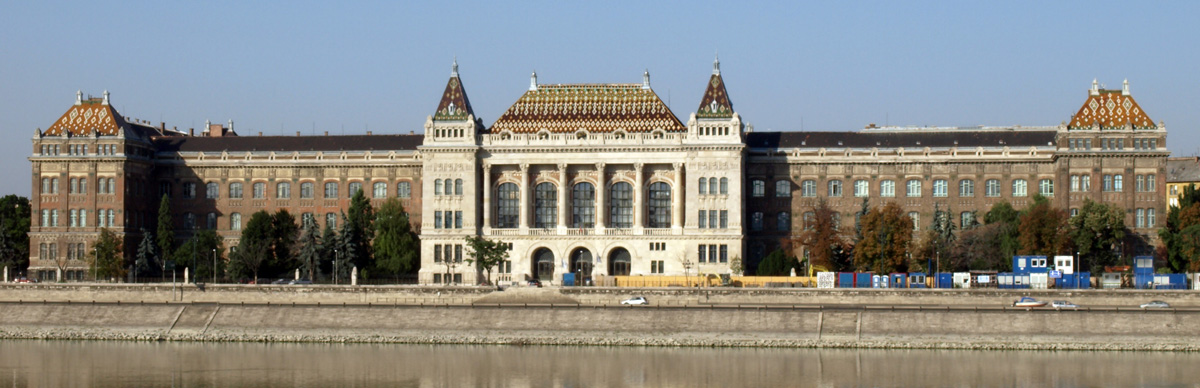
BME, the oldest University of Technology, founded in Hungary in 1782

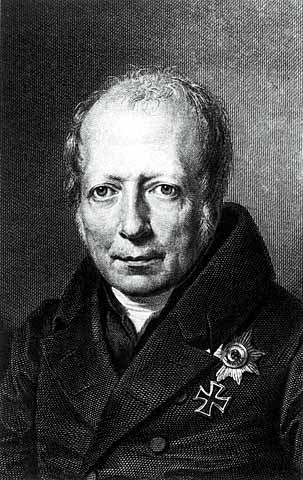
Wilhelm von Humboldt

Moving into the 19th century, the objective of universities evolved from teaching the "regurgitation of knowledge" to "encourag[ing] productive thinking." Two new university models, the German and the post-Revolutionary French Grandes écoles, arose and made an impact on established models such as the Russian and British - especially the newer foundations of University College London and King's College London. Both have been connected with the dawn of the Age of Enlightenment, the rise of the bourgeoisie during industrialization and the decline of classical medieval Scholasticism but used rather different approaches. Such free thinking and experimentation had notably already begun in Britain's oldest universities beginning in the seventeenth century at Oxford with the fathers of British scientific methodology Robert Hooke and Robert Boyle, and at Cambridge where Isaac Newton was Lucasian Professor of Mathematics & Physics.

The situation in Germany, or rather the various German states, was different. The specific German Bildungsbürgertum, which emerged starting in the mid-18th century with an educational ideal based on idealistic values and classical antiquity, had failed in gaining political power and in its aims for a nationalist movement. The Bildungsbürger turned to education as a means to construct a common national culture and strived for freedom against the nobility in power. Only when Prussia and its absolutist government had been utterly defeated by the Napoleonic armies in 1806 did the weakness of the defeated government allow for the Prussian reforms of the county's institutions. Wilhelm von Humboldt was appointed Geheimer Staatsrat (not minister as intended) of education in 1809 and held office for just one year. He nevertheless succeeded in drafting a complete reform of the country's educational system, including the primary Prussian education system in the de:Königsberger Schulplan and establishing the new University of Berlin. Based on Friedrich Schleiermacher's and his own liberal ideas, the goal was to demonstrate the process of the discovery of knowledge and to teach students to "take account of fundamental laws of science in all their thinking". Thus, seminars and laboratories started to evolve. Humboldt envisioned the university education as a student-centered activity of research:

Just as primary instruction makes the teacher possible, so he renders himself dispensable through schooling at the secondary level. The university teacher is thus no longer a teacher and the student is no longer a pupil. Instead the student conducts research on his own behalf and the professor supervises his research and supports him in it.

Early 19th-century American educators were also fascinated by German educational trends. The Prussian approach was used for example in the Michigan Constitution of 1835, which fully embraced the overall Prussian system by introducing a range of primary schools, secondary schools, and the University of Michigan itself, all administered by the state and supported with tax-based funding. However, some of the concepts in the Prussian reforms of primordial education, Bildung and its close interaction of education, society and nation-building are in conflict with American state-sceptical libertarian thinking.

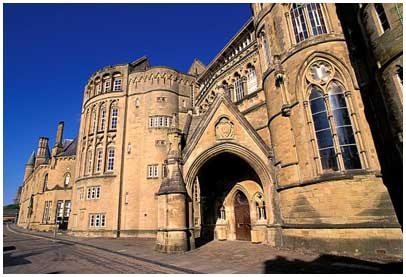
The main Entrance to Old College at Aberystwyth University

Freedom was an important concept in the German university model, and the system of professors was based on competition and freedom: although professors served as state functionaries, they had the freedom to choose between several states, and their identity and prestige arose from the specialization of scientific disciplines.

The French University model lacked the freedom of the German model, consisting of severe discipline and control over the curriculum, awarding of degrees, conformity of views, and personal habits (for example, there was a ban on beards in 1852). French university professors trained at the École Normale Supérieure, and much of their prestige depended on their schools' reputations. By 1866, though, the German model had begun to influence the strict French model. The École Polytechnique was established in 1794 by the mathematician Gaspard Monge during the French Revolution, and became a military academy under Napoleon I in 1804. Today, the institution still runs under the supervision of the French ministry of Defence.

The German university model was also used in Russian universities, which hired lecturers trained in Germany and which dedicated themselves to science. At the same time, Russian universities were meant to train the bureaucracy in the same way as the French grandes écoles. Throughout the 19th and 20th centuries, Russian universities underwent much variation in their degrees of strictness and control.

British universities of this period adopted some approaches familiar to the German universities, but as they already enjoyed substantial freedoms and autonomy the changes there had begun with the Age of Enlightenment, the same influences that inspired Humboldt. The Universities of Oxford and Cambridge emphasized the importance of research, arguably more authentically implementing Humboldt's idea of a university than even German universities, which were subject to state authority.

Overall, science became the focus of universities in the 19th and 20th centuries. Students could conduct research in seminars or laboratories and began to produce doctoral theses with more scientific content. According to Humboldt, the mission of the University of Berlin was to pursue scientific knowledge. The German university system fostered professional, bureaucratically regulated scientific research performed in well-equipped laboratories, instead of the kind of research done by private and individual scholars in Great Britain and France. In fact, Rüegg asserts that the German system is responsible for the development of the modern research university because it focused on the idea of "freedom of scientific research, teaching and study."

=== Professors and students ===
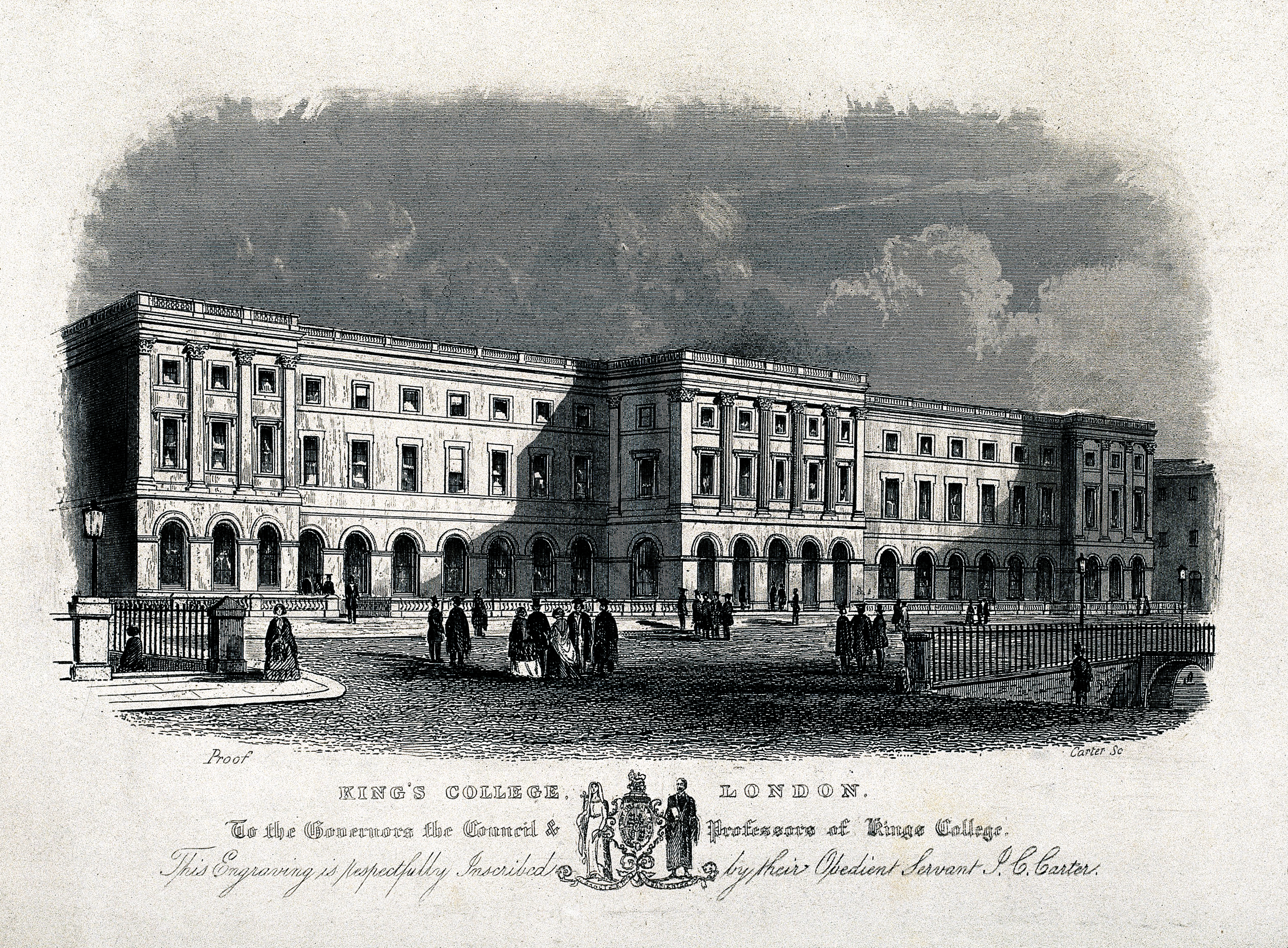
King's College London, as engraved by J. C. Carter in 1831. It was one of the two founding colleges of the University of London in 1836.

Schleiermacher posits that professors, had to "reproduce [their] own realization[s]" so that students could observe the "act of creation" of knowledge. That they serve as models of how to "intelligently produce knowledge". Professorship was awarded to distinguished scholars, and was rescindable only if guilty of a serious crime. From the perspective of James McCain, president emeritus of Kansas State University, professors in 20th-century Europe were more prestigious and well respected than university professors in the US, for having much academic freedom, whilst keeping to formal relationships with the students. Moreover, the professors' professional role expanded from lecturing to investigating, thus research became "an integral part of the professor's task".

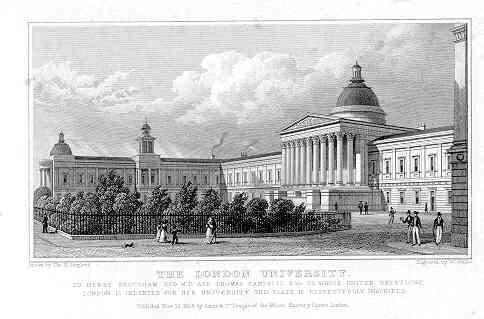
The London University, by Thomas Hosmer Shepherd (1827–28), now University College London, one of the two founding colleges of the University of London in 1836

Popular access to higher education slowly began after 1914, yet the principal remaining obstacle was its expense. For most of the 19th century, the UK continued affording a university education only to aristocrats, and not until the early 20th century, featuring new universities, such as the University of London, was higher education available to the mass populace. Moreover, it was not until the mid-19th century that universities admitted women students, who confronted incredibly great difficulties, such as having no civil rights and societal-institutional sexism doubting their intellectual capacities and their right to participate in a university education. In the event, the entrance of common students to the universities challenged the ideology of the German model, because their varied middle- and working-class backgrounds, hence different expectations, resulted in a less concretely Humboldtian university.

In the 19th and 20th centuries, European university students were mostly responsible for their educations; they selected courses of study, professors did not register attendance, and only gave examinations at course's end. Rüegg suggests that student propensity to developing student movements, based upon contemporary politics, parallels their attitudes of intellectual freedom and social responsibility.

Progressive educational and political philosophies changed religion’s role in the education imparted. During the 18th century, most universities were strongly connected to either a Catholic or a Protestant church, thus the professors’ and the students’ religion determined employment and matriculation. In the 19th century, religion was deleted from the "compulsory curriculum"; in France, Napoleon's secular Université de France troubled Roman Catholics, because it threatened their educational monopoly. To wit, the Loi Falloux (Falloux Law) of 1850 attempted to reinstate some educational power to the Roman Catholic Church, but, by then, the Université de France had de facto substantive control of French higher education. Likewise, in the UK, the new University of London was non-denominational, and the Oxford University Act 1854 and the Cambridge University Act 1856 removed religious requirements for students at the older universities with a concomitant decline in chapel attendance, and of religion as integral to a university education.

== The European university legacy ==
Ultimately, European universities established the intellectual and academic traditions of university education worldwide; by the 19th century's end, the Humboldtian university model was established in Europe, the US, and Japan. In the Americas, first the Spanish, then the British, and then the French founded universities in the lands they had conquered early in the 16th century, meant to professionally educate their colonists and propagate monotheistic religion, like Christianity, to establish formal, administrative rule of their American colonies; like-wise, the British in Canada, Australia, and the Cape Colony. Japan, the Near East, and Africa all had universities based on European models in the 19th century. Those universities disseminated Western European science and technology and trained the local population (foremost the local elite) to develop their countries' resources; and, although most promoted the social, political, economic, and cultural aims of the imperial rulers, some promoted revolutionary development of the colonial societies. In the 20th century, urbanization and industrialization made a university education available to the mass populace. Throughout, the basic structure and research purposes of the universities have remained constant; per Clark Kerr, they "are among the least changed of institutions".

== See also ==
- History of education
- History of Europe
- Red brick university
