= Jeffrey Docking =

President of Adrian College since 2005

Jeffrey R. Docking

17th President of Adrian College
- Incumbent
- Assumed office July 2005
- Preceded by: Stanley Caine

Personal details
- Born: 1960 (age 65–66)
- Spouse: Elizabeth
- Children: 4 children
- Education: Michigan State University; Garrett–Evangelical Theological Seminary (M.Div); Boston University (Ph.D.)
- Profession: College administrator

Jeffrey R. Docking is president of Adrian College. He has held that position since 2005. He previously worked as a senior administrator and men's ice hockey coach at Washington & Jefferson College.

== Biography ==
Docking grew up in Michigan, including a portion of time beginning in 2nd grade when his family lived in the Michigan State University dormitories while his father completed doctoral studies. During that time, he became a fan of the Michigan State Spartans men's ice hockey and worked as a stick boy. Upon completion of his studies, Docking's father became deputy superintendent of the East Lansing Public Schools.

Following undergraduate studies at Michigan State University, Docking worked for a short time as a reporter for WFSL-TV in Lansing, Michigan, covering the Michigan State Capitol. He left that position to attend Garrett-Evangelical Theological Seminary, where he earned a M.Div degree. He then attended Boston University to earn a Ph.D. in social ethics. To pay the bills during that time, he worked as a residence hall director for the Boston University dormitories.

He and his wife Elizabeth have four children, two of whom were born during the six years that the family lived in the Boston University dormitories.

== Washington & Jefferson College ==
During his career at Washington & Jefferson College in Washington, Pennsylvania, Docking served as dean of students. President Brian C. Mitchell appointed him vice president and special assistant to the president. In that position, he was a member of the "President's Cabinet" and was tasked with improving relations between the City of Washington and the college.

He also served as coach of the Washington & Jefferson men's ice hockey team for a time, leading the program to replace the old Washington Park ice rink with a new facility that was supposed to have been supported by municipal bonds from the city of Washington.

In 2004, he completed a fellowship at Carnegie Mellon University where he shadowed president Jared Cohon for a year.

== Adrian College ==
Docking became the 17th president of Adrian College in July 2005 He sought to improve the college's precarious financial situation by doubling the endowment. He proposed to improve the town and gown relationship by holding a "coffee hour" with the president, developing classes for senior citizens, and encouraging student internships in the community.

Early in his tenure, he introduced a mandatory four-year residency for all students "to raise funds," a marked departure from previous policies.
