= Connecticut shooting =

Connecticut shooting may refer to:

- Sandy Hook Elementary School shooting (2012)
- Hartford Distributors shooting (2010)
- Connecticut Lottery shooting (1997)
- Murder of Christian Prince (1991)
- Murder of Alex Rackley (1970)
- Joseph "Mad Dog" Taborsky's crime spree (1950s)
