= Knockout game =

Type of random assault to passersby

"Knockout game" is one of the names given in the United States for assaults in which a person (with others acting as accomplices or lookouts) attempts to make an unsuspecting victim lose consciousness with a single sucker punch. The assaults have similarities to the happy slapping trend seen in Europe, in which camera phones are used to record assaults. Other names given to assaults of this type include "knockout", "knockout king", "point 'em out, knock 'em out", and "polar-bearing" or "polar-bear hunting" (called such when the victim is white and the assailants are black). Serious injuries and even deaths have been attributed to the knockout game. Some news sources report that there was an escalation of such attacks in late 2013 and in some cases, the attacker was charged with a hate crime.

== History of attacks ==
The "Knockout game" became known after the murder of Yngve Raustein in 1992. Before 1992, the act of attacking and trying to "knock out" a person for entertainment also existed and was given different names, such as "wilding" or "One-Hitter Quitter" in the late 1980s and early 1990s.

In September 1992, Norwegian exchange student Yngve Raustein was killed by three teenagers who, according to Cambridge, Massachusetts prosecutors, were playing a game called "knockout". Raustein was stabbed after falling to the ground. Local teens said that the object is to render an unsuspecting target unconscious with a single punch and if the assailant does not succeed, his companions will turn on him instead.

In 2005 in the United Kingdom, BBC News reported on the happy slapping incidents, in which the attacks were filmed for the purpose of posting online. The French government responded to this trend by making it illegal to film any acts of violence and post them online, with a spokesperson for then President Nicolas Sarkozy saying that the law was indeed directed at "happy slapping."

In September 2009, in Decatur, Illinois, three teens were arrested and charged in the killing of a 61-year-old bicyclist who was stomped to death, as well as the attempted murder of another man, 46, who was also attacked and stomped. It was claimed that the teens were playing "point 'em out, knock 'em out," where a person is selected and a group of attackers attempts to render the victim unconscious.

In June 2009, a 29-year-old man was beaten in a Columbia, Missouri parking garage by a group of teens who told police that they were playing a game called "knockout king," where they would find an unsuspecting person and attempt to knock him out with a single punch.

In April 2011, a St. Louis, Missouri couple were attacked in what was described by a local CBS station as "part of the so-called knockout game". 72-year-old Hoang Nguyen died as a result of the assault and his wife, Yen (62), was badly injured. After the trial, assailant Elex Murphy, 18 at the time of the assault, was sentenced to life in prison plus 25 years.

In July 2012, 62-year-old Delfino Mora was attacked by three men and killed in West Rogers Park, Chicago. Anthony Malcolm, 20, who recorded the attack on his cell phone and publicized it, was sentenced to 30 years in prison. Nicholas Ayala, 18, was sentenced to 27 years. The third, Malik Jones, 21, was sentenced to 33 years. The attack was said to be part of a game called "pick 'em out, knock 'em out."

In 2013, a series of these attacks resulted in the deaths of the victims, all with some sort of game as a precipitating factor. Michael Daniels, 51, of Syracuse, New York died a day after being attacked in May 2013, with the "knockout game" later mentioned in regard to his death.

Ralph Santiago, a disabled homeless resident of Hoboken, New Jersey, was found dead after being attacked by three boys whose assault was linked to the "knockout" game.

Yale Daily News reported seven attacks during November 2013 in New Haven, Connecticut, that could be associated with the knockout game. Yale University's chief of police wrote an email to the campus community pertaining to the issue on November 21.

In the United States, The New York Times noted "a growing log of reports of such crimes in the Northeast and beyond". A number of news stories in late November 2013 covered incidents in Crown Heights, Brooklyn, where a series of attacks took place during October and November of that year.

As a result, the NYPD responded by stepping up patrols in certain neighborhoods.

On November 24, 2013, in Katy, Texas, an 81-year-old black man was attacked and hospitalized. Two weeks later, Conrad Alvin Barrett, 29, was arrested after allegedly showing an off-duty police officer a video he recorded with his cell phone of himself perpetrating the attack and explicitly referencing "knockout". Investigators revealed that there were other videos on his phone in which he used racial epithets and another in which he wondered if he would receive media attention if he were to commit a "knockout game" attack on a black man. This was one of the first cases in which the victim was black. Previous instances in the US primarily involved white or Asian victims and black assailants. The Justice Department subsequently charged Barrett with a hate crime, the only time the DOJ involved itself in prosecuting these attacks. Barrett's attorney claimed his client has bipolar disorder and was not on medication at the time of the attack. In October 2015, Barrett was sentenced to 71 months (5 years and 11 months) in federal incarceration. He also faced charges in state court.

In December 2015, a Hispanic man in New Jersey was reported assaulted by a Hispanic teen playing the "knockout game". The perpetrator turned himself in two months later and was ultimately sentenced to three years incarceration.

On July 27, 2016, in Milan, Italian police arrested a young Spaniard on vacation in Italy, after he made repeated assaults on passersby, similar to this "game". On that same date, in Greenville, South Carolina a man was attacked while playing Pokémon GO.

On August 29, 2016, a 30-year-old Guatemalan, Mardoquo Sincal Jochola, was fatally assaulted in Philadelphia and is alleged to have been a victim of the "knockout game".

On July 31, 2017, an unidentified man was caught on camera while knocking out a 24-year-old woman, Yana Rozanova, in Pervomaisk, Mykolaiv Oblast, Ukraine.

On October 1, 2020, alongside Central Park West, an unidentified black man was caught on surveillance video assaulting 67-year-old actor Rick Moranis with a single blow to the head.

== Antisemitic components ==
Several attacks on Jewish victims in Brooklyn in 2013 have been called antisemitic hate crimes. ABC Nightline reported that New York City police believed that antisemitism was likely to be a motive in the attacks, as all eight victims were identified as Jewish.

Jewish community leaders in Brooklyn have spoken out on the subject, and the Anti-Defamation League regional office issued a public statement on knockout attacks "targeting Jewish individuals in Brooklyn". Amrit Marajh, a 28-year-old suspect in an attack that took place in Brooklyn, was charged with a hate crime as his victim was Jewish. Marajh has claimed innocence and denied the claims of antisemitism.

On December 3, newly elected black Democratic New York City councilwoman Laurie Cumbo added a letter to her Facebook page saying: "The accomplishments of the Jewish community triggers feelings of resentment, and a sense that Jewish success is not also their success." The Anti-Defamation League said her post was "troubling" and that it evoked "classic anti-Semitic stereotypes." Cumbo later issued an apology for the remarks. Cumbo added that the lives of victims and suspects will never be the same and that attackers would be "prosecuted to the full extent of the law". NYPD Commissioner Raymond Kelly later stated that he was avoiding referring to the attacks as part of any sort of trend to avoid further copycat attacks and has instead been labeling them as hate crimes.

== Response ==
=== Government action ===
==== New York ====
On November 21, 2013 Republican New York State assemblyman Jim Tedisco put forward legislation called the "Knockout Assault Deterrent Act" to charge juvenile offenders in these types of attacks as adults, and would also punish those who were found recording the attacks. New York State Senator Hugh Farley (also a Republican) supports legislation that would make assailants linked to the knockout game liable to harsher sentences, would try juvenile offenders as adults, and would make accomplices criminally responsible. Democratic assemblyman John McDonald, while admitting stiffer penalties were warranted claimed Tedisco's bill was unnecessary.

==== Wisconsin ====
In Wisconsin, Republican State Assemblyman Dean Kaufert said he was considering drafting a bill to deter attacks.

=== Communities ===
After incidents during late 2013 in Brooklyn in which Jews were victims of knockout attacks, Jewish leaders, councilmembers, and organization representatives spoke against the attacks.

Leaders from the black community also made statements. New York City councilman Charles Barron stated that the root of the problem was a need for jobs to keep young people out of trouble; he also suggested additional funding for community patrols to act as lookouts. Representative Hakeem Jeffries said at a Crown Heights Youth Collective conference that attacks based on race will not be tolerated and that the collective will do everything in its power to see that justice is done. Brooklyn's then-District Attorney-elect Kenneth P. Thompson called out the attacks, saying that "there is no status to be gained" for knocking out an unsuspecting victim and that such violence will not be tolerated. Brooklyn Borough President-elect Eric Adams affirmed Thompson's statement, saying that, if you "play this game, ... you will lose".

Other notable New York City community members who have spoken against the attacks include Reverend Al Sharpton, Dov Hikind, Russell Simmons, Foundation for Ethnic Understanding founder Rabbi Marc Schneier, former NYC mayor David Dinkins and former New Orleans mayor and current National Urban League president Marc Morial released a video in December 2013 saying "No to K.O." Retired Brooklyn-born boxer Mike Tyson has also spoken against the attacks on The Piers Morgan Show.

== Criticism of reporting ==
The existence of a growing trend of knockout attacks has been questioned; claims about the prevalence of the phenomenon have been called an "urban myth" and a "type of panic" by some political analysts.

A June 2011 investigative report by John Tucker of the Riverfront Times following the death of Hoang Nguyen in 2011 saw many related attacks, all attributed to the "Knockout King" game. St. Louis Metropolitan Police Department Chief Daniel Isom stated that a year prior the police determined that the knockout game was played by a group of children who went around trying to knock random people unconscious. The police estimated the activity was not widespread and limited to five or nine teens. In Tucker's interviews with local teens, they believed the number to be much higher; one 18-year-old estimated 10-15% of his peers played the game. A St. Louis area barber said that in his youth the phenomenon was not called "Knockout King" but "One Hitter Quitter". Mike Males of the Center on Juvenile and Criminal Justice claimed that the media has been cherry-picking related attacks for sensationalism, asserting that "This knockout-game legend is a fake trend." Police at the time believed such attacks might have been under-reported by immigrant victims in communities where relations with law enforcement had been tense.

An attack from 2012 in Pittsburgh, Pennsylvania, was tentatively linked to more recent attacks, although it was never identified as part of any "game". Police in Syracuse, New York, reported that one assailant in a fatal attack admitted to its being "knockout", with a police sergeant noting that the assaults he was investigating were definitely "for a game" rather than being attempted murders or robberies.

On November 23, 2013, The New York Times reported that police officials in New York City were considering their position on the "game" and were wondering if they should advise the public, but had to contend with the uncertain existence of the game. Police in New York City questioned whether they were faced with a trend or a series of isolated incidents. Then-New York Police Commissioner Raymond Kelly refused to refer to the attacks in Brooklyn as the "knockout game" to avoid possible copycat attacks.

Several assaults associated with the knockout game do not follow any particular pattern; in several instances, a single assailant attempted a one-punch attack while in others multiple assailants participated in a gang attack. The "Knockout King" death of Nguyen in St. Louis was such a gang attack. A purported trend was identified in Lansing, Michigan, called "point 'em out, knock 'em out" involved the use of a Taser.

Many officials have outright refused to refer to the assaults as a "game", with Philadelphia Mayor Michael Nutter explicitly stating he did not want to give the idea any credibility while at a press conference after an attack at a Philadelphia pizzeria where the suspects never mentioned the game. In a CNN interview with Don Lemon, Nutter stated he was not sure if the knockout game is real or not, adding he less concerned about the name but saying the incidents are of "great concern" and could spark copycat behavior. Nutter would not answer if the attacks were racially motivated and stated that Philadelphia has no confirmed "game" incidents. Earlier, Philadelphia Police spokeswoman Tanya Little determined a November 11 attack as part of a knockout game.

Jamelle Bouie of The Daily Beast was critical of the game's existence as a trend, comparing its existence to the "wilding" assault allegedly at hand in the Central Park jogger case and the often reported headlight flashing urban legend. Although several people were attacked and one had died, Bouie pointed out that the attacks were not really rare, noting the FBI had reported 127,577 unarmed assaults in 2012.

Journalist Jesse Singal investigated the issue, and found that there was "in fact evidence to support the existence of a teen activity called Knockout—it’s not as though this is a media-manufactured hoax." At the same time, Singal noted that the motives were unknown for much of the "random, pointless violence" the media were associating with the game, and that despite widespread coverage of "young black men attacking people", there were no hard data on the extent of the actual "game". He revealed that CCTV footage of a man punching a woman from behind which aired on several local television stations in the US was in fact from East London. Singal concluded that, due to sometimes careless reporting, media coverage created a risk of "sparking unnecessary panic, some of it race-driven."

Chris Hayes, host of MSNBC's All In with Chris Hayes, gave the knockout game his first annual "Over-Covered Stories of the Year" award, due to what he perceived as excessive coverage by Fox News.

Robin Abcarian for the Los Angeles Times criticized this reporting style by a conservative analyst, saying that blame was shifted onto the federal government. Abcarian noted that Barrett explicitly stated he was seeking a black victim, and postulated that he may have been acting on this "lazy narrative that black teens were randomly attacking white people". She criticized the statement by Sharpton and the conservative news sources, which agreed with him after decades of opposition. Abcarian criticized the reporting of this attack as possibly being related to the knockout game trend, as the alleged attackers sought out Patterson because he was gay rather than because he is black. She also brought up a case of a fabrication of a "knockout"-style attack, after the victim and her boyfriend revealed she had lied that she was attacked at random by a stranger and instead he had struck her, noting that the St. Louis Post-Dispatch did not report the initial attack as a "knockout game" attack. Abcarian claimed that the 2011 attack by Dajour Washington on James Addlesburger was being used for sensationalism. The video of the assault was shown by Bill O'Reilly, which Addlesburger felt was being exploited and manipulated to fan racial hatred. Washington, who spent nine months in juvenile detention for the attack, appeared on Nightline in 2013 and claimed he had not attacked Addlesburger because he was white but rather because he was the only man present. Washington also claimed that at the time of the attack he had never heard of the "knockout game".

Tommy Christopher, writing for Mediaite, claimed James Rosen's report for Fox News on the attack was misleading, noting claims made by Rosen that it is the first such attack to be charged as a hate crime, when it was the first under federal statute. Christopher cited the arrest of Amrit Marajh in Brooklyn and the investigation of the alleged assault on Taj Patterson, a gay black man who claimed he was attacked by a group of Orthodox Jewish men, as proof of this.
