= Murder of Yngve Raustein =

1992 murder of Norwegian student at MIT

- Date: September 18, 1992
- Time: Evening
- Location: Memorial Drive (near Hayden Library), Cambridge, Massachusetts; 42°21′31.25″N 71°5′21.54″W
- Type: Murder, Robbery
- Cause: Stabbing
- Motive: Robbery
- Target: Yngve Raustein and companion
- Perpetrators: Shon McHugh, Joseph D. Donovan, and Alfredo Velez
- Outcome: Arrests and convictions
- Deaths: 1
- Injuries: 1
- Property damage: $33 stolen
- Arrests: 3
- Convictions: Second-degree murder, armed robbery
- Perpetrators were students at Cambridge Rindge and Latin School

Yngve Koehler Raustein (17 October 1970 – 18 September 1992) was a Norwegian undergraduate student at the Massachusetts Institute of Technology (MIT) in Cambridge, Massachusetts and a resident of Baker House.

On the evening of 18 September 1992, the 21-year-old was walking down Memorial Drive by Hayden Library when he and his companion were attacked by three students of Cambridge Rindge and Latin High School (Rindge and Latin).

Shon McHugh (aged 15), Joseph D. Donovan (aged 17), and Alfredo Velez (aged 18) robbed Raustein and his companion of $33. Donovan, unannounced, punched Raustein with such force that he broke his own hand, then McHugh stabbed the fallen Raustein repeatedly, causing fatal injuries. The three assailants were arrested within 1.3 miles (2.1 km) and 30 minutes, by the Boston University Police Department, after the three crossed Harvard Bridge to Boston and entered the grounds of Boston University.

== Impact on the community ==
MIT President Charles M. Vest issued a statement the next day. A memorial service for Raustein was held on 9 October 1992.

Raustein's murder was the first of an MIT student for over a decade and sparked a town and gown debate centering on the tension between the wealthy universities in Cambridge (MIT and Harvard University) and the less ambitious students of Rindge and Latin, who complained to a 3 October 1992 session of Cambridge City Council that those of them "who are not tracked for college were falling through the cracks".

This view was a surprise to Cambridge Mayor Kenneth Reeves, who pointed out that the high school had annual spending of $11,000 (equivalent to $25,200 in 2025) per student, double the state average, while school officials pointed out that the school did provide "22 violence-prevention programs and 40 extracurricular activities".

The session had been arranged by Mayor Reeves after students had been quoted in local newspapers dismissing Raustein as just another rich guy from MIT, who was no more special than other people who get randomly murdered in the city. Despite these various comments, a vigil and peace rally held on the MIT campus, on 22 October 1992, drew representatives from both communities, including students from Rindge and Latin.

== Legacy ==
A permanent memorial award, the Yngve K. Raustein Award, was established at MIT in 1993; it is presented annually to a sophomore student of the Unified Engineering courses in the Department of Aeronautics and Astronautics, "who, through outstanding achievement, personal improvement and/or overcoming of difficulties, best exemplify the spirit that Raustein brought to Unified".

In 2004, Raustein was an inaugural member of the Garden of Peace memorial near the Massachusetts State House in Boston, with his name engraved on a stone in the riverbed feature (section B).

== Judicial outcomes ==
McHugh was tried as a juvenile, and was released from prison after less than 11 years, while Velez – in a plea deal – testified against Donovan and was sentenced to less than 10 years in prison. Donovan was charged with felony murder and was sentenced to life without parole.

In March 1996, the Massachusetts Supreme Judicial Court (MSJC) declined an appeal of Donovan's conviction. In 2009, then 33-year-old Donovan unsuccessfully appealed against his sentence of life without parole for felony murder, in which he argued that, although he punched Raustein, he had no knowledge of a knife or planned robbery. Raustein's family said that "the life without parole sentence was way too harsh", while the effort to have the "without parole" overturned was also supported by the original trial judge and by one of the jurors from the trial.

It was not until a 2012 decision by the United States Supreme Court, which struck down life sentences without parole for juveniles, that this aspect of Donovan's sentence was addressed. This led to a December 2013 ruling by the MSJC, that such ongoing sentences in Massachusetts should be reviewed on a case-by-case basis.

In August 2014, the Massachusetts Parole Board decided then 38-year-old Donovan should be released after an additional six months in a rehabilitative program and one year in a lower level security prison. His release occurred in March 2016, when he was 40 years old and in his 24th year of incarceration; he will remain on parole, eligible for summary re-imprisonment, for the remainder of his life.
