= John Macerelli =

American football player (1930–1984)

No. 69
- Positions: Offensive guard, offensive tackle

Personal information
- Born: November 2, 1930; Muse, Pennsylvania, U.S.
- Died: October 12, 1984 (aged 53); Canonsburg, Pennsylvania, U.S.
- Listed height: 6 ft 2 in (1.88 m)
- Listed weight: 230 lb (104 kg)

Career information
- High school: Cecil Twp. (PA)
- College: Saint Vincent

Career history
- Cleveland Browns (1956)

Career statistics
- Games played: 12
- Stats at Pro Football Reference

John Edward Macerelli (November 2, 1930 - October 12, 1984) was an offensive tackle and offensive guard who played one season for the Cleveland Browns in 1956.
