= Thomas Terputac =

American judge

Thomas J. Terputac

Judge of the Washington County Courts of Common Pleas
- In office 1979–2007
- Succeeded by: Paul Pozonsky

Personal details
- Born: January 27, 1927
- Died: June 26, 2014 (aged 87)
- Education: University of Pittsburgh

Thomas J. Terputac (January 11, 1927 - June 26, 2014) is a former judge of the Courts of Common Pleas in Washington County, Pennsylvania.

== Biography ==
Terputac attended the University of Pittsburgh, graduating in 1953. He became judge in 1979. In June 2004, he was honored by the Pennsylvania Bar Association with their "50-year Member Award."

In 2007, he received the "Clarity Award" from the Pennsylvania Bar Association's Plain English Committee for "the use of clear writing by legal professionals," awarded in part for his authorship of a book on legal writing.

Terputac took senior status at the age of seventy, with his seat on the bench filled by Paul Pozonsky. He then retired from the court in 2007 after twenty-eight years as a judge.

== See also ==
- City of Washington–Washington & Jefferson College relations

== Bibliography ==
- Terputac, Thomas J. (1989). A handbook of English usage: a guide for the bench and bar. Brunswick Publishers. ISBN 978-1-55618-046-0.
