= Edvance Foundation =

Nonprofit organization

- Founded: 2011
- Founder: Brian C. Mitchell and Kurt M. Thiede
- Type: 501(c)(3)
- Purpose: Higher Education
- Location: Boston, Massachusetts
- Region served: United States of America
- Method: Donations and Grants
- Website: www.edvancefoundation.org

The Edvance Foundation is a nonprofit organization concerned with partnerships between public and private institutions of higher education throughout the U.S. It develops programs that aim to foster greater access and choice for college-bound students, and promotes best practices in institutional operations, management, and governance.

== Board of directors ==
- Arthur Rothkopf, Chair

Former Senior Vice President and Counselor to the President, U.S. Chamber of Commerce; Past President, Lafayette College

- Brian Mitchell, Director

Past President, Bucknell University

- Lydia Logan, Director

Senior Director of Policy, The Eli and Edythe Broad Foundation

== Programs ==
Programs administered by the foundation include:

- Advancing and supporting higher education
- Fostering collaboration among public and private institutions of higher education
- Strengthening local and regional relations between colleges and universities
- Creating efficiencies that support a breadth of strategic objectives including program development, resource allocation, strategic planning, and campus facilities management
- Establishing innovative, sustainable programs of regional and national significance

=== Community College Linkage ===
The Community College Linkage (CCL) is a program designed to encourage, facilitate, and support the enrollment of community college students at private colleges and universities nationwide. The program will provide counseling that enables those students to transition successfully into private four-year institutions.
