= Muse, Pennsylvania =

Unincorporated community in Pennsylvania, US

- Census-designated place
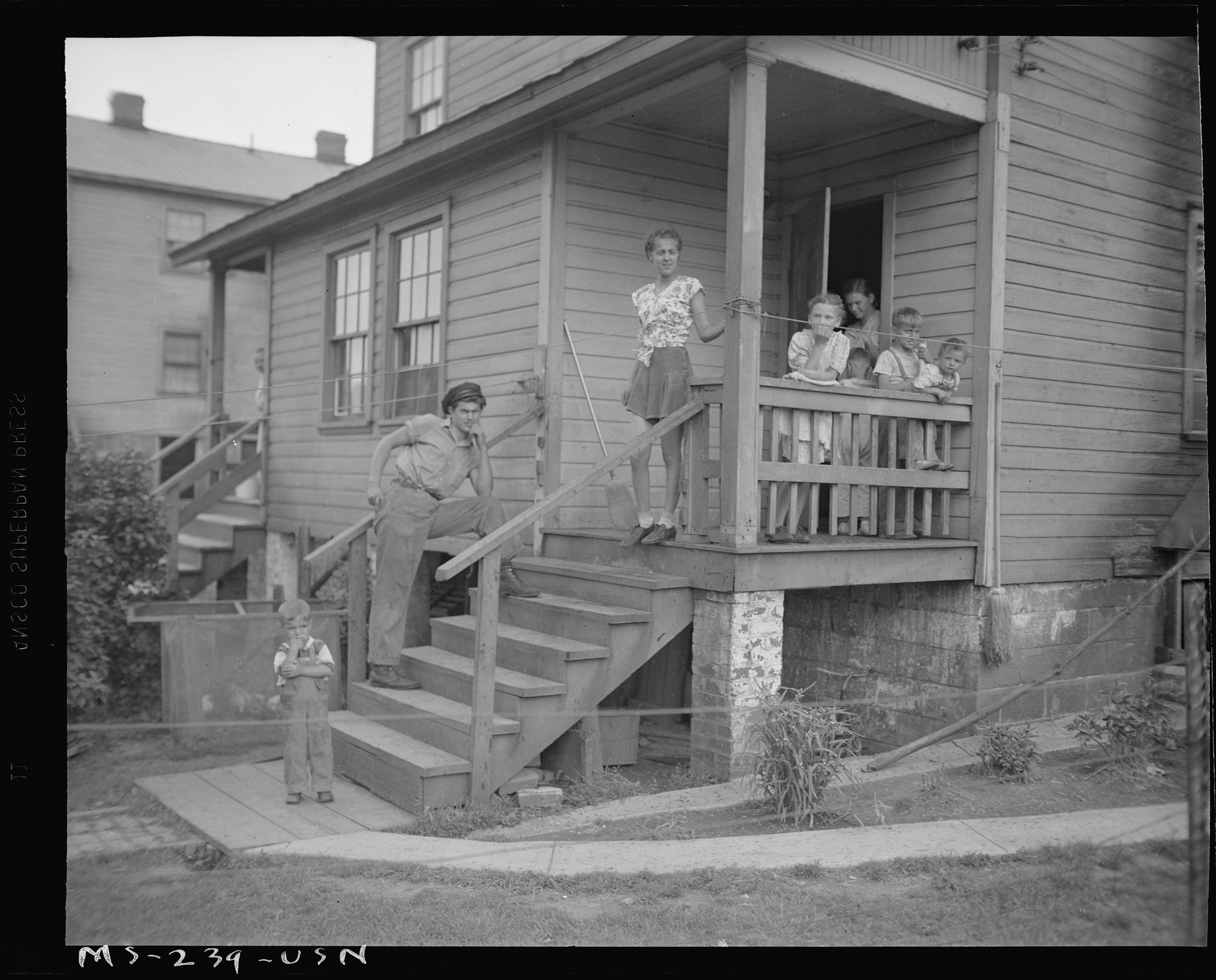
- Miner's family on porch of company home at H.C. Frick Coke Company in Muse, 1946
- Interactive map of Muse, Pennsylvania
- Coordinates: 40°17′34″N 80°12′02″W
- Country: United States
- State: Pennsylvania
- County: Washington

Area
  - Total: 1.55 sq mi (4.02 km^{2})
  - Land: 1.55 sq mi (4.02 km^{2})
  - Water: 0 sq mi (0.00 km^{2})

Population (2020)
  - Total: 2,525
  - Density: 1,626.4/sq mi (627.96/km^{2})
- Time zone: UTC-5 (Eastern (EST))
  - Summer (DST): UTC-4 (EDT)
- ZIP code: 15350
- Area codes: 724 and 878
- FIPS code: 42-52440

Muse is a census-designated place located in Cecil Township, Washington County, Pennsylvania, United States. The community is located in northern Washington County north of the borough of Canonsburg. As of the 2010 census the population was 2,504 residents.

== History ==
Henry Clay Frick's H. C. Frick & Company established Muse as a company coal town.

== Demographics ==
Historical population
Census	Pop.	Note	%±
2010	2,504		—
2020	2,525		0.8%
U.S. Decennial Census

== Notable people ==
- Paul Pozonsky, former judge of the Courts of Common Pleas in Washington County, Pennsylvania
- Ann Cindrić (1922–2010), pitcher in All-American Girls Professional Baseball League
- Doug Kotar, NFL running back for New York Giants
- John Macerelli, NFL offensive lineman for one season with Cleveland Browns
- Andy Seminick, MLB catcher, chiefly for Philadelphia Phillies
