= Ann Cindric =

- Pitcher
- Born: September 5, 1922; Muse, Pennsylvania, U.S.
- Died: December 18, 2010 (aged 88); Pittsburgh, Pennsylvania, U.S.
- Batted: Right Threw: Right

Teams
- Muskegon Lassies (1948); Springfield Sallies (1949–1950)

Ann Cindrić [tsindrich] (September 5, 1922 – December 18, 2010) was a pitcher who played from 1948 through 1950 in the All-American Girls Professional Baseball League (AAGPBL). Listed at 5' 6", 135 lb., Cindrić batted and threw right-handed. She was nicknamed ″Cindy″ by her teammates.

Born in Muse, Pennsylvania, Cindrić was one of five children in the family of John and Catherine (Yuric) Cindrić, of Croatian heritage.

Cindrić entered the AAGPBL with the Muskegon Lassies in 1948, appearing for them in just three games before her season was cut short by a chipped bone in one of her fingers. She did appear in a game when the team moved to Springfield, Illinois in 1949 and was renamed the Springfield Sallies.

Cindrić returned with the Sallies in 1950, when they joined the Chicago Colleens as touring player development teams. In her final season, she posted a 3–2 record and a .231 batting average for Springfield before another finger injury ended her baseball career.

Following her baseball career, Cindrić worked at Lafayette Manor Inc., Uniontown, while playing softball in Pennsylvania, Ohio and West Virginia. Cindrić later spent five years in the Dominican missionary convent and worked as a Dominican Missionary Sister in a nursing home office until her retirement.

Besides sports, Cindrić enjoyed playing the button box accordion and guitar in her leisure time, playing the button box with the International Button Box Club.

Since 1988, Cindrić is part of Women in Baseball, a permanent display based at the Baseball Hall of Fame and Museum in Cooperstown, New York, which was unveiled to honor the entire All-American Girls Professional Baseball League rather than individual baseball personalities.

Ann Cindrić died in Pittsburgh, Pennsylvania at the age of 88.
