= Adrian College =

Private liberal arts college in Michigan, US

- Type: Private liberal arts college
- Established: 1859; 167 years ago
- Religious affiliation: United Methodist
- Endowment: $60 million
- President: Jeffrey Docking
- Faculty: 95
- Students: 1,865 (undergraduate); 90 (graduate)
- Location: Adrian, Michigan, United States; 41°53′56″N 84°03′30″W
- Campus: Small town, 100 acres (0.4 km²)
- Colors: Black and Gold
- Nickname: Bulldogs
- Mascot: Bruiser
- Website: adrian.edu
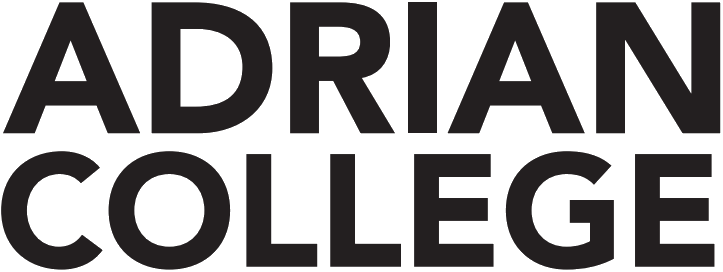

Adrian College is a private United Methodist liberal arts college in Adrian, Michigan. The college offers bachelor's degrees in 92 academic majors and programs. The 100 acre (0.40 km^{2}) campus contains newly constructed facilities along with historic buildings. Adrian College is affiliated with the United Methodist Church and is accredited by the Higher Learning Commission. The spring 2020–21 enrollment was 1,677 students.

== History ==
The college has its origin as a theological institute founded by Wesleyan Methodists at Leoni, Michigan, in 1845. This institution merged with Leoni Seminary, another Methodist school, in 1855 to form Michigan Union College. In 1859, that institution closed and its assets were transferred to Adrian "through the efforts of the antislavery leader and educator, Rev. Asa Mahan, who was elected first president of the new Adrian College". The college was chartered by the Michigan Legislature on March 28, 1859. In the early stages of the Civil War the college volunteered itself as a base for the formation of Michigan regiments for the Union side. The current Valade Hall building sits on the site of the former base camp for these soldiers.

A marker designating the college as a Michigan Historic Site was erected by the Michigan Historical Commission. The inscription reads:

Chartered on March 28, 1859, Adrian College traces its origins back to a Wesleyan Methodist theological institute founded at Leoni, Michigan in 1845. This institution later became Michigan Union College. Strongly antislavery in its sentiments, the school was moved to Adrian in 1859 through the efforts of the antislavery leader and educator, Rev. Asa Mahan, who was elected first president of the new Adrian College. The college was transferred to the Methodist Protestant Church in 1868, and here for 71 years, leaders of this denomination were trained. In 1939 a denominational union of American Methodism resulted in the establishment of the Methodist Church. Adrian College is affiliated with this great church body.

An additional marker commemorating Camp Williams and the Fourth Michigan Volunteer Infantry as a Michigan Historic Site was erected by the Michigan Historical Commission. The inscriptions read:

Camp Williams

At the outbreak of the Civil War in early 1861, the trustees of Adrian College offered the use of campus buildings and grounds to the Fourth Michigan Volunteer Infantry for training. This became known as Camp Williams. The city of Adrian donated money to build a mess and dining hall. By early June ten companies of the Fourth had arrived and started their training. The 1,025 soldiers came from Adrian, Ann Arbor, Dexter, Jonesville, Hudson, Sturgis, Monroe, Hillsdale, Tecumseh, and Trenton. On June 21 nearly 30,000 people came to town to see the Fourth depart for Washington. The ladies of Adrian presented Colonel Dwight Woodbury with the regimental flag. Sewn into the flag was "The Ladies of Adrian to the Fourth regiment Defend It."

Fourth Michigan Volunteer Infantry

In spring 1861 the Fourth Michigan Volunteer Infantry departed Adrians' Camp Williams for service in the Civil War. The regiment was assigned to the Army of the Potomac and saw action in forty-one engagements, including Gaines Mills, Fredericksburg, Chancellorsville, and Petersburg. The Fourth was one of the few regiments to lose more men in battle than from disease. Out of 1,399 men, 307 died from May 1862 through June 1864. Three colonels died in battle defending their regimental flag: Dwight Woodbury, at Malvern Hill, Virginia; Harrison Jeffords in The Wheatfield at Gettysburg; and George Lumbard at The Wilderness, Virginia. In 1864 the reorganized Fourth trained here, at Camp Williams, once more.

== Campus ==
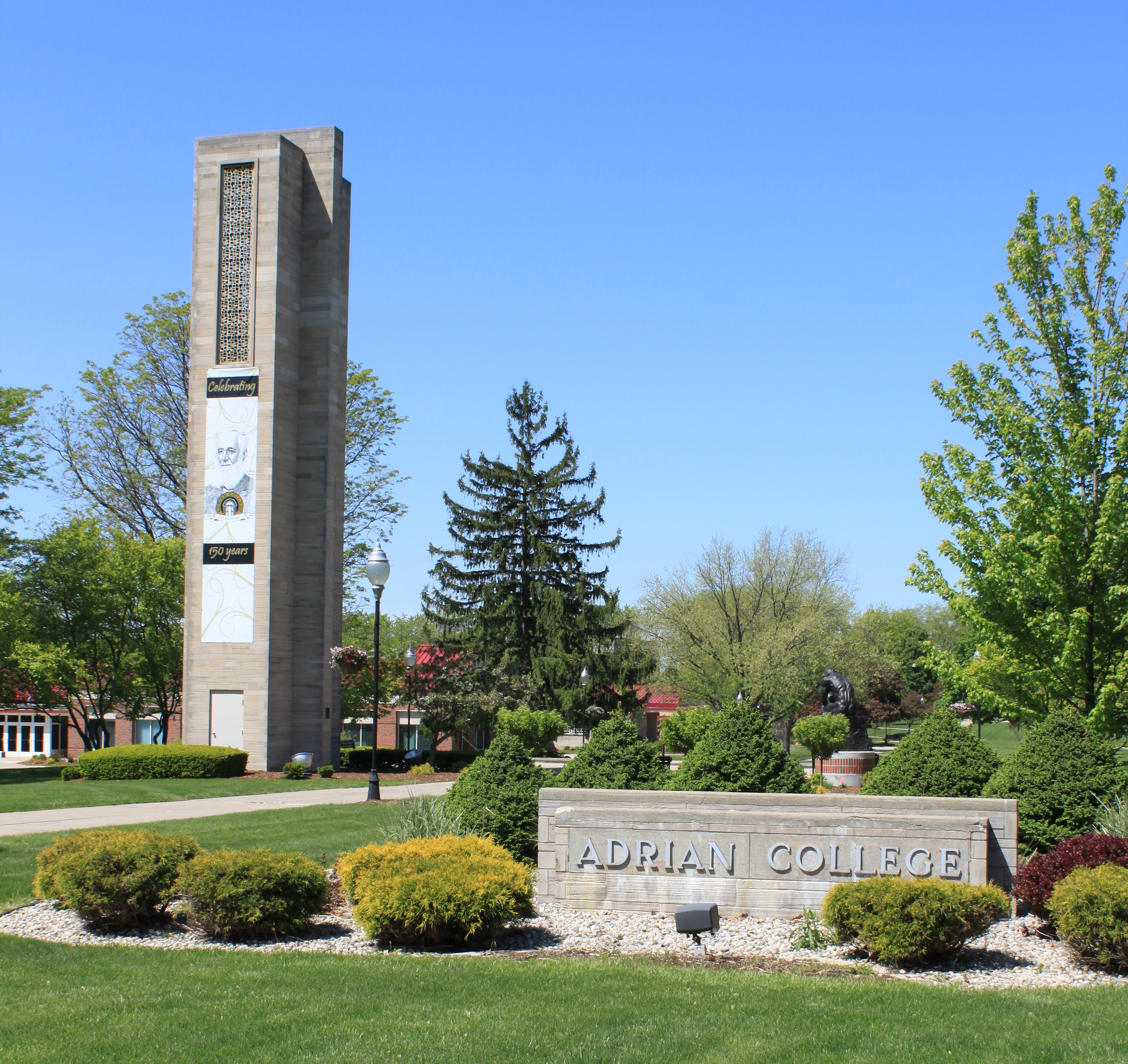
Herrick Tower

The original campus was built in the mid-19th century. It would be almost a century later that President John Dawson began a major construction phase of the campus, including most of the residence halls, academic buildings, a student union, and the administration building. More recently, current President Jeff Docking has introduced many plans to revitalize Adrian College and its campus, including the construction of new buildings, renovation of old ones, and programs related to athletics.

The college is making renovations and expansions to the Science, Business, Visual Arts, and Performing Arts departments.

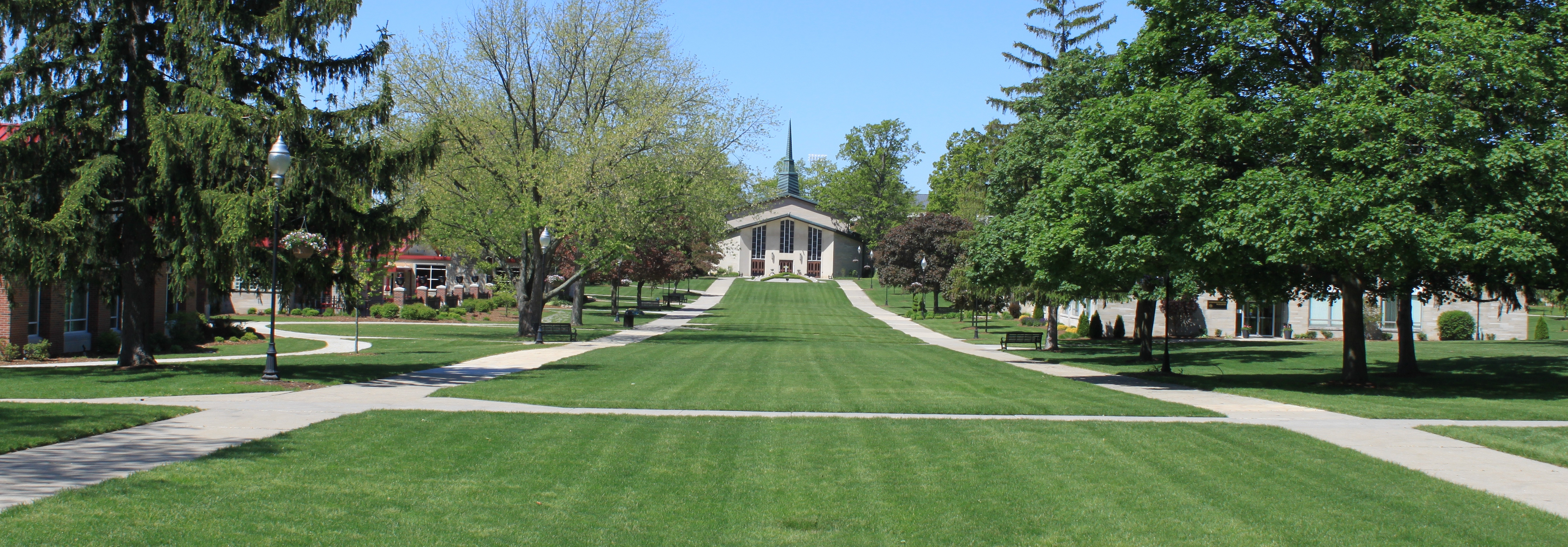
Herrick Chapel

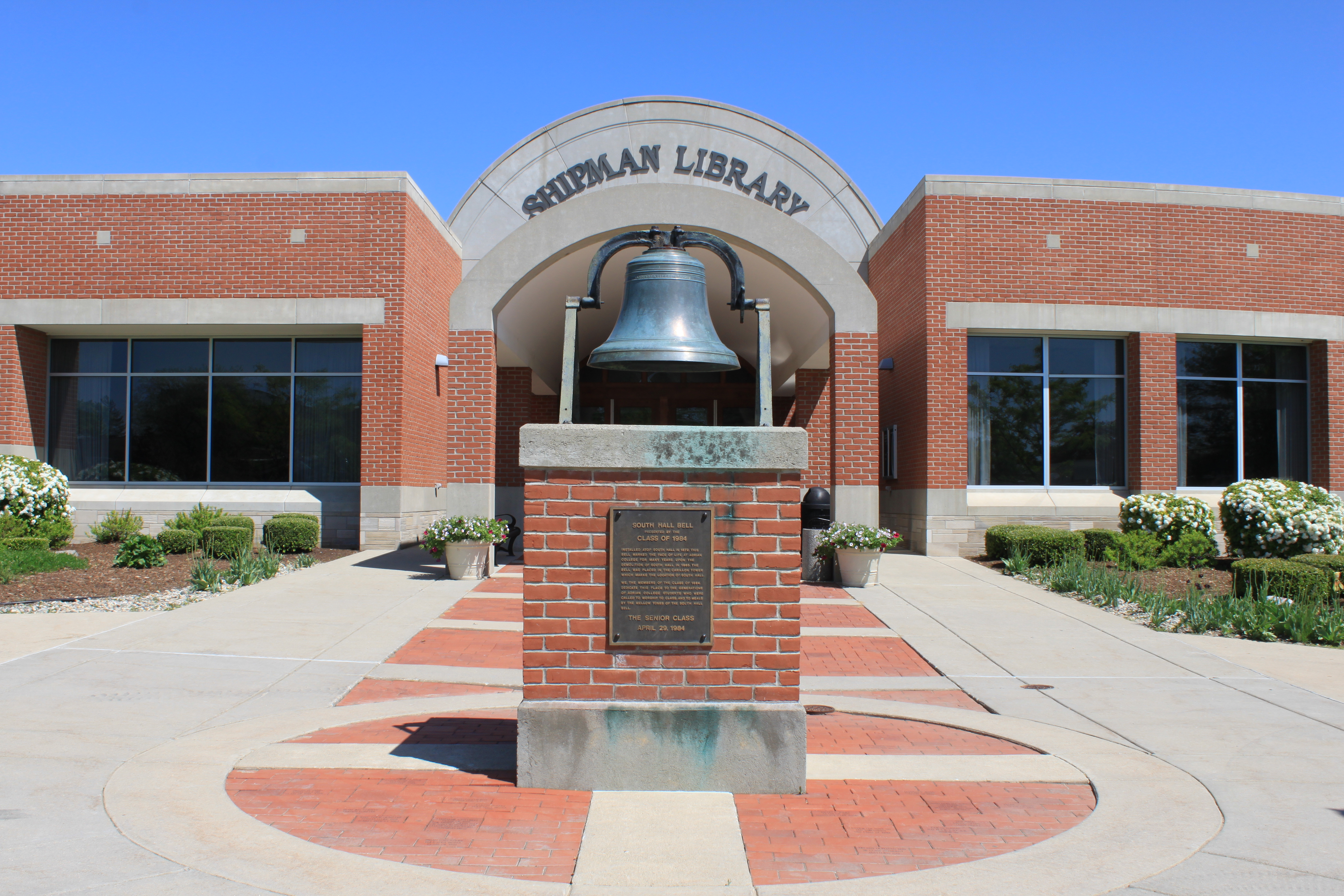
Shipman Library

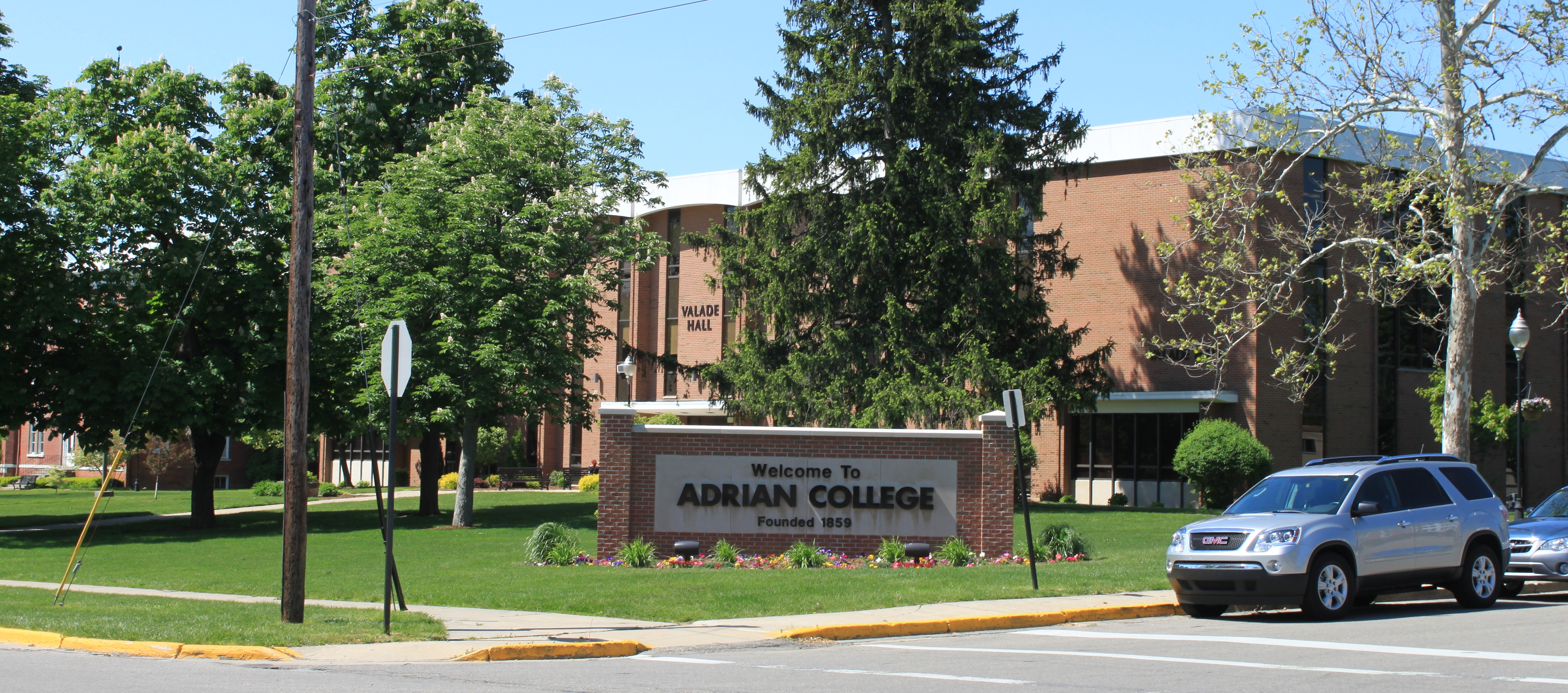
Valade Hall

== Academics ==
Adrian College offers over 90 majors and pre-professional programs. It also offers six graduate programs using a unique 4+1 structure for current students. Graduate programs exist in: Accounting, Athletic Training, Criminal Justice, Industrial Chemistry, Teacher Education, and Sports Administration and Leadership. Its most popular majors, as of 2021 graduates, were:

Marketing/Marketing Management (35)
Sports & Fitness Administration/Management (30)
Biology/Biological Sciences (27)
Exercise Science & Kinesiology (25)
Business Administration & Management (23)

Over the past several years eight of the nine academic buildings were renovated, and fundraising is currently being undertaken on the final building, Mahan Hall for Art and Interior Design. The following renovations have taken place since 2008: Rush Hall for Communication Arts, Goldsmith Hall for Modern Languages and Cultures, Spencer Hall for Music, Herrick Chapel, Jones Hall for Business and Humanities, Peelle Hall for Mathematics and Natural Science, Valade Hall for social sciences and humanities, and a historic renovation of the oldest building on campus, Downs Hall for theatre, built in 1860.

=== Institutes ===
Institutes are thematic centers focusing on areas of interest supporting the mission of Adrian College. As of 2015, there are eight institutes including Career Planning, Creativity, Entrepreneurial Studies, Ethics, Health Studies, Romney Institute for Law and Public Policy, Study Abroad, Sports Medicine, and Teacher Education. Each institute provides programming to students, faculty, staff, and wider community.

== Student activities ==
=== Athletics ===
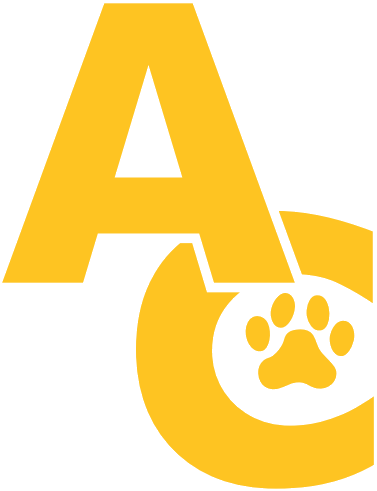
Adrian Bulldogs wordmark

Adrian College athletic teams, nicknamed the "Bulldogs", are part of the Michigan Intercollegiate Athletic Association and the National Collegiate Athletic Association Division III. The men's NCAA Division III hockey team is a member of the Northern Collegiate Hockey Association. The men's volleyball team joined the Midwest Collegiate Volleyball League. Adrian College is the third college or university to offer women's hockey as a varsity sport in Michigan. In 2011, the college reached an agreement with the federal Department of Education's Office of Civil Rights, resolving complaints that the college had violated Title IX. The college was found guilty of eleven violations of the law that governs gender equality, and agreed to make several changes to its athletic programs. Adrian College offers the following varsity sports:

=== Sports sponsored ===
Adrian expanded its athletic programs in the 2007–2008 academic year to add NCAA Division III men's and women's ice hockey and men's Division I ACHA hockey along with synchronized skating and NCAA Division III men's and women's lacrosse. The Bulldog's lacrosse program is the first varsity program in MI since the induction of Title IX. Women's bowling was added for the 2008-2009 year. Later, it added men's and women's rowing in 2018.

Men's sports	Women's sports
Baseball	Acrobatics and tumbling
Basketball	Basketball
Bass fishing	Bowling
Bowling	Cross country
Cross country	Equestrian
Football	Figure skating
Golf	Golf
Ice hockey	Ice hockey
Lacrosse	Lacrosse
Rowing	Rowing
Rugby	Rugby
Soccer	Soccer
Tennis	Softball
Track and field	Synchronized skating
Volleyball	Tennis
Wrestling	Track and field
	Volleyball
	Wrestling

==== Football ====
College football has been a part of the history of Adrian college since 1892, when Hillsdale College defeated Adrian by a score of 56–0. The first head football coach on record was E. E. Tarr in 1903. Since then, the program has won 16 conference championships, the first in 1911 and the most recent in 2012 and 2014. The head coach is Joe Palka who took over in 2024.

==== Men's ice hockey ====
The men's Division III team received national attention on the eve of Selection Sunday of the 2007–08 season on ESPN's "The Sports Reporters" as Mitch Albom, columnist from the Detroit Free Press, used his closing remarks to highlight the remarkable ride of the hockey team's season (their first at the NCAA level). The team finished 26-3 and did not make the NCAA Division III Tournament. They would qualify for the NCAA National Tournament nine times before winning their first NCAA Div. III National Championship on March 26, 2022, in Lake Placid, New York.

==== Men's and women's rowing ====
Men's and women's rowing were added in 2017. In 2018, Adrian College's rowing programs joined the Mid-Atlantic Rowing Conference (MARC). In 2018, the program welcomed an inaugural freshman class of 25 rowers.

==== Intramural sports ====
Intramurals are part of Adrian College and the athletic department. Some of the intramural teams include Flag Football, 5-on-5 Basketball, Coed Volleyball League, Broomball, 7-on-7 Soccer, and 3-on-3 Basketball.

=== Fraternities and sororities ===
Greek life on campus includes several fraternities and sororities.

== Notable alumni ==
- Lucien Baker, United States Senator from Kansas (1866)
- Virgil Bernero, mayor of Lansing and the 2010 Democratic nominee for governor in Michigan (1986)
- John E. Bird, member of the Michigan Supreme Court (1892)
- Rube Kisinger, pitcher for the Detroit Tigers
- James Laird, former Republican U.S. Representative of Nebraska's 2nd congressional district
- Mike Lewis, defensive end for the Iowa Barnstormers of the Arena Football League (2006).
- John Maulbetsch, College Football Hall of Fame member (1911)
- Bessie Leach Priddy, educator, social reformer, clubwoman, and leader of the Delta Delta Delta women's fraternity (1891)
- Mike Rogers, former Republican U.S. Representative of Michigan's 8th congressional district (1985)
- Henry C. Smith, former Republican U.S. Representative of Michigan's 2nd congressional district (1878)

== See also ==
- WVAC-FM
- Arrington Ice Arena
