= Paul Pozonsky =

American lawyer

Judge of the Washington County Courts of Common Pleas
- In office 1997–2012
- Preceded by: Thomas Terputac

Personal details
- Born: October 8, 1955 (age 70)
- Spouse: Sara Belle Crapuchettes (Div. Sept. 18, 2015)
- Education: West Virginia University; Duquesne University School of Law

Paul Pozonsky is a former judge of the Courts of Common Pleas in Washington County, Pennsylvania. In his capacity as judge, he presided over criminal trials, summary appeals, juvenile treatment court, and treatment court. After coming under investigation concerning missing drug court evidence, he left for Alaska and later resigned his seat. He pleaded guilty to three of six counts for which he was later indicted, and was sentenced to 30 days in jail.

== Personal background and early legal career ==
A native of Muse, Pennsylvania, Pozonsky graduated from Canon-McMillan High School in 1973. In 1977, he graduated magna cum laude from West Virginia University. After earning a law degree from Duquesne University School of Law in 1980, he practiced law.

He was elected magisterial district judge for the McDonald and Cecil Township areas in 1983. His campaign highlighted his legal experience. In that position, he president of the region's Special Court Judge Association of Pennsylvania. In 1997, he was nominated by the association for the prestigious John Jeffers Memorial Award, given to individuals who are "considered instrumental in leadership and professionalism in the courts."

His second wife filed for divorce on May 19, 2015, in Kenai, Alaska. The uncontested divorce became final on September 28, 2015.

== Career as County Judge ==
In 1997, he defeated Charles Kurowski in the election to replace retiring Judge Thomas Terputac. After his election to the county bench, he left the private practice that he had maintained while serving as a magisterial district judge. In 1998, he was selected to be one of 15 members of the ethics committee of the Pennsylvania Conference of State Trial Judges, which advises judges on ethical quandaries.

On March 29, 2004, Pozonsky dismissed 51 charges against a driver whose license had been suspended for 30 years.

In 2004, Pozonsky and Washington County District Attorney John Pettit established the county's first drug treatment court. Pozonsky was successful in his 2007 retention election. His campaign highlighted his high level of recommendation from members of the Pennsylvania Bar Association and his 9-year membership on the Ethics Committee of Pennsylvania State Trial Judges.

In 2011, Pozonsky presided over a case brought by a family who alleged their health was damaged by fracking petrocarbon wells drilled on property immediately adjacent to their home and the value of their farmstead was depressed. Four Marcellus Shale gas wells, compressor stations plus a 3-acre wastewater impoundment were located next to their 10-acre farm in Mt. Pleasant. The case was settled for $750,000 but Pozonsky barred the media from his courtroom and sealed the settlement file despite extensive efforts of the press to get its details released.

== Later career ==
=== Suspension ===
On May 24, 2012 Washington County's President Judge Debbie O'Dell Seneca issued an order suspending Pozonsky's drug treatment court. On May 31, she issued a subsequent order stripping Pozonsky of his criminal caseload, instead assigning him giving civil cases and nonjury trials. Previously, Pozonsky had been responsible for 60% to 70% of the county's criminal docket.

=== Tenure in Alaska ===
Shortly after the Judge President's actions, Pozonsky then left for a 2-week trip to Alaska, where his wife had family. On June 29, 2012, Judge Pozonsky resigned from the bench, citing discussions with, and the needs of, his family. In July 2012, Judge Pozonsky's attorney confirmed the existence of an investigation by the Pennsylvania Attorney General.

In October 2012, he was a questionable hire as a Worker's Compensation Board hearing officer by the Alaska Department of Labor and Workforce Development. His candidacy was accepted after the filing deadline had passed, and he lacked the resident's preference for the opening. His wife's family had deep Republican party connections, with his brother-in-law, Chuck Kopp who was briefly employed first as Governor Sarah Palin's Public Safety Commissioner, then as staff at the time to then-Senator Fred Dyson. She served on the Soldotna, Alaska City Council and the Alaska Commission on Judicial Conduct, and was close with former Lieutenant Governor Loren Leman. Under pressure, he resigned that post in December 2012. Then-governor, Republican Sean Parnell, ordered an investigation regarding the circumstances of his hire. By January 2013, the investigation was said to be continuing, but all parties publicly solicited for details denied knowledge of, and involvement in, the circumstances of the anomalous employment, including his being paid at what was a substantially higher rate than had been advertised. The Parnell administration denied access to critical correspondence regarding the matter that had been requested by the media, claiming exemptions over personnel privacy issues.

=== Charges ===
He was charged with stealing cocaine from evidence and numerous other offenses, in May 2013. Investigators said 291.2 grams (10.27 ounces) of cocaine was either missing, tampered with or replaced with baking soda. Though uncharged, considerable other case evidence went unaccounted for, including other drugs and cash, which Judge Pozonsky claimed to have personally destroyed, sua sponte. He challenged the search of his former Pennsylvania judicial office that revealed evidence of criminal conduct. A Pozonsky motion to compel testimony from Debbie O'Dell Seneca, the president judge who issued the administrative order to search his office and preserve evidence, was filed in June 2014. In a March, 2015 plea bargain, Pozonsky pleaded guilty to three of his six indictment counts and the prosecution did not request that he get jail time.

=== Sentence ===
Prosecutor Michael Ahwesh told Judge Daniel Howsare that Pozonsky "turned the courthouse into his stash house and made law enforcement into his private supplier of cocaine," decrying his arrogance in continuing to serve on the bench after he first entered drug rehabilitation. Pozonsky was sentenced to serve 30 days to 23.5 months in jail and 2 years probation, on July 13, 2015. He was immediately given work release and was released from jail on August 11, 2015. Pozonsky also forfeited his $98,000 annual pension and lifetime health benefits. The Pennsylvania Supreme Court temporarily suspended his law license on August 15, 2015. The Pennsylvania Supreme Court ruled 5-2 on January 18, 2018, to permanently disbar Pozonsky from law practice following the recommendation of the Office of Disciplinary Counsel, rather than suspending him, as he had requested. Justice Debra Todd, writing the majority opinion, said his conduct was particularly egregious, and had turned the court's proceedings that he had handled into "a shame and a farce." Justice Baer filed a concurring opinion in which Justice Donohue joined, noting that Pozonsky had notably failed to file any medical evidence connecting his conduct to his addiction, which might have resulted in suspension rather than disbarment.
