= John Pettit (attorney) =

John Pettit (July 13, 1935 – October 30, 2010) was a long-time district attorney of Washington County, Pennsylvania. He attended Washington High School, the University of Pennsylvania, and The Dickinson School of Law.

He and Judge Paul Pozonsky founded the county's first drug treatment court in 2004. He was criticized for using jailhouse informants during his 24-year-long tenure as district attorney, leading to a murder conviction being overturned. At the time of the 2007 defeat for re-election, losing to Steven Toprani, he was being investigated by the Federal Bureau of Investigation and a grand jury for preferential treatment to friends and political supporters as district attorney. Ultimately, he was never indicted.
