= San Luis Obispo Mardi Gras =

Major town and gown conflict

The San Luis Obispo Mardi Gras was a major town and gown conflict in San Luis Obispo, California. In late 2004, the city's leaders called for an end to public celebrations during Mardi Gras, hoping to end the event's reputation as a statewide party destination for college students.

Prior to 2004, tensions had grown as the small street parade held by community organizers evolved into a large-scale celebration that attracted thousands of partygoers, mostly students, from California and the Western United States. In 2004, a riot involving partygoers and the local police was widely televised on American newscasts. Local business and community members worried about bad publicity, potential violence, and the effect on local tourism. Many of the partygoers were not students from California Polytechnic State University ("Cal Poly"); instead, they were students from other cities and came to party in San Luis Obispo. After the riots, concerns regarding restrictive rules spread beyond the Cal Poly community to other Californian universities and student organizations.

== 2004 Mardi Gras riot ==
In 2004, police officers shut down parties hosted at Mustang Village, an apartment complex near Cal Poly. A police helicopter patrolled over Cedar Creek, an apartment complex that police had been called to during past celebrations. After the Mustang Village parties were closed down, an estimated 5000 people rioted, causing extensive property damage in neighborhoods along California Boulevard. Police officers arrested nearly 200 partygoers and used crowd control weapons to break up the rioting crowds.

=== Reactions ===
In response to the riot, the city council, mayor, and community members created "SLOMardiGras", a website and publicity campaign that called for an end to public Mardi Gras parties. "As a career emergency physician, I dread Mardi Gras like no other event," Dr. Steve Sainbury posted on the website, which also carried letters from the heads of Cuesta College and Cal Poly.

Then-mayor Dave Romero noted the event's positive history but observed that it had grown in size, with the post-riot cleanup in 2004 costing almost half a million dollars. He wrote, "This is not what San Luis Obispo is about, and as much as we like special events, our City Council concluded that Mardi Gras in San Luis Obispo must stop—completely... As your Mayor, I ask that those of you who live in San Luis Obispo help us protect our community from such destructive behavior. Please don't invite out-of-town guests to San Luis Obispo to party over Mardi Gras weekend... Encourage your friends who live here to enjoy the weekend in a safe and helpful way. If you don't live in San Luis Obispo, please don't visit us for Mardi Gras. MARDI GRAS IN SAN LUIS OBISPO IS OVER."

== Student concerns ==
=== Tripled fines ===
While the administration of Cal Poly supported the city's desire to quell the Mardi Gras celebrations, members of the student community were angered and concerned over new local ordinances that tripled fines for municipal code violations during Mardi Gras. According to the city's website, the San Luis Obispo Police Department, and city officials, alcohol-related offenses would be monitored closely, including underage drinking and public nudity. Cal Poly's Student Community Liaison Committee noted concerns regarding a smaller "safety zone" that would have tripled fines only in specific areas, including downtown and on Foothill and California Boulevards. The committee publicly endorsed the new safety zone, which comprised San Luis Obispo's entire city limits.

=== SB 337 ===
In February 2005, then-Senator Abel Maldonado introduced California Senate Bill 337 (SB 337), calling for the immediate dismissal of "any student convicted, pleading guilty to, or being adjudicated a delinquent minor with respect to specified rioting provisions of the Penal Code." Under the bill, students found guilty of rioting would be prevented from attending or being admitted to any Californian community college or college in the California State University system for at least one year.

The Associated Students of the University of California (ASUC) created a bill opposing SB 337, noting that it altered the Donahoe Higher Education Act and eligibility for Cal Grants, a form of financial aid. External Affairs Vice President Liz Hall, who wrote the opposition bill on behalf of ASUC, stated that the "UC Student Association opposes SB 337 as a threat to the rights of free speech and assembly of students."

== 2005 Mardi Gras ==
In preparation for the 2005 Mardi Gras, some students attempted to circumvent the new ordinances by creating an underground event called Polygras, which was discussed online from late 2004 to early 2005. To avoid fines and the large police presence planned for Mardi Gras, organizers planned for Polygras to take place immediately after the traditional Mardi Gras period. In response, the city of San Luis Obispo designated a city-wide safety enhancement zone effective through March 2, 2005.

In February 2005, sobriety checkpoints were set up throughout the city, and police officers sought to disperse medium-sized gatherings during Mardi Gras. Arrests decreased by 58% from the previous year. The costs of keeping the 2005 celebration under control totaled $1 million, including $385,200 in police department staffing and control costs. 16 other law enforcement organizations, such as the California Highway Patrol, billed an approximate $700,000 in additional staffing and crowd control costs. In February 2004, city councilwoman Christine Mulholland told a New Times reporter that the cost for law enforcement was approximately $100,000 in 2003. Some students congregated at traditional crowd spots during Polygras, but it was not an ongoing concern for the police.

== Sources ==
- 1. "SLO Mardi Gras Celebration Provokes Riot", Matt Dozier, Daily Nexus Online, February 23, 2004, retrieved February 5, 2006.
- 2. "SCALED-DOWN MARDI GRAS SEASON KICKS OFF", summary, San Luis Obispo Tribune, January 7, 2006, retrieved February 5, 2006;
- 3. "Voices", from the "SLOMardiGras" website, retrieved February 5, 2006.
- 4. "Minutes" (PDF). December 14, 2004. Archived from the original (PDF) on February 19, 2006.
- 5. "Cal Poly the Student Community Liaison Committee Endorses a Citywide Safety Enhancement Zone for Mardi Gras", news release, Oct. 29, 2004, retrieved February 5, 2005.
- 6.California State Senate Committee on Education, "SB 337 Senate Bill analysis by the California Senate Committee on Education", retrieved February 5, 2006.
- 7. "A Bill In Opposition to California Senate Bill 337, Spring 2005", retrieved February 5, 2006.
- 8. Archive of defunct PolyGras.com website, retrieved February 5, 2006. See also #9, which shows archived pages from PolyGras.com.
- 9. "Resolution Establishing a City-wide Safety Enhancement Zone until March 2, 2005," Council Agenda Report, City of San Luis Obispo, February 10, 2005, retrieved February 5, 2006.
- 10. "San Luis Launches Campaign Against Wild Mardi Gras," Kristina Ackermann, ''UCSB Daily Nexus'', February 4, 2005, retrieved February 5, 2006.
- 11. "Mardi Gras officials lower budget for crowd control," Leslie Griffy and Larissa Van Beurden-Doust, San Luis Obispo Tribune, January 24, 2006, retrieved February 5, 2006.
- 12. "$1 Million," Leslie Griffy,San Luis Obispo Tribune, May 28, 2005, retrieved February 5, 2006.
- 13. "Surveying the damage", Daniel Blackburn, New Times, February 25, 2004, retrieved February 5, 2006.
