= Steven Toprani =

District Attorney of Washington County, Pennsylvania
- In office 2007–2011
- Preceded by: John Pettit
- Succeeded by: Eugene Vittone

Personal details
- Party: Democratic
- Education: California University of Pennsylvania; Duquesne University School of Law
- Occupation: Lawyer

Steven Toprani is an attorney and former District Attorney of Washington County, Pennsylvania. He grew up in Carroll Township, Washington County, Pennsylvania. He attended California University of Pennsylvania, and The Duquesne University School of Law. He now resides in Monongahela, Pennsylvania.

Following graduation, he worked as an assistant counsel in the Pennsylvania Office of General Counsel at Pennsylvania Department of Public Welfare. He then worked in private practice at a firm in South Fayette Township, Pennsylvania.

In 2007, he ran against long-time District Attorney John Pettit; the campaign was described as "hand-to-hand" with a Toprani focusing on knocking on doors and built up grassroots support. Toprani, a Republican newcomer running for office in an overwhelmingly Democratic county. At the time, Pettit was being investigated by the Federal Bureau of Investigation and a grand jury for preferential treatment to friends and political supporters as district attorney, which became an issue in the campaign. Toprani received 65.5 percent of the vote. At the time of his election, he was the youngest District Attorney in the state. He was named 40 Under 40 by Pittsburgh Magazine. A longtime Republican and supporter of former Pennsylvania Governor, Tom Corbett, Toprani switched to the Democratic Party before running for State Representative in Pennsylvania's 49th Legislative District.

Following the election, Toprani found a District Attorney's office that had little technology, which he remedied with a $220,000 federal grant that was used to drug task force and obtaining electronic surveillance equipment.

He was generally well-regarded by law enforcement for his efforts. He implemented the first investigating grand jury in county history.

His tenure made him known for prosecuting corrupt police officers.

In March 2011, he announced a decision not to run for re-election. Following the end of his tenure as District Attorney, he joined the Leech Tishman law firm. In private practice, he was hired by the Pittsburgh Police to review procedures following the resignation of Chief Nathan Harper. He also represented former President of California University of Pennsylvania Angelo Armenti's wrongful termination lawsuit against the university.

Toprani is currently a member of the Ringgold School District School Board.
