= Hartford Distributors shooting =

2010 mass shooting in Connecticut, U.S.

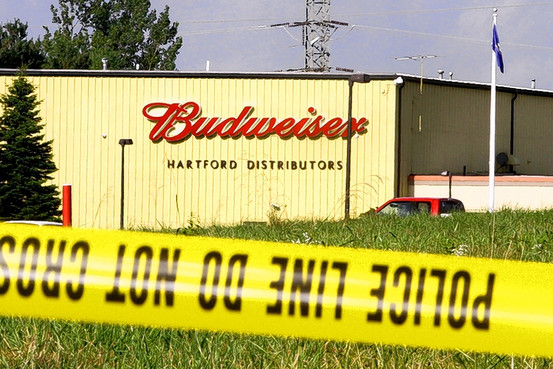
- Hartford Distributors after the shooting
- Location: 41.7979°N 72.5701°W; Manchester, Connecticut, US
- Date: August 3, 2010; 16 years ago
- Attack type: Mass shooting, murder–suicide, workplace shooting, mass murder
- Weapons: Semi-automatic pistols: 9mm Ruger SR9; 9mm Ruger P95 (unused)
- Deaths: 9 (including the perpetrator)
- Injuries: 2
- Perpetrator: Omar Sheriff Thornton
- Motive: Revenge for being fired

The Hartford Distributors shooting was a mass shooting that occurred on August 3, 2010, in Manchester, Connecticut, United States. The location of the crime was a warehouse owned by Hartford Distributors, a beer distribution company. The gunman, former employee Omar Sheriff Thornton (born April 25, 1976) shot and killed eight male coworkers before committing suicide.

== Shooting ==
Thornton, aged 34, was informed about an upcoming meeting at his place of employment a day before the shooting. While not being told the reason for the meeting, a witness recalled him "looking a little down and guilty". The meeting was for disciplinary reasons. Thornton had been recorded by a private detective stealing beer and loading it into a couple's vehicle on a previous occasion. He was also implicated in the theft of empty beer kegs. Hartford Distributors is a wholesale distributor of Budweiser beer products and wine.

The next day, Thornton arrived to work carrying a lunchbox containing two 9mm handguns (a Ruger SR9 & a Ruger P95). The meeting would start minutes later with general manager Steven Hollander, supervisor Louis Felder, and union representative Bryan Cirigliano entering the office. During the meeting, Thornton was said to be calm. He was also shown the video of himself stealing. Given the options of being fired or resigning, Thornton signed the resignation papers after asking questions about future job references. The meeting ended with a discussion about customers involved in stealing and confirming that Thornton would receive his final payment through the mail. The three men in the office escorted Thornton out of the building. While walking out, Thornton entered the kitchen and stated he was going to get a glass of water. Felder followed him there, while Cirigliano and Hollander continued down the hallway.

While in the kitchen, Thornton took out the Ruger SR9 from his lunchbox and opened fire. With his first two shots, he killed Louis Felder, who was standing just outside the kitchen pleading with Thornton. Thornton's first shot also grazed Steven Hollander's arm and face. Thornton exited the kitchen and fatally shot Cirigliano in the hallway with two shots. Thornton then ran to the warehouse. In the warehouse, Thornton first shot Douglas Scruton, who was on a forklift which ended up crashing into a wall and caught on fire. He then fatally shot Victor James and Craig Pepin. After shooting the three, Thornton chased Francis Fazio in the warehouse until he reached a trash compactor area where William Ackerman was working. Thornton fatally shot both of them. Afterwards, Thornton entered the "Breakage room" where he shot Edwin Kennison in the shoulder. Kennison ran away through the employee's entrance while Thornton chased him. The both of them were outside and ran onto the driveway. In the driveway, Thornton shot Jerome Rosenstein three times while he was driving past on a golf cart. Eventually, Kennison tripped outside the lobby entrance and pleaded with Thornton. Thornton fatally shot him two more times. A coworker who was outside with Thornton shouted at him to drop his gun. Thornton walked past the lobby entrance and reentered the building through the employee's entrance. Thornton walked to the main office area where he entered the office of a female coworker. He spared the coworker as she was suffering from multiple sclerosis. Thornton left the office and entered the lobby after noticing police officers outside. After entering the lobby, Thornton shot the glass door of the office area and reentered the offices. In one of the offices, he placed down his lunchbox which contained the unused Ruger P95. He moved to and locked himself in another office where he would remain until his suicide.

At the time Thornton started shooting, there were around 40 employees in the building. In just a few minutes, Thornton murdered eight coworkers and seriously injured two others. Many employees made calls to 911, with some callers identifying Thornton as the shooter. Police arrived on the scene just three minutes after the first 911 call. Police entered the building ten minutes after the first 911 call. Thornton promptly hid in a locked office. As more police entered the building, Thornton used a discarded cell phone to call his mother and explained to her what he had done. He told her he planned on turning the gun on himself. As police closed in, Thornton called 911, saying his motive for the massacre was racism he had experienced in the workplace. He told the 911 operator that he wished he had killed more people. Soon after hanging up and telling the police he was coming out of the room, he killed himself with a shot to the head. It is determined that Thornton had fired 26 rounds, including the suicide shot, from his Ruger SR9, only reloading once.

== Victims ==
Eight men were killed and two other men were injured in the shooting.

=== Killed ===
- Francis Joseph "Fran" Fazio, Sr., 57
- Douglas A. "Doug" Scruton, 56
- Edwin LeRoy "Eddie" Kennison, Jr., 49
- William Carl "Bill" Ackerman, Jr., 51
- Bryan Cirigliano, 51
- Craig A. Pepin, 60
- Louis Jeffrey Felder, 50
- Victor Thomas "Vic" James, 60

=== Wounded ===
- Steven Hollander, 50
- Jerome Rosenstein, 77

== Aftermath ==
Family members of Thornton have stated that he had complained to them that, as a Black person, he was being racially discriminated against at his job. Thornton's girlfriend, Kristi Hannah, claimed that he had seen a picture of a noose and a racial epithet written on a bathroom wall. Company and union officials as well as workers at the facility have denied the charges of racism. The union notes that he never filed a complaint with the union or any government agency. Forensic psychiatrist Keith Ablow stated, "I've evaluated plenty of murderers during my career... and I can tell you that people don't commit atrocities because of name-calling." A police probe did not find proof of racism at Hartford Distributors, with other minority workers at Hartford Distributors interviewed by the police disagreeing with Thornton's allegation that the company was "a racist place".

The massacre is the deadliest workplace shooting in Connecticut history and the second-deadliest mass shooting in the state, after the Sandy Hook Elementary School shooting that killed 26 people. Connecticut suffered a similar workplace shooting at the Lottery Headquarters in Newington on March 6, 1998, which left five dead including the shooter.

Christy Quail and Sean Quail were arrested for receiving the property alleged to have been stolen by Thornton. Sean Quail was arrested on August 17 in an incident where he sprayed bug-repellent at reporters covering the case. Quail was charged with three counts of first-degree reckless endangerment, three counts of third-degree assault, carrying a dangerous instrument, and breach of peace.
