= Murder of Christian Prince =

1991 murder

Christian Prince
- Born: Christian Haley Prince; July 18, 1971; Chevy Chase, Maryland, U.S.
- Died: February 17, 1991 (aged 19); New Haven, Connecticut, U.S.
- Cause of death: Shooting
- Resting place: Rock Creek Cemetery; Washington, D.C., U.S.

Christian Haley Prince (July 8, 1971 – February 17, 1991) was a Yale University student whose murder in New Haven, Connecticut, highlighted racial and class tensions between town and gown.

== Incident ==
Prince, the son of Edward and Sally Prince of Chevy Chase, Maryland, was a fourth-generation Yale student, a member of the class of 1993 in his sophomore year, in Pierson College. The evening of February 16, 1991, after having dined at Mory's and attending a party at Sterling-Sheffield-Strathcona Hall, Prince left his friends and began walking to his off-campus apartment on Whitney Avenue to rest for lacrosse practice the next day. Prince was found lying on the steps of St. Mary's Church, New Haven on Hillhouse Avenue, dead of a bullet wound to the heart, in the early morning hours of February 17. He was the first Yale student killed on campus since the murder of Gary Stein during a robbery near Grove Street Cemetery in 1974.

His death stunned the campus, and more than 1,000 people attended his funeral in Washington, D.C., where Prince's brother Ted, a Yale graduate, gave the eulogy. There was a short term significant decline in applications to Yale which was directly attributed to the murder. Yale's president, Benno Schmidt, resigned the following year after a contentious six-year term filled with myriad problems, including badly deteriorated town-gown relations highlighted by Prince's murder.

After the murder of Christian Prince, university administrators spent millions of dollars on security infrastructure. Emergency phones and improved lighting were installed; the university police department's size was expanded and a new security force was founded.

== Arrest and trial ==
In May 1991, James Duncan Fleming was arrested for Prince's murder on a tip from Randy Fleming, a non-related friend of James Fleming.

Randy Fleming was questioned by police and made these claims under oath:

He and James wanted money to attend a rap performance and James suggested they "stick up a cracker." James Fleming spotted Prince walking home and demanded his money at gunpoint. Prince handed over his wallet, whereupon James Fleming pistol-whipped him, said "I ought to shoot this cracker", and then fired his gun, fatally wounding Prince. James Fleming then dropped the wallet in his haste to escape.

A year later, at James Fleming's trial, Randy Fleming recanted his original statements, claiming that the police had forced him to lie. The jury convicted James Fleming on conspiracy to rob Prince, but acquitted him of murder and failed to return a verdict on charges of felony murder and attempted robbery. A second jury acquitted James Fleming on the latter two charges in March 1993, and Fleming was sentenced to nine years in prison for conspiracy to rob.
