= City of Washington–Washington & Jefferson College relations =

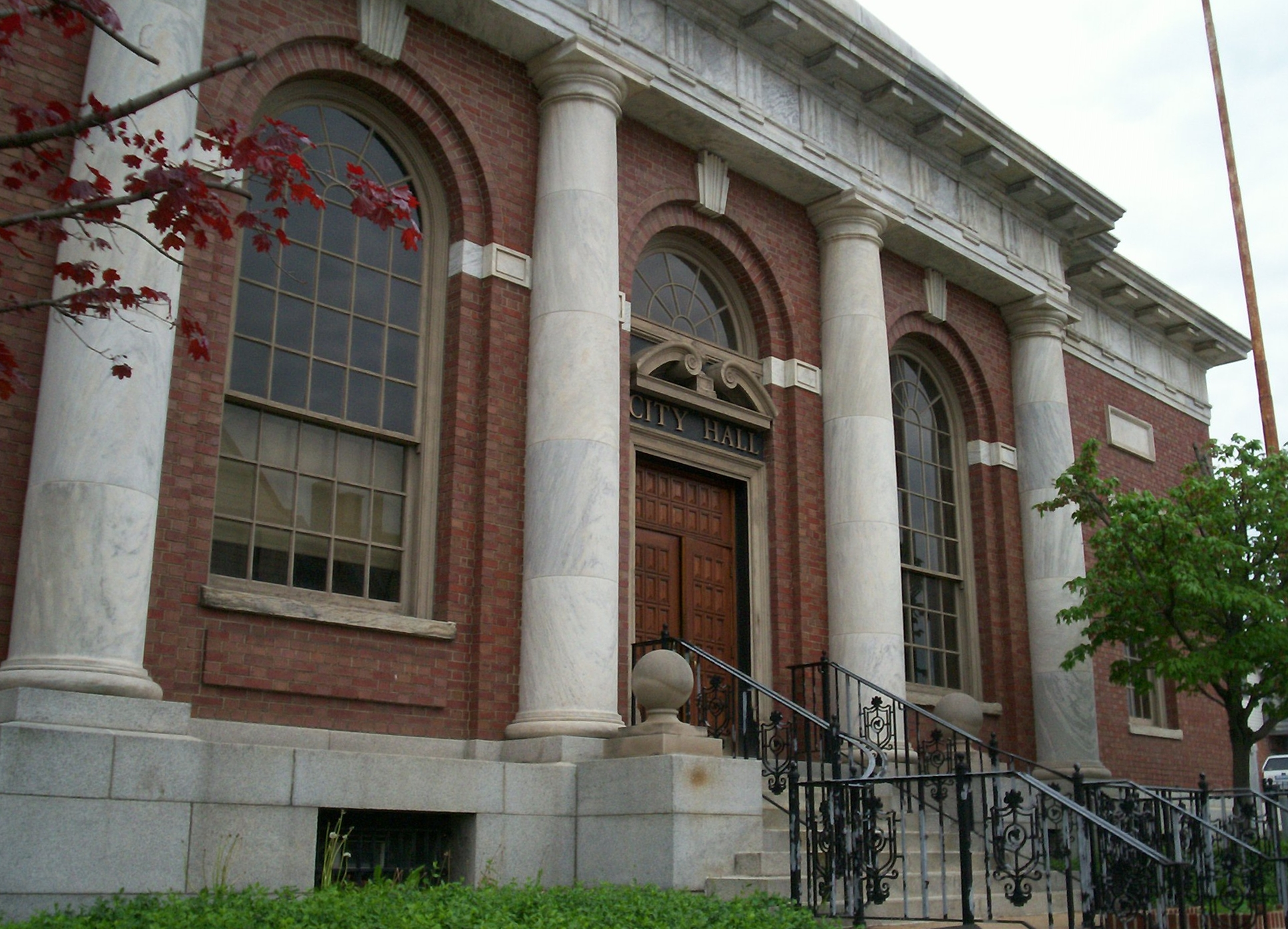
Town Hall in Washington, home to the city council and the mayor's office

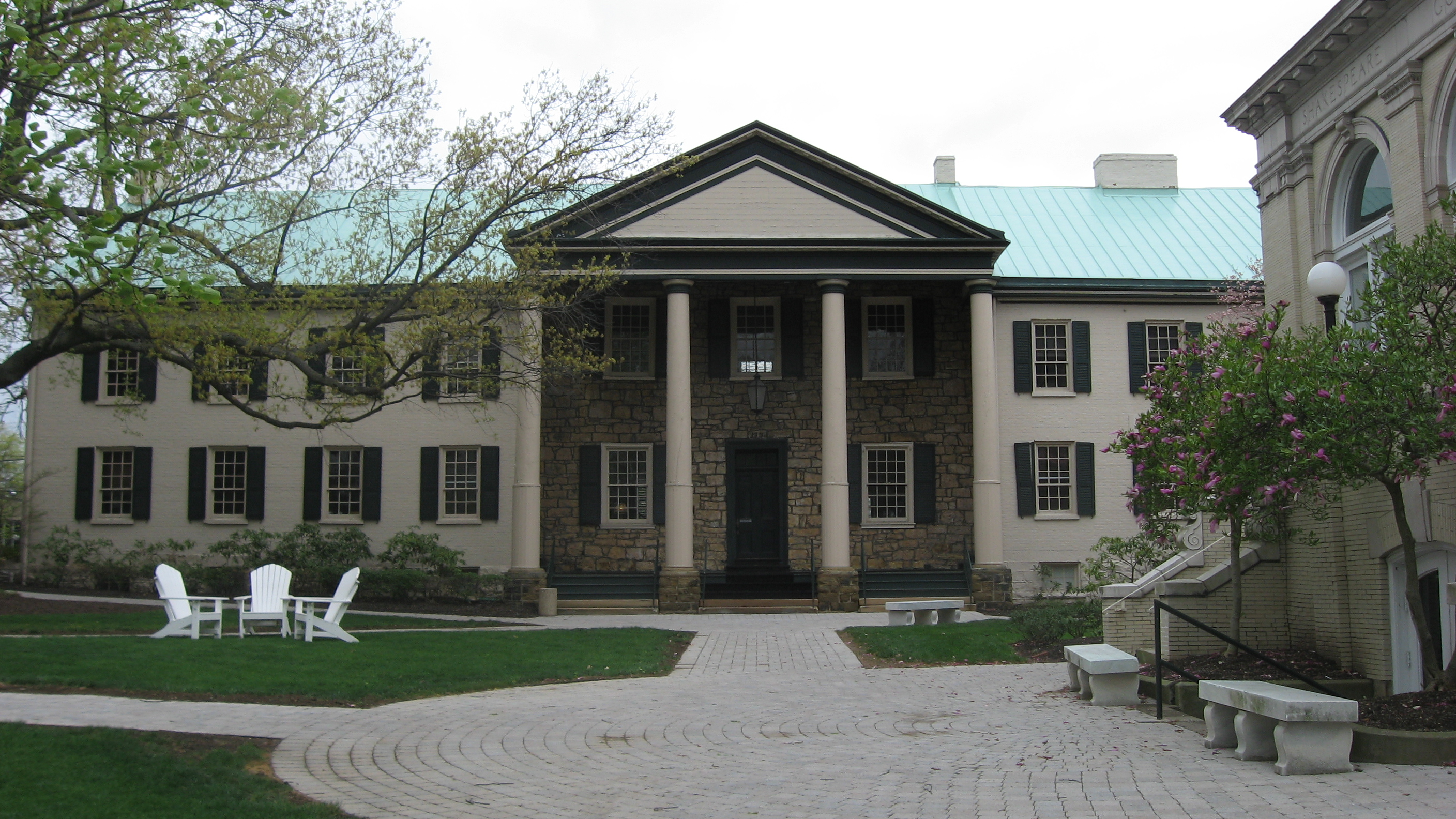
McMillan Hall, home to the administrative office of Washington & Jefferson College

The relationship between the City of Washington, Pennsylvania, and Washington & Jefferson College spans over two centuries, dating to the founding of both the city and the college in the 1780s. The relationship between the town and college were strong enough that the citizens of Washington offered the college a $50,000 donation in 1869 (equivalent to $1,209,000 in 2025) in a successful attempt to lure the Washington & Jefferson College trustees to select Washington over nearby Canonsburg as the consolidated location of the college. The relationship was strained through the latter half of the 20th century, however, as the college pursued an expansion policy that clashed with the residential neighborhood. The college's frustrations grew after preservationists unsuccessfully attempted to pass laws prohibiting the college from demolishing certain buildings that were listed on the East Washington Historic District. Relations were so bad that residents and college officials engaged in a shouting match at a meeting. Local preservationists also unsuccessfully tried to block the demolition of Hays Hall, which had been condemned.

In the 1990s, the City of Washington made several unsuccessful attempts to challenge the college's tax-exempt status. In 1993, Washington appealed the Washington County Board of Assessment's determination that the college was tax-exempt. That case went to the Pennsylvania Supreme Court, which ruled in favor of the college. In response, the Pennsylvania General Assembly passed a new law clarifying that colleges were tax-exempt. Separately, the City of Washington passed an ordinance that levied a municipal "service fee" against the College students, which was ruled to be illegal and was struck down. In the late 1990s, the college and town tried to mend fences through the Blueprint for Collaboration, a plan with detailed goals and benchmarks for the future to help the College and the city work together on economic development, environmental protection, and historic preservation.

== Early relations ==
The history of both the City of Washington and Washington & Jefferson College date to the 1780s, when Western Pennsylvania was part of the American frontier. In the early years, a number of prominent residents worked to secure the future of the college, including the leader of the Whiskey Rebellion, David Bradford, who served as an early trustee and helped build McMillan Hall, and Matthew Brown, who was the first Principal of Washington Academy and First Presbyterian Church of Washington. The first portion of the modern campus was donated to the college by William Hoge, who was the son of David Hoge, the founder of Washington. In 1869, citizens of Washington offered a $50,000 donation to the college in a successful attempt to lure the trustees to select Washington over nearby Canonsburg as the consolidated location of the college.

== Conflicts over expansion into East Washington ==
The college's 1968 campus master plan called for the expansion of the campus eastward towards Wade Avenue in East Washington Borough, a plan that placed them in conflict with the residents of that area. For the next 30 years, the college maintained a policy of purchasing any homes in that area as they became available. In 1984, the Washington County History and Landmarks Foundation was able to get the East Washington Historic District, a collection of 120 Victorian homes in that area, added to the National Register of Historic Places. The college opposed the designation but did not object in time to prevent it. According to President Howard J. Burnett, the district "was structured to prevent expansion of the college." In the 1990s, the hard feelings between some residents and the College came to a head, with residents trying to have the Borough enact anti-demolition laws to block expansion and a meeting of the Washington County History and Landmarks Foundation deteriorated into a shouting match between residents and college officials. Burnett maintained that the expansion was beneficial to the community and that the opposition came from a small and non-representative group on Wade Avenue. He also questioned the historic value of many of the designated homes, pointing out that many of them were in very poor shape and others were vacant. As of 1995, the college owned about 30 properties listed in the historic district. In the end, efforts to block the demolition of these buildings, including several which were part of the historic district, were unsuccessful. Notably, one 140-year-old farm house at 137 South Wade Street, which the college had acquired in 1977 after being vacant for several years, was moved to a new location outside of town.

== Safety and construction conflicts ==
During the planning stages of the Rossin Campus Center in 1991, the college asked the City of Washington to close South Lincoln Street between East Maiden and East Chestnut Street and reroute the traffic through College Street, which would have been made into a two-way street. The college was concerned about the increasing frequency of accidents between pedestrians and automobiles on that street, pointing to a recent incident involving an injured maintenance worker and the fact that there had been 6 other similar accidents in the previous 15 years. The new campus center would only increase pedestrian traffic on that street. The proposal was defeated by the City Council 5-0.

== Legal challenges to the college's tax-exempt status ==
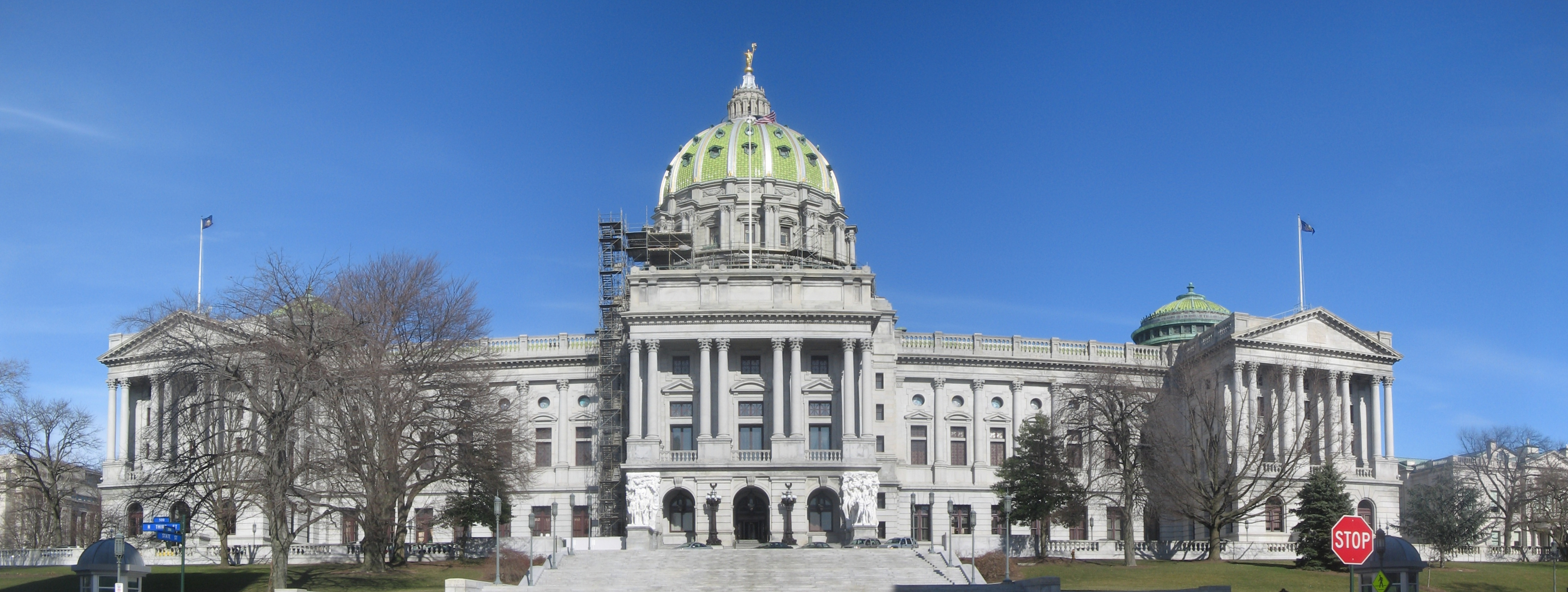
Litigation over Washington & Jefferson College's tax-exempt status spurred the Pennsylvania General Assembly to pass new legislation.

In 1993, the Washington County Board of Assessment ruled that the 87 properties owned by the college were exempt from property and real estate taxes. After an appeal to the Board of Assessment Appeals to reverse their earlier decision was denied, the city appealed the Washington County Court of Common Pleas. On August 5, 1994, Judge Thomas J. Terputac reversed the board's decision, ruling in Order No. 93-7033 that the college did not qualify for tax-exempt status. According to the trial court, Washington & Jefferson College was not a "purely public charity", failing four of five criteria in the Hospital Utilization Project case. Specifically, Judge Terputac opined that the college had been founded as a purely public charity, but had morphed into an "enterprise of big business." The college appealed to the Pennsylvania Commonwealth Court, which overturned Judge Terputac's decision on September 15, 1995, in a decision written by Judge James R. Kelley. According to that court, Washington & Jefferson College did satisfy the requirements to be considered a "purely public charity." Judges Bernard L. McGinley, Doris A. Smith-Ribner, and Dan Pellegrini dissented. The City of Washington appealed that decision to the Pennsylvania Supreme Court, which affirmed the lower court's decision on November 20, 1997, in a decision written by Justice John P. Flaherty. According to the court, the lower court was correct in concluding that the college did in fact satisfy the five requirements for an entity to be considered a "purely public charity," a standard that was set out in the Hospital Utilization Project case: "1) advance a charitable purpose; 2) donate or render gratuitously a substantial portion of its services; 3) benefit a substantial and indefinite class of persons who are legitimate subjects of charity; 4) relieve the government of some of its burden; and 5) operate entirely free from private profit motive." The court said that "the record demonstrates that W&J fulfills all of these requirements." Most persuasive was that the college's benefits were open to all and that those served were members of a charitable class. The dissent by Justice Russell M. Nigro did not state that he thought that the college should not be tax-exempt, only that the rest of the court had "so broadly construed its requirements that any private college or university can satisfy the test and obtain tax-exempt status."

=== Legislative response ===
In response to these legal challenges over Washington & Jefferson College's tax-exempt status, the Pennsylvania General Assembly unanimously passed House Bill 55 of 1997, the Institutions of Purely Public Charity Act. The legislation was passed days before the court's decision, when it was yet unclear how the court would rule in that case. Both the court decision and the legislation preserved the tax-exemption for colleges, maintaining the status quo. The bill provided uniform standards for determining the tax-exempt eligibility for all nonprofits, especially private colleges. The bill clarified the law and has had a long-term impact on other nonprofits besides private colleges, including hospitals, nursing homes, and public universities. Brian C. Mitchell, President of the Council of Independent Colleges and Universities of Pennsylvania (CICU), was instrumental in getting the bill enacted. In 1998, he was named President of Washington & Jefferson College. His experiences at president of the CICU were cited in his election announcement.

In 2009, when Pittsburgh Mayor Luke Ravenstahl proposed a 1% tax on college tuition for students at Pittsburgh colleges, this case was used to argue against the constitutionality of that proposal.

== Attempts to levy a "service fee" on college students ==
In 1995, the City of Washington passed Ordinance 1460, which established a "service fee" for municipal services that was targeted at Washington & Jefferson College students. The college appealed this ordinance to the Courts of Common Pleas of Washington County, arguing that "the ordinance is an illegal tax ordinance, not authorized by statute." In an opinion written by Judge David L. Gilmore, the court ruled that the "service fee" was actually a "tax masquerading as a fee" and that the label was "given to it merely to avoid the problem presented by enacting such a tax." The court noted that there was no legal basis for calling this ordinance a tax rather than a service fee, since the city admitted that it was facing budgetary shortfalls and had passed the ordinance in search of new revenue. According to the judge, the "ordinance attempts to raise additional revenue thereby creating a tax," which was not authorized by any statute. This case has been cited by legal counsel for local governments, cautioning against enacting similar provisions.

== Towards improved relations ==
After Brian C. Mitchell was installed as W&J President in 1998, he was surprised at the poor state of the college's relations with the city of Washington. During a courtesy visit to local officials early in his tenure, Mitchell was berated by the officials for 45 minutes, blaming the college "for everything that had gone wrong in the last 50 years.” With input from several other colleges and the Knight Collaborative, a national initiative designed to develop strategies for partnership between colleges and local community revitalization efforts, the college and the city developed the Blueprint for Collaboration, a plan with detailed goals and benchmarks for the future to help the College and the city work together on economic development, environmental protection, and historic preservation. The plan included provisions for the college to offer more academic opportunities for the community and to explore moving its bookstore into the downtown area, develop student housing in the downtown area, and to expand student use of the downtown eating, shopping, and visiting destinations. The City of Washington began a downtown revitalization project featuring new sidewalks, landscaping, and fiber-optic cables. The plan also called for an "investors roundtable," comprising federal and state officials, the banking community, commercial interests, and potential investors.

=== Conflict over Strawberry Alley ===
In April 2008, the location of the Swanson Science Center had to be shifted several feet towards Maiden Street after three members of the Washington City Council voted to reject an offer from the College to purchase Strawberry Alley, which runs through the campus. The College had offered $102,500 for the alleyway, which had an appraised value of $2,500. Following the vote, the Mayor of Washington indicated that one of the three nay votes had reneged on an agreement between the college and the council to accept the offer. Instead of accepting the offer, the City Council wanted to levy a $100 annual municipal services fee on each student, a proposal that was nearly identical to the service fee that was ruled illegal in 1995. The fee proposal never came to a vote, and in March 2010, the City Council voted unanimously to vacate Strawberry Alley, allowing the College to assume ownership of it for free.

=== Student running for Washington City Council ===
In February 2019, W&J student Trent Somes, III announced his intentions to run for Democratic nomination for Washington City Council, the first time a current student of W&J had done so. Somes ran on a libertarian platform of, "demolishing abandoned structures that contribute to the opioid crisis, decriminalizing possession of small amounts of marijuana within city limits, cutting any wasteful expenditures, and investigating outdated or unnecessary ordinances." Somes was endorsed by the Pennsylvania Young Democrats and the Libertarian Party of Washington County via social media. During the race, Somes' residency was challenged by the writer of an anonymous letter to the Observer–Reporter, but was refuted by Washington County election officials and Somes in statements to the paper. Somes lost the primary election to Joseph Pintola and Ken Wescott, garnering 340 votes (24.3%).

== See also ==
- Town and gown
