= Town and gown =

Two distinct communities of a university town

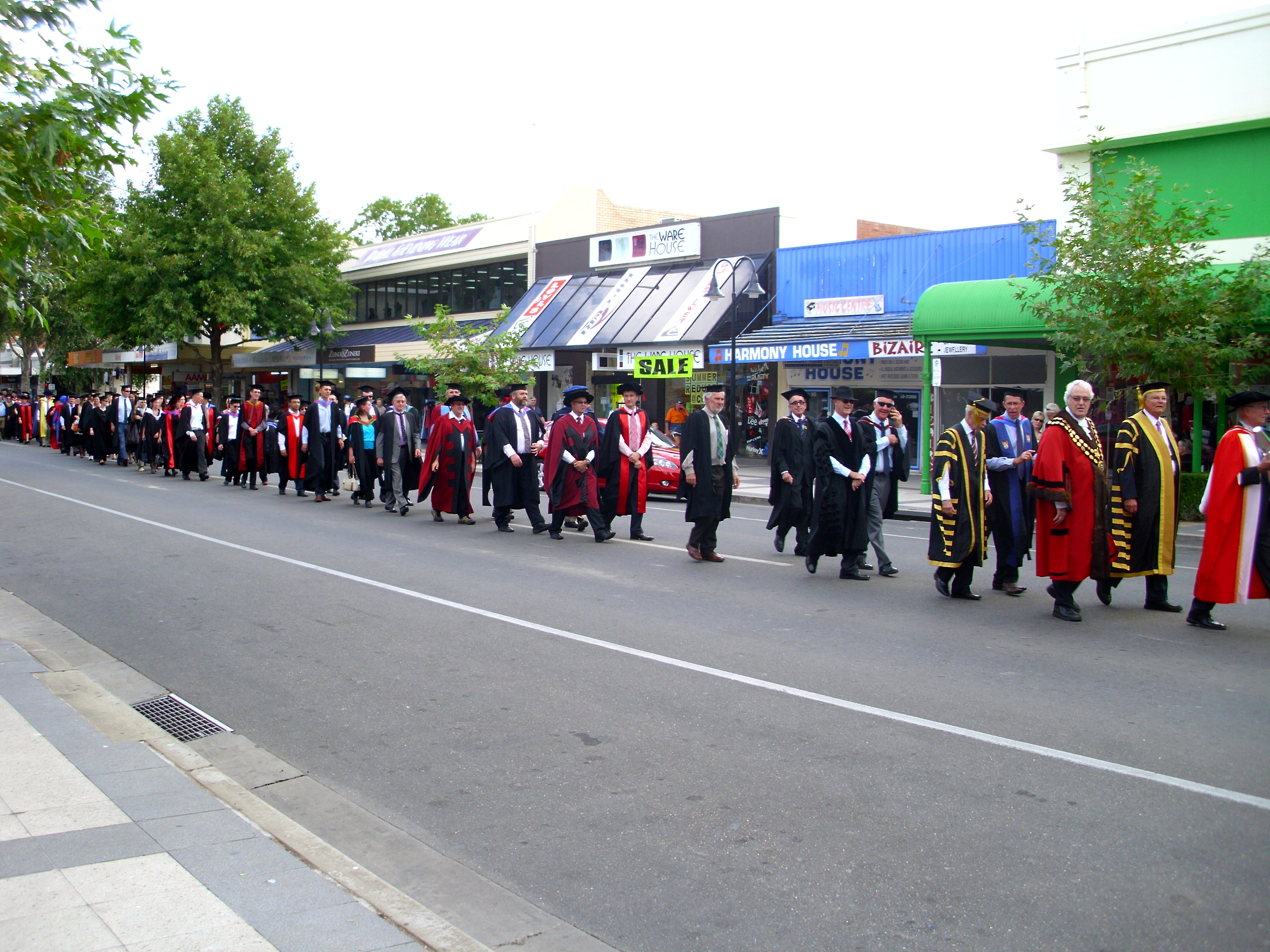
Charles Sturt University town and gown academic procession in Wagga Wagga, Australia

Town and gown are two distinct communities of a university town; 'town' being the non-academic population and 'gown' metonymically being the university community, especially in ancient seats of learning such as Oxford, Cambridge, Durham, and St Andrews, although the term is also used to describe modern university towns as well as towns with a significant public school. The metaphor is historical in its connotation but continues to be used in the literature on urban higher education and in common parlance.

== Origin of the term ==
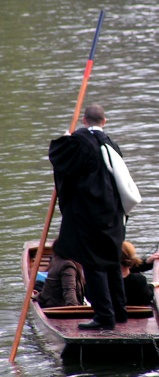
The gown and hood worn for bachelor's graduation at Cambridge

During the Middle Ages, students admitted to European universities often held minor clerical status and donned garb similar to that worn by the clergy. These vestments evolved into the academic long black gown, worn along with hood and cap. The gown proved comfortable for studying in unheated and draughty buildings and thus became a tradition in the universities. The gown also served as a social symbol, as it was impractical for physical manual work. The hood was often adorned with the colours of the colleges and designated the young scholar's university affiliation. Thus by their distinctive clothing, the students were set apart and distinguished from the citizens of the town; hence the phrase "town and gown".

== Middle Ages ==
=== The university as sanctuary ===
The idea of a school of higher learning as a distinct and autonomous institution within an urban setting dates back to the Academy founded by Plato c. 387 BC. The Academy was established as a sacred sanctuary for learning outside the city walls of Athens. Successors of the Academy existed over nine centuries until the final iteration was closed, along with other pagan schools, by Emperor Justinian in AD 529.

In the 12th century, when the early medieval universities came into existence – first in Italy and then across Europe – they were founded without physical campuses. The masters simply rented lecture halls in the host cities. Early on, there were few identifiable campus buildings (other than the residential colleges that were established at some universities). Most students took lodging in the university towns. The scholars often congregated in identifiable areas of cities, most famously the Left Bank (Rive gauche) of the Seine in Paris – what became known as the Quartier Latin ("The Latin Quarter", due to the use of spoken Latin). Thus, the medieval institutions were more integrated into the cities than in the case of the Academy. It is no accident that most medieval universities were founded within cities. The schools' existence required a permanent population and an infrastructure that included a vibrant marketplace and system of governance, but their dependence on the host towns was limited. In most instances, the endowment of the medieval universities was drawn largely, if not entirely, from the revenues of the Catholic Church. Consequently, the universities were largely independent of municipal revenues and, to a great extent, of civil authority. The medieval studium remained a sanctuary in its status as beneficiary of the Catholic Church and in the scholars' exemption from civil law. Such special jurisdictions were by no means uncommon in the Middle Ages. The applicable law varied greatly by person, organisation and area: the towns themselves had legal systems totally different from the surrounding countryside, and even inside the town, every guild usually had its own special privileges and rights. The independent jurisdiction of the universities essentially was part of this system.

=== Anatomy of an adversarial relationship ===
The initial relationship between the medieval universities and the host town was adversarial for various reasons, and over time, the universities' growing autonomy and independence from local control led to increasing tensions with host towns. Also, the steady encroachment of universities upon neighbouring areas created a point of contention between town and gown (continuing to the present).

The medieval universities formed as guilds of masters (teachers) or scholastic guilds of students on the model established by the crafts guilds. Once the scholars were able to receive a charter, they would begin negotiations with municipal authorities to secure fair rents for lecture halls and other concessions. Because they had no investment in a physical campus, they could threaten to migrate to another town if their demands were not met. This was not an empty threat. The scholars at the University of Lisbon in Portugal migrated to Coimbra, and then later back to Lisbon in the 14th century. Scholars would also go on strike, leave the host city, and not return for years. This happened at the University of Paris after a riot in 1229 (started by the students). The university did not return to Paris for two years.

Many university students were foreigners with exotic manners and dress who spoke and wrote Latin, the lingua franca of medieval higher education in Western Europe. Students often could not speak the local dialect, and most uneducated townspeople spoke no Latin. The language barrier and the cultural differences did nothing to improve relations between scholars and townspeople. The tenor of town–gown relations became a matter of arrogance on the one hand and resentment on the other.

Students in the medieval universities enjoyed certain exemptions from the jurisdiction of the ordinary civil courts. These privileges were normally safeguarded by a conservator Apostolic, usually a bishop or archbishop appointed by the pope. By the Papal bull Parens scientiarum ("Father of the Sciences") (1231), the charter of the University of Paris, Pope Gregory IX authorised the masters, in the event of an outrage committed by anyone upon a scholar and not redressed within fifteen days, to suspend their lectures. This right of cessation of lectures was frequently made use of in conflicts between town and gown. On various occasions, the popes themselves intervened to protect the scholars against encroachments by the local civil authorities. Pope Nicholas IV in 1288 threatened to disrupt the studium at Padua unless the municipal authorities repealed within fifteen days ordinances they had framed against scholars. It became quite common for the university to lay its grievances against the city fathers before the Holy See, and its appeal was usually successful. (See The Catholic Encyclopedia for a more in-depth discussion.)

Thus, medieval students were under the legal protection of the clergy, who protected them from physical harm. They could be tried for crimes only in a church court under canon law. The protection from civil law gave students free rein in the urban environs to break secular laws with near impunity. This often led to abuses and outright criminal behaviour among students who realised they enjoyed immunity from civil authorities. The anomalous jurisdictional situation only exacerbated tensions between town and gown.

=== Town versus gown ===
Conflict was inevitable in the medieval university towns, where two separately governed bodies with different priorities and loyalties shared the same restricted space. Moreover, violence was commonplace in medieval life, not only between scholars and townsmen, but also among ordinary citizens, as well as between scholars from different regions of Europe who attended the universities.

Violent confrontations between town and gown erupted on a recurring basis. One of the most famous was the Battle of St. Scholastica Day, which occurred on 10 February 1355, at the University of Oxford. An argument in a tavern – a familiar scenario – escalated into a protracted two-day battle in which local citizens armed with bows attacked the academic village, killing and maiming scores of scholars. The rioters were severely punished, and thenceforth, the mayor and bailiffs had to attend a Mass for the souls of the dead every St. Scholastica's Day thereafter and to swear an annual oath to observe the university's privileges. For 500 years, Oxford observed a day of mourning for that tragedy.

The University of Cambridge was originally set up after a fight between the townspeople of Oxford and scholars from the University of Oxford forced many scholars to flee to a new location in 1209. Later, the tension between the scholars at Cambridge and the townspeople forced the king to grant special privileges and protection to Cambridge University, which helped enormously in the survival and future success of the university.

By the mid-15th century, kings were putting an end to student power within the universities. They ordered papal legates to reform the universities and restricted student boycotts and strikes. From then on, whether under king or revolutionary government, dictator or Parliament, European universities would customarily be ruled by the central authority – although the degree of control varied widely over time and place.

Following the upheavals of the High Middle Ages, relations between the European universities and the host towns evolved toward a pattern of mutual support. Cities, on some occasions, took over payment of salaries and provided loans, while regulating the book trade, lodgings, and the various other services students required. Eventually, cities began to take pride in their universities rather than look upon them as adversaries.

== Early modern ==
Over the centuries, the relationship between town and gown has remained ambivalent. There have been points where a university in crisis has been rescued by the urban dynamics surrounding it, while at other times, urban developments have threatened to undermine the stability of the university. Conversely, there have been occasions where the university provided a focus and coherence for the cultural life of the city; though at other times, it has withdrawn into itself and undermined urban culture.

Despite generally improved relations between town and gown in the post-medieval era, disputes and conflicts were a recurring phenomenon. The City Council of Oxford had numerous quarrels with the University of Oxford, one such incident saw both parties pressing their rights to license citizens in different trades in 1675. The dispute ended with the university keeping its right to grant privileges to craftsmen (a right it had enjoyed since the 14th century) while the city held the power to grant freemen the right to pursue trades that were without reference to the university.

=== Yale and New Haven ===
Another brief chronicle of incidents involving Yale College students and residents of New Haven, Connecticut, illustrates the continuing strain upon town–gown relations. The nature of these disputes ranged from theological to martial.

Founded in 1701, Yale moved to New Haven in 1716. In 1753, President Thomas Clap began holding separate Sunday worship services for students in the college instead of at First Church, because he felt that the minister, Joseph Noyes, was theologically suspect. (Yale was founded by Congregational ministers but currently has no religious affiliation.) This move alienated the Connecticut clergy and marked the beginning of the Yale undergraduates' ambivalent relationship with the town of New Haven.

Over the course of a century, New Haven witnessed a series of violent confrontations between students and "townies" that recall the confrontations in the medieval university towns. In 1806, a full-scale riot – the first of many – fought with fists, clubs, and knives, broke out between off-duty sailors and Yale students. In 1841, a clash with city firefighters took place. After Yale students attacked the firehouse and destroyed equipment, a town mob threatened to burn the college. Military companies had to be called in to keep the peace. Then in 1854, bricks and bullets flew after a confrontation between students and townspeople at a New Haven theatre. When the leader of the town group was stabbed, students retreated to the college. The locals actually brought in two militia cannons and aimed them at the college but were stopped by constables before they could fire them.

Things were relatively quiet until 1919, when returning local servicemen, angry over perceived insults from Yale students, attacked the Old Campus. Finding the gates locked, they broke hundreds of windows and moved on to theatres and restaurants in the town, assaulting any students they could find. In 1959, a student snowball fight on city streets got out of hand and resulted in arrests by New Haven police. Students then pelted police officers with snowballs during the St. Patrick's Day parade. The so-called "snowball riot" attracted national media attention – a preview of the tumultuous 1960s.

== Modern ==
A wave of student unrest took place in North America and Europe during the 1960s, from Paris to Mexico City to California. The Free Speech Movement, centred at the University of California, Berkeley, has often been cited as the starting point of the unrest. The US student movement was ostensibly about demands for more freedom and a share in decision making on campus, but it was stoked by two broader issues – civil rights for African Americans and protests against the Vietnam War. The most violent incidents occurred when National Guard troops fired upon and killed four students at Kent State University in Ohio and when police fired on dormitories at Jackson State University in Mississippi in the spring of 1970, killing two bystanders.

The town-and-gown divide is visible in numerous older universities globally. In the university town of Uppsala in Sweden, clergy, royalty and academia historically reside on the western shore of the river Fyris, somewhat separated from the rest of the city, and the ensemble of cathedral (consecrated 1435), castle and university (founded in 1477) has remained mostly undisturbed until today. Since the Middle Ages, commercial activity has been geographically centred on the eastern side of the river.

Many of the medieval traditions have carried into the modern era, and universities retain certain historical privileges. Two examples are illustrative: 1) Students in some universities were compelled to wear gowns up to the 1960s to make them identifiable to the university authorities. 2) Under the Russian tsars, police were forbidden to enter the universities, a tradition that was respected during the Russian repression of Prague in the summer of 1968.

=== Post-1960s: changing climate, changing issues ===
Cities and their universities evolved from the integrated residential patterns of the High Middle Ages to a more distinct partition. As colleges acquired physical facilities, visible campuses formed with a proximate student population. Residential colleges became a fixture in European universities, while American colleges (often located in small towns) sequestered students in dormitories under close supervision. The lines that defined the two communities were clearly drawn, but this distinction was becoming blurred by the 1970s.

The doctrine of in loco parentis had developed both as a legal concept and as a custom in the United States. The Latin phrase meaning "in place of a parent" held schools to a high standard of care for the welfare of students. However, this legal concept was eroded by the Bradshaw v Rawling and by subsequent court rulings. The pendulum would swing back toward the medieval model, where students could enjoy significant autonomy in their choice of residence and habits.

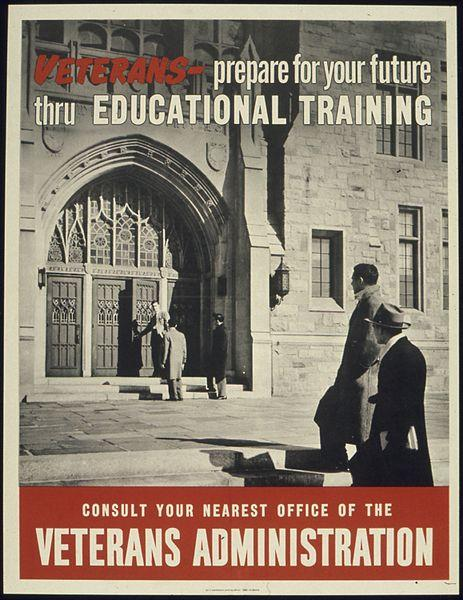
A government poster on the G.I. Bill, which provided veterans with financial aid to pursue college degrees

The trend of American students living off campus had emerged during the post-World War II era. The Servicemen's Readjustment Act legislation, popularly known as the "G.I. Bill", provided large numbers of returning veterans with the financial aid to pursue college degrees. Many veterans were older than traditional students or had families to support; this further spurred the growth of off-campus housing. It was estimated that by century's end, as many as 85% of American college students lived off campus (Carnegie Commission). This residential trend – and other factors – would mitigate the division between town and gown (but not necessarily the tensions). Universities increasingly integrated into cities as cities absorbed and accommodated universities. Commuter colleges, such as San Francisco State University, now enroll large numbers of students who live at a distance, commute to campus for classes, and then leave at the end of each school day. Concurrently, American universities have opened branch campuses and even offer classes in storefront venues.

However, the recent integration of campus and community has not been without problems. For one thing, an urban university can generate major traffic and exacerbate parking problems in adjacent neighbourhoods. The quality of neighbourhoods near a university may deteriorate. Certain industries requiring highly educated workers, such as biotechnology, may be drawn to college communities. The growth of these knowledge economies, and additional upwardly mobile residents, may increase the competition for community space or drive up land costs. The expansion of campuses has led to the razing of some neighbourhoods and the displacement of large numbers of city residents. These factors create continuing tensions between town and gown, but in some scenarios, the university and the local community work together in revitalisation projects.

Local residents and members of the university community may clash over other political, economic, and demographic issues. Some localities in the Northeastern United States have tried to block students from registering to vote in elections as local residents, instead demanding that they vote by absentee ballot at their parents' residence. Many universities in college towns are located on unincorporated land, which prevents students living in on-campus housing from voting in town elections.

As urban universities increase in size and complexity, they hire a large staff of city residents. Labor unions have formed on campuses and bargain collectively for contracts. In 1971, a 53-day strike among Yale employees was the longest in the school's history. Union leaders stated that they considered Yale's social commitment to New Haven to be a key issue in the job action. University workers in New Haven would strike again and again in the 1970s, 1980s, and 1990s.

Historically, over half of all college students in the U.S. have lived independently off campus. However, in communities where institutions have expanding enrollments and insufficient housing for their students, the competition between students and residents for off-campus student housing has become a common source of friction in town-gown relations.

Municipalities and universities continue to negotiate police jurisdiction on and near campuses. Today, many universities and colleges maintain their own police forces. In cities where a significant number of students live off campus, university police may be allowed to patrol these neighbourhoods to provide an extra measure of security. Meanwhile, civil libertarians argue that school officials should only call on local law enforcement to intervene when it is necessary to protect the safety of people on campus. Such intrusion is legally mandated in some jurisdictions when school officials have reasonable suspicion to believe that a student is breaking the law. Generally, local police are reluctant to go on campus if a college maintains its own security force (the Kent State and Jackson State killings are examples of intervention turning into tragedy).

Raucous off-campus parties and the excessive noise and public drunkenness associated with them can also create town–gown animosity. The University of Colorado (Boulder, Colorado, USA) and Queen's University (Kingston, Canada) provide examples where street parties have escalated into riots. In 1995, at Wilfrid Laurier University in sedate Waterloo, Ontario, the "Ezra Street riot" occurred when 1500 revellers showed up at an end-of-the-year student party on Ezra Street. The party goers drank copious amounts of beer, threw bottles, and carried on in ways that resulted in 42 arrests and two serious injuries – one when a woman was hit by a chunk of concrete thrown at the party, the other when a man was run over by a jeep. The end result was the university's adoption of a new "Code of Conduct" to govern student behaviour. Persistent low-level disturbances can also raise tensions with local communities. For example, for as long as the University of York has existed, the local population of Heslington has protested against attempts to lengthen pub open hours due to the disruption when pubs close.

In the 1970s and 1980s, attention was often focused on off-campus fraternities and sororities, whose sometimes rowdy events were lampooned in the 1978 film Animal House. Ironically, the institution of "social responsibility" measures to restrict events at fraternity houses has exacerbated tensions, as events moved to non-Greek block and house parties farther off campus. The push of social events off campus also increases the incidents of drunk driving, as students who wish to party are pushed outside of campus.

In the US, a rash of disputes between public universities and host cities have developed in regard to the cost and benefits of the town–gown connection. Universities boast that their existence is the backbone of the town economy, while the towns counter with claims that the institution is "robbing" them of tax revenue; but as universities expand their campuses, more land property is removed from local tax rolls. Attempts are being pursued to redefine the basic financial terms and conditions upon which the relationship is based. As tax-exempt institutions, universities have had no legal obligation to contribute to the coffers of city government, but some do make payments in lieu of taxes based on negotiated agreements (as is the case in Boston).

Despite the rise in legal battles, universities and host towns have an incentive to co-operate, as the schools require city services and need city approval for long-range plans while the university towns need remuneration for public services provided. The "engaged university" is a recent term describing community partnerships and joint planning with city officials. Additionally, in some college towns, local culture is constructed by students and non-students alike, such as Athens, Georgia, which was ranked as the No. 1 college music town by Rolling Stone. In Athens, local culture that students identify with and take part in is often supported or created by non-students, in this case, musicians. While some degree of misunderstanding or rivalry might persist between "students" and "townies", coexistence and co-operation take place as well.

Town-gown parameters may become increasingly difficult to define in the near future. Geography is less salient as a factor in urban higher education in the Information Age. Some private institutions, such as the University of Phoenix, rely less on geographical presence, enrolling students in a broad range of online degree programs. Other courses may comprise part-time or night classes for working professionals or intensive training taking place over a group of weekends or months. Many of these non-traditional students live and work full-time in the surrounding community. Traditional brick-and-mortar universities have countered with their own distance education courses via television and the Internet. Traditional universities also recruit locally for special programs, such as executive MBA degrees.

The 12th century witnessed the birth of the first predecessors of the modern university; many educational futurists argue that the division between town and gown is rapidly fading and that the 21st century is the cusp of another revolutionary educational paradigm. According to these forecasts, the 21st-century college student may well be someone sitting at his or her personal computer miles from a college campus. Graduation may or may not include the traditional commencement ceremony. These reformers argue that for graduating students, the gown may be left hanging in the closet, with the graduate interacting more seamlessly within the global community. However, such views are currently dismissed to a greater or lesser extent by leading universities, who admit the importance of technology and the diminution in town/gown rivalries but stress the continuing value of traditional learning and teaching methods.

=== Post-2000s: university agglomeration and knowledge spillovers ===
Post-2000s, the face of town and gown relations has changed as the effects of agglomeration have increasingly been studied and understood in urban economics. University agglomeration, or clustering, occurs when a large number of institutions of higher education all locate in the same geographical area. This shift has been an important one for town and gown relations, as increasingly relationships between universities and their surrounding communities is no longer bilateral but multilateral; no longer town and gown but town and gowns. Prominent examples of such agglomeration in the United States include the large numbers of colleges and universities located in the San Francisco Bay Area, contributing to the development of Silicon Valley, as well as the well-known Research Triangle located in North Carolina.

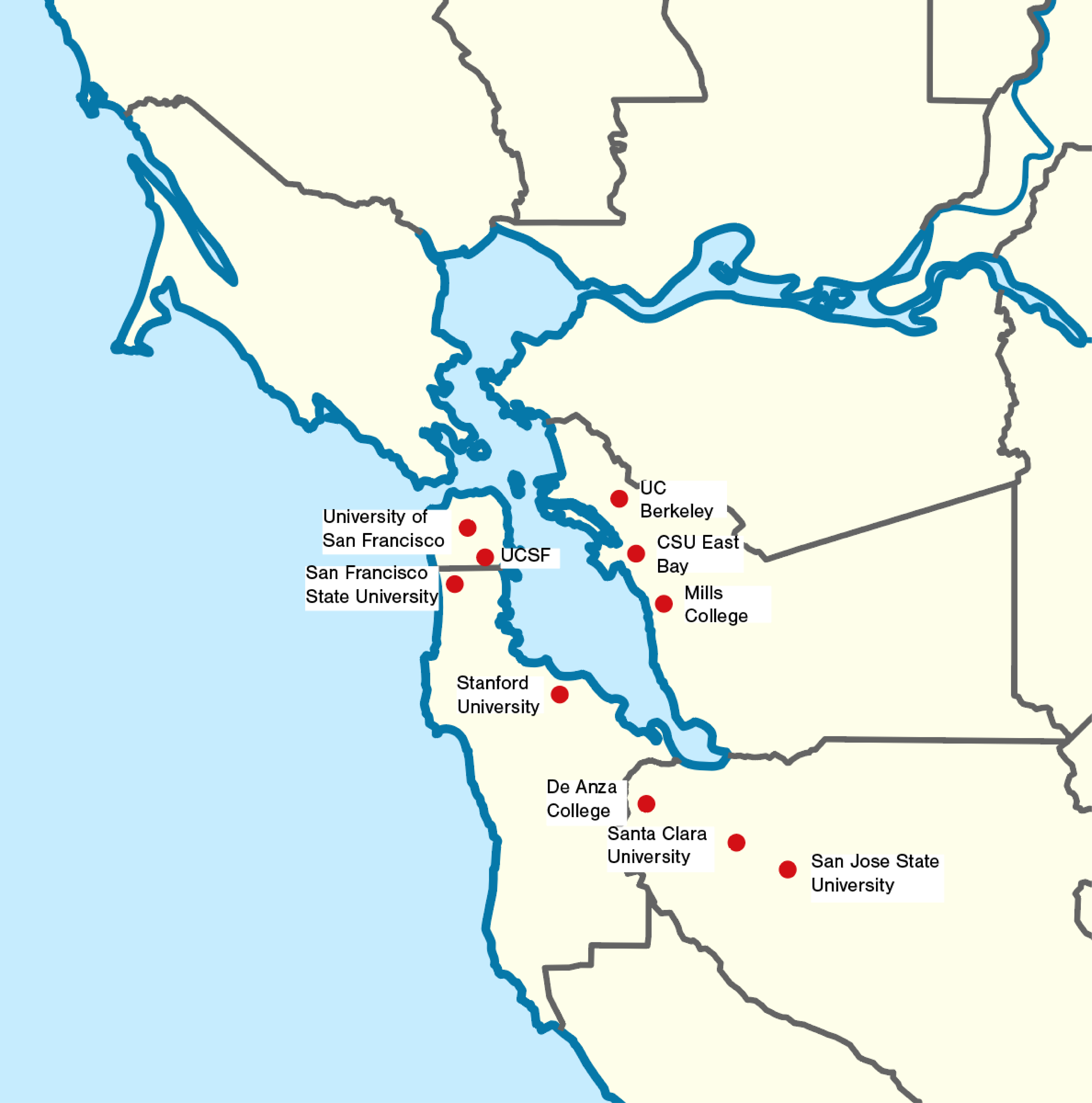
Colleges and universities in the Bay Area with approximate locations.

These agglomerations in metropolitan areas leads to what experts call knowledge spillovers, which is simply defined as the exchange of ideas among individuals. The physical proximity of entities allows for the rapid exchange of knowledge, ideas, expertise, and people. A common example of knowledge spillovers is a business park, where many businesses that often have no relation locate in the same complex and benefit simply from each other's presence. This is extremely similar to university agglomerations – colleges and universities that have no special relationship often benefit simply from having other institutions of higher education near them for easy exchange of ideas, resources, and opportunities between faculty and students. An extreme example of this is the Claremont Colleges, located in Claremont, California. At the Claremont Colleges, five undergraduate liberal arts colleges and two graduate institutions are all located right across the street from one another, thus enabling students from each college to interact with students from the other colleges socially and in clubs. Further, as the Claremont Colleges do cooperate with one another, students are able to cross-register in classes at the other colleges, eat in the other college's dining halls, and further benefit from enhanced shared resources like the Honnold-Mudd Library, Student Health Services, and Campus Safety.

However, colleges and universities located near one another bears fruit not only for the colleges and universities themselves but also for the areas they are located in. Experts at the University of California, Merced and National Bureau of Economic Research have been able to quantify spillover effects from universities on their communities, finding that "a 10% increase in higher education spending increases local non-education sector labor income by about 0.8%". Further, researchers at UC Berkeley also found that an increase in university researchers in a local labor market is correlated with an increase in the amount of patents granted in that area. In this way, many areas benefit from a large number of institutions of higher education within their borders. These benefits, however, often came come with their costs as a high number of students, faculty, and resources needed to support universities can put a strain on local governments. In the aforementioned city of Claremont, California, local officials have tried to raise sales taxes to level the tax burden in order to fund essential city services, as many college students do not pay taxes to the city but do shop in it.

Tensions in the 21st century have been raised by the expansion of universities, leading to "studentification" of cities as locals are displaced by students and single family homes are converted into houses in multiple occupation. This can lead to rising property prices, making housing unaffordable for locals, closure of schools and other services, and increases in disruptive behaviour. Examples across the UK include St Andrews, Durham and Fallowfield, Manchester. This has led to initiatives that attempt to integrate students better into the local communities, such as a scheme in Sheffield that has students volunteering in local care homes and accommodation at the University of Bristol that is shared between students and young locals, including care leavers, key workers and people who have experienced homelessness.

== See also ==
- 2005 Quebec student strike
- Away with the learning of clerks, away with it!
- City of Washington – Washington & Jefferson College relations
- College town
- Columbia University protests of 1968
- Free Speech Movement
- German student movement
- Jackson State killings
- Kent State shootings
- May 1968 events in France
- Murder of Christian Prince
- Murder of Yngve Raustein
- Orangeburg massacre
- Reality checkpoint
- St Scholastica Day riot
- San Luis Obispo Mardi Gras controversy
- Student activism
- University of Paris strike of 1229
- Youth activism

== Bibliography ==
- Kemp, Roger L. (2013). Town & Gown Relations: A Handbook of Best Practices. Jefferson, North Carolina, USA, and London, England: McFarland and Company, Inc. ISBN 978-0-7864-6399-2.
- Manahan, Richard A. (15 September 1980). "Town and Gown: The Relationship between City and Campus". Vital Speeches of the Day. 46 (23).
- Seybolt, Robert F. (1921). The Manuale Scholarium: An Original Account of Life in the Medieval University. Harvard University Press.
- Seybolt, Robert F. (1927). Renaissance Student Life: The Paedologia of Petrus Mosellanus. University of Illinois Press.
- Seybolt, Robert F. The Autobiography of Johannes Butzbach: A Wandering Scholar of the Fifteenth Century. Ann Arbor, MI.
