= Brian C. Mitchell =

American academic administrator

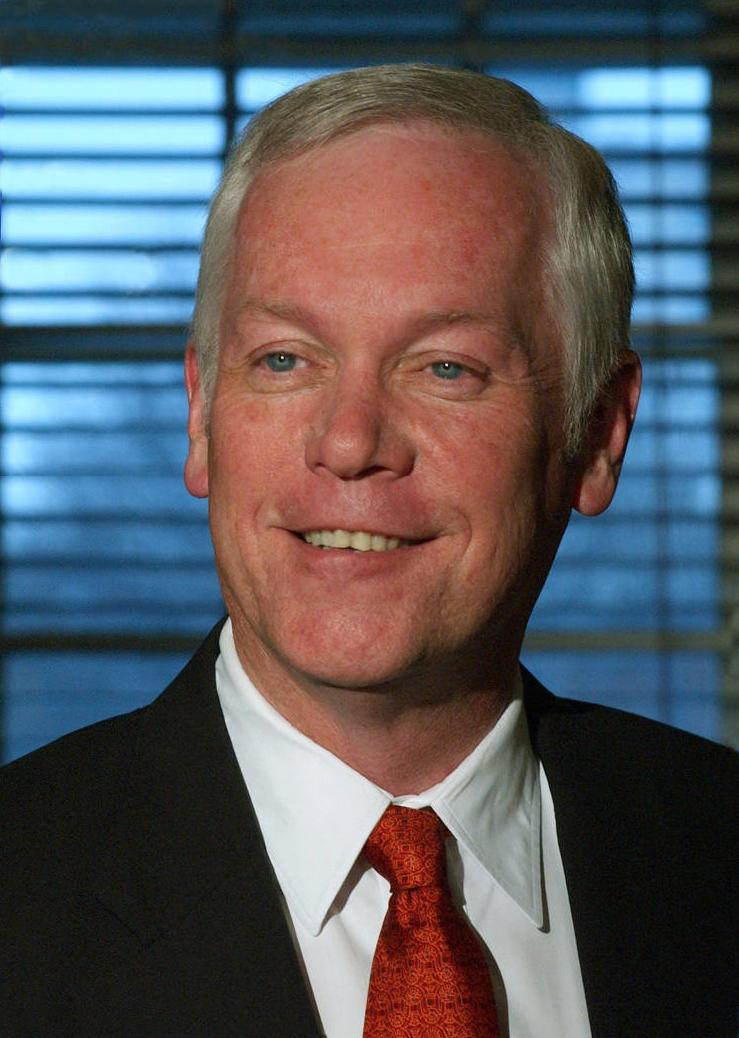

16th President of Bucknell University
- In office July 1, 2004 – July 1, 2010
- Preceded by: Steffen H. Rogers
- Succeeded by: John C. Bravman

11th President of Washington & Jefferson College
- In office June 2, 1998 – July 1, 2004
- Preceded by: Howard J. Burnett
- Succeeded by: G. Andrew Rembert (acting); Tori Haring-Smith

Personal details
- Born: 1953 (age 72–73) Lowell, Massachusetts
- Spouse: Maryjane Murphy Mitchell
- Children: Jeffrey and Patrick
- Education: University of Rochester Merrimack College
- Profession: Professor

Brian Christopher Mitchell (born 1953) is the president and managing principal of Academic Innovators. Prior to founding Academic Innovators, he served as president of Brian Mitchell & Associates, LLC. He was previously the president of Bucknell University, serving from 2004 until 2010. From 1998 through 2004, he served as president of Washington & Jefferson College. He is a nationally recognized expert in higher education, especially on private higher education.

Mitchell has served as chairman of the Pennsylvania Selection Committee for the Rhodes Scholarships and is a past president of the National Association of Independent College and University State Executives. He is a member of the Pennsylvania Historical and Museum Commission and is a former member of the boards of National Association of Independent Colleges and Universities, the Pennsylvania Humanities Council, and National History Day.

== Early life and education ==
A native of Lowell, Massachusetts, Mitchell graduated from Keith Academy and from Merrimack College in 1974. He received his PhD from the University of Rochester, and is an expert in 19th-century urban, ethnic, and labor history. He wrote The Paddy Camps: The Irish of Lowell, 1821–1861, a critically acclaimed book examining those fields. As a professor, he chaired the history department at Anna Maria College and taught at George Mason University, the University of Massachusetts Lowell, Bentley College, Lesley College, New Hampshire College (now Southern New Hampshire University), and the University of Rochester. He was awarded the Haskell Award for Distinguished Teaching in the Humanities from Lowell and the Albert J. Beveridge Grant for Research in American History from the American Historical Association.

== Career ==
Mitchell worked as a program officer in the Division of State Programs of the National Endowment for the Humanities and became president of the Council of Independent Colleges and Universities of Pennsylvania (CICU) in 1991. In that position, Mitchell was instrumental in getting House Bill 55 of 1997, the Institutions of Purely Public Charity Act, unanimously passed in the Pennsylvania state House and the state Senate. The bill provided uniform standards for determining the tax-exempt eligibility for all nonprofits, especially private colleges. This legislation was passed in response to Washington, Pennsylvania's 1993 lawsuit against Washington & Jefferson College challenging the college’s tax-exempt status. The bill clarified the law and has had a long-term impact on other nonprofits besides private colleges, including hospitals, nursing homes, and public universities.

=== Washington & Jefferson College ===
Upon assuming the presidency of Washington and Jefferson College in 1998, Mitchell was thrust into a long-simmering schism between the city of Washington, Pennsylvania and the college. During a courtesy visit to local officials early in his tenure, Mitchell was berated by the officials for 45 minutes, blaming the college "for everything that had gone wrong in the last 50 years.”

In 2000, the college and Franklin & Marshall College, Michigan State University and SUNY Geneseo participated in a collaborative effort sponsored by the Knight Collaborative, a national initiative designed to develop strategies for partnership between colleges and local community revitalization efforts. Shortly thereafter, Washington & Jefferson was awarded a $50,000 grant from the Claude Worthington Benedum Foundation to develop a coherent plan, entitled the "Blueprint for Collaboration," to detail goals and benchmarks for the future to help the college and the city work together on economic development, environmental protection, and historic preservation. The plan included provisions for the college to offer more academic opportunities for the community and to explore moving its bookstore into the downtown area, develop student housing in the downtown area, and to expand student use of the downtown eating, shopping, and visiting destinations. The City of Washington began a downtown revitalization project featuring new sidewalks, landscaping, and fiber-optic cables. The plan also called for an "investors roundtable," comprising federal and state officials, the banking community, commercial interests, and potential investors.

Mitchell ushered in an expansion of the academic programs, including the addition of an Environmental Studies Program, an Information Technology Leadership Program, the Office of Life-Long Learning, the Center for Excellence in Teaching and Learning, and a Bachelor of Arts Degree Program in Music. The college's international partnership and student exchange with the University of Cologne was expanded. A capital campaign brought in over $90 million and the college simultaneously increased the volume of applications and became more selective in its admission practices.

In June 2001, Mitchell and the Washington and Jefferson trustees adopted a new master plan to remodel the campus and its educational environment, building modifications and a campus beautification program. The campus dining facility, the "Commons," was remodeled in 2000, the football field was improved and rededicated as Cameron Stadium in 2001, and the Old Gym was re-purposed as a campus fitness and wellness center. Several new buildings were constructed under the plan, including The Burnett Center in 2001, a new technology center in 2003, and a new dormitory in 2002. A second dormitory was initiated in 2003 and was completed after Mitchell's March 2004 departure for the presidency of Bucknell University.

=== Bucknell University ===
Brian C. Mitchell was named Bucknell University’s 16th president in July 2004 and served six years until stepping down in June, 2010. During his tenure, Bucknell expanded programs in biomedical engineering, environmental studies, and public policy. Mitchell is the principal architect behind the development of Bucknell University’s strategic plan and its first comprehensive master plan since the 1930s. He led a major fundraising effort for Bucknell to raise at least $400 million over the next several years and which has already raised over $170 million from all sources to date. He assisted with the development of new 30,000 sq. ft. Barnes & Noble Bookstore in downtown Lewisburg as well as rehabilitated downtown administrative office space, the rejuvenation of the art deco Campus Theater, a business incubation center, Bucknell Landing which opens the Susquehanna River directly to Bucknell's faculty, students, staff and programs, and more than 10 miles in rails-to-trails projects in the region.

Working with Bucknell's faculty, he implemented a new arts and science curriculum; ABET reaccreditation of the university's engineering college, the move from department to a School of Management, and the migration to the 5-course load that lowered the student/faculty ratio to 10/1. More than 60 new professors were hired during his tenure, amid a focus on improving faculty salaries, expanding sabbatical and travel funds, opening a new Teaching and Learning Center. During his service, Bucknell improved its bond rating.

=== Edvance Foundation ===
In July 2010, Mitchell partnered with Kurt M. Thiede to establish the Edvance Foundation, a nonprofit organization bringing expertise, resources, ingenuity, and foresight to institutions of higher education across the U.S.

=== Later career ===
Mitchell serves as the chair of the Board of Trustees of Merrimack College. He is also a member of the board of the National Merit Scholarship Corporation in Chicago and has served as a trustee of Washington and Jefferson College. He co-authored two books on higher education leadership and governance, How to Run a College: A Practical Guide for Trustees, Faculty, Administrators, and Policymakers and Leadership Matters: Confronting the Hard Choices Facing Higher Education (Johns Hopkins University Press, 2018, 2022, ISBN 9781421424774 and ISBN 9781421442440).

Mitchell was honored with the 2010 national award for individual contributions to American higher education by the Posse Foundation in New York City in May 2010.
