= University charter =

Document to create or recognize a university

A university charter is a charter issued by an authority to create, authorize or recognize a university. These may be charters issued by a papal bull or by a sovereign or government under prerogative powers or legislative acts. University charters have been issued in Europe since the 13th century and came to be seen as necessary for the establishment of a university from the 14th century.

== History ==
The earliest universities, such as Bologna, Paris and Oxford arose organically from concentrations of schools in those cities, rather than being created by charters. Other early universities, such as Cambridge, were founded by migrations from existing universities. Both Oxford and Cambridge received various privileges by royal charters in the 13th and 14th centuries but did not derive their status as universities from these charters.

The first university charters were issued in Europe in the 13th century, with the University of Naples created by a charter of Emperor Frederick II in 1224, widely considered the first deliberately-created university (studium generale). King Alfonso VIII of Castille issued a charter in 1208 to create the University of Palencia but the status of that institution is doubtful. The first papal creation was the University of Toulouse in 1229, via a papal bull of Pope Gregory IX. Through the 13th century, most university foundations continued to develop organically, often by migrations of scholars from other universities, but by the start of the 14th century either a papal bull or an imperial charter was considered necessary. From the mid-13th century, foundation charters were explicit that they were founding a studium generale. The jus ubique docendi – the right to grant degrees that were universally recognised – was normally also explicit in these charters, but was considered implicit even when not stated.

Papal letters and bulls to create universities fell into four categories: Firstly, the creation of a new university where no school had existed before (e.g. Prague in 1347–48); secondly, the refoundation of a university that had vanished or substantially declined (e.g. Perpignan in 1379); thirdly, the apparent creation of a new university where one already existed (e.g. Montpellier in 1289); and finally, the confirmation of an existing university (e.g. Salamanca in 1255). Bologna and Paris received bulls confirming their status in 1291 and 1292 respectively,. and Cambridge received a papal bull in 1318 that either confirmed its status as a studium generale or conferred this status upon it. Oxford, however, never received a bull confirming its status as a studium generale, but this remained unquestioned.

Sir Alexander Grant describes the papal bulls that founded the three pre-Reformation ancient universities of Scotland (St Andrews, Glasgow and Aberdeen) in the 15th century as consisting of a preamble stating why a university was being founded, a clause stating "instituimus et fundamus Studium Generale" (we institute and found the university), concessions of privileges, and mention of degrees and the officers of the university.

Following the Reformation, this changed to universities being chartered by individual (de facto) states. In England and Scotland, the idea that a "king is an emperor in his own kingdom" – and thus had the right to create universities – was put forward, and Henry VIII of England declared that "this realm of England is an empire". Chartering by de facto authorities could lead to disputes about the validity of charters, as when the Dutch rebels during the Eighty Years' War chartered the University of Leiden in the name of the de jure head of state, Philip II of Spain.

By controlling who was allowed to provide higher education, charters also created monopolies. In England, Oxford and Cambridge successfully defeated attempts to found universities in Northampton, Stamford and Durham in the medieval and early modern periods and prevented University College London from receiving a university charter in 1831. In Belgium, the University of Leuven prevented the foundation of a rival university in Tournai in 1525 and stopped the Jesuits in Leuven from providing secondary education. Having failed to prevent the foundation of the University of Douai, Leuven joined forces with it to have a bar placed on monasteries in the cities of the region giving public classes in philosophy in charters of 1640 and 1670. In Colonial America, Harvard prevented a second college being founded in western Massachusetts in 1762 by arguing that it had been founded as "a provincial monopoly".

== Canada ==
Most Canadian universities derive their degree-granting authority from acts of the relevant provincial legislature (e.g. York University Act). Some older universities, including the University of Toronto and McGill University, derive their authority from a royal charter.

== India ==
In India, a university is established through a formal legislative process.

First, a bill is introduced in either the Parliament of India (for central universities) or the state legislative assembly (for state or private universities). The bill is debated, may be referred to committees, and must be passed by a majority in the relevant house(s) of the legislature. It then receives the assent of the President of India (for central universities) or the Governor of the state (for state or private universities). Once the act is notified in the official gazette, the institution gains legal status as a university and is empowered to confer degrees.

Central universities are created when the Parliament of India passes an act defining their objectives, powers, and governance structure. These institutions are funded and managed by the Government of India through the Ministry of Education and are regulated under the University Grants Commission Act, 1956.

State universities (public) are established through legislation passed by the state legislative assembly of a particular state. They are funded and governed by the respective state governments, but must conform to the guidelines set by the University Grants Commission (UGC).

Private universities are also established through state legislative acts, but they are sponsored and managed by private organizations such as educational trusts or societies. They must comply with the UGC (Establishment and Maintenance of Standards in Private Universities) Regulations, 2003 and obtain recognition from the UGC before they can award degrees.

Once the relevant act is passed and notified, the institution gains legal status as a university, enabling it to confer degrees in accordance with the UGC Act, 1956.

The deemed universities are universities that have been accredited by the UGC, under the Ministry of Education. These universities does not have an act which is passed by an assembly.

== United Kingdom ==
College Charter Act 1871 (Note: Section 1.)
- Act of Parliament
- Parliament of the United Kingdom
- Long title: An Act to amend the Law respecting the granting of Charters in certain cases.
- Citation: 34 & 35 Vict. c. 63
- Territorial extent: United Kingdom

Dates
- Royal assent: 31 July 1871
- Commencement: 31 July 1871 (Note: The Acts of Parliament (Commencement) Act 1793.)
Other legislation
| Amended by | Statute Law Revision (No. 2) Act 1893; Universities (Scotland) Act 1966; Scotland Act 1998 (Consequential Modifications) (No. 2) Order 1999 |

Status: Amended

Text of statute as originally enacted

Revised text of statute as amended

Text of the College Charter Act 1871 as in force today (including any amendments) within the United Kingdom, from legislation.gov.uk.

Most universities founded prior to 1992 were created by royal charter, although a small number were established by acts of Parliament. While standard usage in Britain is to use "chartered" only to refer to institutions with a royal charter, in distinction to "statutory" institutions created by act of Parliament, being established by act of Parliament is sometimes referred to as being "chartered" in international works.

Chartered institutions – those incorporated by royal charter – differ from those established by other means in terms of their powers as a corporation, their legal relationship with the government, and the status of their members. Although university charters are issued as royal charters under the royal prerogative, the College Charter Act 1871 (34 & 35 Vict. c. 63) provides for scrutiny by the Parliament of the United Kingdom (or, since 1999, the Scottish Parliament for institutions based in Scotland) of draft charters that establish "any institution in the nature of a college or university". It has been clarified in written answers to Parliament that the act only applies to "charters founding new universities or colleges", not to any supplemental charters, and that it is the draft charter applied for and the associated petition that are laid before Parliament, not the charter granted.

In the decades following the Scottish Reformation a number of universities were founded in Scotland. The University of Edinburgh was founded by the town corporation under authority granted to it by a royal charter; comparing this charter to the bulls that established the older universities, Grant notes that it is missing all of the elements he identified in the Papal bulls establishing the pre-Reformation universities, and concludes that "Obviously, this is no charter founding a university". Similarly, Charters of Foundation and Early Documents of the Universities of the Coimbra Group says that while this charter was "the effective starting point" of the university, it was "not a foundation charter but a novodamus charter, which confirmed a gift of old ecclesiastical revenues ... and authorised the town council to spend the income on a college teaching arts, theology, medicine, the law or any other branch of the liberal arts".

A few years later, Sir Alexander Fraser was granted a royal charter giving him the right to establish the short-lived Fraserburgh University and conferring on it "all the usual powers and privileges", and Marischal College, Aberdeen (merged into the University of Aberdeen in the 19th century) was established by a charter of George Keith, 5th Earl Marischal, sanctioned by the General Assembly of the Church of Scotland and ratified by the Parliament of Scotland. At around the same time, Elizabeth I established Trinity College Dublin, in Ireland, with a royal charter that named it mater universitatis (mother of a university).

A century later, William III and Mary II granted a royal charter founding the College of William & Mary in the Virginia Colony (the only colonial college charter issued by the English crown rather than by a colonial governor or legislature). While no mention of the college being a university was made in the English version of this charter, the Latin version refers to it as a Studium Generale (translated in the English version as "place of universal study"), the medieval term for a university. It has therefore been said that the charter "by granting William & Mary the legal status of a studium generale, declared it to be a university".

Durham University was founded under the authority of an act of Parliament, the Durham University Act 1832 (occasionally referred to as it being chartered by Parliament). This laid down the governance structure of the university and that it would have professors and readers in various subjects, but did not establish the university. Instead, it granted the chapter of Durham Cathedral the right to found the university. The university was opened in 1833 and then formally constituted a university by the chapter in 1834. It was later incorporated and confirmed by a royal charter in 1837. The University of London received its founding royal charter in 1836, and from then until 1992 all universities were established by royal charter except for Newcastle University, which was separated from Durham and established as an independent university by the Universities of Durham and Newcastle Upon Tyne Act 1963.

Royal charters that found a university generally include a formal statement of foundation such as: "There shall be from henceforth for ever in Our said City of Birmingham a University by the name and style of 'The University of Birmingham'" (Birmingham, 1900), "There shall be and there is hereby constituted and founded in Our County of York a University with the name and style of 'The University of York'" (York, 1963), and "There shall be having its principal seat in the City of Manchester a University having the origins aforesaid by the name and style of 'The University of Manchester'" (Manchester, 2004). The Universities of Durham and Newcastle Upon Tyne Act 1963 used similar language to found Newcastle University, stating: "On and after the appointed day there shall be and there is hearby constituted a university by the name of the University of Newcastle upon Tyne".

Since 1992, almost all new universities have been granted that status by orders under the Further and Higher Education Act 1992 or (in England) the Higher Education and Research Act 2017. However, supplemental charters have been used to confer university status on institutions that already had a royal charter. These have included: Cardiff University (previously part of the University of Wales and chartered in 1884) in 2004; Imperial College London (previously part of the University of London and chartered in 1907) in 2007; other chartered former colleges of the University of Wales, including the supplemental charter granted to the University of Wales, Lampeter (originally granted a collegiate charter, rather than a university charter, in 1828 as St David's College) in 2010 to form the University of Wales Trinity Saint David by merger with Trinity College Carmarthen; and chartered member institutions of the University of London that became universities within the federation following the University of London Act 2018. A new royal charter was granted to the University of Manchester in 2004 on the merger of the Victoria University of Manchester and the University of Manchester Institute of Science and Technology, which formed a new corporation and granted it university status.

== United States ==
In the US, an act of legislature that establishes a corporation is referred to as a "charter".

=== Colonial ===
Prior to the American Revolution, the nine colonial colleges were either established by royal or gubernatorial charters issued under prerogative powers, or chartered by colonial legislatures. These charters remained in force after US independence, and the Dartmouth College Case determined that its charter had the force of a contract and was thus protected from impairment by the state legislature under the Contract Clause of the US constitution. With the possible exception of the College of William and Mary, these were all collegiate charters rather than university charters, with none of the colleges taking the title of university during the colonial period.

=== Federal ===
There are several universities which are congressionally-chartered, due to their location within District of Columbia. These include:

- American University,
- Gallaudet University,
- Georgetown University,
- Howard University, and
- George Washington University.

The Institute of American Indian Arts was chartered by the federal congress in 1986.

The United States service (military) academies are not chartered, as they are agencies of the federal government itself.

=== State ===
Other universities are approved or authorized by state or territorial legislatures — sometimes via explicit charter — and may be public or private universities. The first state charter was issued by the Georgia General Assembly in 1785, establishing the University of Georgia. Other examples include the charters issued by the State of New York for New York University and Cornell University, or the charter of the University System of New Hampshire, part of the state statutes, which establishes the University of New Hampshire and other state colleges within the system. Sometimes, as with Penn State University, the "charter" is a collection of acts and decrees from state bodies rather than a single document. Acts that create universities may also be referred to as charters even when not explicitly described as such, as in the case of the California state legislature's organic act of 23 March 1868 that created the University of California, celebrated since 1874 as 'charter day'.
