= Third-oldest university in England debate =

Debate since the mid-19th century

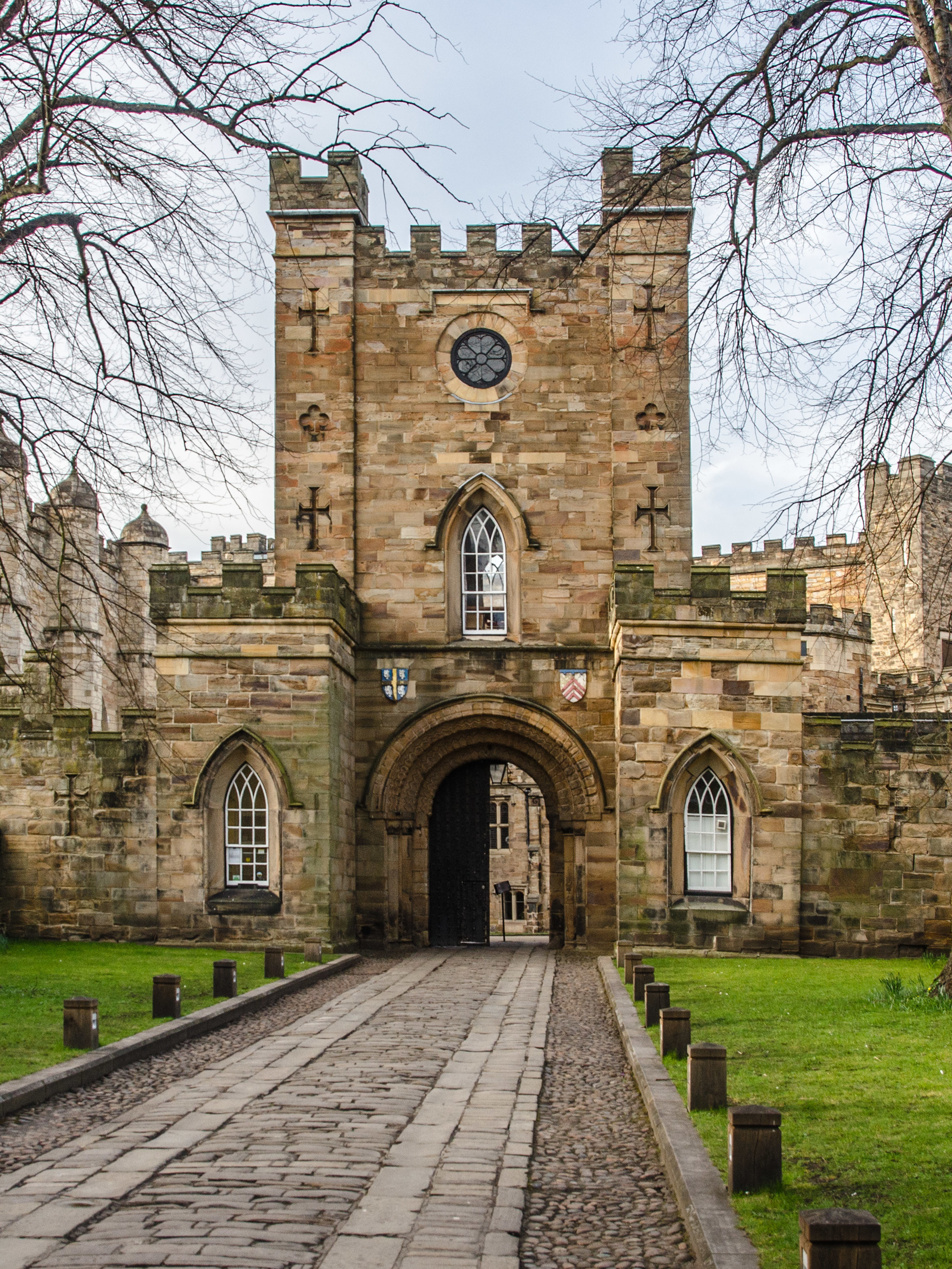
Durham University

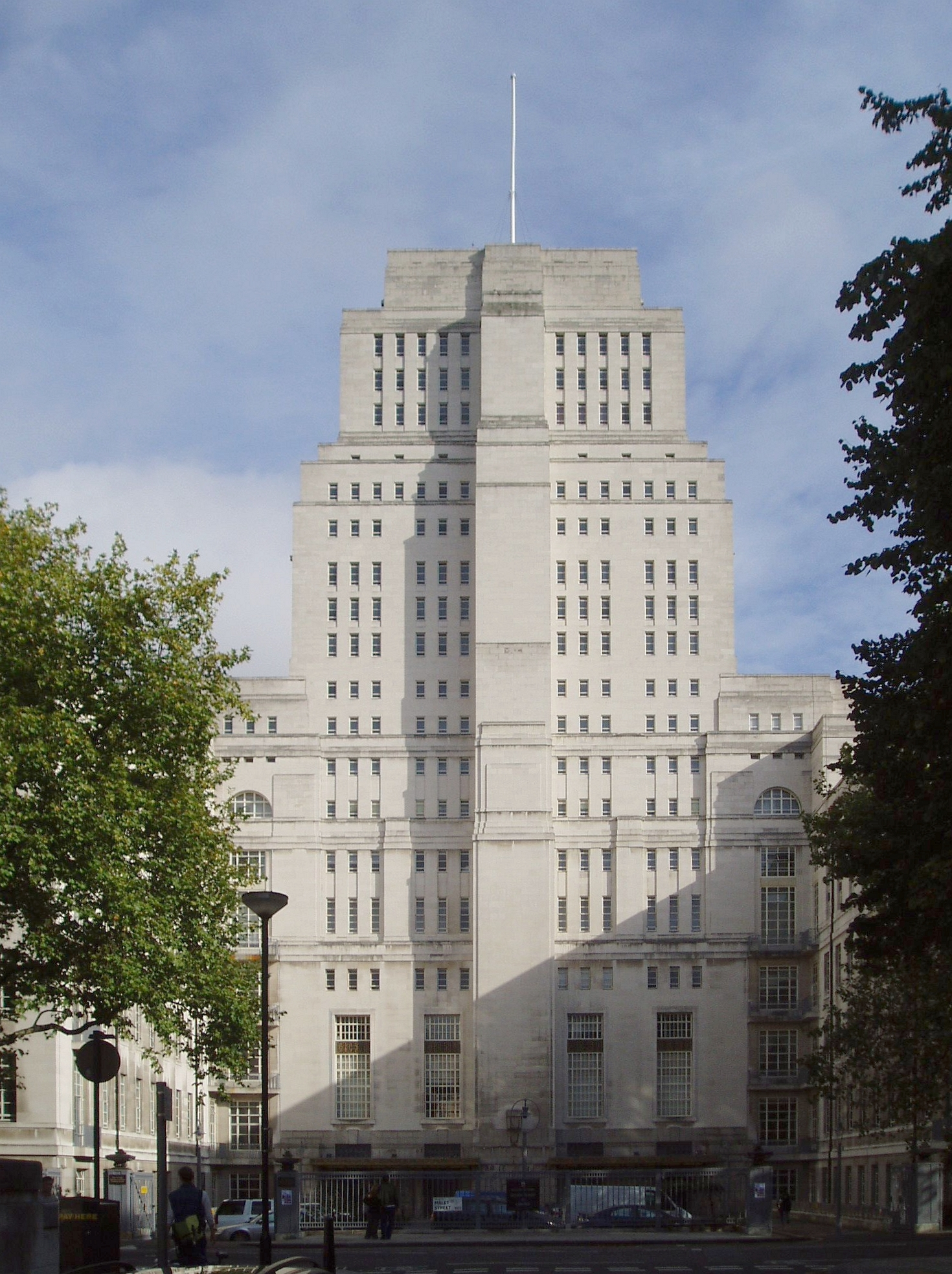
University of London

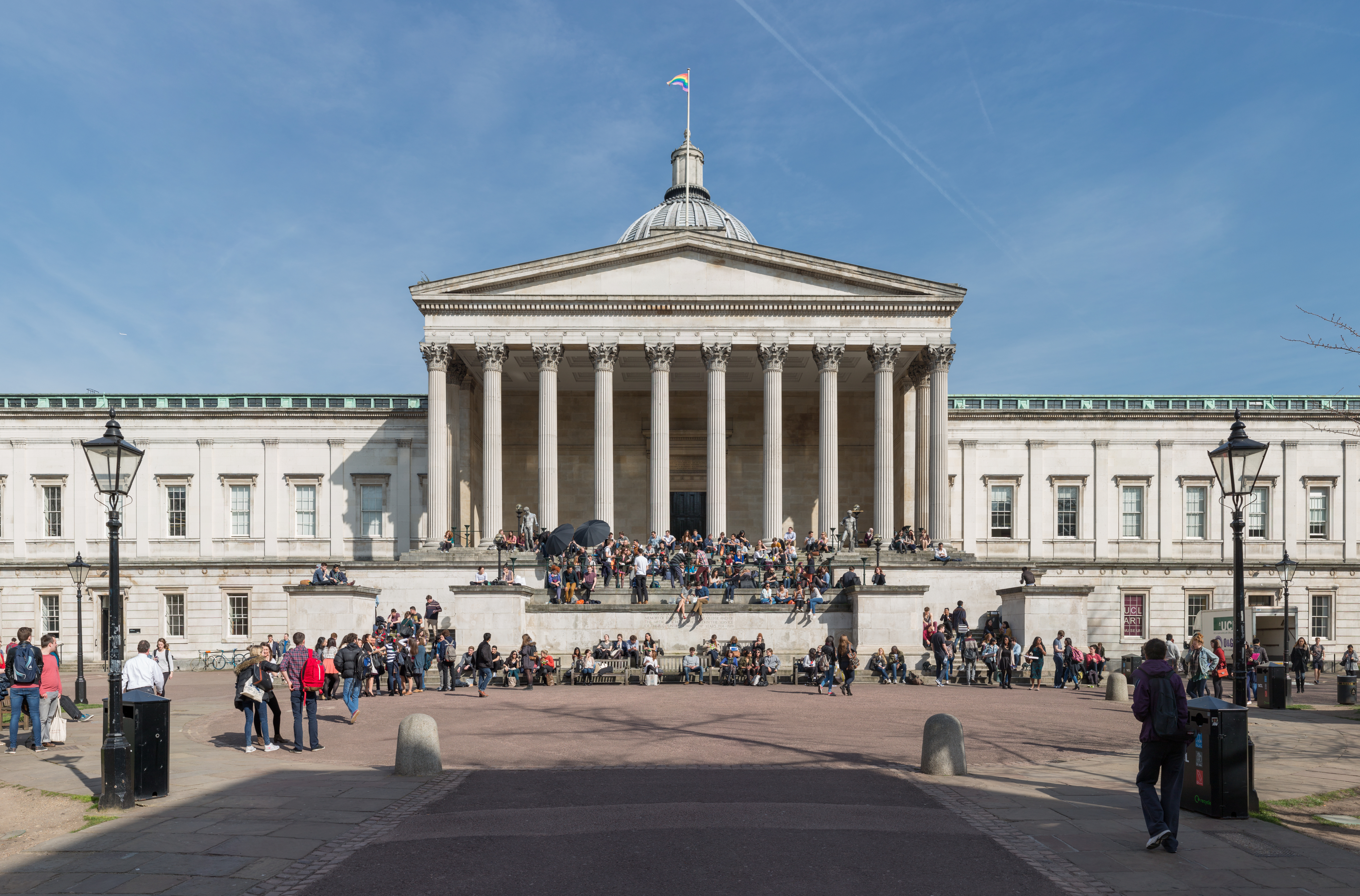
University College London

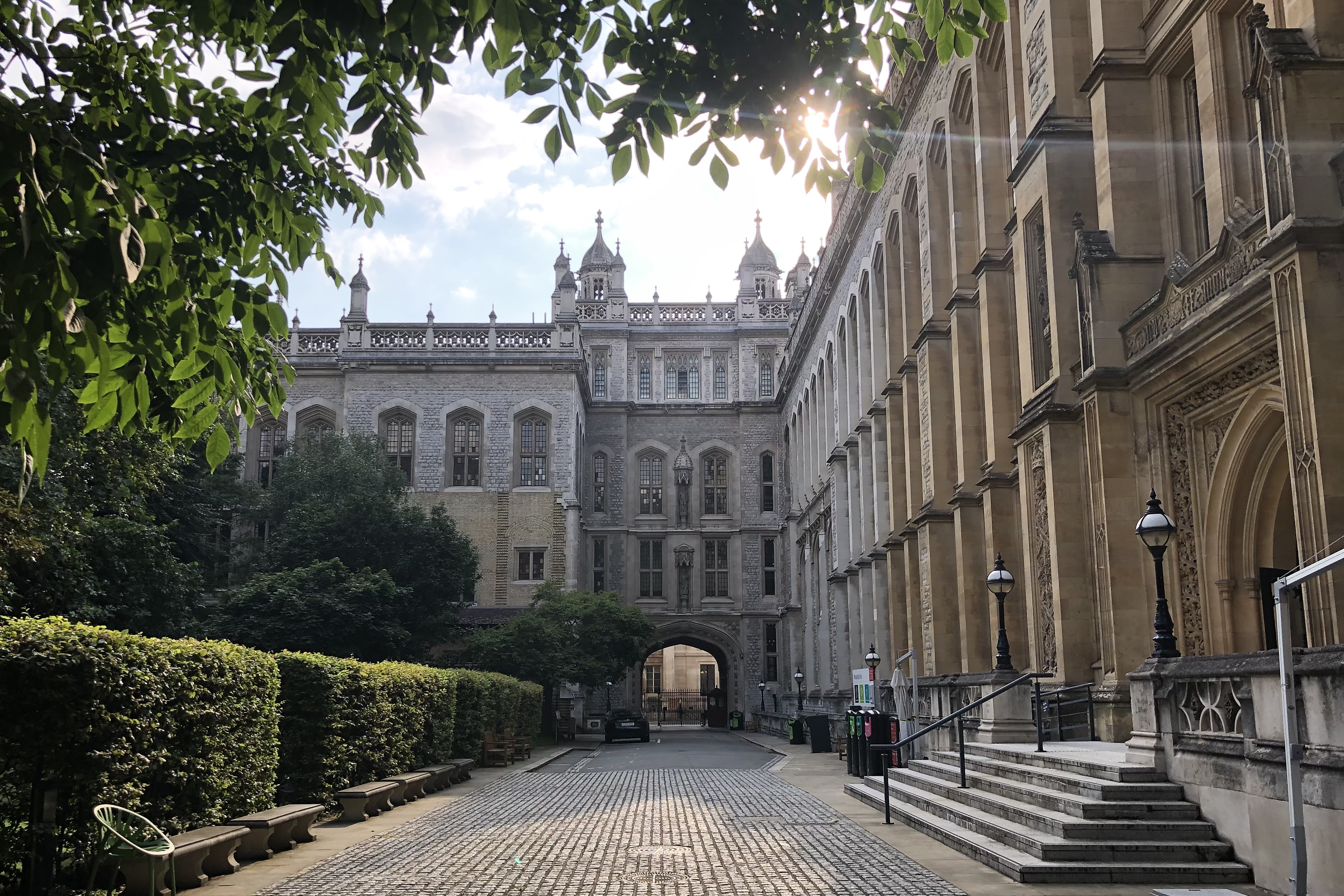
King's College London

The third-oldest university in England debate (Note: Following the establishment of the universities of Oxford and Cambridge in the 13th century.) has been carried out since the mid-19th century, with rival claims being made originally by Durham University as the third-oldest officially recognised university (1832) and the third to confer degrees (1837) and the University of London as the third university to be granted a royal charter (1836). These have been joined more recently by University College London as it was founded as London University (1826) and was the third-oldest university institution to start teaching (1828) and by King's College London (which officially claims to be the fourth-oldest university in England but is claimed by some students to be the third-oldest as the third university institution to receive a royal charter, in 1829). Most historians identify Durham as the third-oldest, following standard practice in how a university is defined and how this is applied historically, although the popular press is more divided.

There were various other attempts to establish a third university in England, including short-lived medieval studia in Northampton (1238 to 1265), Salisbury (1238 to before 1300) and Stamford (1333 to 1335), none of which ever attained recognition as a university. The 17th-century New College, Durham (1653 to 1660), was similarly stymied by the opposition of the older universities and never received university powers.

== Background ==
=== Medieval period ===
In the late 12th century, a number of English cathedral schools were known as centres of learning. Lincoln "probably came very close to developing into a university". It was ranked alongside Paris, Bologna and Oxford for the study of law by Peter of Blois in 1176, and Gerald of Wales said in the 1190s that it was the most renowned centre for the study of theology in England. Hereford was known for the quadrivium and associated scientific and mathematical studies. Exeter was known for theology and law, and York also for theology. There were three schools of liberal arts in London, based around St Paul's Cathedral, the church of St Martin-le-Grand and the church of St Mary Arches, and it is likely that there were also schools of law until these were suppressed in 1234. None of these, however, became universities.

Outside of the cathedral cities, Oxford had schools from at least the middle of the 12th century, which were reinforced by scholars moving from the University of Paris. Northampton was also known for its schools in the 12th century, when it may have been a more important centre than Oxford. However, from 1193 it was Oxford that attracted royal patronage, leading historians to theorise a migration from Northampton to Oxford around 1192.

The schools at Oxford became organised into the University of Oxford in the early 13th century. A dispute at Oxford in 1209 led to scholars dispersing to Paris, Reading and Cambridge, where they founded the University of Cambridge.

Another dispute in 1238 saw some scholars from Oxford migrate to Salisbury and Northampton, where they formed studia. The University of Northampton was encouraged in 1261 by a royal charter from Henry III that allowed the migration of scholars from Cambridge to join the earlier migrants from Oxford. This charter commanded the townsfolk of Northampton to "hold the scholars when they come to live in the borough aforesaid as recommended by us, and receive them courteously, and maintain them as the estate of scholars demands; not putting nor allowing to be put any impediment, molestation or grievance upon them". However, within three years of this, scholars (including more recent arrivals from Oxford) sided with supporters of Simon de Montfort, who was a patron of the university, during the siege of the town and its castle in April 1264. Less than a year later, Henry III revoked Northampton's charter, citing significant opposition from Oxford as the cause. His letter to the town burgesses stated: "we ... firmly order that there shall henceforth be no University in our said town, and that you shall not allow any students to remain there otherwise than was customary before the creation of the said University". Hastings Rashdall concluded that: "It is in all probability to the capture of Northampton by Henry III that we owe the fact ... that England possesses no more than two ancient Universities."

The same dispersion from Oxford in 1238 also saw some scholars migrate to Salisbury and establish a studium there. The College of the Valley Scholars was established there in 1262 and the College of St Edmund in 1269. An agreement between the chancellor and sub-dean of Salisbury Cathedral in 1278 confirmed that there were then multiple masters at the studium, belonging to more than one faculty. However, by 1300 "the incipient university at Salisbury seems to have disappeared", although the colleges persisted in some form until the Reformation.

Both Oxford and Cambridge are acknowledged as having become universities by custom, as were other early universities such as Bologna, Paris and Montpellier. Many of these institutions received papal bulls confirming their status as studia generalia in the late 13th or early 14th century, including Cambridge in 1318. Oxford, however, never received this and thus continued to operate as a university purely by custom, without formal confirmation that it was a studium generale and entitled to the associated rights, including the ius ubique docendi. Verger notes that it "can hardly be said to have suffered from the want of it".

In 1333, rebellious tutors and students from Oxford, including some from Merton College and Brasenose Hall, tried to establish the University of Stamford in Lincolnshire, but Edward III ordered the rebels to return to Oxford after lobbying from both Oxford and Cambridge. After the suppression of the university at Stamford, graduates from the universities of Oxford and Cambridge were required to swear oaths not to lecture outside those two universities, and concerted efforts were made by those universities against the foundation of any further universities in England for the next five centuries, during which time five universities opened in Scotland and over 100 on the continent of Europe.

=== Early modern period ===
After Durham College, Oxford was suppressed in 1540, Henry VIII planned to establish a college in Durham, but this came to nothing. Gresham College was established in London in 1596 to make university learning available there, but was academically dependent on Oxford and Cambridge and did not develop.

The four Inns of Court in London, together with the associated Inns of Chancery, formed a recognised centre of legal and intellectual education, and – although never a university in any technical sense – were sometimes collectively described in the early modern period as England's "third university". Most notably, this claim was made in Sir George Buck's tract, "The Third Universitie of England: Or a Treatise of the Foundations of all the Colledges, Auncient Schooles of Priviledge, and of Houses of Learning, and Liberall Arts, within and about the Most Famous Cittie of London", published in 1615 as an appendix to John Stow's Annales, or Generall Chronicle of England.

Further proposals for a northern university included Ripon (in 1590, 1596 and 1604), York and Manchester in 1641, and Durham in 1651, as well as a University of London, taking in Gresham College. Durham was approved by Oliver Cromwell and a college was established there in 1653, with letters patent issued on 15 May 1657, but a petition for degree-awarding powers was denied by Richard Cromwell in 1660 following counter-petitions from Oxford and Cambridge, and the college closed with the restoration of the monarchy later in that year.

== History of the foundations ==
It was not until the first half of the 19th century that a third university-level institution was successfully established, when University College London, King's College London, Durham University, and the University of London were all set up. There were unsuccessful proposals around the same time, including at York (1825), Leeds (1826), and Bath, Newcastle and Manchester in the 1830s. The "Stamford Oath" was abolished at Oxford and Cambridge in 1827. However, this continued to cause problems for the new foundations. Temple Chevallier had qualms about taking a post at Durham, having sworn the oath at his Cambridge MA graduation, but found that the Cambridge authorities in the 1830s were willing to turn a blind eye to graduates taking up posts at the new institutions. Despite this, in 1841 George Peacock published a book on Cambridge's statutes that stated: "It would thus appear that no master of arts or superior graduate of Oxford or Cambridge, consistently with the oath of creation, can acknowledge or accept the degrees of the University of Durham, or become a professor in it." Peacock made no reference to London, leading Chevallier to believe this was a personal attack on him.

The five year period from 1828 to 1833 saw an unprecedented expansion of higher education in England, with three university-level institutions opening. The first was UCL, founded as a joint stock company under the name London University in 1826, which opened in 1828. Whether a university could be founded in this manner was hotly debated, with the institution being widely considered illegitimate, and it was denied official recognition. King's College was founded as a counter to UCL and was granted a charter in 1829, helped by not claiming to be a university or intending to award degrees. Durham was designed from its conception in 1831 to be a full university with degree-awarding powers but did not initially seek a royal charter. The university was instead founded under the authority of the Durham University Act 1832 and opened in 1833. In 1836 the University of London was established to solve the problem of having two competing colleges in London and to clarify their status, with UCL taking the name "University College, London". For the first time, England had higher education institutions besides Oxford and Cambridge that would maintain a sustained existence.

=== University College London ===
Following attempts by Henry Brougham in 1825 to establish the institution via a royal charter, which the government refused, or by an act of Parliament, which was blocked by the influence of Oxford and Cambridge, UCL was established on 11 February 1826 as a joint-stock company under the name of "University of London". The foundation stone for the main building was laid by Prince Augustus Frederick, Duke of Sussex, a brother of King George IV, in 1827 and the college opened for teaching on 1 October 1828.

UCL applied for a charter in late 1830 or early 1831 that would grant it "Incorporation as an University, with all the privileges incident to that title", but without an explicit mention of degree-awarding power. In February of that year it was reported that "a charter, which now only awaits the royal signature, is to be granted to the University of London", but following opposition from Oxford and Cambridge the application for the charter stalled. The application was renewed in 1833, but again stalled with Oxford and Cambridge's opposition being joined by the London medical schools. In 1835 the House of Commons voted in favour of a petition to the king to grant a charter along the lines of that approved in 1831. However, the government chose instead to grant UCL a charter as a college, rather than as a university, and to found the University of London as a separate body.

Lord Brougham, the chair of UCL's council, told a meeting of the proprietors that accepting this charter meant surrendering their claim to be a university, saying "it went a little to his heart … to sink into a college when they had originally started as an university" but that "for his own part he would rather accept it", which the proprietors voted unanimously to do. It was described as "a barren collegiate Charter" by William Tooke, who had led the parliamentary campaign for UCL's recognition as a university, and John Robson, Secretary of UCL in the 1870s, told the Royal Commission on Scientific Instruction and the Advancement of Science in 1872 that "in March 1835, the House of Commons, by a large majority—246 to 136—adopted an address to the King, praying him to grant a charter of incorporation to 'the University of London', which would have enabled it to grant degrees; and, consequently, that what the institution was asked to surrender in favour of the University founded in 1837 [sic], was not merely its designation, but the position which it had acquired through that vote of the House of Commons, and the importance of which had been distinctly recognized by successive Governments." An official history issued by the University of London in 1912 as a supplement to the calendar stated that "The friends and supporters of University College cordially welcomed the Government plan, although it gave them far less than they had at first demanded, and although acceptance of it implied the renunciation of all claim to exercise the full functions of a University, and placed them on a footing of equality with some younger and less important institutions." In November 1838, the first UCL students matriculated in the new University of London and the first London degrees were awarded in May 1839.

UCL was not granted university status and the attendant right of awarding degrees during the 19th century, and it does not feature on 19th-century lists of universities in England. However the use of "university" in its name was known to cause confusion: in an article for the Journal of Education in 1888, Edith Wilson stated: "There are five, and only five, universities in England. (I begin by starting this explicitly because the name University College so often misleads even those familiar with the language of the educational world.) These five are Oxford, Cambridge, Durham, London, and Victoria."

After the University of London was reconstituted as a federal body in 1900, UCL surrendered its property and independence and was merged into the University of London under the 1905 University College London (Transfer) Act, which went into effect in 1907. It was not until 1977 that UCL once more became an autonomous institute, and not until 1993 that it (along with the other colleges) received government funding from HEFCE as an independent institution rather than getting an allocation from the University of London's grant. UCL received degree awarding powers on 27 September 2005, and the first UCL degrees were awarded in summer 2008. In 2019 UCL, along with King's and 10 other colleges of the University of London, applied for university status following the passing of the University of London Act 2018. This was approved in 2022 and a supplemental charter granting university status was sealed 17 April 2023.

=== King's College London ===
King's College London was established by Royal Charter on 14 August 1829 as "King's College, London", a reaction to UCL with the aim of providing an Anglican education. KCL was able to receive its charter quickly in part because it was not seeking to become a university, and in part because of its outlook on religion being an essential part of education – both in sharp contrast to its rival. The existence of King's also gave the establishment another excuse to deny UCL university status: it would mean doing the same for King's, creating two universities for one city. This eventually led to the compromise of forming the University of London to examine students from both colleges. It was chartered as a college, not a university; the term "university" does not appear in the charter. The 150th anniversary history of the college states that: "No attempt was to be made to form a University which had the power of conferring its own degrees: the task of King’s College was to prepare men for a commercial career, or for other universities if they sought after a degree or ordination."

The college opened its doors to students in 1831. Students at King's either left for degrees at Oxford and Cambridge, gained medical qualifications through the Royal Colleges, or (from 1834) took the Associate of King's College (first awarded in June 1835); the college did not award degrees of its own.

Following the establishment of the University of London in 1836, King's became an associated college of that university, allowing its students to sit examinations for London degrees. However, students were still encouraged to take the AKC rather than the London degree – which was also open to "godless" UCL students. It also made agreements with Durham and Edinburgh to allow King's College London students to take degrees at those universities with only one year of residence.

King's surrendered its autonomy to be merged into the University of London from 1910 to 1980, and was funded as an independent institution rather than through the University of London after 1993. King's gained degree awarding powers in July 2006, awarding its first degrees in summer 2008. In 2019 King's, along with UCL and 10 other colleges of the University of London, applied for university status following the passing of the University of London Act 2019. This was approved in 2022 and a supplemental charter granting university status was sealed 18 May 2023.

=== Durham University ===
Durham University had its formal beginnings in an act of the Chapter of Durham Cathedral on 21 September 1831 that established an "Academical Institution or College or University", followed by a second act of Chapter on 28 September which resolved to accept "A plan of an academic institution, to be called Durham College, in connexion with the Dean and Chapter". By December of that year, the "college" was being advertised as a "university", with the prospectus appearing in London newspapers. On 4 July 1832, Parliament passed the Durham University Act 1832, "An Act to enable the Dean and Chapter of Durham to appropriate Part of the Property of their Church to the Establishment of a University in connexion therewith for the Advancement of Learning". Students were admitted to degree programmes from 28 October 1833, with the first calendar (autumn 1833) advertising the institution as "University of Durham founded by Act of Chapter with the Consent of the Bishop of Durham 28 September 1831. Constituted a University by Act of Parliament 2nd and 3rd William IV., Sess. 1831–2." However, the act did not directly found the university, rather it authorised the cathedral chapter to establish the university. This it did formally with an Act of Chapter on 4 April 1834, which resolved "that the Academical Institution or College or University established by Act of Chapter, 21st September 1831, be constituted a University".

Following its opening in 1833, the university awarded its first Licence in Theology (which only required a one-year course for those who were already graduates of Oxford, Cambridge or Dublin) in 1834. The first exams for the Bachelor of Arts were held in 1836 and the first exams for the Master of Arts in 1837. Following the practice of Oxford, the first BAs were conferred a year later, in 1837. The first honorary degree, a Doctor of Civil Law, was conferred on Earl Grey in 1838 for his support as Prime Minister of the establishment of the university.

The university was referred to as "the University of Durham" in two public acts of Parliament prior to the granting of its charter: the Municipal Corporations Act 1835, and the Established Church Act 1836. Durham was incorporated by a royal charter granted on 1 June 1837, which explicitly referred to the university already having "established under our Royal sanction, and the authority of our Parliament", and the first degrees were conferred on 8 June 1837. This charter did not establish the university but rather confirmed the university status of the existing body. The explanatory memorandum to the University of Durham Act 1908 (8 Edw. 7. c. 20) states that "The University was established in 1834 by a Statute of the dean and chapter of the cathedral church of Durham, made in pursuance of an Act of Parliament of 1832, and was incorporated by Royal Charter in 1837 under the name of the 'Warden, Masters, and Scholars of the University of Durham.'"

The Solicitors Act 1837, which extended various privileges related to admission to the legal profession of Oxford, Cambridge and Dublin graduates to Durham and London, similarly confirmed that Durham was established as a university under the authority of the 1832 act and that the effect of the 1837 charter was to incorporate the pre-existing university, in contrast to London which was established by royal charter. The act states "And whereas … a Body Politic and Corporate by the Name of the University of London has been constituted by the Royal Charter of His late Majesty King William the Fourth, and an University having been founded and established in connexion with the Cathedral Church at Durham under the Authority of an Act passed in the Second and Third years of the Reign of His said late Majesty ... And whereas since the passing of the said last-mentioned Act a Royal Charter of Incorporation had been granted to the University of Durham".

=== University of London ===
The University of London was established and chartered in 1836 as a degree awarding body. It received a second charter in 1837, a third in 1858 and a fourth in 1863, under which it is now incorporated. It matriculated is first students in November 1838 (from UCL and King's College London) and awarded its first degrees in May 1839 (again to students from UCL and King's College London). In 1900 it was reconstituted as a federal university by statutes drawn up under the University of London Act 1898, including as schools of the university both UCL and King's College London, along with a number of other colleges in London.

London was incorporated under its 1836 charter "during Our Royal Will and Pleasure". Sources give differing interpretations on what this meant, with some saying the charter expired on the death of William IV (20 June 1837), and others that it may never have been valid but if it were it would have expired 6 months after the king's death (i.e. 20 December 1837). The university was re-incorporated by a second royal charter on 5 December 1837. This date is sometimes given in Victorian sources as the founding of the university, and is the date used as the date of creation in the supplemental charter of 1850 and the charters of 1858 and 1863.

As founded, the University of London was "an examining board appointed by the government", and the lack of teaching in the university led to criticism that it was not a true university. Henry Wace, Principal of King's College London, told a royal commission in 1888 that he "had two ... objections to the title of the University of London: one, that it is not a University, and the other that it is not of London". In a similar vein, Karl Pearson, a professor at UCL, said that "[t]o term the body which examines at Burlington House a University is a perversion of language, to which no charter or Act of Parliament can give a real sanction". Some modern historians have taken a similar line, describing the University of London of that era as "a Government department, in the form of a board of examiners with power to matriculate students and award degrees ... it had the trappings of a university, but not its most obvious function—it did not teach", and as "what would today be called a quango". The problems thrown up by the lack of teaching in the university led eventually to its reconstitution as a federal teaching and research institution in 1900.

=== Degree awarding powers ===
Related to the question of university status was the question of degree awarding powers. At this period, "the absence of a Royal Charter was generally held to deny degree-giving powers to a body with no outside authority for calling itself a university". Thus, although various objections were raised to the granting of a charter to UCL, all of the opposing parties agreed that a grant of university title would confer the right to award degrees as incident upon that title. Without an official grant of university title, UCL did not grant degrees, and a proposal in 1830 to introduce a degree of "M. Med. et Chir. U. L." was not carried out, although legal controls on unrecognised degrees were not introduced until the Education Reform Act 1988. When Brougham (then Lord Chancellor) asked during the debate on UCL's application for a charter in the Privy Council in 1834, "Pray, Mr. Bickersteth, what is to prevent the London University [i.e. UCL] granting degrees now?" he received the reply: "The universal scorn and contempt of mankind."

William Tooke, who led the parliamentary campaign for the recognition of UCL as the University of London, told the House of Commons in 1833 that: "It is not generally known, that no university whatever is entitled to confer degrees, by grant of any Charter whatever, the claim so to do being considered as incident to the name and title of University". Similarly, Sir Charles Wetherell, arguing against the grant of a university charter to UCL before the Privy Council in 1834 said that: "It will be necessary to examine this subject a little more minutely, and particularly with reference to the power of conferring degrees, and the nature of a university. The only place where I can find any legal discussion on matters so little brought under consideration as these, is the argument of Mr. Attorney General Yorke, in Dr. Bentley's case, which is reported in 2nd Lord Raymond, 1345 ... In this proposition of Mr. Yorke two principles are laid down. The first is that 'granting degrees flows from the Crown'; and the second is, that if 'a University be erected, the power of granting degrees is incidental to the grant'. ... The subject matter granted, is the power of covering degrees; an emanation, as Mr. Yorke expresses it, from the Crown. It is the concession of this power that constitutes the direct purpose and the essential character of a University." (Note: The two differed on whether it was possible for the degree awarding powers of a university to be limited – UCL were requesting a charter with a restriction on granting degrees in theology, which Wetherell claimed was not possible)

However, disputes over Durham's powers demonstrated that it was not clear that being granted the status of a university conferred degree awarding powers. The liberal Sir William Hamilton, wrote a response to Wetherell's argument before the Privy Council in the Edinburgh Review arguing that historically the power to award specific degrees was explicitly granted, and thus the recognition of an institution as a university did not, in itself, grant any power to award degrees: "But when it has been seriously argued before the Privy Council by Sir Charles Wetherell, on behalf of the English Universities ... that the simple fact of the crown incorporating an academy under the name of university, necessarily, and in spite of reservations, concedes to that academy the right of granting all possibly degrees; nay when (as we are informed) the case itself has actually occurred, – the "Durham University", inadvertently, it seems, incorporated under that title, being in the course of claiming the exercise of this very privilege as a right, necessarily involved in the public recognition of the name – in these circumstances we shall be pardoned a short excursus, in order to expose the futility of the basis on which this mighty edifice is erected."

Hamilton went on to conclude: "In like manner, in all the Universities throughout Europe, which were not merely privileged, but created by bull and charter, every liberty was conferred not as an incident, through implication, but by express concession. And this in two ways: – For a University was empowered, either by an explicit grant of certain enumerated rights, or by bestowing on it implicitly the known privileges enjoyed by certain other pattern Universities. These modes were frequently conjoined, but we make bold to say, that there is not to be found, throughout Europe, one example of a University erected without the grant of determinate privileges, – far less of a University, thus erected, enjoying, through this omission, privileges of any, far less of every other. – In particular, the right of granting degrees, and that in how many faculties, must (in either way) be expressly conferred." However, historians have shown this conclusion to be incorrect. Hastings Rashdall states that "the special privilege of the jus ubique docendi [the precursor to the modern degree] ... was usually, but not quite invariably, conferred in express terms by the original foundation-bulls; and was apparently understood to be involved in the mere act of erection even in the rare cases where it is not expressly conceded". Patrick Zutshi, Keeper of Manuscripts and University Archives in Cambridge University Library, writes that "Cambridge never received from the papacy an explicit grant of the ius ubique docendi, but it is generally considered that the right is implied in the terms of John XXII's letter of 1318 concerning Cambridge's status as a studium generale."

William van Mildert, the Bishop of Durham, had said during the passage of the act in 1832 that "[N]or ought the privilege of conferring degrees, if hereafter committed to the University by charter, to be thrown open indiscriminately to non-conformists of every description, in common with members of the Established Church." In a similar vein, William Clayton Walters, a Newcastle barrister who the university consulted with, said in 1832 that there was nothing the university wanted from a royal charter at that time "except the power to grant degrees". However, by 1833 Thorp wrote to Van Mildert that "the Dean and Chapter are anxious to ascertain the place and value of the Degrees in due time to be conferred by virtue of the Act of Parliament which constitutes Durham a University". Subsequently, the university announced in 1835 that it would confer degrees, after taking further legal advice from Walters as to whether it had the authority to do so under the Act of Parliament, and just over a month later passed a "fundamental statute" that included provision for the awarding of degrees.

After Van Mildert's death in February 1836, Thorp wrote to the Prime Minister, Lord Melbourne, noting that degree awarding powers might be "inherent in a University instituted by the highest authority of the nation", but that it would be desirable to have either a charter or a legal declaration that one was unnecessary (no response is recorded). The university again sought Wetherell's counsel on the matter of the charter in March, and were advised to avoid mention of degree awarding powers but solely to seek incorporation as a university; stating that both his personal opinion and the orthodox opinion were that "the word university carries degrees". The petition submitted followed this advice, omitting mention of degrees and seeking only incorporation and the power to hold property. The opinion of the Chapter of Durham Cathedral (the governors of the university) in 1837 remained that the university had the power to award degrees under the 1832 Act of Parliament and that, although a royal charter would enhance the perception of those degrees, the university would proceed to award degrees that year whether or not a charter was issued. However, this was not put to the test as the charter was granted.

=== Timeline ===
Year	Durham	London	UCL	King's
1826			11 February: UCL established as a joint-stock company under the name of "University of London"	
1827			30 April: Foundation stone laid	
1828				21 June: A public meeting chaired by the prime minister, the Duke of Wellington, resolved to found King's College
1828			1 October: UCL opened	
1829				14 August: King's College London established by royal charter
1830			Degree of M. Med. et Chir. U. L. proposed	
1831			February: Newspapers reported that a charter as a university had been passed by the legal officers of the crown and was awaiting the royal signature	
1831	21 & 28 September: Durham Cathedral chapter passed acts establishing an "academical institution"			
1831				8 October: King's opened
1832	4 July: The University of Durham Act received royal assent			
1833	28 October: Durham University opened and first students matriculated onto degree courses			
1834				14 February: King's College council instituted the Associate of King's College
1834	4 April: Durham Cathedral chapter passed an act constituting the academical institute founded in 1831 a university, in accordance with the University of Durham Act 1832			
1834			24 April: Renewed application for a charter as a university debated before the Privy Council	
1834	Easter Term: First examinations for and award of the Licence in Theology			
1835			26 March: House of Commons voted in favour of praying the King to grant a charter to UCL as a university	
1835	13 June: Durham University announces after taking legal advice that it will confer degrees			
1835				27 June: First award of the Associate of King's College
1835	20 July: Durham University's fundamental statute was passed by the cathedral chapter			
1835		30 July: The government announced their intention to establish "a Metropolitan University" in response to the House of Commons' prayer that UCL be granted a charter as a university, with UCL to be granted a charter as a college		
1836		28 November: The University of London established by royal charter	28 November: UCL incorporated by royal charter as "University College, London"	
1837	1 June: Durham incorporated by royal charter			
1837	8 June: First Durham degrees awarded			
1837	15 July: The Attornies and Solicitors Act, giving London and Durham degrees equal privilege to those of Oxford, Cambridge and Dublin, received royal assent			
1837		5 December: University of London reincorporated by a second royal charter		
1838		November: First students from UCL and King's matriculate at the University of London		
1839		May: First University of London degrees awarded to students from UCL and King's		

References for the dates given in this table can be found in the sections above.

== History of the debate ==
The debate over which is the oldest of the universities founded in the early 19th century has been going on (originally between London and Durham) since at least the mid 19th century. Durham was referred to as England's third university in 1841. In 1853, however, Lord Brougham secured London's precedence in the Charitable Trusts Act on the grounds of it having the earlier charter; but in the Medical Act 1858 Durham was given precedence. The topic also came up in the House of Commons during a speech by the Chancellor of the Exchequer at the committee stage of the Reform Act 1867, the chancellor originally claiming that London was the older but accepting a correction that "Durham is the older University". At the opening of the Victoria University in 1880, the Duke of Devonshire (who had been the first chancellor of the University of London, was chancellor of Cambridge University, and was being installed as the first chancellor of the Victoria University) was reported in Manchester and Leeds as saying in his speech that Durham predated London, but in Dundee as saying the opposite. Dod's Peerage, Baronetage and Knightage stated that precedence should be given to London, giving the dates of foundation as those of the royal charters. Durham, however, was given precedence at the quatercentenary of the University of Aberdeen in 1906, and was also named as the elder in a 1905 article by Richard Claverhouse Jebb, president of the Educational Science Section of the British Association for the Advancement of Science.

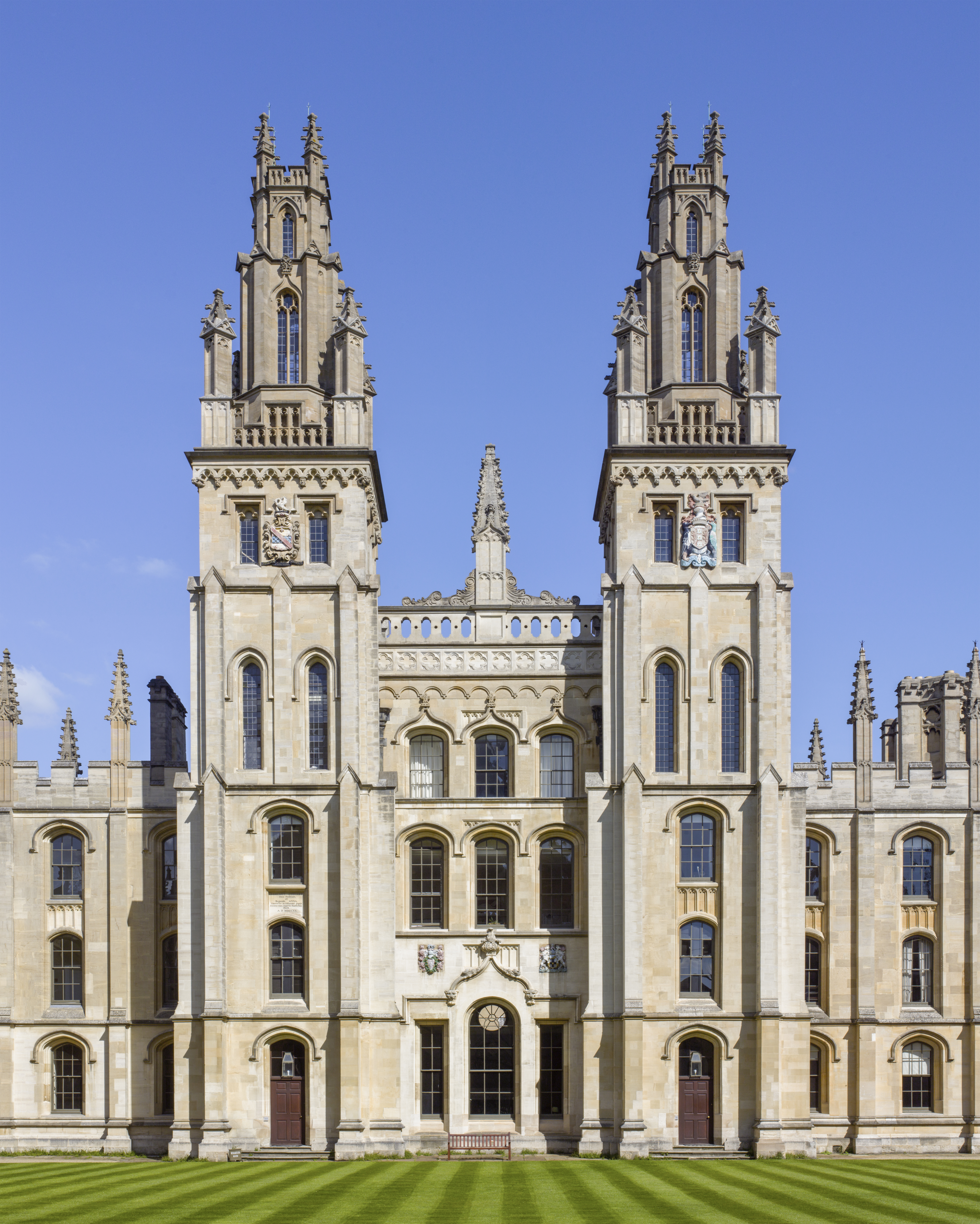
Oxford, the oldest university in England (All Souls College pictured)

This early period of debate appears to have all but ended by 1906, when Sir Arthur William Rucker, principal of the University of London, named Durham as the third University to be successfully established in England in a speech to a delegation from Paris and other French universities who were visiting the University of London, although Viscount Bryce named London as the elder in a speech at the University of Liverpool in 1914. Through most of the 20th century, Durham's claim appears to have gone unchallenged. It was named as the "third oldest university in England" in the Proceedings of the International Assembly of the Inter-state Post-Graduate Medical Association of North America in 1930; Lord Londonderry (Durham's Chancellor) called it "in some sort the mother of modern universities in the United Kingdom" in 1931; the Society of Chemical Industry referred to Durham as "the third University to be established in England" in 1937; a guide published by the Universities Bureau of the British Empire and the British Council in 1937 gave (for the non-ancient universities) the order Durham, London, Manchester, etc.; the press repeatedly named it as third oldest; it was named as "the third oldest University in the country" in Parliament in 1962; Dod's, who had earlier given precedence to London, revised their listing between 1961 and 1967 in favour of Durham; and social anthropologist Joan Abbott recorded in 1971 that "The fact that Durham is the third oldest university in England was the first thing the author was told again and again soon after arrival".

In 1986, however, London's claim was reasserted by Negley Harte in his 150th anniversary history. Durham's claim was also directly disputed by UCL in 1998. All three of the claimants have often since asserted that they are the third oldest, and thus all have featured in the press identified as such over the last 20 years. (Note: Durham in 1998, Durham in 2001, London in 2005, Durham, with acknowledgement of debate in 2007, London in 2007, Durham in 2009, Durham in 2010, Durham in 2015, UCL with acknowledgement of debate in 2015, Durham in 2015, London in 2015.) Both The Independent's and the Daily Telegraph's university guides have hedged their bets, giving the title to both UCL and Durham, while referring to King's College London as "the fourth oldest university institution". King's students, however, have pushed their claim to be the third oldest university. The debate also spilled over into Scotland in 2007, when The Guardian mistakenly called Durham the "third oldest university in the UK" (rather than in England). In 2016, Durham Magazine published an article on the debate, concluding that "Despite all the above arguments, most people consider Durham to be England's third oldest university". The Telegraph noted the debate in 2018, saying "Durham University claims to be the third oldest university in England (a title also claimed by University College London)".

== Defining a university ==
At the time of the foundation of UCL, two arguments raised against it becoming a university and gaining the right to award degrees were that it was not a "congeries of colleges" and that it did not maintain all of the facilities.

This was in keeping with definitions of a university in dictionaries of the time. The idea that a university is made of colleges is stated in Barclay's dictionary (1824), which has "a collection of colleges, where all the liberal arts are taught". and is also seen in Grimsbaw's definition (from 1848): "A college, incorporated for the education of youth, in all the liberal arts, sciences, &c., and empowered to confer degrees. A university generally comprehends many colleges, as is exemplified in those of Oxford and Cambridge, in England."

Similarly, dictionaries of the time sometimes included the idea that universal knowledge was taught. Johnson's Dictionary (1839 edition) had "a school where all the arts and faculties are taught and studied" (or, in the 'miniature' edition of 1820, "a general school of liberal arts"). Other dictionaries followed Johnson in using this definition,

Craig's etymological dictionary from 1849 splits the definition into what was originally meant and what is the modern sense, defining 'university' with: "Originally, any community or corporation; the whole body of students, or of teachers and students assembled, in a place of education, with corporate rights, and under bye-laws of their own—the name was also held to imply that all branches of study were taught in a university: in the modern sense of the term, a university is an establishment for the purposes of instruction in all, or some of the most important divisions of science and literature, and having the power of conferring certain honorary dignities, called degrees; in some old authors, university means the world."

However, reference to the Scottish universities showed that universities did not have to consist of colleges, and the idea that "university" derived from the range of subjects studied was shown to be a false etymology.

The enumeration of universities in the Robbins Report (1963) counted only those formally called universities, referring to the University of London as a "congeries (collection) of university institutions". However, by 1997 the usage of "university" had extended to take in colleges of London (and Wales) in the Dearing Report. This was at least in part due to the decrease of the power of the central University of London and the concomitant rise in status of the colleges, which had gained the right to confer London degrees themselves and direct access to government funding in the early 1990s.

Modern dictionaries often use some combination of study, research and degree-awarding powers. Oxford Dictionaries (2018) had "A high-level educational institution in which students study for degrees and academic research is done", while Collins English Dictionary uses "A university is an institution where students study for degrees and where academic research is done". The Cambridge Advanced Learner's Dictionary does not mention research, with the definition being "a place where people study for an undergraduate (= first) or postgraduate (= higher level) degree". The Oxford English Dictionary has a general definition followed by more specific historical definitions: "An institution of higher education offering tuition in mainly non-vocational subjects and typically having the power to confer degrees. Also: the members, colleges, buildings, etc., of such an institution collectively. ... In the Middle Ages: a body of teachers and students engaged in giving and receiving instruction in the higher branches of study (cf. trivium, quadrivium) and regarded as a scholastic guild or corporation; an organized body of schools. ... Later: an institution offering degree courses and research facilities, typically providing some accommodation and other amenities for its students."

=== Legal definition ===
The first time a court was asked to answer the question "what is a university?" was in St David's College, Lampeter v Ministry of Education (1951) in the Chancery Division. The traditional definition, used by the Ministry of Education at the time and referenced by Mr Justice Vaisey in his judgement was that institutions were considered to be universities "if they had explicitly asserted that status in their founding charters, or had been granted the title by appropriate authority".

Vaisey's judgement considered six criteria put forward by the college, drawn from the medieval definition of a studium generale. These have been summarised as:

1. A charter conferred by the crown or a comparable high authority (the pope in years past or in other jurisdictions);

2. That access was open to all regardless of creed (true since 1896, if not earlier);

3. That there existed there a community of scholars;

4. At least one of the higher faculties were present (such as theology, law, philosophy and medicine);

5. Buildings and residence for students;

6. The power to award degrees.

The power to award degrees, referred to as "the obvious and most essential quality" by Vaisey, was where the college failed, due to its limited degree-awarding powers that meant it was not a "university properly so called".

This common-law definition of a university was replaced by a statutory definition under the Further and Higher Education Act 1992: that a university is an institution that has been granted the right by the government to use the title of university.

When the Higher Education and Research Act 2017 was proceeding through Parliament, the House of Lords passed an amendment adding a definition of a university to the bill. However, this was later removed by the House of Commons during the Parliamentary ping-pong. As a result, the bill was passed without a definition of a university being established.

== Academic studies ==
History books about particular institutions and aimed at the general public have generally supported the claim of the institution backing them. However, other studies have also touched upon the question. The European University Association's four-volume series, A History of the University in Europe, uses the definition for universities (in the period 1800–1945) of "institutions of higher education founded or recognized as universities by the public authorities of their territory and authorized to confer academic degrees in more than one discipline". This work lists Durham as the third oldest university in England (from 1832) with London as the fourth oldest (from 1836) and UCL and King's only as colleges of London.

Historian William Whyte similarly states: "Thus it was that the first new university for almost 250 years was founded—and funded—by the amply endowed Bishop of Durham. Durham University was established by Act of Parliament in 1832 and granted a Royal Charter five years later in 1837", and the Handbook of Comparative Higher Education Law says "In the 1830s the creation of the Universities of Durham (1832) and London (1836) finally ended the Oxbridge monopoly". The historian and politician Sir John Marriott also named Durham as the third university, saying "A third University had been established at Durham in 1832, and four years later London University came into being, but only as an examining body, until in 1900 it was endowed with the full status of a teaching University with a number of constituent colleges." Other historians generally concur, with some stating that "using the date of the incorporating Act of Parliament or Royal Charter as the founding date" is "accepted practice" in naming Durham as third.

However, the consensus on Durham is not absolute. The International Dictionary of University Histories acknowledges the existence of the debate in its essay on Durham, stating that: "Durham is often referred to as England's third university, after Oxford and Cambridge. Yet it is also often referred to as England's fourth, on the assumption that London preceded it, for University College London had been opened in 1828. The difficulty can only be resolved according to one's definition of what a university is. Those who define a university as an institution which teaches advanced courses favor London over Durham. Those who emphasize the power to award degrees do the same, since the University of London, which absorbed the College in 1836, was granted that power the same year, while Durham received its a year later. But those who prefer the British legal definition give Durham priority, since it received a royal charter four years before London did and, in any event, a college is not the same as a university." Yet the essay on London in the same volume, by the same author, states unequivocally: "Thus the federal university was created as the fourth university in England, just four years after the University of Durham had been founded as the third." Some historians acknowledge that UCL was founded to be a university before becoming a college of the University of London. Some historians also disagree with the assertion that London gained its degree awarding powers before Durham, and others have noted that there was uncertainty at the time as to whether or not Durham had degree awarding powers stemming from its founding Act of Parliament, which was cleared up by it obtaining a royal charter.

== See also ==
- List of UK universities by date of foundation
- List of oldest universities in continuous operation
- Ancient university
- Medieval university
