= Battle of Northampton =

Battle of Northampton may refer to:

- Battle of Northampton (1264)
- Battle of Northampton (1460)
