= William Wheatley (disambiguation) =

William Wheatley (1816–1876) was an American stage actor.

William Wheatley may also refer to:

- William of Wheatley (fl. 1310), English divine, schoolmaster and author
- William O. Wheatley Jr. (born c. 1944), American television producer and executive
