= University of Stamford =

University in Lincolnshire, 1333 to 1335

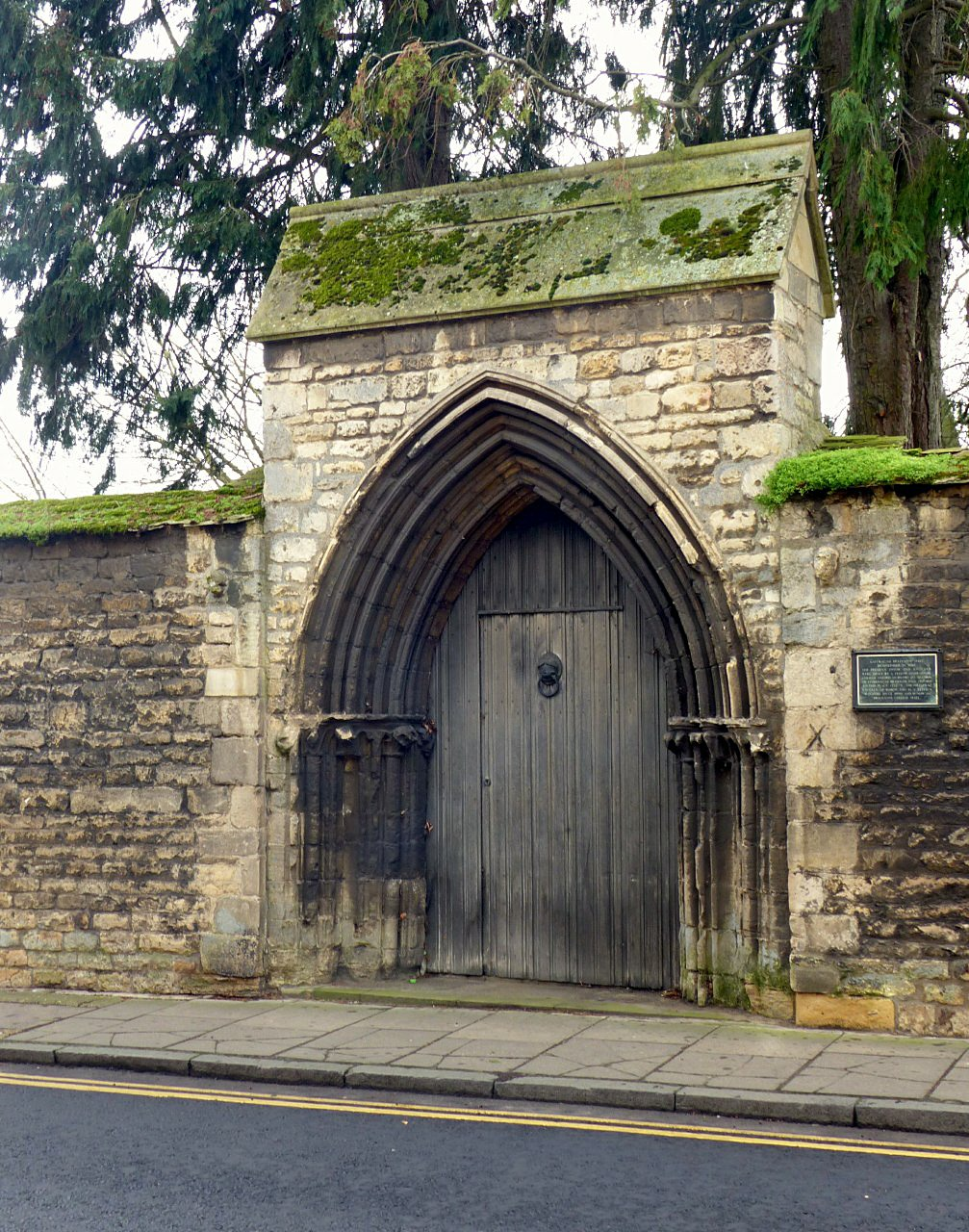
- Gate believed to have been the entrance to Brazenose Hall, Stamford, with a replica brass knocker replacing c.12th-century original taken to Brasenose College, Oxford
- Active: 1333–1335
- Founders: William de Barnby and other masters and scholars of Oxford
- Academic staff: 24 (1335)
- Students: 15 (1335)
- Location: Stamford, Lincolnshire, England; 52.654046°N 0.473215°W
- Campus: University town

The University of Stamford was an academic institution founded in 1333 in Stamford, Lincolnshire, by a group of students and tutors from the University of Oxford, including Merton College and Brasenose Hall.

After lobbying by the University of Oxford, King Edward III suppressed the institution in 1335 and the tutors and scholars were returned to Oxford. All Oxford graduates until the 1820s were required to take a specific oath not to lecture in Stamford, along with oaths for graduates at both Oxford and the University of Cambridge not to recognise any further English universities.

== History ==
=== Legendary precursor ===
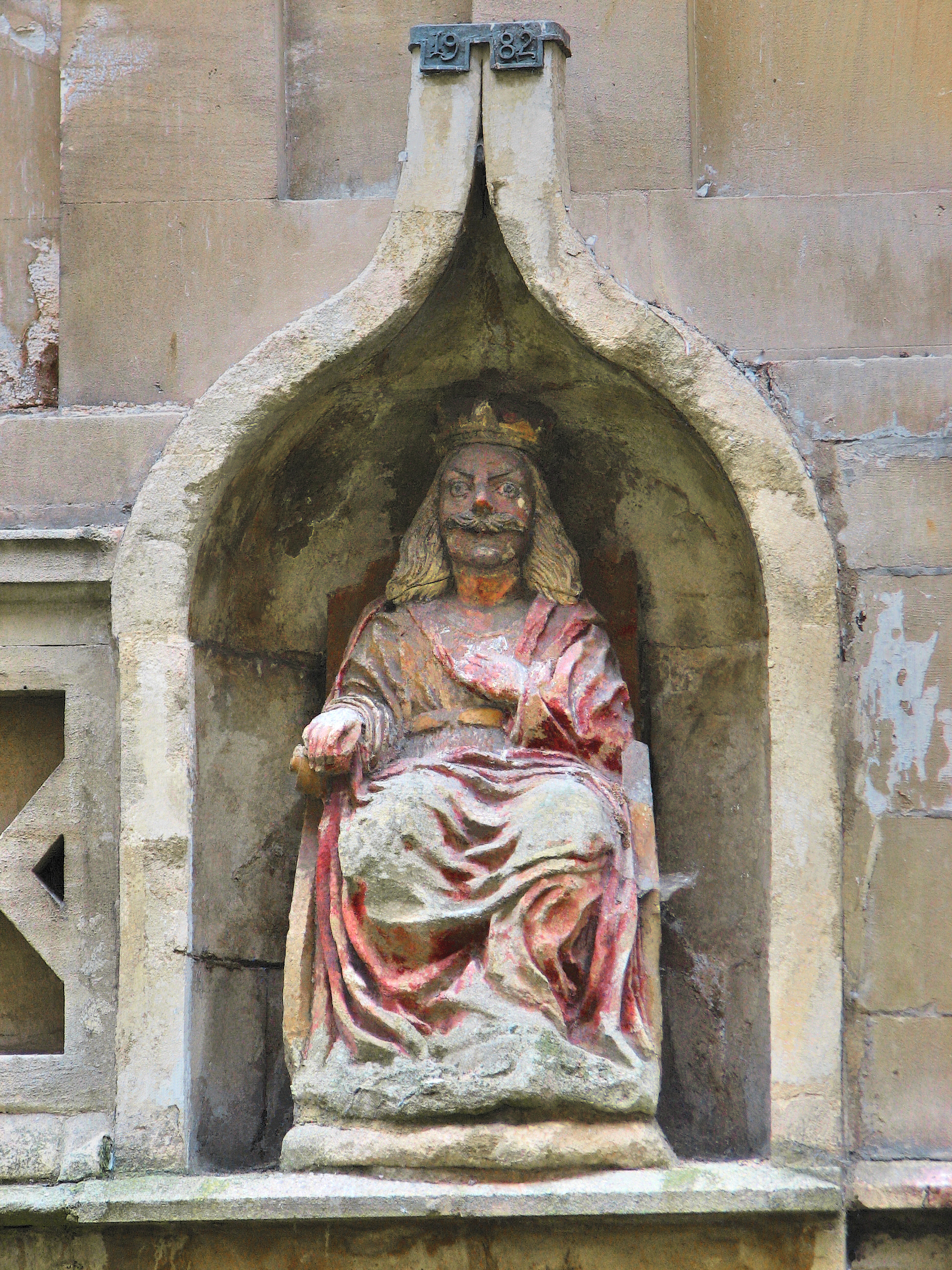
Bladud statue at the King's Bath, Bath

According to John Hardyng, writing in the 1440s, the legendary British king Bladud studied in Athens before founding a university in Stamford. Later writers give possible dates of foundation in 863 BC, and dissolution by Augustine of Canterbury in AD 605.

The legend is reflected in Edmund Spenser's 1590 poem The Faerie Queene in which he writes:

And shall see Stamford, tho’ now homely hid,
Then shine in learning more than ever did
Cambridge or Oxford, England’s goodly beams.

— Edmund Spenser, The Faerie Queene

However, no other evidence has been found of the existence of this institution.

=== Previous teaching in Stamford ===
In 1301, Edward I granted to the Gilbertines a manor on the north side of St Peter's Street, which they called Sempringham Hall. In 1303 John Dalderby, Bishop of Lincoln, gave them licence to maintain at this hall "scholars ... studying the scriptures and philosophy".

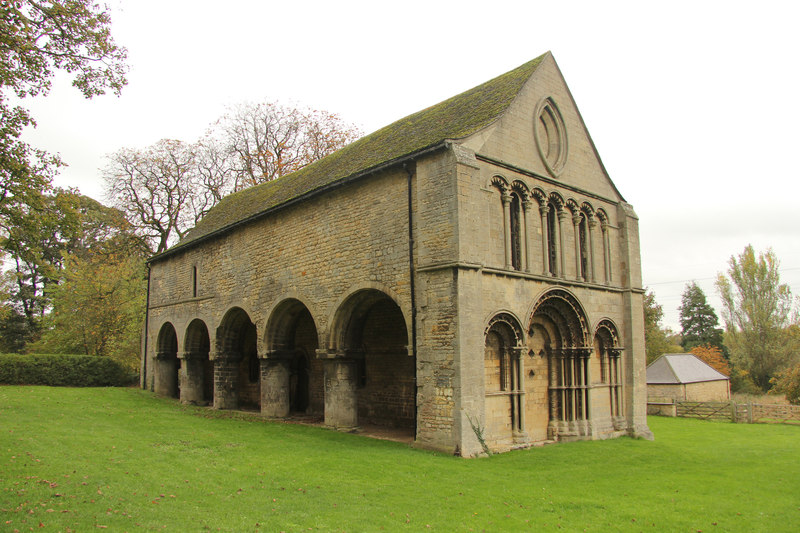
St Leonard's Priory

There is also inconclusive evidence that there may have been teaching at the Benedictine Priory of St Leonard, a cell of Durham Priory. The mother house also maintained Durham College, Oxford, and a few records survive recording payments from Durham, and from Monkwearmouth–Jarrow Abbey, to "scholars at Oxford and Stamford" - although in some cases these were then amended to remove mention of scholars at Stamford. There were also houses belonging to the Carmelite, Dominican and Franciscan orders of friars in the town. A manuscript of a commentary by William of Wheatley also records that he taught in Stamford in 1309, but this could refer to teaching in a grammar school.

Francis Peck and Hensley Henson have argued that the combined strength of these religious institutions constituted "a university in all but name"; however, Hastings Rashdall considered this conclusion "essentially misleading".

=== Exodus from Oxford ===
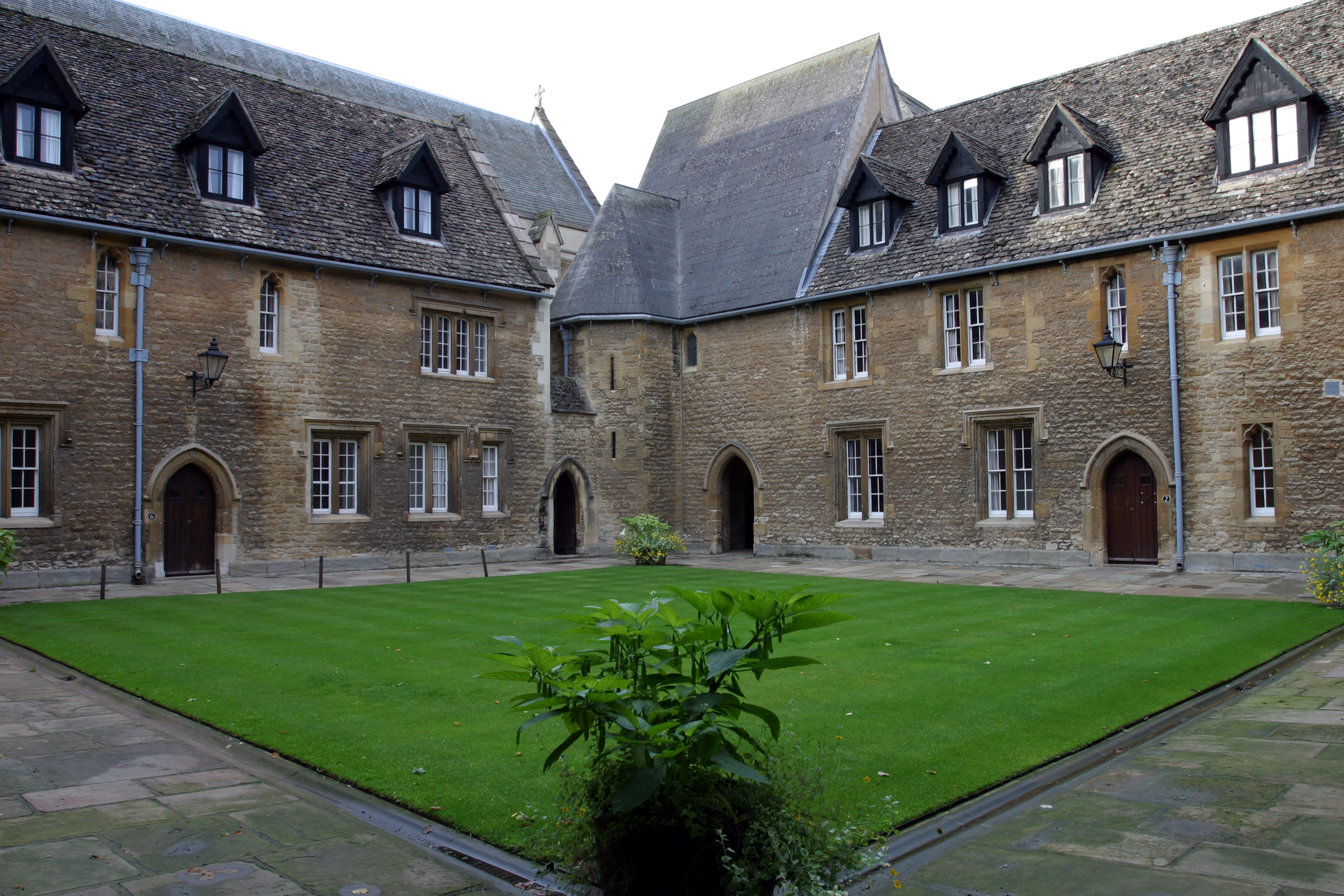
Early 14th-century buildings in Mob Quad, Merton College, Oxford

In 1333, there was discord in Oxford, which seems to have been the result of conflict between students from Northern and Southern England. Following this, a group of students and tutors left Oxford in 1333 to found a rival college at Stamford. They were joined by more in 1334.

Surviving records suggest that the masters were all or nearly all from Northern England. Their leader was William de Barnby, a Yorkshireman who had been fellow and bursar of Merton College.

=== Establishment in Stamford ===
Oxford antiquary Anthony Wood, writing in the 17th century, identified six places in Stamford which were said locally to have been academic colleges or halls:

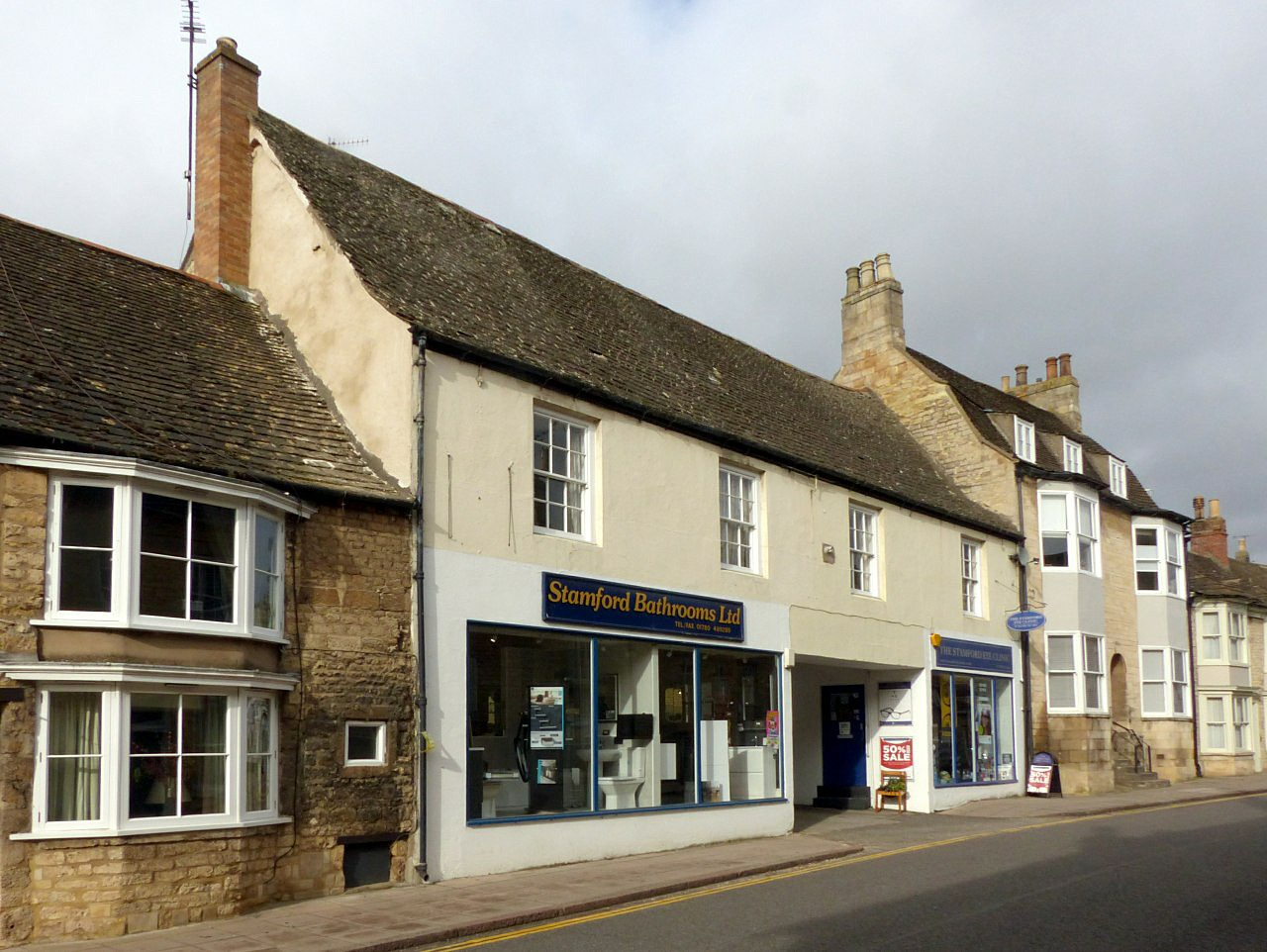
Later medieval buildings on the site of Sempringham Hall, St Peter's Street

- Sempringham Hall on St Peter's Street, the hall of studies of the Gilbertines, "the oldest and chiefest"
- Black Hall, built against All Saints' Church, and seeming to be "a place for the reception of Religious persons"
- The Old Swan on St Mary's street, thought to have been a college or hall for scholars
- Brazenose Hall in St Paul's parish, with "a great gate and a wicket" bearing an old brass knocker, and "a fair Refectory within"
- A house in St George's parish, adjoining the parsonage, said to have been an ancient college for which no name is recorded
- A street near St George's church, where one whole side consists of "such ancient buildings as our decayed Halls in Oxford have been"

=== Efforts at suppression ===
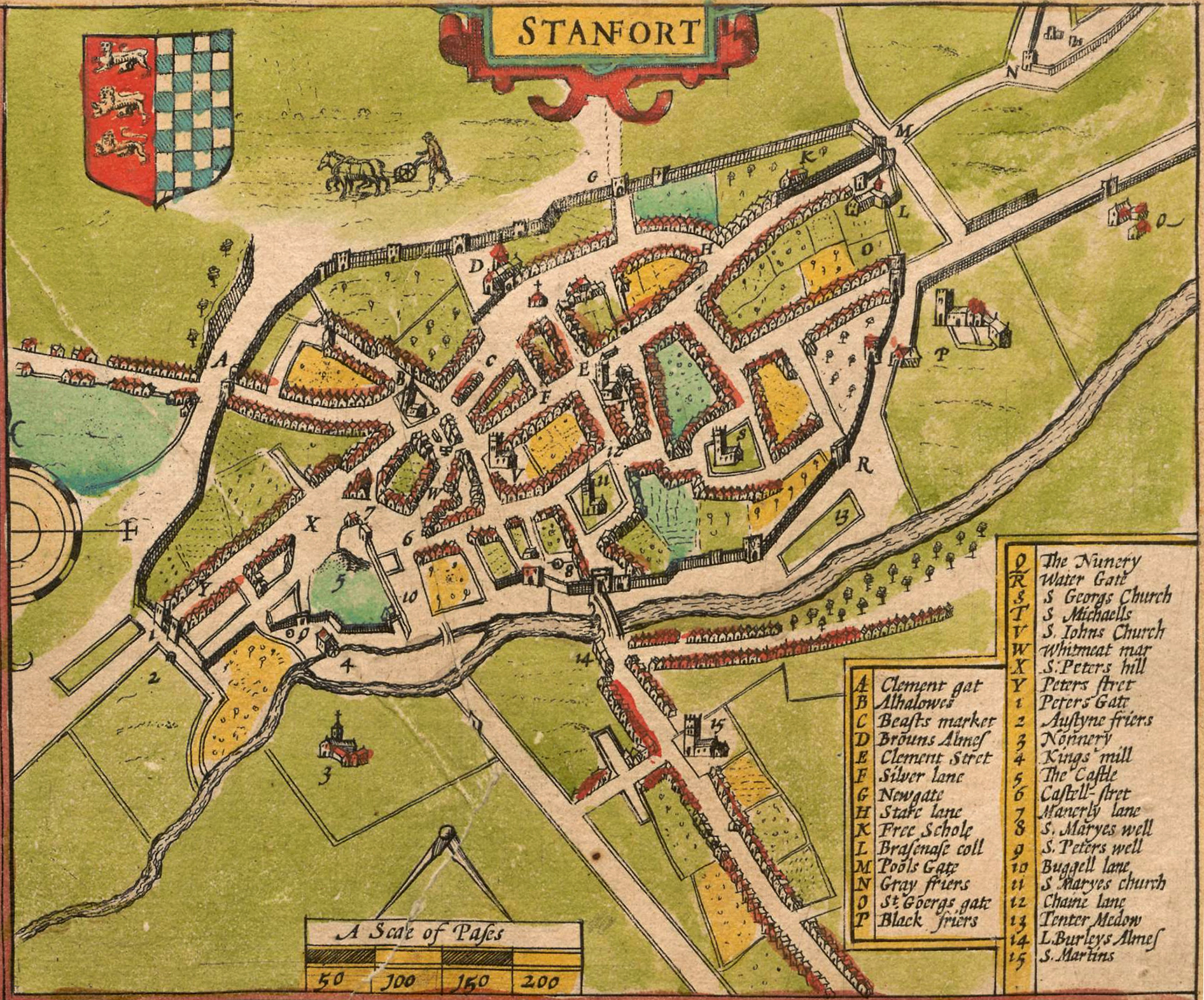
1611 map by John Speed, showing the original Brazenose College building in the top right (marked 'L' - 'Brasenase Coll' in key)

Oxford University petitioned Queen Philippa for help on 14 February 1334 [O.S. 14 February 1333], appealing that she and the king "let not the town of Oxford... be disinherited by the honour of another". Around the same time, similar petitions went to the Bishop of Lincoln and to King Edward III, referring to the "evil, which we think every way hurtful and pestilential, namely, the new assembly of scholars at the town of Stamford for university instructions", and appealing that "what was begun by improvident rashness may be quickly put an end to by the royal wisdom, and be a warning to future evil-doers".

On 2 August 1334, the king ordered the Sheriff of Lincolnshire, John of Trehampton, to go to Stamford and inhibit everyone, on pain of forfeiture of all their property, from performing any scholastic acts there. A similar message was also sent to the Mayor of Oxford. However, on 1 November, he was required to write again, saying he understood that masters and scholars continued in scholastic acts in Stamford. On 7 January 1335, after apparent inaction, the king wrote to the sheriff to say he had appointed his own secretary, William Trussell, to go with the sheriff and seize the goods of any disobedient clerks.

In an undated letter, "the clerks living in the town of Stamford" informed the king that they had travelled to Stamford "by reason of many controversies, contests and fights ... in Oxford", and studied there "in greater quiet and peace by sufferance of the noble John earl of Warenne". They appealed that "the king would allow his liegemen to remain there under his protection". A copy of this letter survived in the register of the Abbot of Peterborough, suggesting he may have had a role in supporting the rebels.

On 29 March 1335, the King issued a commission to Trussell to go to Stamford to suppress the students there, with an additional command to the sheriff to assist him. A number of students were expelled from Stamford, but Anthony Wood records that, after Trussell departed, the students were encouraged by the inhabitants of Stamford to return.

On 26 July 1335, an inquisition took place at Stamford before Trussell, which was able to name 38 clerks still in Stamford. The list includes seventeen Masters of Arts including William of Barnby; a Bachelor of Arts; five local parish priests; fifteen students (including the rector of Stanhope, County Durham); and "Philipus le maunciple atte Brasenose".

=== Legacy ===
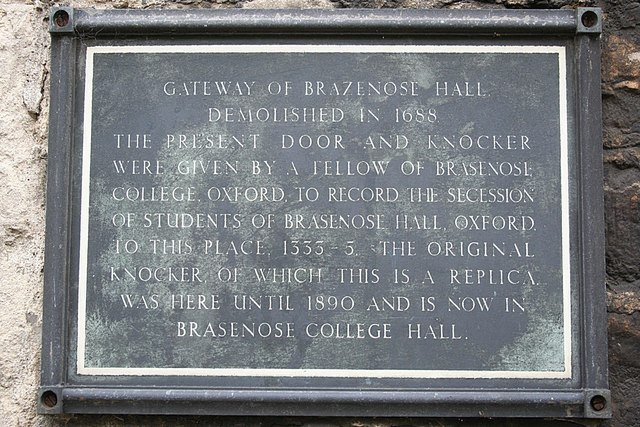
Plaque by Brazenose gate commemorating its history

Robert de Stratford, chancellor of both England and Oxford University, wrote to the masters of Cambridge University around 1337 regarding William of Barnby, whom he identified as "the principal instigator of the dangerous schism", and warning them not to grant degrees to him, saying that "if the said university of Stamford had lasted, it would have been to the disadvantage and dishonour of both universities".

Master of Arts students at Oxford were obliged to take an oath, which remained in place until 1827:

Jurabis etiam, quod in ista facultate alibi in Anglia quam hic et Cantabrigiæ, Lectiones tuas solemniter, tanquam in Universitate non resumes; nec in aliqua Facultate, sicut in Universitate, solemniter incipies: nec consenties ut aliquis alibi in Anglia incipiens hich pro magistro habeatur. Item tu jurabis quod non leges nec audies Stamfordiae, tanquam in Universitate, Studio, aut Collegia Generali.

[You shall swear that you will not in this faculty resume any solemn lectures as in a university in any place in England, except here or at Cambridge; that you will not solemnly commence in any faculty as in a university; and that you will not consent that anyone commencing elsewhere in England shall be regarded as a master. You shall also swear that you will not read nor hear at Stamford as in a university, or general college and place of study]

— Laudian Code, title 9, section vi

The 'Stamford oath' (along with a similar, shorter oath at Cambridge) was used to maintain the long duopoly of Oxford and Cambridge.

The antiquary Francis Peck in 1727 published annals of Stamford called Academia Tertia Anglicana (Latin for 'the third English university').

== Brazenose Hall ==
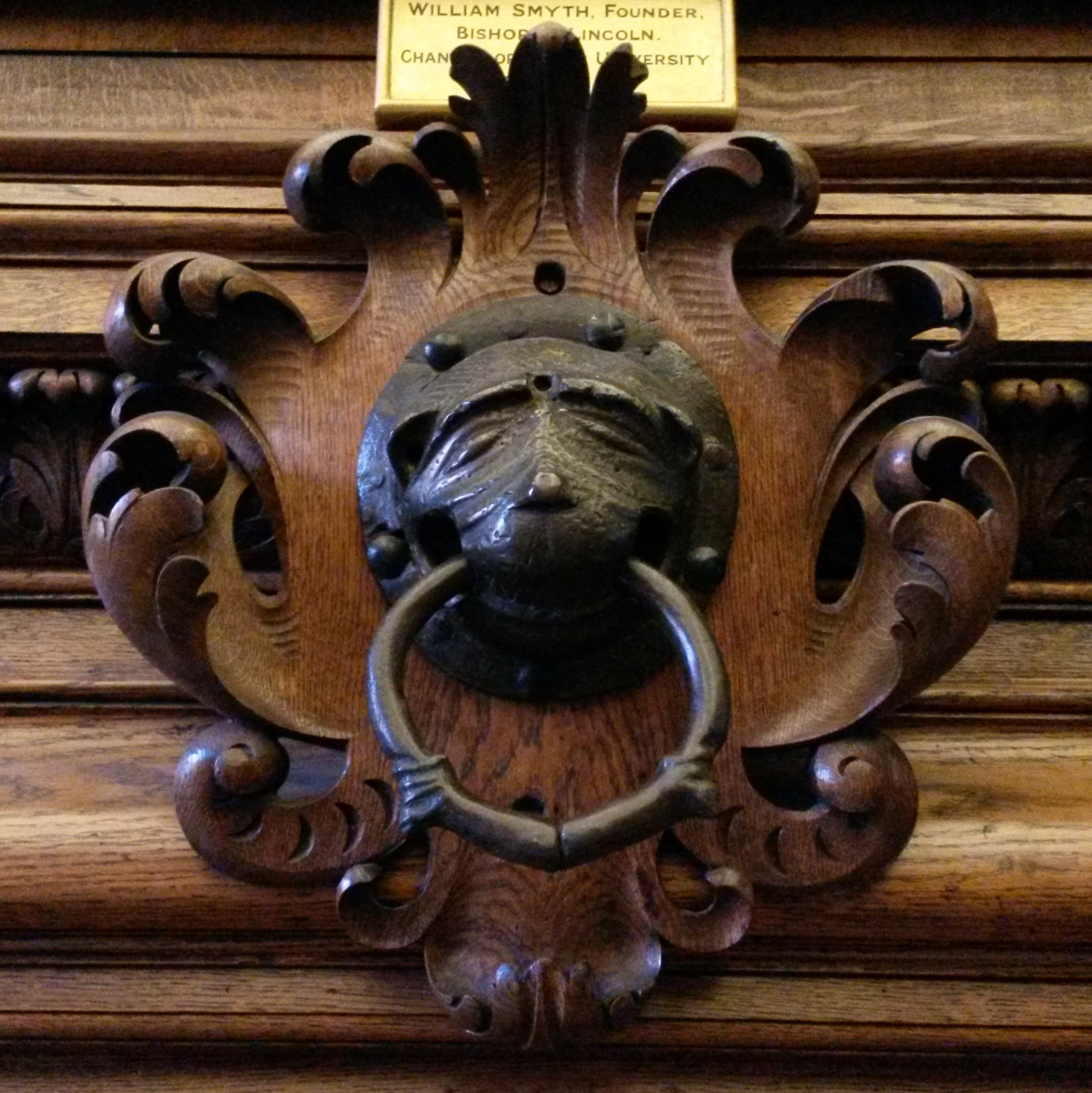
The original door knocker, now in the dining hall of Brasenose College, Oxford

The only name on the list of scholars at the inquisition in 1335 given further description is "Philippus le manciple atte Brasenose". Arthur Francis Leach and Falconer Madan take this to mean that a Brasenose Hall existed in Stamford as part of the nascent university; presumably formed by scholars from Brasenose Hall, Oxford, whose site would later become Brasenose College, Oxford.

Leach identifies this hall with a building known as Brazenose Hall (Note: While the Oxford college has settled on the spelling 'Brasenose', Stamford uses the form 'Brazenose'.) or "The College", on St Paul's Street, Stamford; though there is no other evidence of use of this name before 1559, when a lease mentions "a messuage called Brassen Nose in St. Paul’s [parish], with all houses, barns, stables and other buildings". Oxford antiquary Anthony Wood, writing in the 17th century, recorded that the building carried the name of Brasenose or Brasen nose, and had 'a fair refectory therein' and 'a great gate and a wicket; upon which wicket is a face or head of old cast brass with a ring through the nose thereof'.

This medieval building, having fallen into disrepair, was demolished in 1688, leaving a gate identified as dating from the early 14th century and bearing an ancient brass knocker. Materials from the old building were used to construct a house on the site known as Brazenose Hall, or The College, which became the town workhouse before being demolished in 1822. The site, including the gate, then became the garden of the adjoining early 18th-century house, which took on the name "Brazenose House".

In 1890, Brasenose College, Oxford purchased the house in order to obtain the knocker, which was suggested to be the original Oxford 'brazen nose', removed to Stamford by 14th century Brasenose Hall scholars when they joined the University of Stamford. The knocker, which was assessed as dating from the 12th century, was removed from the gate and is now mounted above the high table in the college's dining hall in Oxford; a replica was placed on the gateway in Stamford in 1961.

The site, including the 18th-century house, was leased by the Oxford college to the private Brazenose School for Girls, then in 1929 was purchased by Stamford School and became part of the school site, giving its name to one of the school's senior houses. The "Site of Brazenose College" is a scheduled monument and the gate and retaining walls of the college are Grade I listed.

== See also ==
- Medieval university
- List of medieval universities
- University of Northampton (13th century)
- Third-oldest university in England debate
