= Francis Peck =

English priest and antiquary (1692–1743)

Francis Peck (1692–1743) was an English priest of the Church of England and antiquary, best known for his Desiderata Curiosa (1732–1735).

== Life ==
He was born in Stamford, Lincolnshire, England, the son of Robert, merchant, and baptised 4 May 1692. He may have attended Stamford School before attending Charterhouse School, from where he was admitted to St John's College, Cambridge in 1709. Some have confused him with another Francis Peck, who was admitted to Trinity College, Cambridge in 1706.

He was ordained as priest, 27 May 1716. After a curacy at King's Cliffe, Northamptonshire, he served as Rector of Goadby Marwood, Leicestershire, from 1723 until his death. He became a prebend of Lincoln in 1738.

He wrote several books on history. In 1727 he published a history of Stamford called Academia Tertia Anglicana (Latin for 'the third English university' - a reference to the short-lived 14th-century institution in the town). He was elected to the Society of Antiquarians in 1732 and corresponded with many of the leading antiquaries and historians of the age; including Thomas Hearne, Browne Willis, Roger and Samuel Gale, and William Stukeley.

== Desiderata Curiosa ==
His major publication is the Desiderata Curiosa, a two-volume miscellany (published 1732–1735). There is an engraved frontispiece portrait of Peck (by R. Collins, from life) in volume I, and nine other plates, as well as integral engravings in the text; Stukeley presented the plate of the memorial of Henry Wykes, vicar of All Saints' Church, Stamford (1479-1508). The work contains a major biography of Sir William Cecil, Lord Burghley, Queen Elizabeth I's Lord High Treasurer and chief advisor for much of her reign.

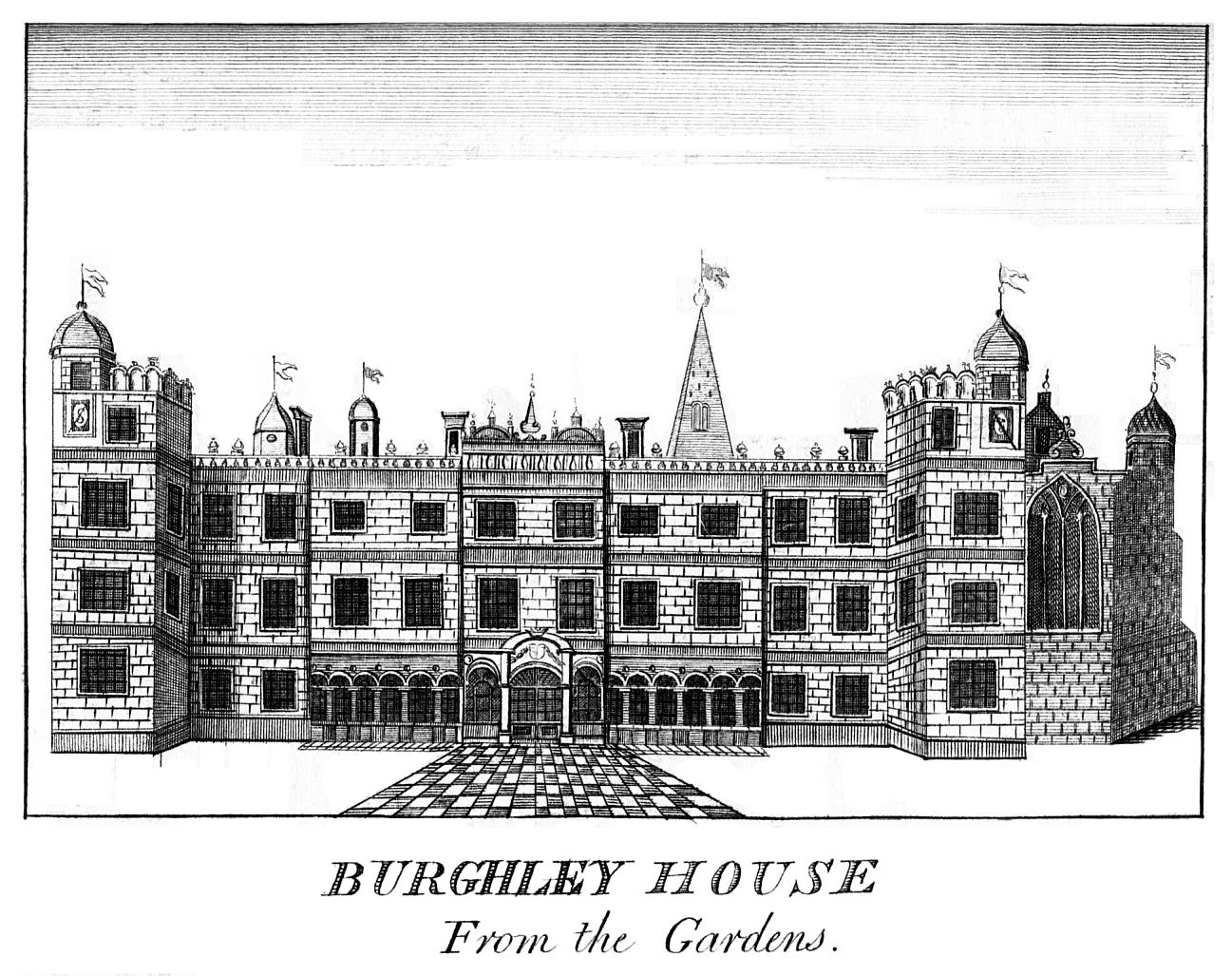
Burghley House, one of the seats of Lord Burghley, from Peck's Desiderata Curiosa.

Peck, Francis, Desiderata Curiosa. "Volume the First. Containing, I. The complete Statesman, exemplified in the Life and Action of Sir William Cecil, Lord Burghley, Lord High Treasurer of England in Queen Elizabeth’s Time; largely setting forth both his public and private Conduct. With many Notes from his own MS. Diary, and other Authors [together with 29 other tracts named on the title-pages and] many other Memoirs, Letters, Wills, and Epitaphs; amounting in all to above 150 curious Articles; all now published from original MSS. communicated by eminent Persons … Adorned with Cuts. London: Printed 1732"

Volume the Second, printed 1735, contains a further 150 "curious Articles".

Some copies of the first edition have a cancel title page for Volume I (as called for in the "Directions to the Binder" in Volume II). The cancelland is sometimes retained as the "general title-page".
