= University of Northampton (13th century) =

Former university in Northampton, England

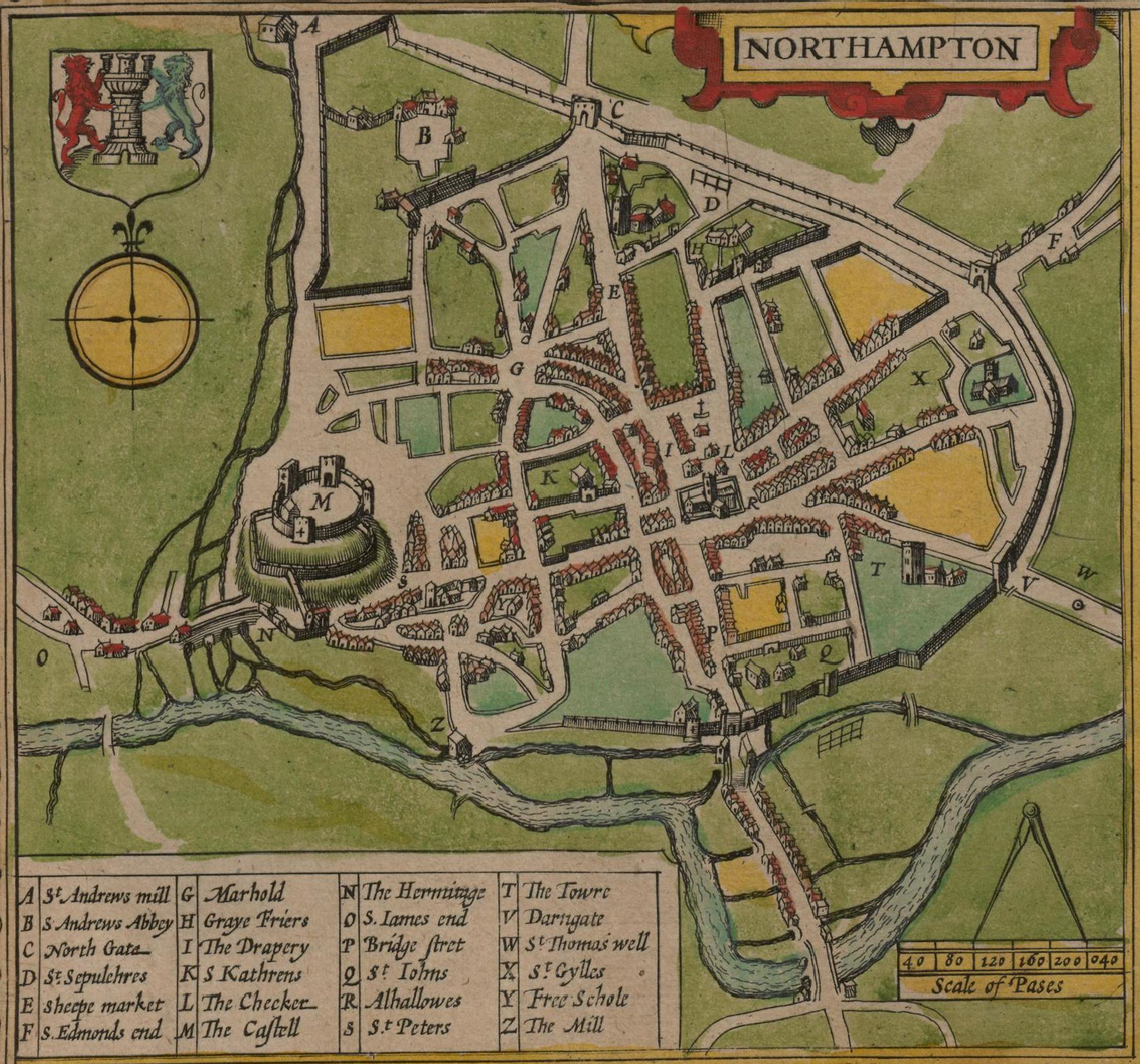
- Map of medieval Northampton; this is John Speed's map from 1610, but the layout of the city was largely the same in the 13th century.
- Latin: Universitas Northamptoniae
- Type: Medieval university
- Active: 1261–1265
- Location: Northampton, Northamptonshire, England
- Campus: University town

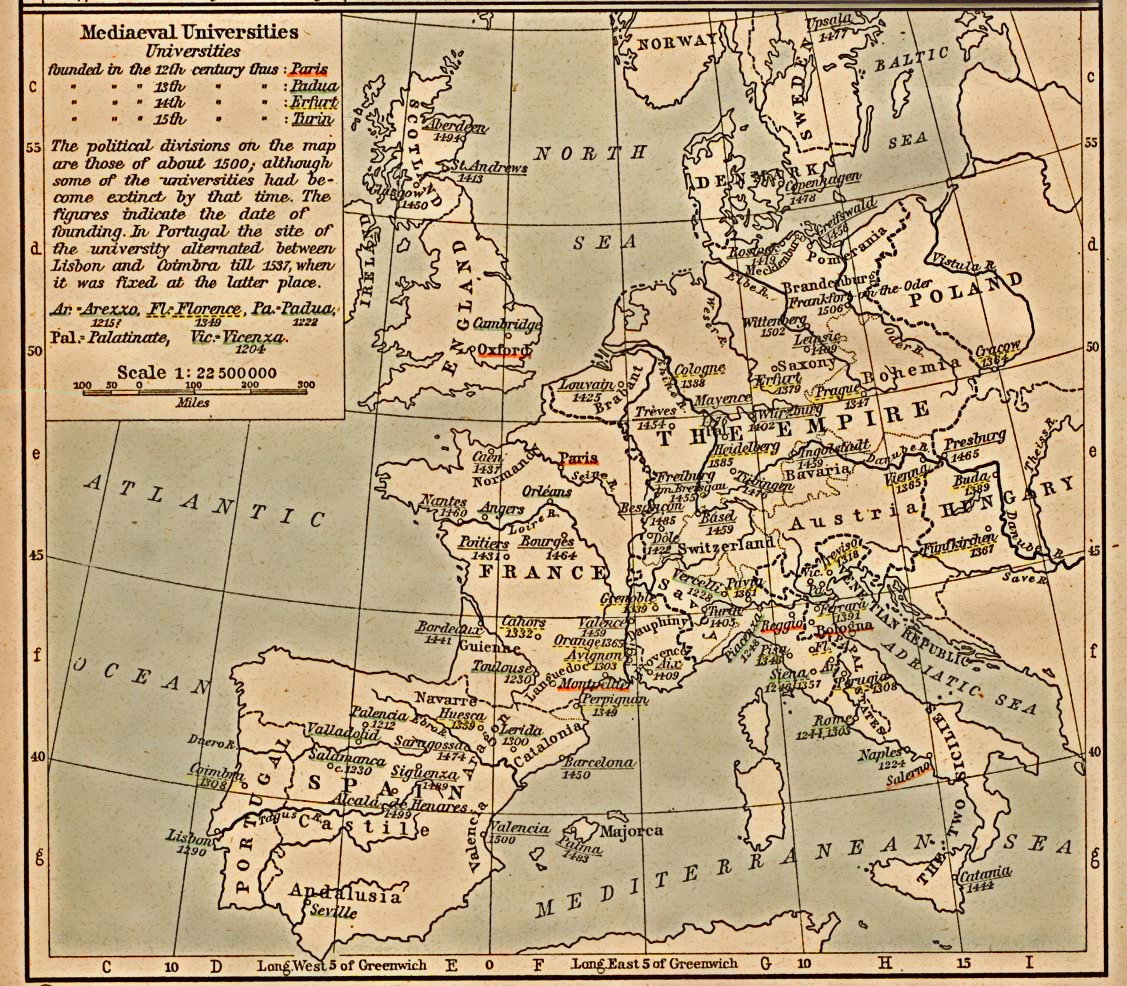
Map of medieval universities

The University of Northampton was based in Northampton, England, from 1261 to 1265.

The university was established by royal charter after approval from King Henry III in 1261. It was the third university in England, after Oxford and Cambridge, and the 22nd in Europe. After being advised by bishops and magnates that Northampton was a threat to Oxford, Henry III dissolved the university in 1265, and issued a royal decree forbidding any future establishment of a university in Northampton.

In 2005 the decree was repealed by the Privy Council, allowing the then University College Northampton (founded in 1924) to gain university status and become the University of Northampton.

== History ==
=== Founding ===
Northampton was, in the 13th century, a far more important town than is evident today, so it is not particularly surprising that a university was established there. The town was also, briefly, the King's seat.

This first University of Northampton had its antecedents in a school founded in the reign of King Richard I. Richard patronised the institution and, according to at least one historian, between 1176 and 1193 the school at Northampton "rivalled or even eclipsed the Oxford schools".

Philosopher Daniel of Morley wrote around that time:

How disappointed I was when I was told that even here [in England] the liberal arts were mute and Aristotle and Plato were forgotten in favour of Smith versus Jones. But then I heard that such studies were flourishing in Northampton, and, not wanting to be the only Greek among Romans, I set out for that town.

— Daniel of Morley (c.1140 – c.1210), Philosophia, cited by Charles Burnett

Grammarian Geoffrey of Vinsauf and legal authority Roger Vacarius both based themselves in Northampton. There was also a strong local Jewish academic community.

The school lost a powerful supporter with the death of King Richard. In the 13th century, during the reign of King John and his son Henry III, the nascent university gained the patronage of Simon de Montfort.

In 1261, with the approval of Henry III, a University of Northampton was granted a royal charter.

=== Abolition ===
The existence of this first University of Northampton was brief. In 1265, only four years after its foundation, Henry III revoked the town's licence to have a university.

One factor in this may have been the part adopted by scholars in opposing the King's forces during the Siege of Northampton in April 1264, when Henry III's forces besieged the supporters of Simon de Montfort, patron of the university, in Northampton Castle.

Sources from the time suggest that hostility of the University of Oxford was also a significant factor. Henry wrote to the mayors and burgesses of Northampton on 1 February 1265, saying:

We, believing at the time that town would be benefited by this, and that no small benefit would accrue to us therefrom, assented at their request [to establish a university in 1261]. But now as we are truly informed by the statements of many trustworthy persons that our borough of Oxford, which is of ancient foundation, and was confirmed by our ancestors kings of England, and is commonly commended for its advantage to students, would suffer no little damage from such University, if it remained there, which we by no means wish, and especially as it appears to all the bishops of our realm, as we learn from their letters patent, that it would be for the honour of God, and the benefit of the Church of England, and the advancement of students that the University should be removed from the town aforesaid; we by the advice of our great men, firmly order that there shall henceforth be no University in our said town, and that you shall not allow any students to remain there otherwise than was customary before the creation of the said University.

=== Modern University of Northampton ===
The university's name was revived in 2005 when the then University College Northampton, itself an amalgam of earlier institutions, was upgraded to full university status and renamed the University of Northampton. Other than the name and the location in the town, there is no link between the medieval university and the modern university.

== See also ==
- Medieval university
- List of medieval universities
- University of Stamford
- Third-oldest university in England debate
- Medieval University of Dublin
