= Northampton Castle =

Norman castle in England

- Northampton, England
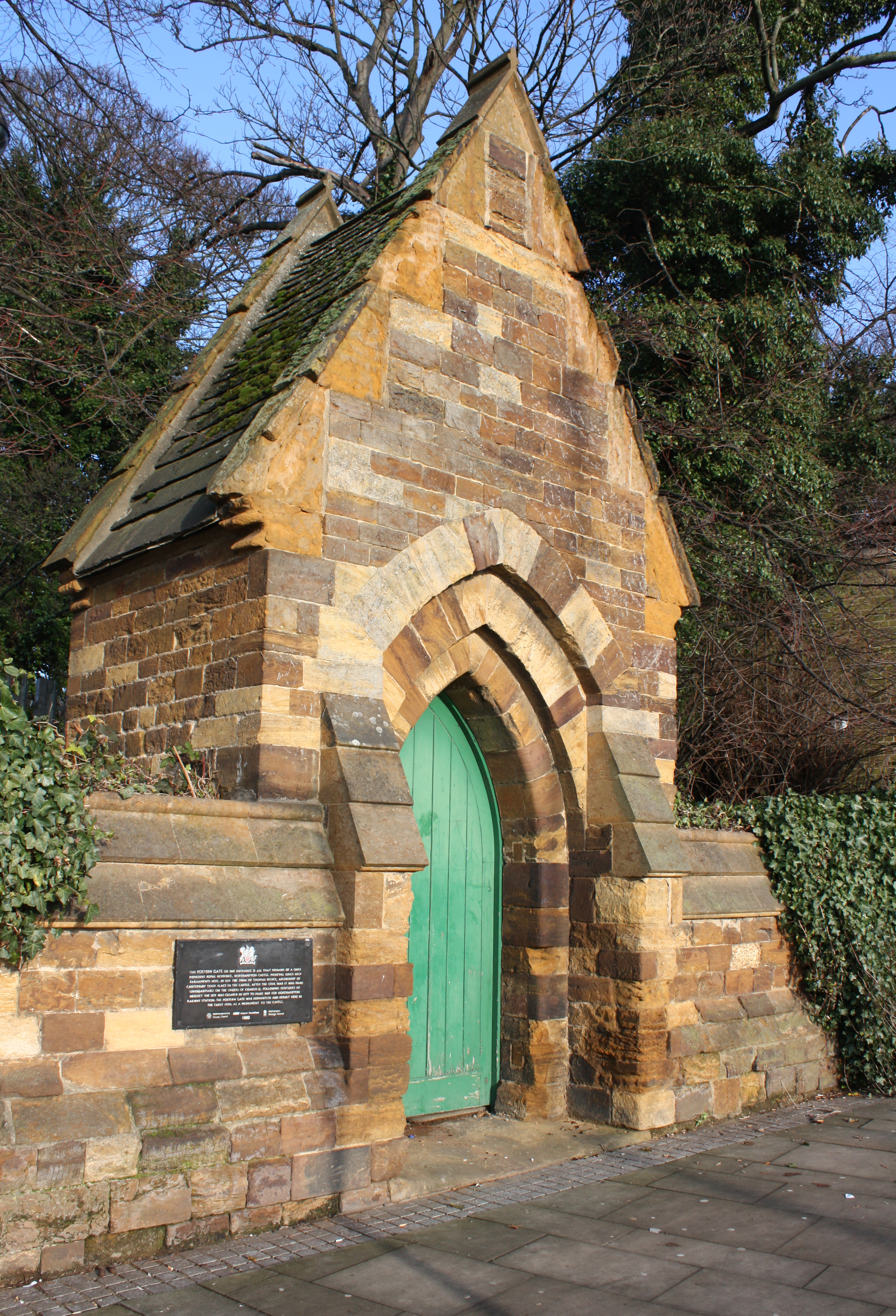
- All that remains of Northampton Castle: a postern that was dismantled from its original position and rebuilt into the wall of Northampton railway station

Site information
- Type: Motte-and-bailey castle
- Condition: Destroyed

Location
- Location in the East Midlands of England
- Coordinates: 52.237°N 0.905°W

Site history
- Built: 1084
- Built by: Simon de Senlis

Northampton Castle was one of the most prominent Norman castles in England. The castle site in Northampton was outside the western city gate, and defended on three sides by deep trenches. A branch of the River Nene provided a natural barrier on the western side. The castle had extensive grounds and a large keep. The gates were surrounded by bulwarks made of earth, used to mount artillery. The castle was "obliterated" by the arrival of a railway branch of what is now the West Coast Main Line in the 19th century, the station of which was built on the castle site and the construction of the original Northampton Castle railway station. All that remains of the castle today is the Postern Gate, near Northampton Railway Station.

== History ==
=== Early period ===
The castle was built under the stewardship of Simon de Senlis, the first Earl of Northampton, in 1084. It took several years to complete, as there is no mention of it in the Domesday Book, the great survey of England completed in 1086. In the reign of Henry II, the castle was in the hands of the Crown. In the First Barons' War between King John and his barons, the latter used it as a stronghold. When the King prevailed, the castle was entrusted to Falkes de Breauté, whom the King admired for his courage during the war.

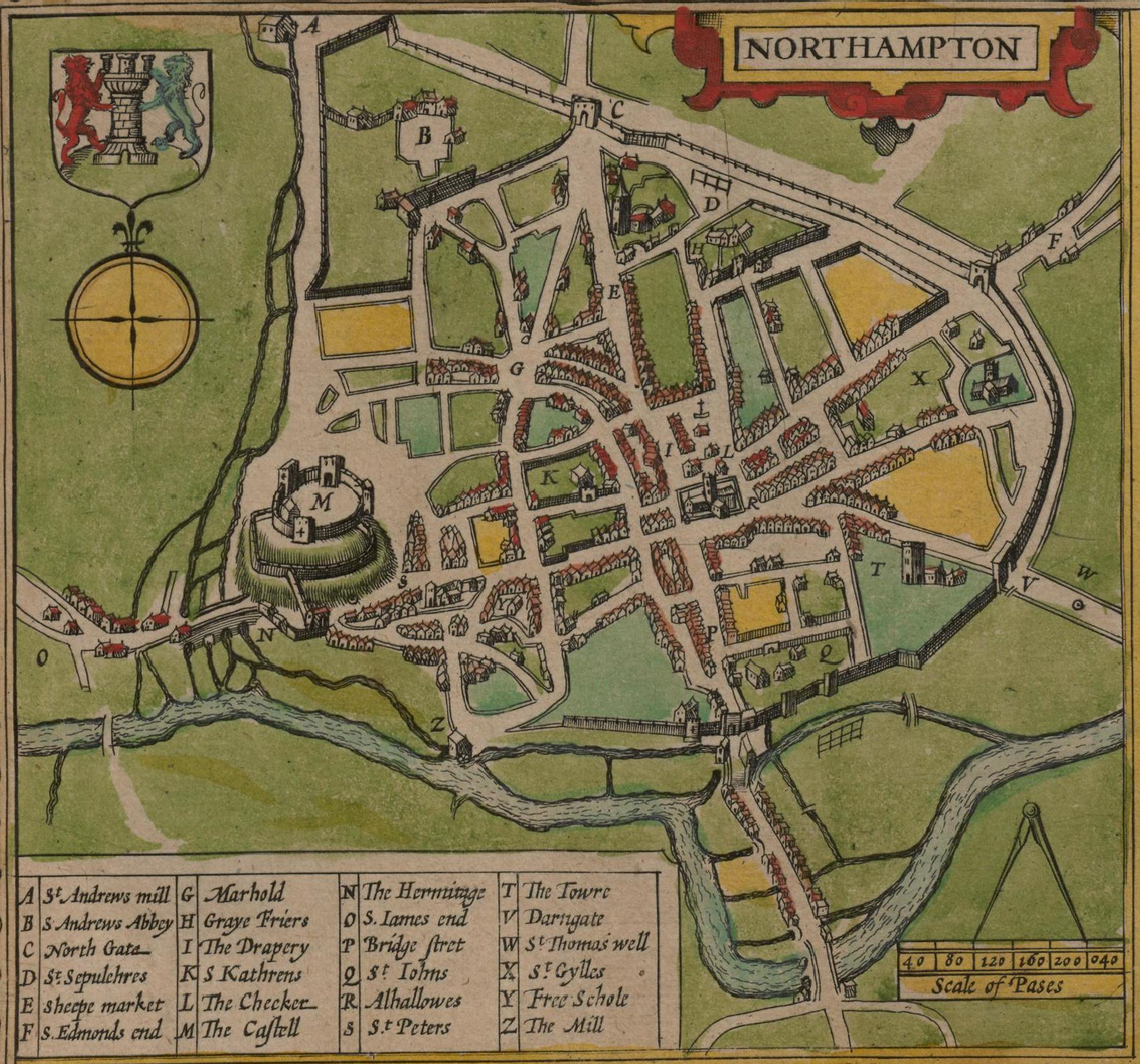
Map of Northampton by John Speed from 1610, showing the location of the castle at left (west)

In 1164, Thomas Becket was tried at the castle before a great council. Having escaped by dressing as a monk, Becket then fled to France. In May 1215, rebel barons who had renounced fealty to King John unsuccessfully besieged Northampton Castle.

In 1264, in the Second Barons' War between King Henry III and his nobles, the castle was owned by the confederate barons and governed by Simon de Montfort. When the King defeated the garrison at the Battle of Northampton in 1264, the castle again reverted to the Crown. It remained so until three years into King Edward III's reign, when Thomas Wake, who was then sheriff of Blisworth, claimed it belonged to the county under his jurisdiction.

In 1452, thirty years into King Henry VI's reign, the castle was rented to Robert Caldecote for 20 years, at the annual rate of £5. The rent of the castle included:

... all the wifes belonging to the constableship of [the castle], and the herbage within the walls, and in the trenches, as also a certain meadow, and right of fishing in the river ...

=== Later history ===
During the English Civil War, the castle was used by the Parliamentarians. In 1662, in revenge for this, King Charles II ordered that the town walls and castle's defences be slighted (damaged and made useless as defences) so that they could not be used again as a fortification. From then on, what remained of the castle was used as a court and a gaol, but its state of repair gradually worsened. By the late 17th century, it was in the hands of Robert Haselrig.

Parts of the castle were still intact until the late 19th century, when the remains were sold to a railway company.

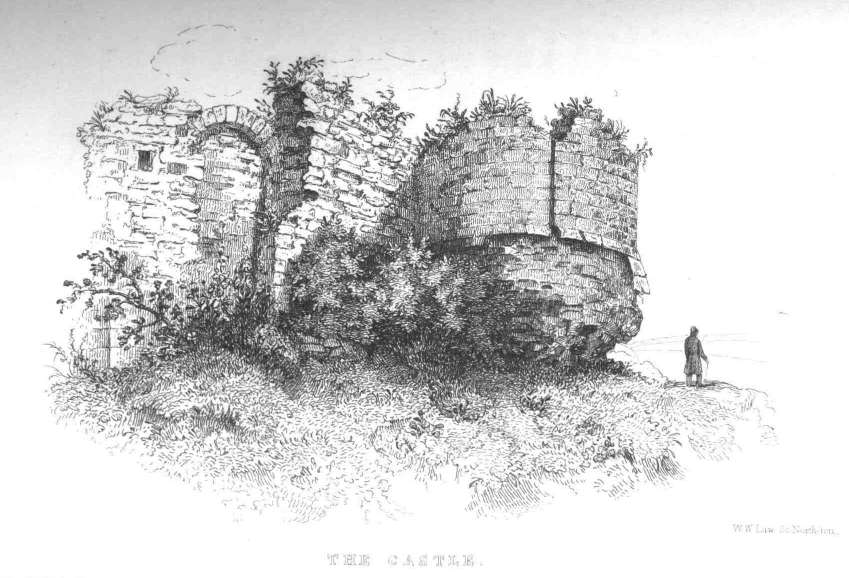
Northampton Castle bastion from Historical Memorials of Northampton by C. H. Hartshorne

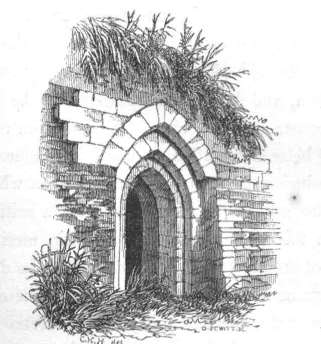
A postern at Northampton Castle from Hartshorne

=== Victorian era ===
The development of railways in England during the Victorian period initially by-passed Northampton. The main line from London, Euston, now known as the West Coast Main Line passed about five miles south of the town. However, in 1879 a loop line via Northampton was constructed. In that year the castle and its foundations were demolished by the London and North Western Railway for the construction of Northampton Castle railway station. The only remains that survived were some earth banks beside St Andrew's Road and the re-positioned postern gate, "a minor archway".

The station was rebuilt in 1963–64 with the suffix "Castle" to its name dropped as it had become the only remaining station in the town. Excavations in 1961 prior to the rebuilding revealed 12th-century defences including a ditch 90 feet wide and 30 feet deep and a bank 80 feet wide and 20 feet high.

=== 21st century ===
A volunteer group called the Friends of Northampton Castle (FONC) was established to publicise the castle and provide information about the history of the site and the castle itself. In July 2012, FONC commissioned a 3D reconstruction of the castle which was published on YouTube.

Expansion of the town and the 2011 launch of a Northampton Waterside Enterprise Zone made the need to expand and re-develop and double the size of the railway station, possibly with the name restored to "Northampton Castle". Work began in 2013. The opportunity was taken to carry out further, more extensive, excavations in 2012–13 which uncovered various items of Anglo-Saxon origin. Among their number were a brooch, pottery fragments and an ironstone wall.

Heritage poles were added to Castle Park in July 2025 to mark the location of the perimeter of Northampton Castle. They are part of a trail which outlines the history of Northampton and its castle.

== Literary connections ==
Northampton Castle is the location of the death of Prince Arthur, the young nephew to King John and claimant to the throne, in Shakespeare's King John, Act IV Scene III, in which he leaps to his death from the castle walls in an escape attempt.

The fate of the real-life Prince Arthur remains mysterious. He was last recorded as a sixteen-year-old captive in Rouen Castle in April 1203, whereafter he was rumoured to have been killed on King John's orders. It may be thought more likely that he died in France rather than England.
