= Battle of Northampton (1264) =

Battle in the Second Barons' War

Coordinates: 52.237°N 0.905°W

- Part of Second Barons' War
Date	5 April 1264
Location	Northampton Castle
Result	Royal victory

Belligerents
Royal forces	Baronial forces

Commanders and leaders
Henry III; Roger Mortimer; Philip Marmion	Simon de Montfort; Simon de Montfort the Younger (POW)

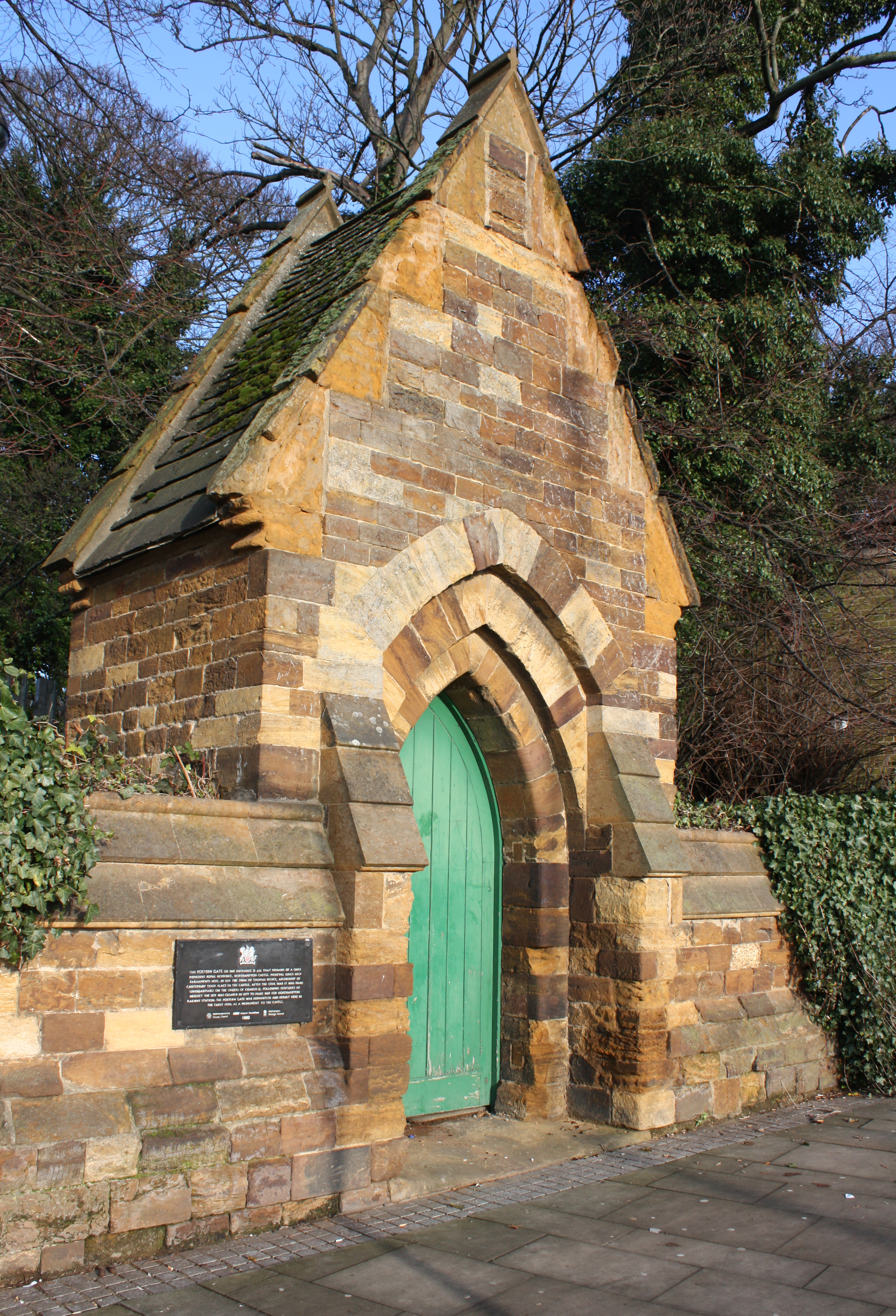
The remains of Northampton Castle

The Battle of Northampton took place during the Second Barons' War. The battle was a decisive victory for the royalist forces of King Henry III of England, who took Northampton Castle and captured Simon de Montfort (the Younger), son of Simon de Montfort (the Older).

== Prelude ==
In April 1264 the Second Barons' War began. Absolved by Pope Urban IV from his oath to observe the Provisions of Oxford, Henry III summoned his men and raises the Royal Standard at Oxford, on April 3. A royalist advanced party reached Northampton on a Friday evening on April 5, and summoned the defenders to surrender, which they declined to do. Several sources suggest the garrison expected to hold out until Simon de Montfort (the Older) could relieve them.

== Battle ==
On April 5, 1264, the encounter took place, royalist forces advanced over the water meadows south of the town to attack its main gate with 'engines', which might just mean ladders or hurdles. Meanwhile, another party rode clockwise along the built-up area's western perimeter, looking for an easier entrance. While the townsmen entrusted with the southern sector held up the initial attack, the outflanking detachment found a breach in the garden wall of St. Andrew's Priory, at the north of the town. Simon de Montfort (the Younger) reacted to the break-in, riding up on his horse with his squire and an unknown sergeant to contest the breach. But Simon was captured and threw the defenders into disarray. Simon de Montfort (the Older) mounted a rear-guard rescue attempt but on April 6 the castle fell.

== Possible side-effect ==
Participation of academics in the University of Northampton against the monarchy may have contributed to the abolition of the 1261–1265, short-lived, university. This was the third university in England, after Oxford and Cambridge, and the twenty-second in Europe. After being advised by bishops and magnates that Northampton was a threat to Oxford University, Henry III dissolved it in 1265 and signed a Royal Decree that banned the establishment of a university in Northampton. The decree was superseded by an Act authorising the University of Northampton to be established in the 21st century.
