= William of Wheatley =

English schoolmaster and author (fl. 1305–1317)

William of Wheatley or Whetley (fl. 1305–1317) was an English divine, schoolmaster, and author. He studied at Oxford and possibly Paris, became a schoolmaster, was made rector of Yatesbury, and wrote philosophical texts and other works.

== Life ==
William seems to have studied at Oxford (probably in 1300), and in Paris about 1301. He was ordained acolyte in 1305 by the Bishop of Paris, and was presented by John Droxford to be rector of Sulham, Berkshire, in the same year. He had been made master of the grammar school at Stamford by 1309, and was promoted to be master of the cathedral grammar school at Lincoln by 1316. He was appointed rector of Yatesbury in Wiltshire in 1317.

== Works ==
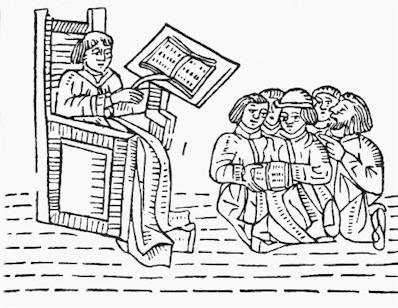
A medieval classroom

His works are:

1. A commentary on Boethius's De Disciplina Scholasticorum (MSS. in Exeter College, Oxford, xxviii. and Pembroke College, Cambridge).
2. Another Super Divisiones ejusdem.
3. A commentary on Boethius's De Consolatione Philosophiæ (MSS. in Exeter College, xxviii. and New College, Oxford, cclxiv., and in Pembroke College, Cambridge).
4. Epistolæ ad diversos.
5. De signis prognosticis sterilitatis.
6. Duo hymni de vita et moribus B. Hugonis episcopi Lincolniensis.

The three last are in the manuscript at New College, Oxford (cclxiv.).

== Sources ==
- Orme, Nicholas (2010). "Wheatley, William (fl. 1305–1317), schoolmaster and author". Oxford Dictionary of National Biography (online ed.). Oxford University Press. doi:10.1093/ref:odnb/29483. (Subscription or UK public library membership required.)

Attribution:

- This article incorporates text from a publication now in the public domain: Rhodes, Walter Eustace (1900). "William of Wheatley". In Lee, Sidney (ed.). Dictionary of National Biography. Vol. 61. London: Smith, Elder & Co. p. 377.
