= Lewis de Charleton =

14th-century Bishop of Hereford

- Bishop of Hereford
- Appointed: 10 September 1361
- Term ended: 23 May 1369
- Predecessor: John Trilleck
- Successor: William Courtenay

Orders
- Consecration: 3 October 1361

Personal details
- Died: 1369
- Denomination: Catholic

Lewis de Charleton (Note: Or Lewis Charlton, Lewes de Cherlton) (died 23 May 1369) was a medieval Bishop of Hereford in England.

== Life ==
Charleton was educated, it is said, at both Oxford and Cambridge, but was more closely connected with Oxford, of which he became a doctor of civil law and a licentiate, if not also a doctor, in theology. In 1336, he became prebendary of Hereford Cathedral, of which see his kinsman Thomas Charlton was then bishop. He next appears, with his brother Humphrey, as holding prebends in the collegiate church of Pontesbury, of which Baron Charlton was patron. In 1340, Adam of Coverton petitioned to the king against him on the ground of obstructing him in collecting tithes belonging to St. Michael's, Shrewsbury. A royal commission was appointed to inquire into the case, which in 1345 was still pending. Lewis had apparently succeeded Thomas the bishop to this prebend, and on his resignation in 1359 was succeeded by Humphrey, who held all three prebends in succession. In 1348, he appears as signing, as doctor of civil law, an indenture between the town and university of Oxford that they should have a common assize and assay of weights and measures. He was probably continuously resident as a teacher at Oxford; of which university his brother became chancellor some time before 1354. It is sometimes, but without authority, asserted that Lewis himself was chancellor. He constantly acted, however, in important business in conjunction with his brother. In 1354, a great feud broke out between town and university, culminating in the St Scholastica Day riot and at the brothers’ petition the king conditionally liberated some townsmen from prison and granted his protection for a year to the scholars. For these and other services they were enrolled in the album of benefactors, and in 1356 an annual mass for the two was directed to be henceforth celebrated on St. Edmund’s day.

William of Wykeham is said to have been among Charlton’s pupils in mathematics. Charlton’s Inn took its name from one of the brothers or from some others of the name about the same time connected with) the university. At last Lewis was raised by revision of Pope Innocent VI to the bishopric of Hereford (10 September 1361), having already been elected by a part of the chapter, although the preference of another part for John Barnet, archdeacon of London, had probably necessitated the reference to Avignon. Charlton was consecrated at Avignon on 3 October of the same year.

Charleton's presence there rather suggests some mission or office at the papal Curia. On 3 November, he made the profession of obedience and received his spiritualities of Archbishop Simon Islip at Oxford, and on 14 November his temporalities were restored. Little is recorded of his acts as bishop. His attention to his parliamentary duties is shown by his appearing as trier, of petitions in 1362, 1363, 1365, 1366, and 1368.

Charleton died on 23 May 1369, and was buried in the south-east transept of his cathedral, where his mutilated monument still remains. He left by his will his mitre and some vestments, together with £40, to the cathedral.

== Family ==
Lewis de Charleton's brother Humphrey de Cherlton was the Chancellor of Oxford University from 1354–7. Lewis de Charleton himself may have been chancellor of the university in 1357.

== Citations ==
Academic offices
Preceded by Humphrey de Cherlton	Chancellor of the University of Oxford; 1357	Succeeded by John de Hotham
Catholic Church titles
Preceded by John Trilleck	Bishop of Hereford; 1361–1369	Succeeded by William Courtenay
