= St Scholastica Day riot =

1355 riot in Oxford, England

Coordinates: 51°45′7″N 1°15′26″W

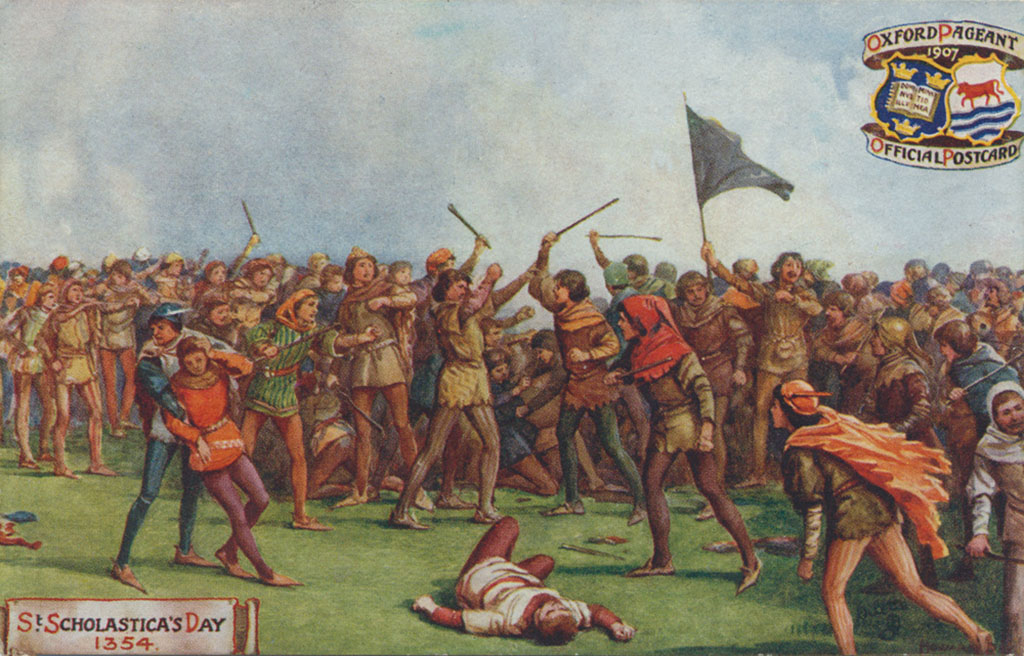
St Scholastica Day riot, as depicted on a 1907 postcard

The St Scholastica Day riot began in Oxford, England, on 10 February 1355, the feast day of St Scholastica. The disturbance began when two students from the University of Oxford complained about the quality of wine served to them in the Swindlestock Tavern, which stood at the crossroads now known as Carfax, in the centre of the town. The students quarrelled with the taverner; the argument quickly escalated to blows. The inn's customers joined in on both sides, and the resulting mêlée turned into a riot. The violence started by the bar brawl continued over three days, with armed gangs entering the town from the countryside to assist the townspeople. University halls and students' accommodation were raided and the inhabitants murdered; there were some reports of scholars being scalped. Around twenty townsfolk were killed, as were up to sixty-three members of the university.

Violent disagreements between townspeople and students had arisen several times previously, and twelve of the twenty-nine coroners' courts held in Oxford between 1297 and 1322 concerned murders by students. The University of Cambridge was established in 1209 by scholars who left Oxford following the lynching of two students by the town's citizens.

King Edward III sent judges to the town with commissions of oyer and terminer to determine what had gone on and to advise what steps should be taken. He came down on the side of the university authorities, who were given additional powers and responsibilities to the disadvantage of the town's authorities. The town was fined 500 marks (Note: A medieval English mark was an accounting unit equivalent to two-thirds of a pound. For comparison, the average wage of an agricultural worker in the 1290s was less than 1 1/2 d a day (equivalent to £15 in 2025).) and its mayor and bailiffs were sent to the Marshalsea prison in London. John Gynwell, the Bishop of Lincoln, imposed an interdict on the town for one year, which banned all religious practices, including services (except on key feast days), burials and marriages; only baptisms of young children were allowed.

An annual penance was imposed on the town: each year, on St Scholastica's Day, the mayor, bailiffs and sixty townspeople were to attend a Mass at the University Church of St Mary the Virgin for those killed; the town was also made to pay the university an annual fine of one penny for each scholar killed. The practice was dropped in 1825; in 1955—the 600th anniversary of the riots—in an act of conciliation the city's mayor was given an honorary degree, while the university's vice-chancellor was made an honorary freeman of the city.

== Background ==
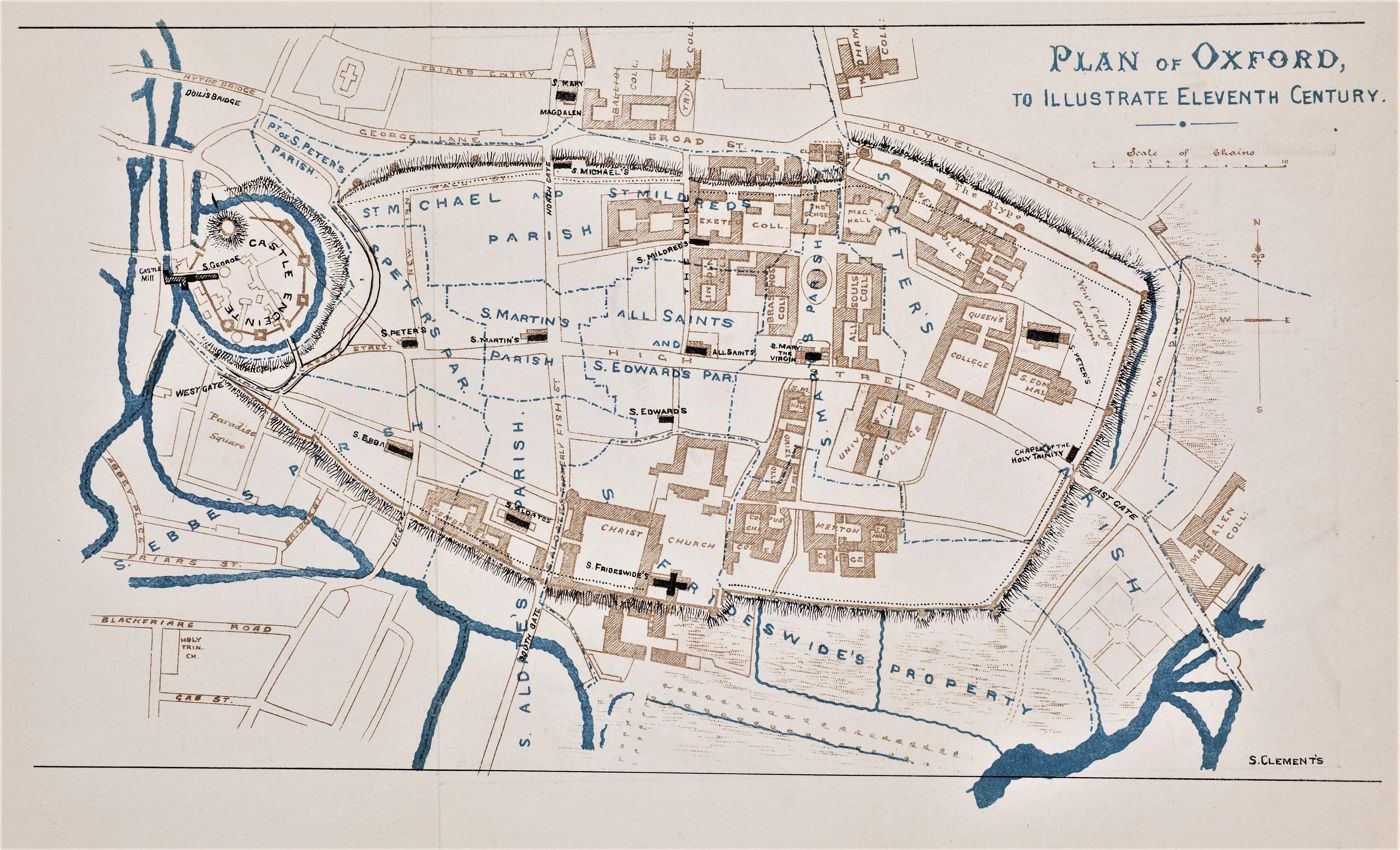
Map of Oxford, showing some eleventh-century buildings in black. Rivers are in solid blue. Brown buildings and parish boundaries (in dotted blue) are later.

University teaching has been ongoing at Oxford since 1096; its university grew rapidly from 1167 and was given a royal charter in 1248, formalising some of its positions and functions. The university was an ecclesiastical institution and while there were lay students, those who attended were called clerks; (Note: "Clerk" is derived from the Latin word clericus and originally meant "man in a religious order, cleric, clergyman".) their heads were expected to be tonsured to show their religious status. Seventeen per cent of the students were monks, and the remainder were overwhelmingly secular clergy—other priests and deacons—between 1200 and 1500.

In 1334 Oxford, a town of 5,000 residents, was the ninth wealthiest settlement in England. (Note: The figure is based on the taxable wealth of the citizens. Oxford was a town until 1542 when Henry VIII founded six new bishoprics, including one for Oxford. City status came with the new diocese.) In 1349 the Black Death affected the town; there are no reliable figures for the deaths in the town, but the mortality rate in England has been estimated at 65 per cent. The historian Guy Lytle observed that Oxford "was certainly hit by plague, but its impact on the university remains an open question". The town began to recover soon afterwards, but its finances had been deeply affected. During the first part of the fourteenth century the population was aware of the decline of Oxford's fortunes, and this coincided with disturbance and unrest between the town and university.

Although co-operation between the university's senior members and the town's burgesses was the norm, town and gown rivalry existed and relations would periodically deteriorate into violence. On the occasions when peace settlements were imposed on the two sides, the outcome favoured the university. In 1209 two Oxford scholars were lynched by the town's locals following the death of a woman; most of the masters and students left the town to study elsewhere, including some who settled in Cambridge to start that city's university that year. Oxford's university remained shut until the civic authorities requested that a papal legate intercede to bring the matter to a close. That legate, Niccolò de Romanis, included in his judgement of 1214 a clause that stated that if a scholar was arrested by the civic authorities, they would have to hand him over to the Bishop of Lincoln, the archdeacon of the town or the bishop's named deputy, if any of the three requested. This put the students under the protection of the church, giving them privileges over the town's residents. (Note: The Bishop of Lincoln oversaw the diocese of Lincoln, which was the largest in England and covered Lincolnshire, Bedfordshire, Buckinghamshire, Huntingdonshire, Leicestershire, Northamptonshire, Rutland and Oxfordshire.) In 1248 a Scottish scholar was murdered by the citizens; Robert Grosseteste, the Bishop of Lincoln, enforced a ban of excommunication on the culprits and Henry III fined the town's authorities 80 marks. Violence continued to break out periodically and 12 of the 29 coroners' courts held between 1297 and 1322 concerned murders committed by students. Many of these went unpunished by both the university and the law. In February 1298 a citizen was murdered by a student and a student was killed by townspeople, following an attack on one of the town's bailiffs—officers of the court who executed writs; bailiffs were then involved in the rioting that followed. The townsfolk responsible for killing the scholar were excommunicated and the town was fined £200 in damages; there were no punishments given to the students. (Note: £200 equates to approximately £197,000 in 2025, according to calculations based on the Consumer Price Index measure of inflation. For comparison, the average wage of an agricultural worker in the 1290s was less than 1 1/2 d a day (equivalent to £15 in 2025).) This was the first occasion that the town's bailiffs were recorded as taking part in the violence; it was a feature of several subsequent altercations.

Often the scholars rioted among themselves, as they did in 1252, 1267, 1273 and 1333–1334. By the early fourteenth century "altercations and violence between citizens and scholars were commonplace", according to the historian Laurence Brockliss. In a 1314 riot between the two main factions of the university—the Northernmen and the Southernmen—thirty-nine students were known to have committed murder or manslaughter; seven were arrested and the remainder claimed the benefit of clergy and sought religious sanctuary or escaped.

== Dispute ==
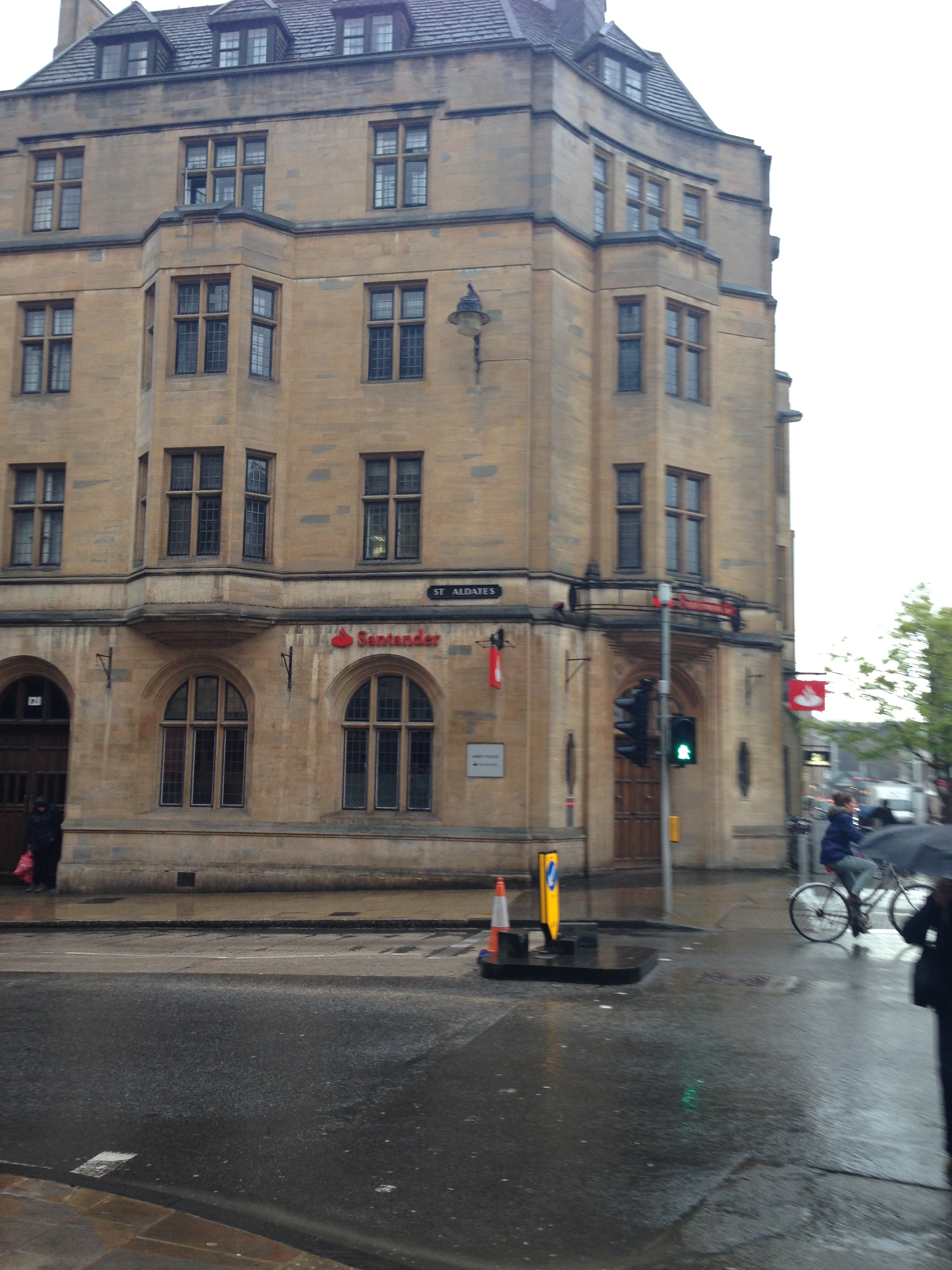
Site of the Swindlestock Tavern

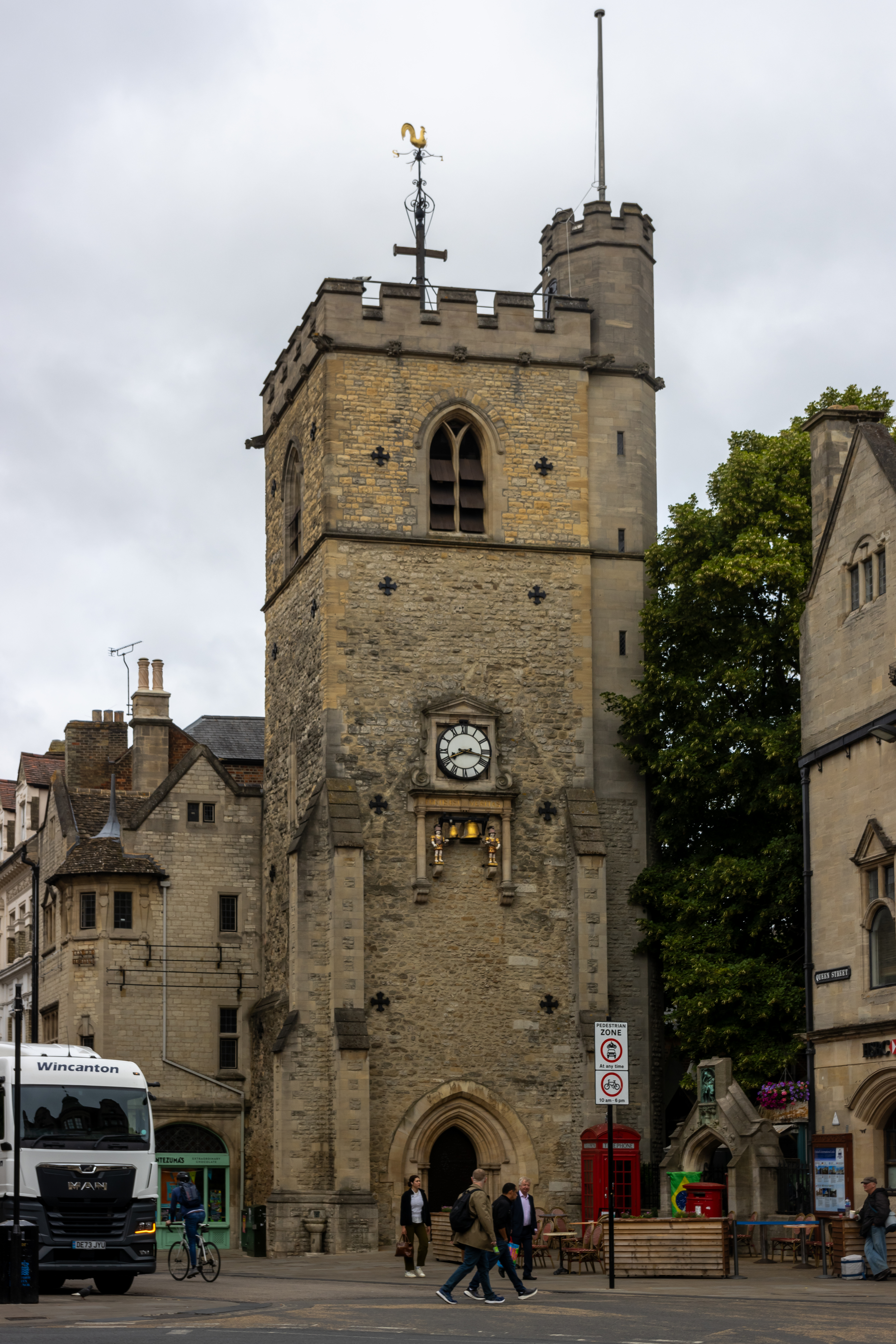
Carfax Tower, then the tower of St Martin's church

On 10 February 1355—St Scholastica's Day—several university students went for a drink at the Swindlestock Tavern. (Note: The spelling is also given in sources as 'Swyndlestock'.) The tavern was located in the centre of Oxford, on the corner of St Aldate's and Queen Street, at Quatrevoies (now Carfax); the tavern was a regular drinking spot for the students. Two of the group were Walter de Spryngeheuse and Roger de Chesterfield, beneficed clergymen from South West England; de Spryngeheuse was the rector of Cricket St Thomas in Somerset and de Chesterfield was the rector of Ipplepen in Devon. They were served wine by John de Croydon (also given as John Croidon), who was the tavern's vintner; the antiquarian Anthony Wood, among others, describes him as a friend of John de Bereford, who was the tavern's owner and the mayor of Oxford. De Spryngeheuse and de Chesterfield complained to de Croydon that the wine was sub-standard and asked that they be served a better drink. De Croydon refused to listen to the complaints and an argument developed between the men. As a result de Chesterfield threw his drink in de Croydon's face. Sources differ on what happened next: according to those sympathetic to the university, de Chesterfield threw his wooden drinking vessel at de Croydon's head; those sympathetic to the townsfolk say the student beat him around the head with the pot. A petition by the town authorities to Parliament said the students "threw the said wine in the face of John Croidon, taverner, and then with the said quart pot beat the said John".

Other customers—both locals and students—joined in the fight, which spilled out of the tavern and onto the crossroads now known as Carfax. Within half an hour the brawl had developed into a riot. To summon assistance, the locals rang the bell at St Martin's, the town's church; the students rang the bells of the University Church of St Mary the Virgin. The chancellor of the university, Humphrey de Cherlton, tried to calm both sides before things got too far out of hand, but arrows were shot at him and he retreated from the scene. Men from both sides armed themselves. When night fell the violence died down; at this stage no-one had been killed or badly wounded.

The following morning, in an attempt to stop any recurrence of the violence, the chancellor issued a proclamation at the churches of St Martin and St Mary that no-one should bear arms, assault anyone or disturb the peace. At the same time, the town's bailiffs were urging townsfolk to arm themselves; the bailiffs were also paying people in the surrounding countryside to come to aid the citizens. About eighty townsmen, armed with bows and other weapons, went to St Giles' Church in the north part of the town, where they knew some scholars were, and chased them to the Augustinian priory, killing at least one student and badly injuring several others on the way. (Note: The priory was situated where Wadham College now stands.) The bells of both the town and university churches were rung to rally the respective factions; students locked and barricaded some of the town's gates, to stop an influx of outsiders coming at them from a new direction.

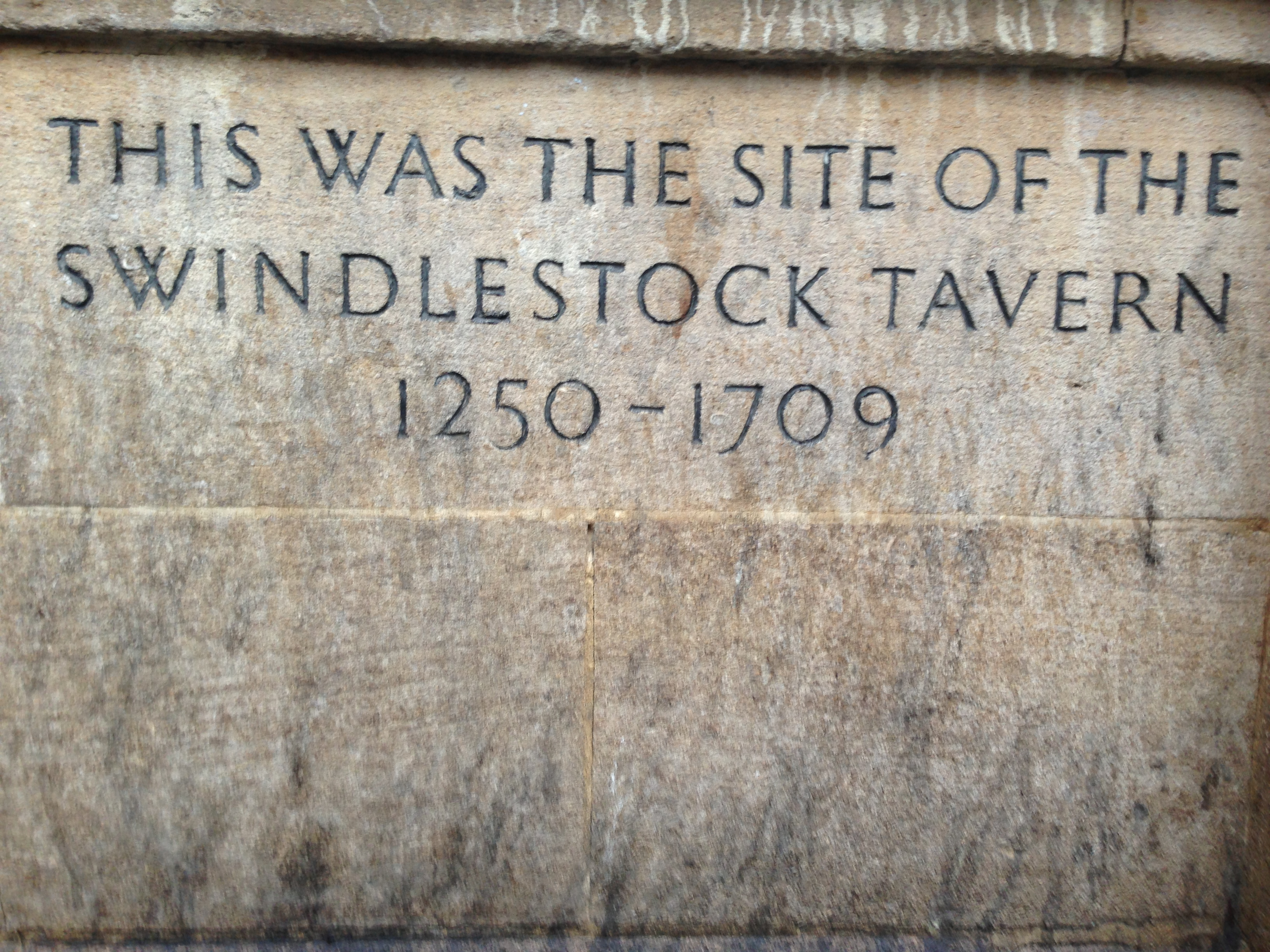
The plaque commemorating the site of the Swindlestock Tavern, which stood between 1250 and 1709

Late in the day of 11 February, up to 2,000 people from the countryside came in through the western gate of the town to join the townsfolk, waving a black banner. The students, unable to fight against such a number, withdrew to their halls where they barricaded themselves in. The citizens broke into inns and hostels; any student who was found in his rented rooms or hiding place was killed or maimed. After the violence subsided that night, the authorities from the town and the university went through the streets proclaiming in the King's name "that no man should injure the scholars or their goods under pain of forfeiture".

In the early hours of the following morning de Cherlton and other senior members of the university left for nearby Woodstock to meet King Edward III, who was staying in the village. The proclamation from the King to the townsfolk had no effect and the fighting began again. There were reports that some of the scholars were scalped, possibly "in mockery of their clerical tonsures", according to the historian William Pantin. The corpses of other students were buried in dunghills, left in the gutters, dumped into privies or cesspits or thrown into the River Thames.

By the evening of the third day the violence had died down. Many of the scholars had fled Oxford, and much of the town had been burnt down. Many of the student halls had been plundered or vandalised, except that of Merton College, whose students had a reputation for quietness. There is no known figure for the number of townspeople killed, although the historian Ian Mortimer puts the figure at twenty. The number of students killed in the riots is often given as sixty-three.

== Resolution ==
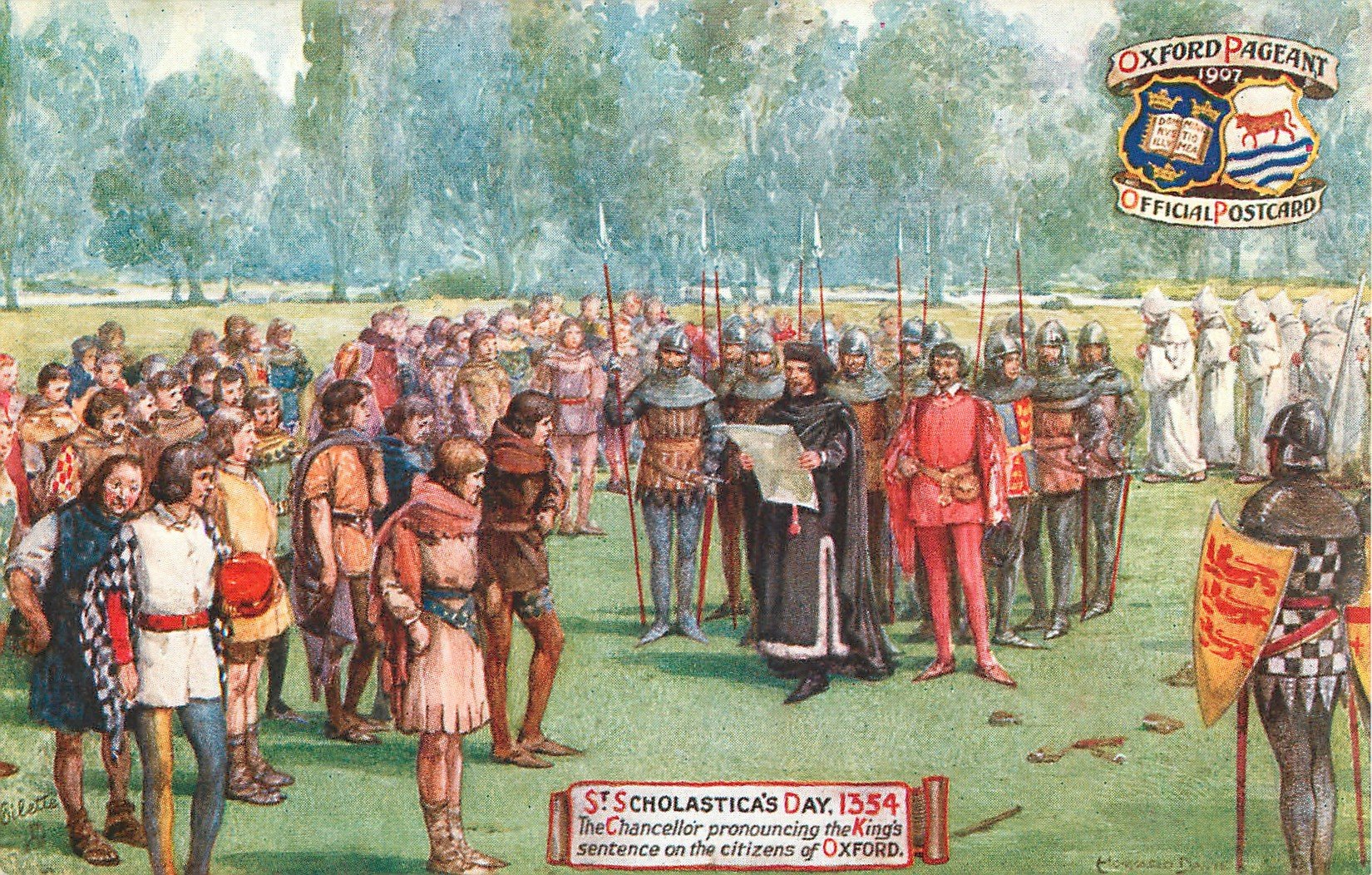
Ending the St Scholastica Day riot, as depicted on a 1907 postcard

After the rioting ended both the university authorities and the town burghers surrendered the rights of their respective organisations to the King. He sent judges to the town with commissions of oyer and terminer to determine what had gone on and to advise what steps should be taken. Four days later the King restored the rights of the scholars and gave them pardons for any offences. He fined the town 500 marks and sent the town's mayor and bailiffs to the Marshalsea prison in London. While the royal commission was in place, John Gynwell, the Bishop of Lincoln, imposed an interdict on the townspeople, and banned all religious practices, including services, burials and marriages; only baptisms of young children were allowed.

On 27 June 1355 Edward issued a royal charter that secured the rights of the university over those of the town. The document gave the chancellor of the university the right to tax bread and drink sold in the town, the power to assay the weights and measures used in commerce in Oxford and its environs, rights relating to the commercial side of Oxford and the power to insist that inhabitants kept their properties in good repair. The town authorities lost the authority to take action in a legal situation involving a student or the university on either side and were left with the power to take action in legal situations only where it involved citizens on both sides. Mortimer observes that Edward brought the matter to a close quickly, in contrast to many legal disputes of the time, which could take several years to be settled. With the French reneging on the Treaty of Guînes—meaning that renewed warfare with both France and Scotland was imminent—he needed the rioting and its underlying causes settled quickly. (Note: By the autumn of 1355 Edward III was in northern France leading an army against that of John II of France, the French King, while at the same time his son the Black Prince led his destructive grande chevauchée 675 miles from English-held Bordeaux to the Mediterranean and back.)

When the interdict was lifted by the Bishop of Lincoln after over a year, he imposed an annual penance on the town. Each year, on St Scholastica's Day, the mayor, bailiffs and sixty townspeople were to attend St Mary's church for mass for those killed; the town was also made to pay the university an annual fine of one penny for each scholar killed. When each new mayor or sheriff was sworn in, he had to swear to uphold all the university's rights.

== Aftermath ==
A series of verses, "Poems Relating to the Riot Between Town and Gown on St. Scholastica's Day", was written; these are in Latin and many are held in the Bodleian, the main research library of the University of Oxford. According to the historian Henry Furneaux, who edited the works in the nineteenth century, they could have been written between 1356 and 1357 or in the early fifteenth century. The medievalist Arthur Rigg considers the style of the verses is similar to those by the fifteenth-century friar Richard Tryvytlam. Rigg, examining the first poem of the series, considers it to be anti-town in its depiction of the events, quoting:

On homes the cowards launch attacks,
And hack with hatchet and with axe.
Outside they set their fires alight;
The brave their doors defend and fight.

Edward's charter did not end the conflict between the town of Oxford and the university, although there was a hiatus in rioting. There were further incidents over the following centuries, although these were on a much smaller scale than the events of 1355. According to Cobban, "the St Scholastica's Day riot was ... the last of the extreme bloody encounters" between town and gown; subsequent grievances were settled in the courts or by appealing to the government. During the reign of Henry VIII both the university and the town authorities petitioned Thomas Wolsey, the Lord Chancellor, about who held jurisdiction on various points.

The historian C. H. Lawrence observes that the charter "was the climax of a long series of royal privileges which raised the university from the status of a protected resident to that of the dominant power in the city". Scholars were free from interference from or prosecution by the civil authorities and the chancellor's jurisdiction covered both civil and religious matters in the town; it was a unique position for any university in Europe. The power of the university over the commercial aspects of the town ensured that the colleges were able to acquire much of the central areas of Oxford at the expense of merchants, and the dominance of the land ownership by the university, particularly in the Carfax environs, is a result of the settlement following the riots. One unintended corollary of the growing power of the university was that Oxford did not accommodate plays or theatre until the sixteenth century. There were other prominent factors in the lack of development of theatre in Oxford, including a lack of a cathedral in the town—which meant no religious plays were performed for pilgrims—and the town's small and weak guilds were not able to produce them. The historian Roderick Robertson considers that because of the strength of the university compared to the town, "it does not appear strange that the town did not nurture any plays; its strength had constantly been sapped by the growing University".

The annual penance undertaken by the mayor continued until 1825 when the incumbent refused to take part and the practice was allowed to lapse. Several previous mayors had refused to take part in the annual event: they were fined heavily. In an act of conciliation on 10 February 1955—the 600th anniversary of the riots—the city's mayor, W. R. Gowers, was given an honorary degree and the university's vice-chancellor, Alic Halford Smith, was made an honorary freeman of the city, at a commemoration of the events.

== Historiography ==
The historian Alan Cobban observes that the two contemporary histories of the events differ in their allocation of blame; he considers that "given that propaganda and exaggeration were involved in these accounts, the whole truth may never be found." He identifies two sources of primary documentation, Oxford City Documents, Financial and Judicial, 1258–1665, edited by Thorold Rogers in 1891, and Medieval Archives of the University of Oxford: Vol 1, edited by Herbert Edward Salter in 1920. The historian Jeremy Catto adds Collectanea, edited by Montagu Burrows of the Oxford Historical Society in 1896.

== See also ==
- Medieval university
- 1229 University of Paris strike
- Authentica habita
- Benefit of clergy
- Battle of Carfax

== Notes and references ==
=== Sources ===
==== Books ====
- Beckett, John (2017). City Status in the British Isles, 1830–2002. Abingdon, Oxfordshire: Routledge. ISBN 978-1-3519-5126-5.
- Benedictow, Ole J. (2021). The Complete History of the Black Death. Woodbridge, Suffolk: Boydell and Brewer. ISBN 978-1-7874-4931-2.
- Boardman, Carl (1994). Oxfordshire Sinners and Villains. Stroud, Gloucestershire: Alan Sutton Publishing. ISBN 978-0-7509-0416-2.
- Brockliss, L. W. B. (2016). The University of Oxford: A History. Oxford: Oxford University Press. ISBN 978-0-19-924356-3.
- Burrows, Montagu, ed. (1896). Collectanea. Oxford: Clarendon Press. OCLC 832219035.
- Catto, J. I. (1984). "Citizens, Scholars and Masters". In Catto, J. I. (ed.). The History of the University of Oxford. Vol. 1: The Early Oxford Schools. Oxford: Clarendon Press. pp. 151–192. ISBN 978-0-19-951011-5.
- Chance, Eleanor; Colvin, Christina; Cooper, Janet; Day, C. J.; Hassall, T. G.; Jessup, Mary; Selwyn, Nesta (1979). "Medieval Oxford". In Crossley, Alan; Elrington, C. R. (eds.). A History of the County of Oxford. Vol. 4, The City of Oxford. Oxford: Oxford University Press. pp. 3–73. ISBN 978-0-1972-2714-5.
- Cheetham, Hal (1971). Portrait of Oxford. London: Hale. ISBN 978-0-7091-2415-3.
- Cobban, Alan (1992). The Medieval English Universities: Oxford and Cambridge to c. 1500. Berkeley, California: University of California Press. ISBN 978-0-5200-6244-3.
- Cobban, Alan (2002). English University Life in the Middle Ages. London: Routledge. ISBN 978-1-135-36395-6.
- Crossley, Alan (1979). A History of the County of Oxford. Vol. 4, The City of Oxford. London: Victoria County History. ISBN 978-0-1972-2714-5.
- Evans, G. R. (2007). John Wyclif. Oxford: Lion Hudson. ISBN 978-0-7459-5291-8.
- Evans, G. R. (2010). The University of Oxford: A New History. London: I.B.Tauris. ISBN 978-0-85773-025-1.
- Glasscock, R. E. (1976). "England circa 1334". In Darby, Henry Clifford (ed.). A New Historical Geography of England Before 1600. Cambridge: Cambridge University Press. pp. 136–185. ISBN 978-0-521-29144-6.
- Hackett, M. B. (1984). "The University as a Corporate Body". In Catto, J. I. (ed.). The History of the University of Oxford: The Early Oxford Schools. Oxford: Clarendon Press. pp. 37–96. ISBN 978-0-19-951011-5.
- Harding, Alan (1993). England in the Thirteenth Century. Cambridge: Cambridge University Press. ISBN 978-0-521-31612-5.
- Harding, V. (2002). The Dead and the Living in Paris and London, 1500–1670. Cambridge: Cambridge University Press. ISBN 978-0-52181-126-2.
- Honey, Derek (10 November 2003). Oxford Beyond the University. Witney, Oxfordshire: Affleck Press. ISBN 978-0-9546-3030-0.
- Horan, David (1999). Oxford: A Cultural and Literary Companion. Oxford: Signal Books. ISBN 978-1-902669-05-2.
- Lawrence, C. H. (1984). "The University in State and Church". In Catto, J. I. (ed.). The History of the University of Oxford: The Early Oxford Schools. Oxford: Clarendon Press. pp. 97–150. ISBN 978-0-19-951011-5.
- Leedham-Green, E. S. (1996). A Concise History of the University of Cambridge. Cambridge: Cambridge University Press. ISBN 978-0-521-43978-7.
- Lytle, Guy (1974). "Patronage Patterns and Oxford Colleges c. 1300–c. 1530". In Stone, Lawrence (ed.). The University in Society. Princeton, New Jersey: Princeton University Press. pp. 111–150. ISBN 978-0-6910-5213-7.
- McHardy, A. K. (2001). The Age of War and Wycliffe: Lincoln Diocese and Its Bishop in the Later Fourteenth Century. Lincoln, Lincolnshire: Lincoln Cathedral Publications. ISBN 978-1-8705-6124-2.
- Morris, Jan (2001). Oxford. Oxford: Oxford University Press. ISBN 978-0-19-280136-4.
- Mortimer, Ian (2008). The Perfect King: The Life of Edward III, Father of the English Nation. London: Vintage. ISBN 978-0-7953-3548-8.
- Pantin, W. A. (1972). Oxford Life in Oxford Archives. Oxford: Clarendon Press. ISBN 978-0-1982-2351-1.
- Parker, James (1871). On the History of Oxford During the Tenth and Eleventh Centuries, (912–1100). Oxford. OCLC 1051525769.
- Rigg, A. G. (1992). A History of Anglo-Latin Literature, 1066–1422. Cambridge: Cambridge University Press. ISBN 978-0-5214-1594-1.
- Rogers, Clifford (2014) [2000]. War Cruel and Sharp: English Strategy under Edward III, 1327–1360. Woodbridge, Suffolk: Boydell Press. ISBN 978-0-8511-5804-4.
- Wagner, John A. (2006). Encyclopedia of the Hundred Years War (PDF). Westport, Connecticut: Greenwood Press. ISBN 978-0-3133-2736-0. Archived from the original (PDF) on 16 July 2018.
- Wood, Anthony (1792). The History and Antiquities of the University of Oxford. Oxford: Printed for the editor. OCLC 22265745.
- Workman, Herbert B. (2012). John Wyclif; A Study of the English Medieval Church. Vol. 1. Eugene, Oregon: Wipf and Stock Publishers. ISBN 978-1-62032-569-8.

==== Journals and magazines ====
- Carrel, Helen (2009). "The Ideology of Punishment in Late Medieval English Towns". Social History. 34 (3): 301–320. doi:10.1080/03071020902981626. ISSN 0307-1022. JSTOR 25594368.
- Clark, Gregory (2007). "The Long March of History: Farm Wages, Population, and Economic Growth, England 1209-1869". The Economic History Review. 60 (1): 97–135. doi:10.1111/j.1468-0289.2006.00358.x. ISSN 0013-0117. JSTOR 4121997.
- Courtenay, William J. (1980). "The Effect of the Black Death on English Higher Education". Speculum. 55 (4): 696–714. doi:10.2307/2847661. ISSN 0038-7134. JSTOR 2847661.
- Musgrave, L. Curtis (February 1972). "Medieval University Life". History Today. 22 (2). ISSN 0018-2753.
- Robertson, Roderick (March 1969). "Oxford Theatre in Tudor Times". Educational Theatre Journal. 21 (1): 41–50. doi:10.2307/3205776. ISSN 0013-1989. JSTOR 3205776.

==== News sources ====
- "Oxford Recalls a Day in 1355". The Times. 11 February 1955. p. 10.
- "Town and Gown Make it up". The Manchester Guardian. 11 February 1955. p. 16.

==== Websites ====
- Clark, Gregory (2023). "The Annual RPI and Average Earnings for Britain, 1209 to Present (New Series)". MeasuringWorth.
- "clerk". Oxford English Dictionary (online ed.). Oxford University Press. (Subscription or participating institution membership required.)
- "Early Records". University of Cambridge. 28 January 2013.
- "Introduction and History". University of Oxford.
- "The St Scholastica Day Riot". University Church.
