= William Fitz Osbert =

English political agitator (d. 1196)

William Fitz Osbert or William with the long beard (died 1196) was a citizen of London who took up the role of "the advocate of the poor" in a popular uprising in the spring of 1196. Popular revolts by the poor and peasants in England were rare in the 12th century, and quickly and easily suppressed. The fullest known account of the revolt of 1196 comes from the contemporary English historian William of Newburgh in his Historia rerum anglicarum from a chapter entitled "Of a conspiracy made in London by one William, and how he paid the penalty of his audacity".

== The revolt ==
Fitz Osbert was a striking figure who held demagogue-like charismatic power over his followers. He had a long beard and was given the nickname "the Bearded". He had a University education, had been on the Third Crusade and held a civic office in London. A contemporary remarked "He was of ready wit, moderately skilled in literature, and eloquent beyond measure; and wishing ... to make himself a great name, he began to scheme ... upon the achievement of mighty plans."

Urban riots were uncommon in 12th and 13th century England with one dramatic exception, that of the events of the spring of 1196. Fitz Osbert had become a champion of the poor of London. He held gatherings with stirring speeches, travelled surrounded by mobs of the poor for protection, and started, according to one source, "a powerful conspiracy, inspired by the zeal of the poor against the insolence of the rich". He had gathered over 52,000 supporters, and stocks of weapons were cached throughout the city for the purpose of breaking into the houses of the rich citizens of London. He did not, however, overtly oppose the king, Richard I, and went to the king in Normandy to make clear his loyalty.

Nevertheless, Hubert Walter, Archbishop of Canterbury, decided that Fitz Osbert had to be stopped. He sent two accomplices to capture Fitz Osbert when he was alone and not surrounded by his mob. In the mêlée that followed one of the accomplices was killed and Osbert escaped with a few followers to take refuge in the nearby church of St Mary-le-Bow in Cheapside, intending not to seek sanctuary but to defend it as a fortress.

[1196] In this yere was one William with the long berde taken out of Bowe churche and put to dethe for herysey.

— Chronicle of the Grey Friars of London, 1852

Most of his supporters however, feared to defend the church by force, and Hubert surrounded it with armed men and had it burned down. As Fitz Osbert emerged from the smoke and flames he was stabbed and wounded in the belly by the son of the man whom he had earlier killed, upon which Osbert was taken into custody. Within days he was convicted and "first drawn asunder by horses, and then hanged on a gibbet with nine of his accomplices who refused to desert him". He was the first person to be executed at Tyburn, which later became the principal site of execution for offenders from London. His followers called him a martyr and the spot where he was hanged became a daily place of gathering; objects associated with his execution were venerated, and even the soil at the spot where he died was collected, resulting in the creation of a pit. Eventually armed guards were put in place to keep people away.

In later centuries such revolts would become more common; in the 12th and 13th centuries English kings were in constant trouble from revolts by the aristocracy, but rarely had trouble from the lower classes.

== Quotes ==
"I am the saviour of the poor. Do ye, oh, poor! who have experienced the heaviness of rich men's hands, drink from my wells the waters of the doctrine of salvation, and ye may do this joyfully; for the time of your visitation is at hand. For I will divide the waters from the waters. The people are the waters. I will divide the humble from the haughty and treacherous. I will separate the elect from the reprobate, as light from darkness."

== See also ==
- Revolt of 1173–1174 – Aristocratic revolt.
- University of Paris strike of 1229 – Student revolts.
