= Adam Orleton =

14th-century Bishop of Hereford

- Bishop of Winchester
- Church: Catholic Church
- Appointed: 1 December 1333
- Term ended: 18 July 1345
- Predecessor: John de Stratford
- Successor: William Edington
- Previous posts: Bishop of Hereford; Bishop of Worcester

Orders
- Consecration: 22 May 1317

Personal details
- Died: 18 July 1345
- Denomination: Catholic

Adam Orleton (Note: Or Adam of Orlton, Adam de Orlton, Adam de Orleton) (died 1345) was an English churchman and royal administrator. He was the Bishop of Winchester (1333–1345), Worcester (1327–1333), and Hereford (1317–1327) of the Catholic Church.

== Life ==
Orleton was born into a Herefordshire family, probably in Hereford, not Orleton. Many of his family had been Chief Bailiffs of the city. The lord of the manor was Roger Mortimer, to whose interests Orleton was loyal. His nephews were John Trilleck, Bishop of Hereford, and Thomas Trilleck, Bishop of Rochester.

From the accession of Edward II, Orleton was employed as a diplomat to the papal court, at Avignon from 1309, of Clement V and John XXII. A favourite of the latter, Orleton was nominated bishop of Hereford by the pope on 15 May 1317, and consecrated on 22 May 1317, despite the protests of the king. During his episcopate the great central tower at Hereford, a wonder of its day, was built, but there is no reason to think him responsible for a matter under the jurisdiction of the dean and chapter. Despite his increasing political involvement with Queen Isabella and Roger Mortimer against Edward II, playing a significant role in the events of 1326, Orleton was an effective bishop in Hereford diocese, and reformed the scandalous Wigmore Abbey and also the priory at Abergavenny and St. Guthlac's priory in Hereford.

Orleton was translated to be bishop of Worcester on 25 September 1327, and lastly to be bishop of Winchester on 1 December 1333.

British historian Ian Mortimer has recently argued that Orleton's sodomy accusations against Edward II in 1326–1327 may have been false, and that they may have been related to contemporary smear campaigns against one's political adversaries, such as previous similar aspersions cast against Pope Boniface VIII by Guillaume de Nogaret, Chancellor to King Philip IV of France, as well as those involved in dispossession of the Knights Templar, during which Orleton was a primary antagonist of the order

One assessment stated that

Bishop Adam, wary, unscrupulous, but at the same time vigorous and of unusual ability, played a great part in politics to the end of the wretched King's life. Some historians still believe that he recommended the murder; he certainly supported the deposition in Parliament, and went to Kenilworth as one of the commissioners to force the King's resignation. If thus interested in secular politics, he was no less watchful and vigilant in the affairs of his bishopric and the cathedral.

In 1327 Orleton briefly held the office of Lord High Treasurer, from January to March.

Orleton died on 18 July 1345.

== In literature ==
Deviating from his primary source text, Holinshed's Chronicles, Christopher Marlowe's play Edward II does not include a Bishop of Hereford. According to Holinshed, "The Bishop of Hereford vnder a sophisticall forme of words signified to them by his letters, that they should dispatch him [Edward] out of the waie.” Instead,

Marlowe makes Mortimer responsible for sending the letter, and does not mention the Bishop of Hereford, who was the author. This is another instance in which Marlowe puts the Bishop of Hereford in the background during the trouble over the imprisoned king in order to throw Mortimer into the limelight.

Orleton is a supporting character in Les Rois maudits (The Accursed Kings), a series of French historical novels by Maurice Druon. He was portrayed by Jean Lanier in the 1972 French miniseries adaptation of the series, and by Serge Maillat in the 2005 adaptation.

== Citations ==
Political offices
Preceded by John de Stratford	Lord High Treasurer; 1327	Succeeded by Henry Burghersh
Catholic Church titles
Preceded by Richard Swinefield	Bishop of Hereford; 1317–1327	Succeeded by Thomas Charlton
Preceded by Wulstan Bransford	Bishop of Worcester; 1327–1333	Succeeded by Simon Montacute
Preceded by John de Stratford	Bishop of Winchester; 1333–1345	Succeeded by William Edington
