= William de Palmorna =

English churchman and university chancellor

William de Palmorna DD (also Polmorva; died 1362) was an English medieval churchman, college head, and university chancellor.

William de Palmorna was a Fellow and Rector of Exeter College. In 1340, he was one of twelve Fellows selected for The Queen's College, Oxford by its founder Robert de Eglesfield. Between 1350 and 1351, he was Chancellor of the University of Oxford. He was a Doctor of Divinity. He was a prebendary at the King's Free Chapel in Hastings, within the Diocese of Chichester and also at Windsor. He died in 1362 and left a legacy to Exeter College.

Academic offices
Preceded by William Dobbe	Rectors of Exeter College, Oxford; 1336–1337	Succeeded by John de Blankeswille
Academic offices
Preceded by William de Hawkesworth	Chancellor of the University of Oxford; 1350–1351	Succeeded by Humphrey de Cherlton
