= Parens scientiarum =

Papal bull

Parens scientiarum Latin for 'The Mother of Sciences' Papal bull of Pope Gregory IX
- Signature date: 13 April 1231
- Subject: On the University of Paris

Parens scientiarum (Latin for "The Mother of Sciences") is the incipit designating a papal bull issued by Pope Gregory IX on April 13, 1231, after the University of Paris strike of 1229. The bull assured the independence and self-governance of the University of Paris, where the pope had studied theology.

== Context ==
During the European Middle Ages, the need for an educated and literate clergy would lead to the emergence of educational institutions under the purview and oversight of the Roman Catholic Church. This began in 5th and 6th centuries with the largely independent establishment of a handful of small monastic schools, such as that founded by Cassiodorus at the Vivarium. Church education in Western Europe would undergo a significant expansion during the rule of Charlemagne, who in 789, as part of the admonitio generalis, ordered that every monastery and bishopric establish a school to teach "the psalms, the notes, the chant, calculation, and grammar". In 1079, these efforts were renewed by Pope Gregory VII, who issued a papal bull mandating the establishment of schools at all cathedrals and major monasteries.

The need to provide clerics and a growing number of clerks with a higher level of education than previously offered led to the development of the studia generalia, which would evolve into the modern university. The University of Bologna, founded in 1088, is considered to be the first and oldest example. According to John Willinsky, a scholar specializing in the history of education at Stanford University, the formation of the universities was not planned or decreed, but rather began when "masters and scholars began to organize themselves, outside of episcopal schools, monasteries, and private tutoring arrangements". By the 13th century, the studium had become formally distinguished from older institutional forms by its admission of foreign students, instruction in the liberal arts as well as theology, law, and medicine, and that teaching was mostly carried out by magisters, holders of a master's degree.

Founded between 1150 and 1170, the University of Paris quickly achieved renown as a center of theological and philosophical learning. However, its exact legal status was poorly defined. Originally, it emerged from a number of cathedral and monastery schools in and around the Île de la Cité and received official license (permission to form) from the Chancellor of Notre-Dame, but otherwise operated independently, funded itself, and frequently clashed with Church authorities in Paris. The later would come to view the university and its faculty with increasing suspicion, "as a centre of insubordination and doctrinal licence". Moreover, in the initial decades of its existence, the university lacked a central governing body and, until 1208, had no written statutes. The magisters found themselves in a especially precarious situation. Because the university was not officially incorporated, those foreign-born were initially not exempted from special taxation, while those teaching controversial doctrine could be subject to direct criminal prosecution. In 1200, King Philip II of France issued a royal charter to the university declaring its status as an ecclesiastical institution outside the purview of royal law and answerable only to the Church.

Due to its prominence and the controversies surrounding it, the papacy began to take a direct and increasingly active role in regulating the University of Paris. Richard McKeon, a scholar of history and philosophy at the University of Chicago, referred to the University of Paris as "the object of special papal interest and control". In 1211, Pope Innocent III issued a brief that allowed the university to elect a proctor that would represent the university at the Vatican, allowing it to essentially bypass hostile church authorities in Paris and appeal directly to the more sympathetic Papal court in Rome. This also confirmed the university's status as a corporation, enabling the university to sue or be sued as a single body. In 1215, further papal recognition was granted on the condition of closer papal supervision over all aspects of university life. The resulting statutes, drafted by papal legate and professor of theology Robert of Courson, included rules mandating the teaching of Aristotle to all students, forbidding certain topics from being taught on feast days, banning those "smirched by any infamy" from lecturing, and imposing a dress code. In 1219, Pope Honorius III issued the papal bull Super Specula, which forbade the instruction of civil law at Paris in favor of theology and canon law.

== See also ==
- University of Paris strike of 1229
- Clerici vagantes
- Authentica habita
- Benefit of clergy
