= 1229 University of Paris strike =

Student strike

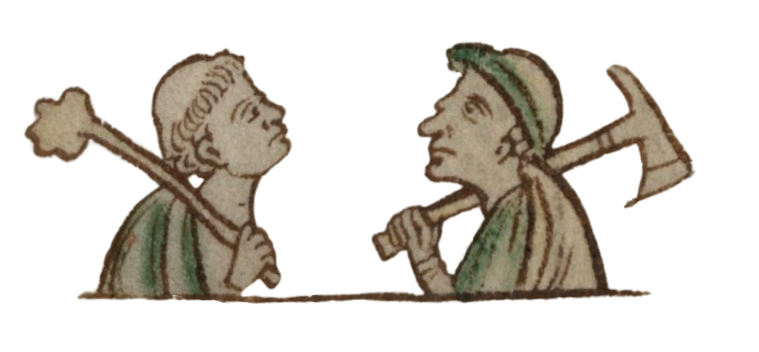
Matthew Paris' illustration of the 'gown' and 'town' at odds, from the Chronica Majora

The University of Paris strike of 1229 took place in Paris, France. The strike occurred as a disagreement over an unpaid tab at a local tavern. The ensuing disagreement caused the deaths of several students when Queen Blanche ordered the mercenary bodyguards to punish the student riot. The students protested with a "dispersion", or student strike; the masters suspended lectures. This lasted more than two years and led to several reforms in the medieval university when Pope Gregory IX issued the bull Parens scientiarum. The event demonstrates the town and gown power struggles with the Church, secular leaders, and the emerging student class and a lessening of local Church authority over the University of Paris. The university was placed squarely under direct papal patronage, part of the program to centralise the Church structure, which had intensified under Innocent III.

== Background ==
The University of Paris was one of the first universities in Europe and then considered the most prestigious of the time because of its focus on theology. The university's founding principles were defined by its teaching mission and scholasticism; these set off trends of city growth, democratic expansion, and the 12th-century intellectual renaissance. The university was established in the mid-12th century and received its official charter from the Church in 1200 recognising its legitimacy. The Church ran it, and students were considered part of the Church; they wore robes and shaved the tops of their heads in tonsure to signify they were under its protection. Students operated according to the rules and laws of the Church and were not subject to the king's laws or courts. That caused ongoing problems of students abusing the laws of the city, which had no direct recourse for justice and so had to appeal to ecclesiastical courts.

Students were often very young, entering the school at 13 or 14 and staying for 6 to 12 years. They came from many regions and spoke many European languages, with all defined by their native language. Latin was the lingua franca at school. Eventually, the Masters were organised into four "nations" comprising the French, the Picards, the Normans, and a polyglot of nationalities (predominantly English, Germans, Scandinavian, and otherwise Central European) referred to as "English". The overwhelming majority of students were from the elite or aristocratic classes of Europe, as the cost of travel and maintenance of a stay at the university, as well as basic tuition, was beyond the reach of the poor.

In 1200, a "town and gown" riot occurred where shortly after the provost of the city of Paris ordered a retaliation, killing several students. The group of masters at the university used this incident to acquire privileges from the king, Phillip Augustus, who feared the university would leave. Universities at this time were guilds of scholars who had no concrete setting or establishment of building, making relocating a simple move, which held great power.

== Riot ==
In March 1229, on Shrove Tuesday, Paris's pre-Lenten carnival was coming to its conclusion, similar to the modern-day Mardi Gras, when one wore masks and generally let loose. Presumably, intoxicated students wandered into a local tavern in the suburban quarter of Saint Marcel. After consuming some “sweet wine,” the students disputed the bill with the tavern owner, leading to a physical altercation. After the tavern owner called upon his ‘neighbors,’ the students were promptly beaten up and kicked out onto the street.

The next day, Ash Wednesday, the aggrieved students returned in larger numbers armed with wooden clubs; broke into the tavern, which was closed on account of the penitential holiday, beat the taverner and destroyed the establishment. Other shops were damaged in a subsequent riot, which spilled into the streets.

Because students had benefit of clergy, which exempted them from the jurisdiction of the king's courts, angry complaints were filed with the ecclesiastical (Church) courts. The ecclesiastical courts knew that the university tended to be very protective of its students, and fearing a split like that of Cambridge University from Oxford, they were trying to approach the matter carefully.

However, Blanche of Castile, regent of France during the minority of Louis IX, stepped in and demanded retribution. The university allowed the city guard to punish the student rioters. The city guardsmen, known for their rough nature, found a group of students and, with an unexpectedly heavy hand, killed several of them. The dead students were later rumoured to be innocent of the actual riot.

== Strike ==
The response from the university was an immediate strike beginning on 27 March 1229. Classes were closed, and striking students went to other universities such as Reims University, Oxford University, or University of Toulouse, returned home or found employment elsewhere. The masters ceased teachings and readings; they all went to the queen and legate and demanded justice. They believed general punishment for the whole was unjust, and only those who committed the act be punished. After the queen denied the request, the masters soon dissolved into surrounding universities. An economic strain was placed upon the student quarter of Paris, the Latin Quarter, where Latin was commonly heard in the streets. The university was a major component of the economy of Paris; generating prestige as well.

== Resolution ==
After two years of negotiations, Pope Gregory IX, an alumnus of the University of Paris, issued, on 13 April 1231, the bull Parens scientiarum, honouring the university as the "Mother of Sciences", which later was called the Magna Carta of the University of Paris because it guaranteed the school independence from local authority, both ecclesiastical and secular, by placing it directly under papal patronage. The document addresses the ‘riot’ as a random occurrence stemming from the devil's work. The Pope granted several freedoms to the university; start and end times of lectures, burying of the dead, content of lecture, and who could lecture. Pope Gregory IX, in the document, retained a strong grip on the university, minimising heresy, and strengthening theology. Several lines dismantled masters' attempts to be philosophers; telling them to be one of God's learned, and teach only from holy writings. The threat of suspension of lectures remained an economic lever and a tool of medieval universities when attempting to acquire rights. In the document, masters were authorised to "disperse" the lectures over a wide range of provocations, which ranged from "monstrous injury or offense" to "the right to assess the rents of lodgings".

== See also ==
- St Scholastica Day riot, Oxford University, 1355
- Revolt of 1173–1174 – Aristocracy revolt.
- William Fitz Osbert
- Authentica habita
- Benefit of clergy
