= John Trilleck =

14th-century Bishop of Hereford

- Bishop of Hereford
- Elected: 22 February 1344
- Term ended: 20 November 1360
- Predecessor: Thomas Charleton
- Successor: Lewis de Charleton

Orders
- Consecration: 29 August 1344

Personal details
- Died: 20 November 1360
- Denomination: Catholic

John Trilleck or Trillick (died 20 November 1360) was a medieval Bishop of Hereford.

Trilleck was the nephew of Adam Orleton, successively Bishop of Hereford, Worcester and Winchester and the elder brother of Thomas Trilleck, later Bishop of Rochester.

Trilleck was elected to the episcopate as Bishop of Hereford on 22 February 1344 and consecrated on 29 August 1344. He founded Trellick's Inn at Oxford as undergraduate quarters.

Trilleck died on 20 November 1360.

== Citations ==
Catholic Church titles
Preceded by Thomas Charleton	Bishop of Hereford; 1344–1360	Succeeded by Lewis de Charleton
