= Humphrey de Cherlton =

English churchman and university chancellor

Humphrey de Cherlton (or Humphrey de Charlton) was an English medieval churchman and university chancellor.

De Cherlton was a Doctor of Civil Law. Between 1354 and 1357, he was Chancellor of the University of Oxford. The St Scholastica Day riot of 10 February 1355, a clash between university students and townspeople killing 63 students and an estimated third of the local population, one of the most notorious events in the history of Oxford, occurred during this period. King Edward III, not pleased with the riot having occurred in England's esteemed town of Oxford, ordered an investigation, and the eventual findings favored the University.

Humphrey de Cherlton was also Canon of the Collegiate Church at Totenhale in the Diocese of Lichfield and Coventry, and a prebendary of York during 1361–83.

== Family ==
It is often speculated that Humphrey de Cherlton's brother, Lewis de Charleton, Bishop of Hereford, was Oxford's chancellor in 1357.

== Bibliography ==
- Wood, Anthony (1790). The History and Antiquities of the Colleges and Halls in the University of Oxford – via Internet Archive.

Academic offices
Preceded by William de Palmorna	Chancellor of the University of Oxford; 1354–1357	Succeeded by Lewis de Charleton? or John de Hotham
