= William de Hawkesworth =

English college head and university chancellor

William de Hawkesworth (died 8 April 1349) was an English medieval college head and university chancellor.

On 20 December 1348, William de Hawkesworth was confirmed as Provost of Oriel College, Oxford. In the same year he became Vice-Chancellor of the University of Oxford In 1349, he was briefly Chancellor of the University. He died on 8 April 1349 and there is a brass to him in the chancel of St Mary's Church, Oxford, describing him as "prepositus huius ecclesie" ("provost of the church").

John Wyllyot was elected Chancellor against the University statutes on 20 April 1349 and instead became Chancellor of Exeter.

Academic offices
Preceded by William de Leverton	Provosts of Oriel College, Oxford; 1348–1349	Succeeded by William de Daventre
Preceded by Hugh de Willoughby	Vice-Chancellor of the University of Oxford; 1348	Succeeded by ?
Preceded by John de Northwode	Chancellor of the University of Oxford; 1349	Succeeded by William de Palmorna
