= Richard Swinefield =

13th and 14th-century English Bishop of Hereford

- Bishop of Hereford
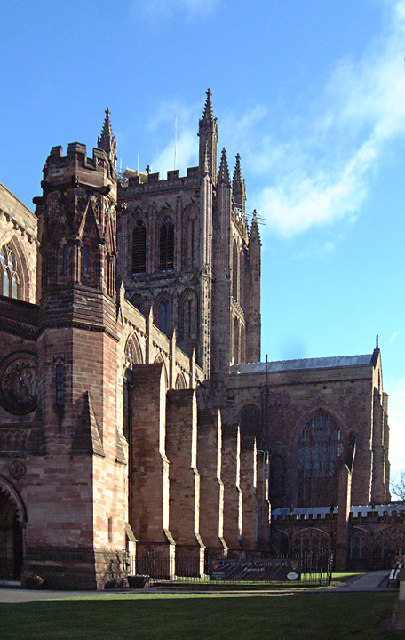
- Exterior view of Hereford Cathedral, where Richard Swinefield is buried.
- Elected: 1 October 1282
- Term ended: 15 March 1317
- Predecessor: Thomas de Cantilupe
- Successor: Adam Orleton
- Other post: Archdeacon of London

Orders
- Consecration: 7 March 1283

Personal details
- Died: 15 March 1317
- Buried: Hereford Cathedral

Richard Swinefield (or Richard de Swinfield; died 15 March 1317) was a medieval Bishop of Hereford, England. He graduated as a doctor of divinity before holding several ecclesiastical offices, including that of Archdeacon of London. As a bishop, he dedicated considerable efforts to securing the canonisation of Thomas de Cantilupe, his predecessor, for whom he had worked during his lifetime. Active in his diocese, he devoted little time to national political life. He was noted for his hostility to Jews and demanded their removal from Christian society, and ultimately, from England. He was buried in Hereford Cathedral, where his memorial still stands.

== Rise in the Church ==
Swinefield's last name may come from Swingfield located near Folkestone, Kent. His father was Stephen of Swinfield, who died in 1282, and his brother Stephen remained a layman. No other information about his family and upbringing, including his date of birth, has emerged. He held a doctor of divinity degree, but where he graduated is not known.

By 1264 Swinefield was a member of the household of Thomas de Cantilupe, later to be made Bishop of Hereford in 1275. By 1279 Swinefield held the prebend (Note: A prebend was a stipend derived from an estate owned by the cathedral.) of Hampton within the diocese, before 1279 and was to hold it until he became a bishop. In 1278–1280, he was administering the finances of Lincoln cathedral. Shortly after 17 April 1280 he was named Archdeacon of London, having previously held an unknown prebend in the diocese of London.

When Cantilupe was excommunicated by the Archbishop of Canterbury, John Peckham, Swinefield travelled to Rome on 26 January 1282 to plead his mentor's case to the Pope. Cantilupe died on the journey, and his remains were brought back to Hereford Cathedral by Swinefield.

== Episcopate ==
Swinefield was elected to the see of Hereford, or bishopric, on 1 October 1282. The election was confirmed by John Peckham, the Archbishop of Canterbury on 31 December 1282, and he entered into possession of the spiritualities and temporalities, or the ecclesiastical and lay income-producing properties, of the see by 8 January 1293. He was consecrated on 7 March 1283.

During Swinefield's time as bishop, he was not involved in national political life and spent most of his time in his diocese. He rarely attended Parliament, usually excusing himself on the grounds of urgent diocesan business or his own bad health. He inherited several lawsuits from his predecessor, which he managed to settle. He also resolved a dispute over the boundary between the diocese of Hereford and the Welsh diocese of St Asaph, to the advantage of Hereford.

Swinefield was concerned to ensure that his clergy were well treated. He worked to ensure that churches within his diocese were not misappropriated through the granting of custody to unworthy candidates, and was vigilant over monastic houses. In Swinefield's disagreements with the town of Hereford, he was little inclined to give way.

Many of Swinefield's disputes with the town appear to have involved relations between the Jewish and Christian populations of the town, which he did not directly control. (Note: As he was dependent on civil authorities to enforce punishments, he had to write to the King to enforce any restrictions. In his archive, 98 letters can be found requesting punishment of excommunicated Christians; however it is not recorded what the offences were for.)

Hearing of the Jew Aaron inviting prominent members of the city to a wedding, Swinefield wrote to his Hereford chancellor:

how great and how full of losses and perils is intercourse between Christians and Jews ... although Christian charity suffers patiently (these Jews) who are by their own fault condemned to perpetual servitude they scruple not to our contempt and insults on Christians. We have learned from sundry reports that on Wednesday after the feast of St. Bartholomew they (Aaron's family) have made preparations for a marriage feast … to which they have invited – not secretly but quite openly – some of our Christians in order to disparage the Christian faith of which they are the enemies and preach heresies to the simple people thus generating scandal by their intercourse. We therefore bid and enjoin on you … to make it known in all churches of the diocese that no Christian is to take part in festivities of this kind, under pain of canonical discipline.

Swinefield's orders were disobeyed, and local dignitaries attended the event. Swinefield threatened them with excommunication if they did not repent of their actions. It has been suggested that Swinefield's close correspondence with Rome over these events led to Honorius IV's Bull of November, which called on the Archbishop of Canterbury to ensure that anti-Jewish measures were properly enforced, especially those forbidding fraternisation between Jews and Christians.

Swinefield's main efforts, though, went toward securing the canonisation of his predecessor Thomas de Cantilupe beginning almost immediately after the latter's death in 1282. In January 1290, on a visit by Edward I to Hereford for this purpose, Swinefield helped persuade him to expel the Jews from England. Among the objects he is believed to have procured for Cantilupe's cult are the Hereford Mappa Mundi, which features anti-Semitic imagery. Some scholarship identifies scenes on the Mappa Mundi as an attempt to justify the Jewish expulsion.

Significant work on Hereford Cathedral took place while Swinefield was bishop. Work on the crossing tower dates from approximately 1307 onwards. A number of the works related to the use of the building for the cult of Thomas de Cantilupe, including the eastern transepts, Chancel aisles, and the North Porch, which features a number of figures that appear to relate to the cult, such as the female Synagoga, Luxuria and a bagpiper. The Synagogue figure shows a blindfolded Jew, whose two tablets are being dropped, in order to convey ignorance and a failure to uphold God's law.

Cantilupe's canonization did not take place until 1320, after Swinefield's death.

== Death and legacy ==
Swinefield died on 15 March 1317, and was buried in Hereford Cathedral, where a memorial in the transept's north wall depicts him in bishop's robes and holding a building. Two of his nephews were given offices within the diocese, with John given the precentorship in Hereford Cathedral, and Gilbert made the chancellor there. Another possible relative was Richard Swinfield, who also held a prebend in the diocese.

A record of Swinefield's expenses as bishop has survived for the years 1289 and 1290. The accounts offer a rare glimpse of the organisation and expenses of a major household during that period. During the 296 days covered by the record, his household moved 81 times, with 38 of these stops associated with him visiting his diocese from April through June. The record also shows that he supported two scholars at the University of Oxford. Several published editions of Swinefield's accounts have appeared, including by the Camden Society in 1853–1855. The editors noted, alternatively, Swinefield's "zealous" attitude towards the Jewry, or his "religious narrowness".

== Citations ==
Catholic Church titles
Preceded by Thomas de Cantilupe	Bishop of Hereford; 1282–1317	Succeeded by Adam Orleton
