= Thomas Charlton (bishop) =

14th-century Bishop of Hereford and Chancellor of England

- Bishop of Hereford
- Appointed: 25 September 1327
- Term ended: 11 January 1344
- Predecessor: Adam Orleton
- Successor: John Trilleck

Orders
- Consecration: 18 October 1327

Personal details
- Died: 11 January 1344
- Denomination: Catholic

Thomas Charlton (died 11 January 1344) was Bishop of Hereford, Lord High Treasurer of England, Lord Privy Seal, and Lord Chancellor of Ireland. He is buried in Hereford Cathedral in Hereford, Herefordshire, England.

== Family ==
Charlton was born near Wellington, Shropshire, younger son of Robert de Charleton of Apley, a small landowner. Thomas' eldest brother was John Charleton, 1st Baron Cherleton, who became a statesman of some importance after his marriage to Hawys Gadarn, heiress to the Lordship of Powys. Both brothers were in the household of Edward II, and Thomas received numerous ecclesiastical preferments.

The executors of his will were: Alan Cherleton, knight, John Cherleton, junior, knight; William de Sheynton, Richard de Sydenhale, Henry Shipton, Adam Esger and Alan Venyse.

== Appointments ==
Charlton was Lord Privy Seal from 1316 to 1320.

Charlton was nominated to be Bishop of Hereford on 25 September 1327 and consecrated on 18 October 1327.

== In Ireland ==
In 1337 his brother John was appointed Justiciar of Ireland, and Thomas accompanied him to Ireland as Lord Chancellor. He was charged by the English Crown to inquire into the perceived inadequacy and corruption of the Irish courts of common law and was authorised to remove the Irish judges and appoint English replacements. His mission does not seem to have been a success, as most of the existing judges, notably the notoriously corrupt Simon Fitz-Richard, the Chief Justice of the Irish Common Pleas, fought off all attempts to replace them. John resigned as justiciar in 1338, following a dispute, and Thomas moved from the Chancellorship to the position of custos rotulorum for Ireland.

Charlton was also Lord High Treasurer from 2 July 1328 until 16 September 1329.

== Citations ==
Political offices
Preceded by Roger Northburgh	Lord Privy Seal; 1316–1320	Succeeded by Robert Baldock
Preceded by Henry Burghersh	Lord High Treasurer; 1328–1329	Succeeded by Robert Wodehouse
Catholic Church titles
Preceded by Adam Orleton	Bishop of Hereford; 1327–1344	Succeeded by John Trilleck
