= Jeremy Catto =

British historian (1939–2018)

- Born: Robert Jeremy Adam Inch Catto; 27 July 1939; Newcastle upon Tyne, England
- Died: 17 August 2018 (aged 79)
- Occupations: Historian and academic
- Partner: John Wolfe (civil partnership)

Academic background
- Education: Royal Grammar School, Newcastle upon Tyne
- Alma mater: Balliol College, Oxford
- Thesis: William Woodford, O.F.M. (c.1330-c.1397) (1969)

Academic work
- Discipline: History
- Sub-discipline: Later Middle Ages; Political history; History of Christianity; History of education
- Institutions: Hatfield College, Durham; Oriel College, Oxford

Robert Jeremy Adam Inch Catto (27 July 1939 – 17 August 2018) was a British historian who was a Rhodes fellow and tutor in Modern History at Oriel College, Oxford between 1970 and 2006.

His research interests lay in the politics and religion of later medieval England. In a piece in The Spectator to commemorate his retirement in June 2006, Alan Duncan MP described him as "the quintessential Oxford don ... if one were to devour C. P. Snow, Goodbye, Mr. Chips and Porterhouse Blue, there is a smattering of Catto in each." He died of cancer on 17 August 2018 at the age of 79.

== Academic career ==
Catto was born on 27 July 1939 in Newcastle upon Tyne to Archibald and Grace Catto. His father was a businessman who operated a rubber plantation in British Malaya and his mother was a teacher; his uncle Thomas Catto was Governor of the Bank of England between 1944 and 1949.

Catto was educated at the Royal Grammar School, Newcastle upon Tyne before winning a Brackenbury Scholarship to study history at Balliol College, Oxford, where he graduated with first-class honours. He held a master's degree (M.A.) and a doctorate (D.Phil.) From 1964 to 1969 he was employed as a tutor at Hatfield College, Durham. During this time he became acquainted with Mark Lancaster and Bryan Ferry, who were then art students in nearby Newcastle.

At Oriel College, Catto held a variety of posts, including senior dean, vice provost, steward of the Senior Common Room and editor of the college Record. Within the Faculty of History he served as director of graduate studies, and he was also a senior librarian of the Oxford Union for 30 years.

== Personal life ==
Catto met his partner, John Wolfe, in 1961 in London. They remained together until Catto's death and entered into a civil partnership in 2017. After Catto's retirement in 2006 they lived together in Eydon, Northamptonshire, though he continued to visit Oxford several times a week. A Catholic since the age of 17, in retirement he became closely involved with his local church.

== Publications ==
- (ed. with T. A. R. Evans), The History of the University of Oxford Volume I: The Early Oxford Schools (28 June 1984) Clarendon Press
- (ed. with T. A. R. Evans), The History of the University of Oxford Volume II: Late Mediaeval Oxford (17 December 1992) Clarendon Press ISBN 0-19-951012-1
- "The King's Government and the Fall of Pecock 1457–58" in Rulers and Ruled in Late Mediaeval England (ed. R. E. Archer and Simon Walker), (Hambledon, 1995) pp. 201–222
- (ed. with L. Mooney), The Chronicle of John Somer, OFM (Camden Miscellany 34, 1997)
- 'Currents of religious thought and expression' in Cambridge Medieval History (ed. M. C. E. Jones), Vol 6 (Cambridge, 2000) pp. 42–65
- (ed.), Oriel College: A History Oxford University Press (2014) ISBN 0-19-959572-0
- 'Jeremy Catto - A Portrait of the Quintessential Oxford Don' published 2024 by Unicorn. Author David Vaiani. Foreword by Sir Alan Duncan. ISBN 978-1-916846-41-8
