= Medieval university =

Corporation organized during the Middle Ages for the purposes of higher education

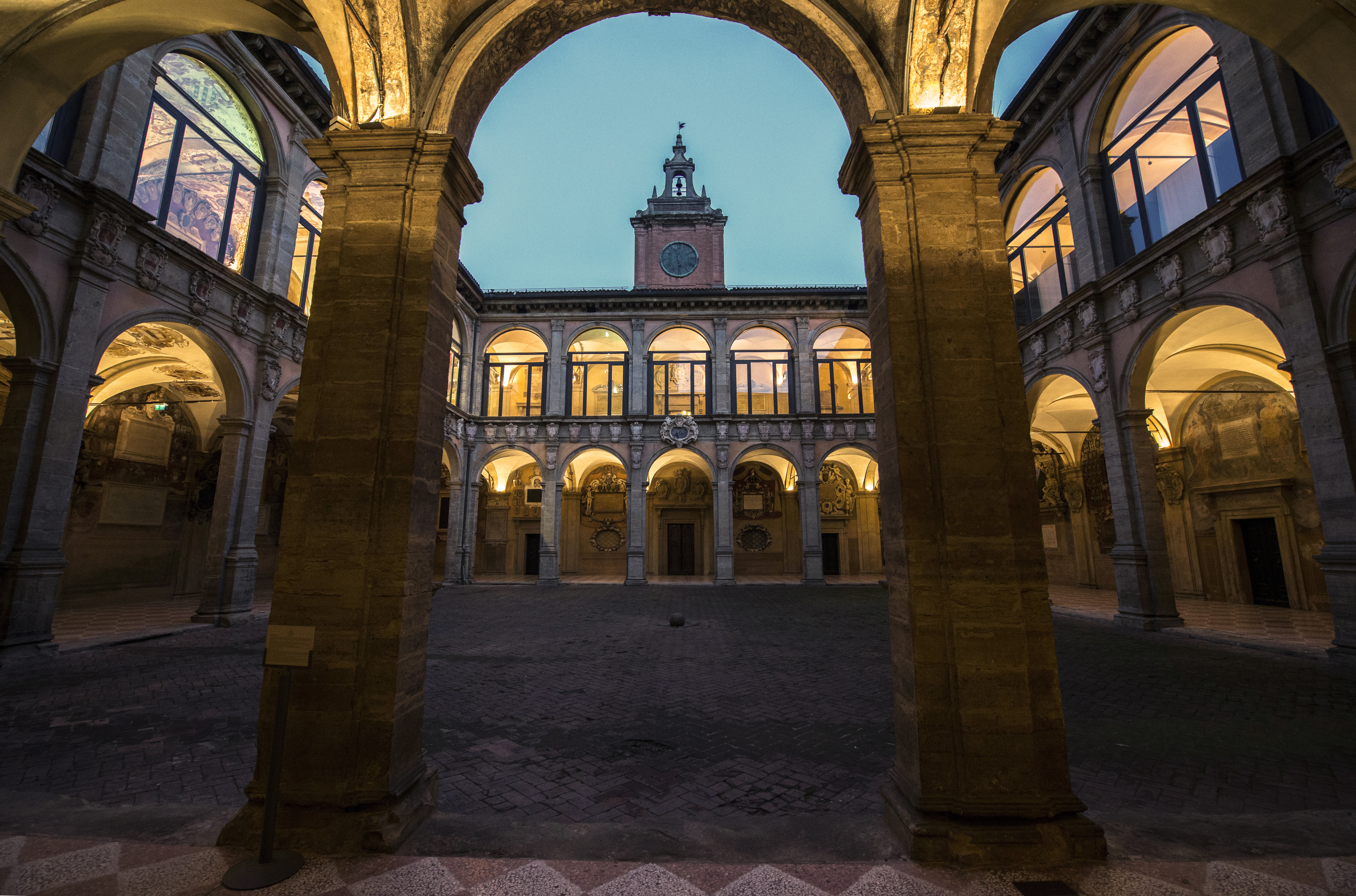
The University of Bologna, established in medieval Italy (1088), is the world's oldest university in continuous operation.

A medieval university was a corporation organized during the Middle Ages for the purposes of higher education. The first Western European institutions generally considered to be universities were established in present-day Italy, including the Kingdoms of Sicily and Naples, and the Kingdoms of England, France, Spain, Portugal, and Scotland between the 11th and 15th centuries for the study of the arts and the higher disciplines of theology, law, and medicine. These universities evolved from much older Christian cathedral schools and monastic schools, and it is difficult to define the exact date when they became true universities, though the lists of studia generalia for higher education in Europe held by the Vatican are a useful guide.

The word universitas originally applied only to the scholastic guilds—that is, the corporation of students and masters—within the studium, and it was always modified, as universitas magistrorum, universitas scholarium, or universitas magistrorum et scholarium. Eventually, probably in the late 14th century, the term began to appear by itself to exclusively mean a self-regulating community of teachers and scholars recognized and sanctioned by civil or ecclesiastical authority.

From the early modern period onward, this Western-style organizational form gradually spread from the medieval Latin West across the globe, eventually replacing all other higher-learning institutions and becoming the pre-eminent model for higher education everywhere.

== Antecedents ==
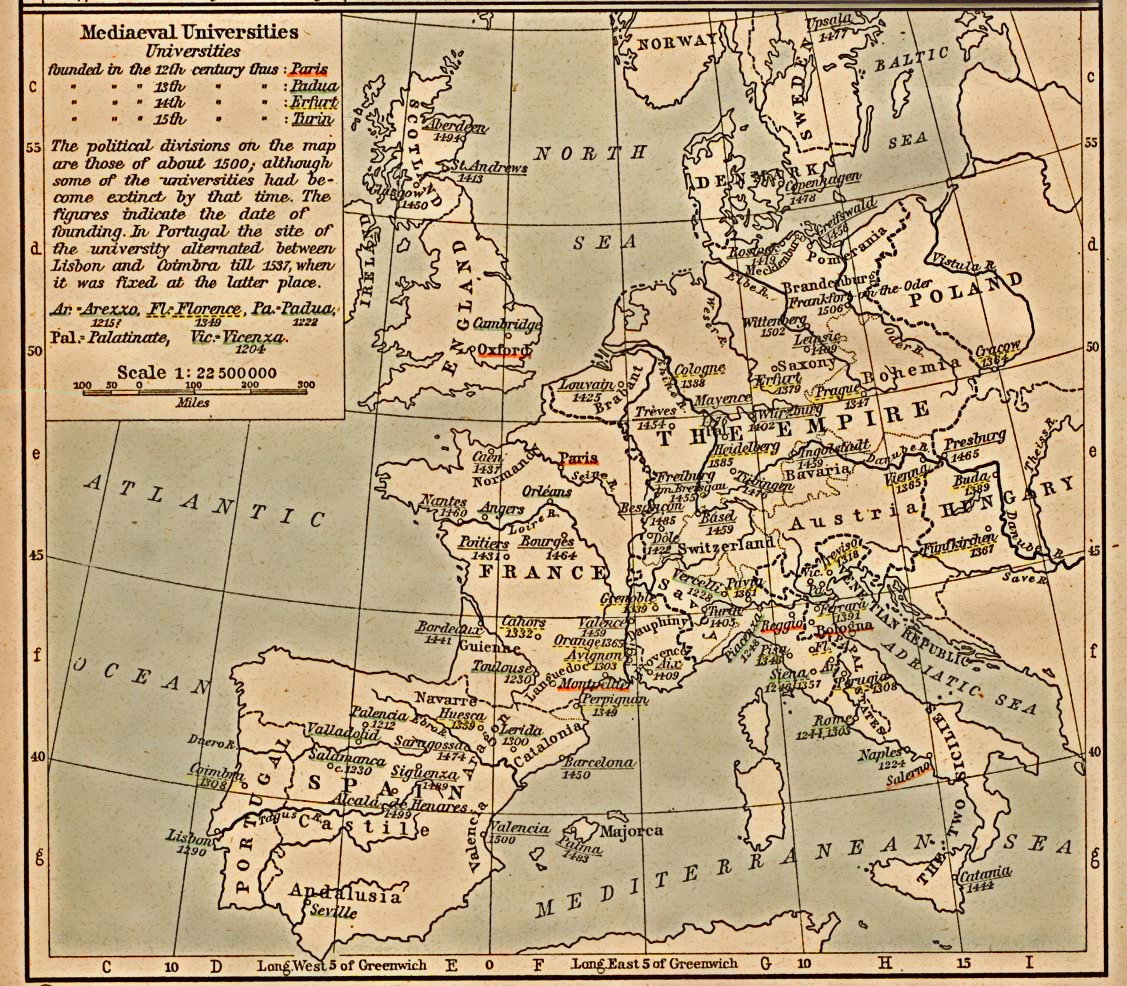
A map of medieval universities in Europe

The university is generally regarded as a formal institution that has its origin in the Medieval Christian setting in Europe. For hundreds of years prior to the establishment of universities, European higher education took place in Christian cathedral schools and monastic schools (scholae monasticae), where monks and nuns taught classes. Evidence of these immediate forerunners of the university at many places dates back to the 6th century AD.

With the increasing growth and urbanization of European society during the 12th and 13th centuries, a demand grew for professional clergy within the Catholic Church. Following the Gregorian Reform's emphasis on canon law and the study of the sacraments, the Catholic bishops formed cathedral schools to train their clergy in canon law, and also in the more secular aspects of religious administration, including logic and disputation for use in preaching and theological discussion, and accounting to control the Church's finances more effectively. Pope Gregory VII was critical in promoting and regulating the concept of modern university, as his 1079 Papal decree ordered the regulated establishment of cathedral schools that transformed themselves into the first European universities. Learning became essential to advancing in the ecclesiastical hierarchy, and teachers also gained prestige. Demand quickly outstripped the capacity of cathedral schools, each of which was essentially run by one schoolmaster. In addition, tensions rose between the students of cathedral schools and burghers in smaller towns. As a result, cathedral schools migrated to large cities, like Bologna, Rome, and Paris.

S. F. Alatas has noted some parallels between madrasas and early European colleges and has inferred that the first universities in Europe were influenced by the madrasas in Islamic Spain and the Emirate of Sicily. George Makdisi, Toby Huff and Norman Daniel, however, have questioned this, citing the lack of evidence for an actual transmission from the Islamic world to Christian Europe and highlighting the differences in the structure, methodologies, procedures, curricula and legal status of the "Islamic college" (madrasa) versus the European university.

== Establishment ==
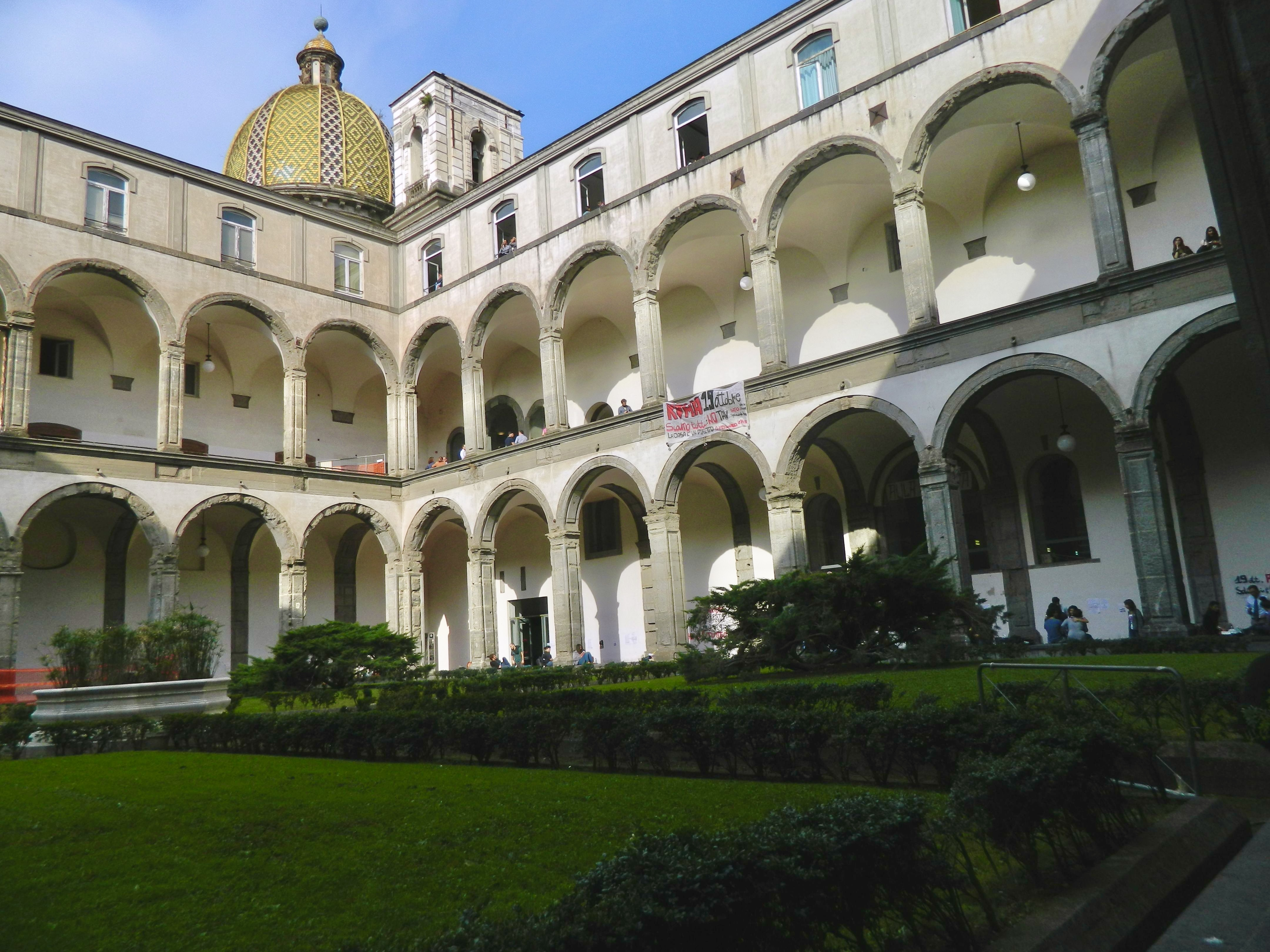
Established by the Holy Roman Emperor Frederick II in 1224, the University of Naples Federico II is the world's oldest state-funded university in continuous operation.

Hastings Rashdall set out the modern understanding of the medieval origins of European universities, noting that the earliest universities emerged spontaneously as "a scholastic Guild, whether of Masters or Students... without any express authorization of King, Pope, Prince or Prelate. They were spontaneous products of the instinct of association that swept over the towns of Europe in the course of the eleventh and twelfth centuries.

Among the earliest universities of this type were the University of Bologna (1088), University of Paris (c. 1150), University of Oxford (1167), University of Modena (1175), University of Palencia (1208), University of Cambridge (1209), University of Salamanca (1218), University of Montpellier (1220), University of Padua (1222), University of Naples (1224), University of Toulouse (1229), University of Orleans (1235), University of Siena (1240), University of Valladolid (1241) University of Northampton (1261), University of Coimbra (1288), University of Macerata (1290), University of Pisa (1343), Charles University in Prague (1348), University of Pavia (1361), Jagiellonian University (1364), University of Vienna (1365), University of Pécs (1367), Heidelberg University (1386), University of St Andrews (1413) and University of Catania (1434).

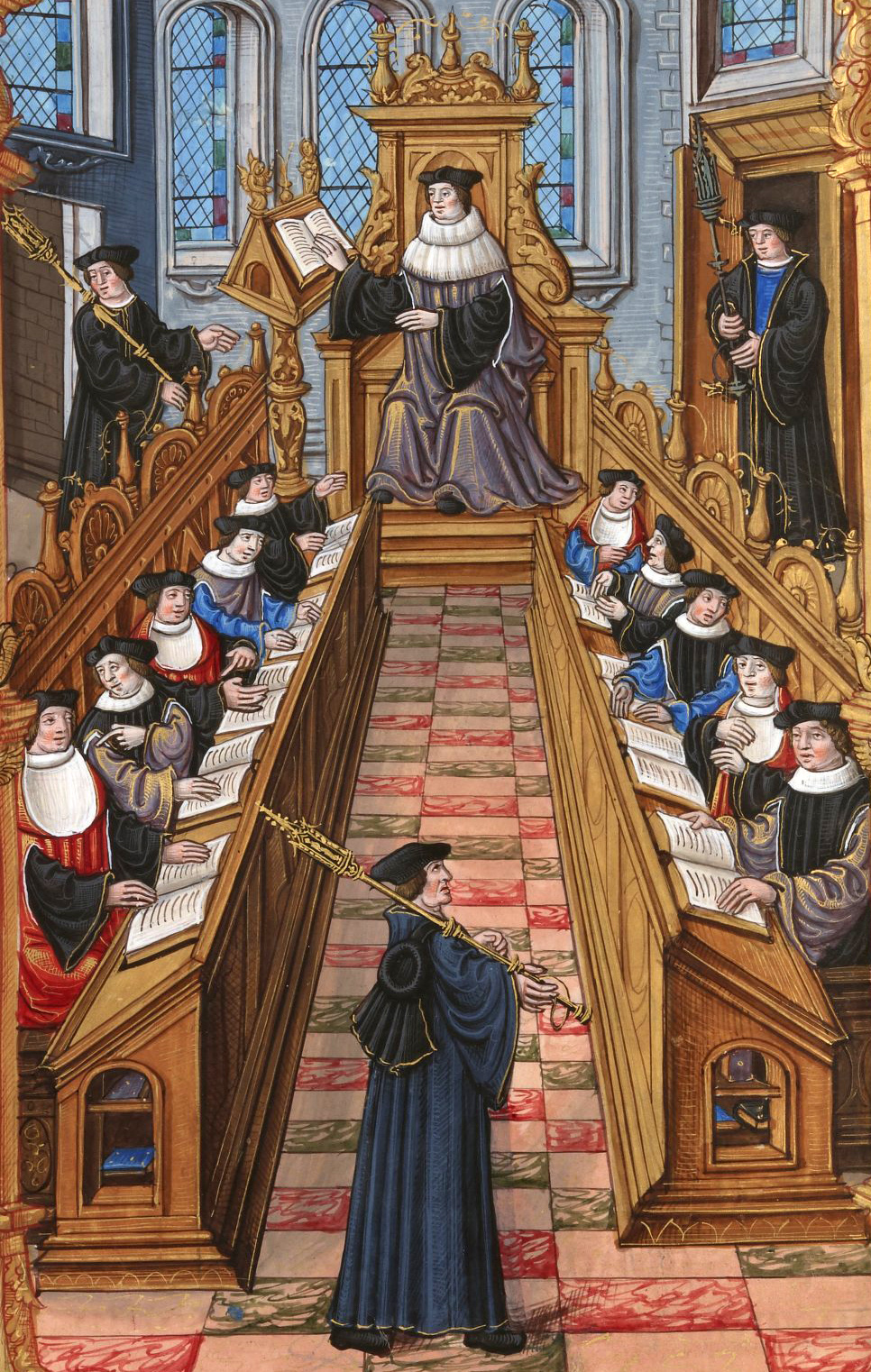
Illustration from a 16th-century manuscript showing a meeting of doctors at the University of Paris

In many cases universities petitioned secular power for privileges and this became a model. The Holy Roman Emperor Frederick I in Authentica Habita (1158) gave the first privileges to students in Bologna. Another step was Pope Alexander III in 1179 "forbidding masters of the church schools to take fees for granting the license to teach (licentia docendi), and obliging them to give license to properly qualified teachers". Rashdall considered that the integrity of a university was only preserved in such an internally regulated corporation, which protected the scholars from external intervention. This independently evolving organization was absent in the universities of southern Italy and Spain, which served the bureaucratic needs of monarchs—and were, according to Rashdall, their artificial creations.

The University of Paris was formally recognized when Pope Gregory IX issued the bull Parens scientiarum (1231). This was a revolutionary step: studium generale (university) and universitas (corporation of students or teachers) existed even before, but after the issuing of the bull, they attained autonomy. "[T]he papal bull of 1233, which stipulated that anyone admitted as a teacher in Toulouse had the right to teach everywhere without further examinations (ius ubique docendi), in time, transformed this privilege into the single most important defining characteristic of the university and made it the symbol of its institutional autonomy .... By the year 1292, even the two oldest universities, Bologna and Paris, felt the need to seek similar bulls from Pope Nicholas IV".

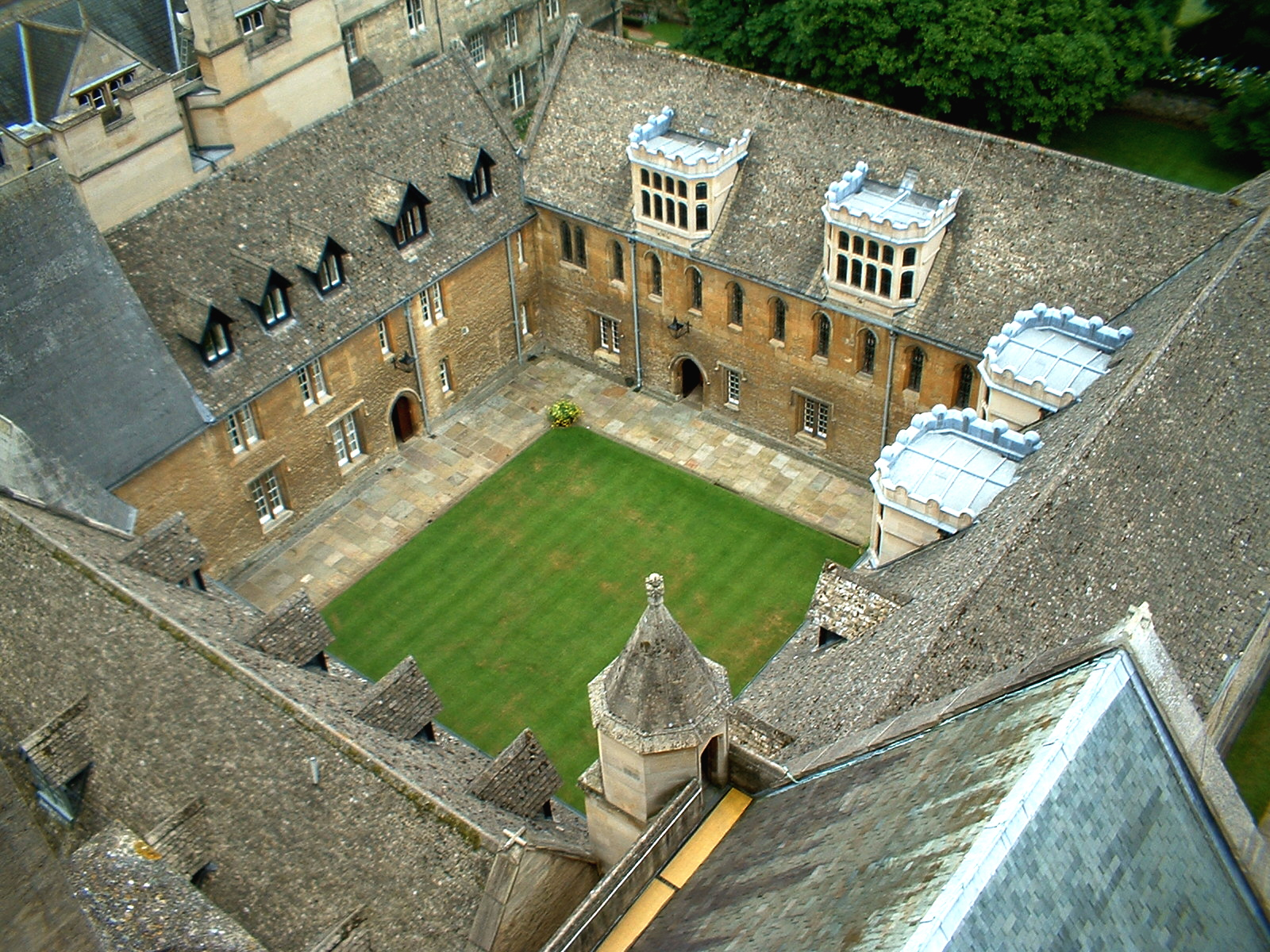
This Mob Quad group of buildings in Merton College, Oxford was constructed in three phases and concluded in c. 1378

By the 13th century, almost half of the highest offices in the Church were occupied by degree masters (abbots, archbishops, cardinals), and over one-third of the second-highest offices were occupied by masters. In addition, some of the greatest theologians of the High Middle Ages, Thomas Aquinas and Robert Grosseteste, were products of the medieval university.

The development of the medieval university coincided with the widespread reintroduction of Aristotle from Byzantine and Arab scholars. In fact, the European university put Aristotelian and other natural science texts at the center of its curriculum, with the result that the "medieval university laid far greater emphasis on science than does its modern counterpart and descendent".

Although it has been assumed that the universities went into decline during the Renaissance due to the scholastic and Aristotelian emphasis of its curriculum being less popular than the cultural studies of Renaissance humanism, Toby Huff has noted the continued importance of the European universities, with their focus on Aristotle and other scientific and philosophical texts into the early modern period, arguing that they played a crucial role in the Scientific Revolution of the 16th and 17th centuries. As he puts it "Copernicus, Galileo, Tycho Brahe, Kepler, and Newton were all extraordinary products of the apparently Procrustean and allegedly Scholastic universities of Europe... Sociological and historical accounts of the role of the university as an institutional locus for science and as an incubator of scientific thought and arguments have been vastly understated".

== Characteristics ==
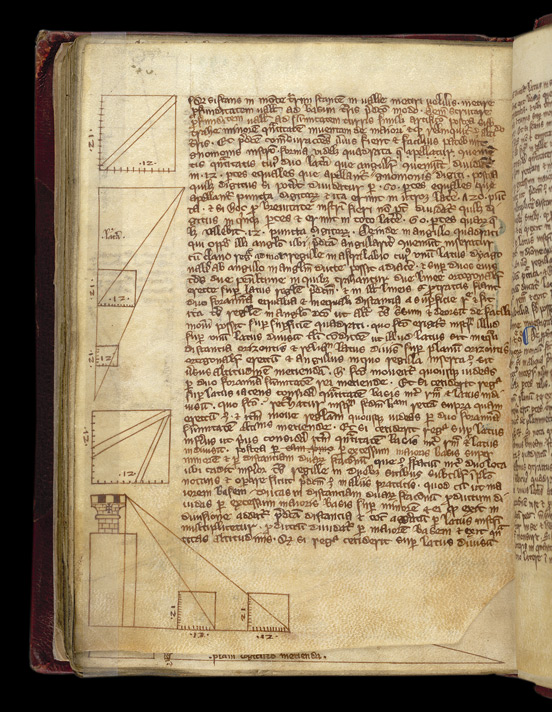
Diagrams, in a volume of treatises on natural science, philosophy, and mathematics. This 1300 manuscript is typical of the sort of book owned by medieval university students.

Initially medieval universities did not have physical facilities such as the campus of a modern university. Classes were taught wherever space was available, such as churches and homes. A university was not a physical space but a collection of individuals banded together as a universitas. Soon, however, universities began to rent, buy or construct buildings specifically for the purposes of teaching.

Universities were generally structured along three types, depending on who paid the teachers. The first type was in Bologna, where students hired and paid for the teachers. The second type was in Paris, where teachers were paid by the church. Oxford and Cambridge were predominantly supported by the crown and the state, which helped them survive the Dissolution of the Monasteries in 1538 and the subsequent removal of all principal Catholic institutions in England. These structural differences created other characteristics. At the Bologna university the students ran everything—a fact that often put teachers under great pressure and disadvantage. In Paris, teachers ran the school; thus Paris became the premiere spot for teachers from all over Europe. Also, in Paris the main subject matter was theology, so control of the qualifications awarded was in the hands of an external authority – the chancellor of the diocese. In Bologna, where students chose more secular studies, the main subject was law.

It was also characteristic of teachers and scholars to move around. Universities often competed to secure the best and most popular teachers, leading to the marketisation of teaching. Universities published their list of scholars to entice students to study at their institution. Students of Peter Abelard followed him to Melun, Corbeil, and Paris, showing that popular teachers brought students with them.

== Students ==
Students attended the medieval university at different ages—from 14 if they were attending Oxford or Paris to study the arts, to their 30s if they were studying law in Bologna. During this period of study, students often lived far from home and unsupervised, and as such developed a reputation, both among contemporary commentators and modern historians, for drunken debauchery. Students are frequently criticized in the Middle Ages for neglecting their studies for drinking, gambling and sleeping with prostitutes. In Bologna, some of their laws permitted students to be citizens of the city if they were enrolled at a university.

=== Course of study ===
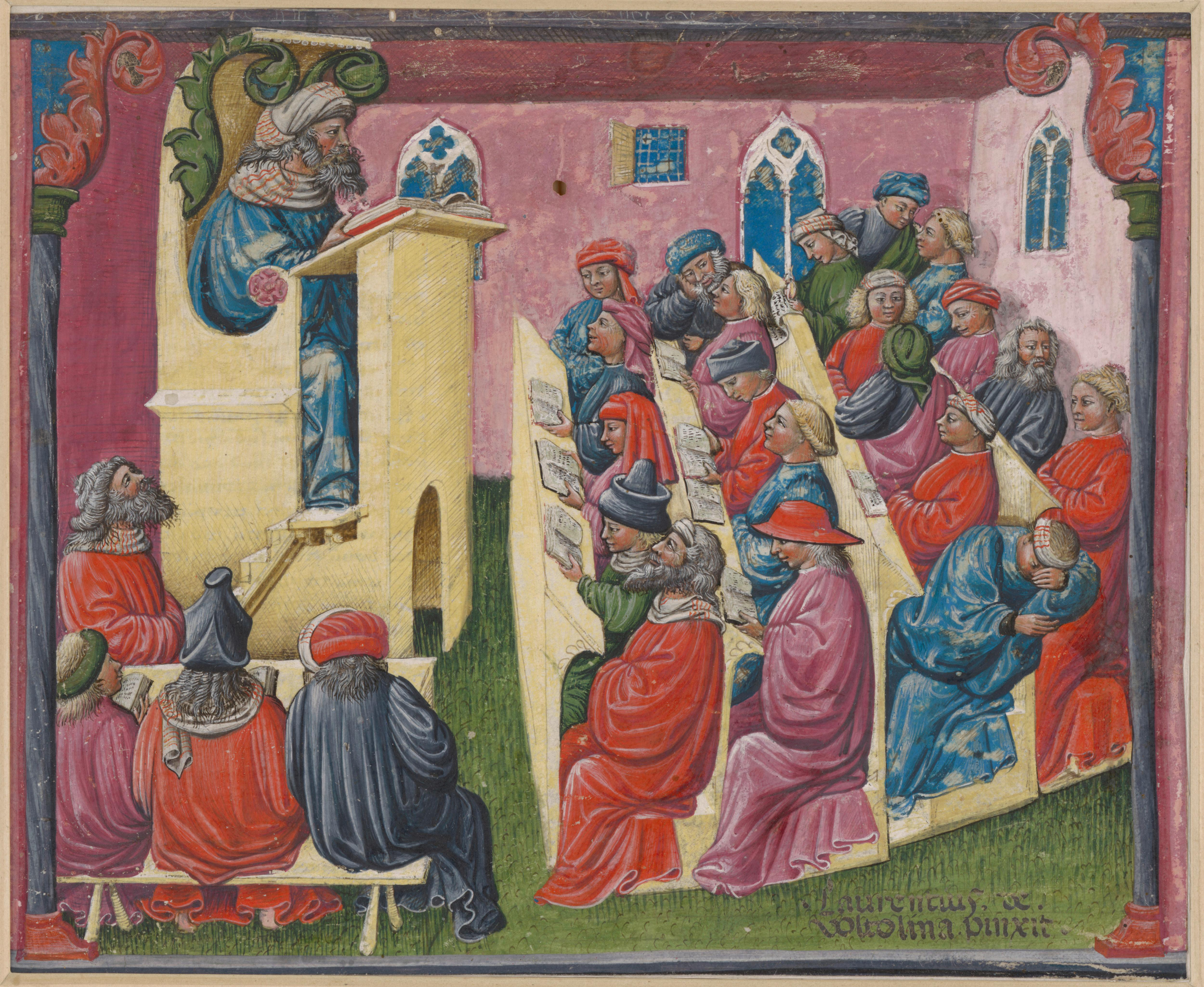
A Bologna university class,1350s

University studies took six years for a Master of Arts degree (a Bachelor of Arts degree was awarded after completing the third or fourth year). Studies for this were organized by the faculty of arts, where the seven liberal arts were taught: arithmetic, geometry, astronomy, music theory, grammar, logic, and rhetoric. All instruction was given in Latin and students were expected to converse in that language. The trivium comprised the three subjects that were taught first: grammar, logic, and rhetoric. The quadrivium consisted of arithmetic, geometry, music, and astronomy. The quadrivium was taught after the preparatory work of the trivium and would lead to the degree of Master of Arts. The curriculum came also to include the three Aristotelian philosophies: physics, metaphysics and moral philosophy.

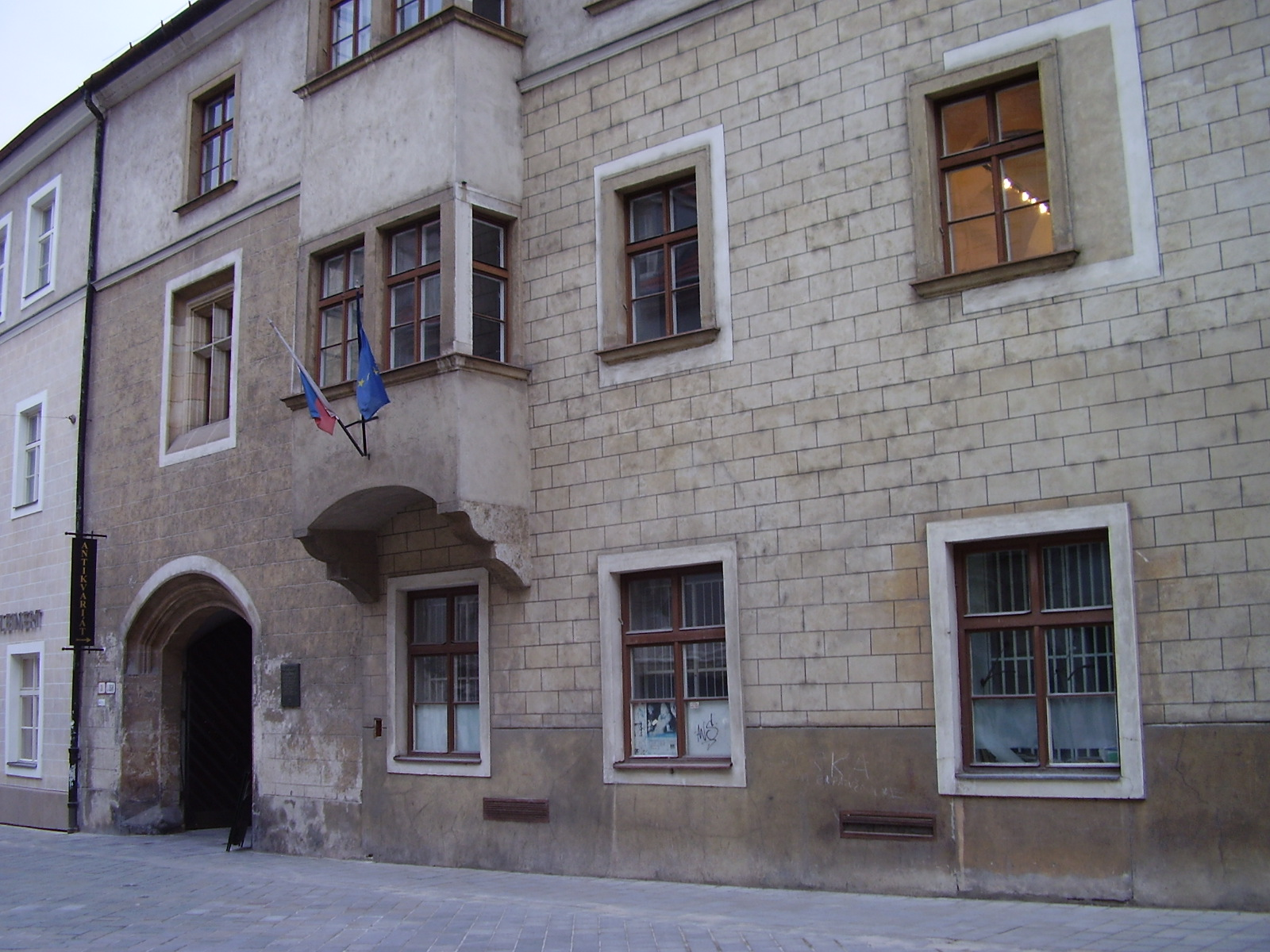
Universitas Istropolitana, a former university building in present-day Bratislava, Slovakia

Much of medieval thought in philosophy and theology can be found in scholastic textual commentary because scholasticism was such a popular method of teaching. Aelius Donatus' Ars grammatica was the standard textbook for grammar; also studied were the works of Priscian and Graecismus by Eberhard of Béthune. Cicero's works were used for the study of rhetoric. Studied books on logic included Porphyry's introduction to Aristotelian logic, Gilbert de la Porrée's De sex principiis and Summulae Logicales by Petrus Hispanus (later Pope John XXI). The standard work of astronomy was Tractatus de sphaera.

Once a Master of Arts degree had been conferred, the student could leave the university or pursue further studies in one of the higher faculties, law, medicine, or theology, the last one being the most prestigious. Originally, only few universities had a faculty of theology, because the popes wanted to control the theological studies. Until the mid-14th century, theology could be studied only at universities in Paris, Oxford, Cambridge and Rome. First the establishment of the University of Prague (1347) ended their monopoly and afterwards also other universities got the right to establish theological faculties.

A popular textbook for theological study was called the Sentences (Quattuor libri sententiarum) of Peter Lombard; theology students as well as masters were required to lecture or to write extensive commentaries on this text as part of their curriculum. Studies in the higher faculties could take up to twelve years for a master's degree or doctorate (initially the two were synonymous), though again a bachelor's and a licentiate's degree could be awarded along the way.

Courses were offered according to books, not by subject or theme. For example, a course might be on a book by Aristotle, or a book from the Bible. Courses were not elective: the course offerings were set, and everyone had to take the same courses. There were, however, occasional choices as to which teacher to use.

Students often entered the university at fourteen to fifteen years of age, though many were older. Classes usually started at 5:00 or 6:00 a.m.

=== Legal status ===
As students had the legal status of clerics, Canon Law prohibited women from being admitted into universities. Students were afforded the legal protection of the clergy, as well. In this way, no one was allowed to physically harm them; they could only be tried for crimes in an ecclesiastical court, and were thus immune from any corporal punishment. This gave students free rein in urban environments to break secular laws with impunity, which led to many abuses: theft, rape, and murder. Students did not face serious consequences from the law. Students were also known to engage in drunkenness. Sometimes citizens were forbidden to interact with students because they made accusations against the university.

This led to uneasy tensions with secular authorities—the demarcation between town and gown. Masters and students would sometimes "strike" by leaving a city and not returning for years. This happened at the University of Paris strike of 1229 after a riot left a number of students dead. The university went on strike and they did not return for two years.

Most universities in Europe were recognized by the Holy See as studia generalia, testified by a papal bull. Members of these institutions were encouraged to disseminate their knowledge across Europe, often lecturing at a different studium generale. Indeed, one of the privileges the papal bull confirmed was the right to confer the ius ubique docendi, an entitlement to teach everywhere.

== See also ==
- Ancient higher-learning institutions
- Ancient universities in the UK
- Ancient universities of Scotland
- List of oldest universities in continuous operation
- Nation (university)
- Renaissance of the 12th century

== Bibliography ==
- Cobban, Alan B. English University Life in the Middle Ages Columbus: Ohio State University Press, 1999. ISBN 0-8142-0826-6
- De Ridder-Symoens, Hilde (ed.): A History of the University in Europe. Vol. I: Universities in the Middle Ages, Cambridge University Press, 1992, ISBN 0-521-36105-2
- Dunphy, Graeme (2015). "The Medieval University". In Classen, Albrecht (ed.). Handbook of Medieval Culture. Vol. 1. Berlin & New York: Walter de Gruyter. pp. 1706–1734. ISBN 9783110267303.
- Ferruolo, Stephen: The Origins of the University: The Schools of Paris and their Critics, 1100-1215 Stanford: Stanford University Press, 1998. ISBN 0-8047-1266-2
- Haskins, Charles Homer: The Rise of Universities. Ithaca, New York: Cornell University Press, 1972. ISBN 0-87968-379-1
- Lee, John S., and Steer, Christian (eds.), Commemoration in Medieval Cambridge History of the University of Cambridge, Boydell, 2018. ISBN 9781783273348
- Pedersen, Olaf, The First Universities: Studium Generale and the Origins of University Education in Europe, Cambridge University Press, 1997.
- Rait, Robert S.: Life in the Medieval University, Cambridge University Press, [1912] 1931, ISBN 0-527-73650-3
- Rashdall, Hastings; revd. by Powicke, F. M., and Emden, A. B.: The Universities of Europe in the Middle Ages, 3 vols. Oxford: Clarendon Press, [1895] 1987, ISBN 0-19-821431-6
- Seybolt, Robert Francis (trans.): The Manuale Scholarium: An Original Account of Life in the Mediaeval University, Cambridge: Harvard University Press, 1921
- Thorndike, Lynn (trans. and ed.): University Records and Life in the Middle Ages, New York: Columbia University Press, 1975, ISBN 0-393-09216-X
- Verger, Jacques (1999). "Universität". Lexikon des Mittelalters. Vol. 8. Stuttgart: J.B. Metzler. cols:1249–1255.
