= Authentica habita =

Ancient university document

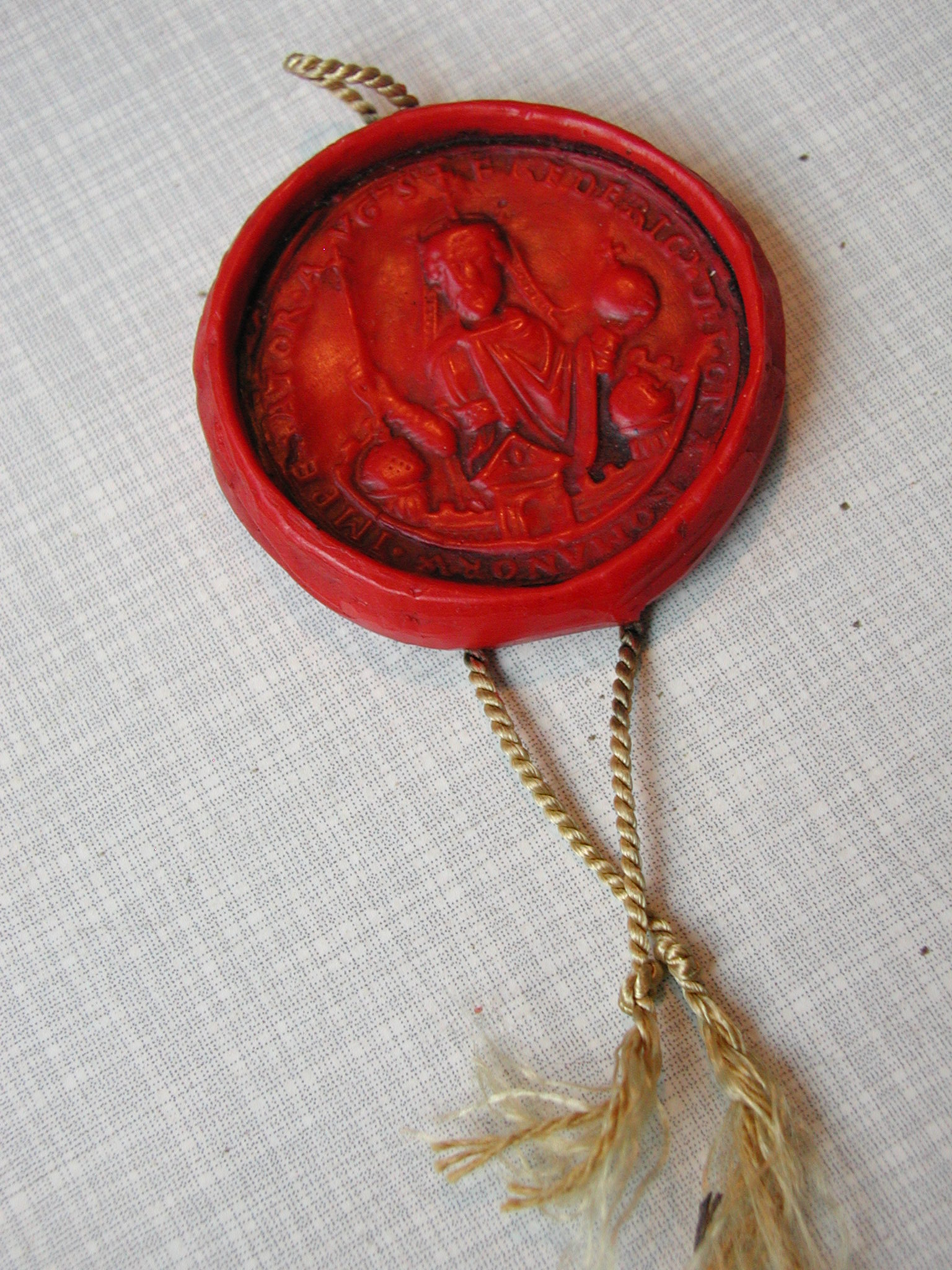
Wax seal of Frederick I Barbarossa

Authentica habita, or Privilegium Scholasticum, was a document written in c. 1155 by the Emperor Frederick I Barbarossa. In it, he set out for the first time some of the rules, rights and privileges of students and scholars. It is an important precursor to the formation of medieval universities in Europe.

Scholars from all over Europe had begun to travel to Bologna to study civil and canon law, and newly rediscovered works of Roman law, from the mid-11th century. As foreigners there, they found themselves without legal protection. A particular difficulty was the practice of the Right of Reprisal, where their property could be seized on foot of debts incurred by their countrymen.

The document grants several rights and protections to scholars, including:

1. Similar immunities and freedoms as those held by the clergy, provided they conformed to certain attributes, such as clerical dress
2. Freedom of movement and travel for the purposes of study
3. Immunity from the right of reprisal
4. The right to be tried by their masters, or the Bishops court, rather than local civil courts

The document was subsequently confirmed by Pope Alexander III. The emperor incorporated the document into Justinian's Codex, the extant body of Roman law, indicating its significance.

One medieval commentary to the document exists, written by Bartolomeo Bolognini in 1492. See also Pearl Kibre's "Scholarly privileges in the Middle Ages".

== See also ==
- Benefit of clergy
- University of Paris strike of 1229
- Clerici vagantes
- Academic mobility
