= Wells Cathedral =

Anglican cathedral in Somerset, England

- Cathedral Church of St Andrew
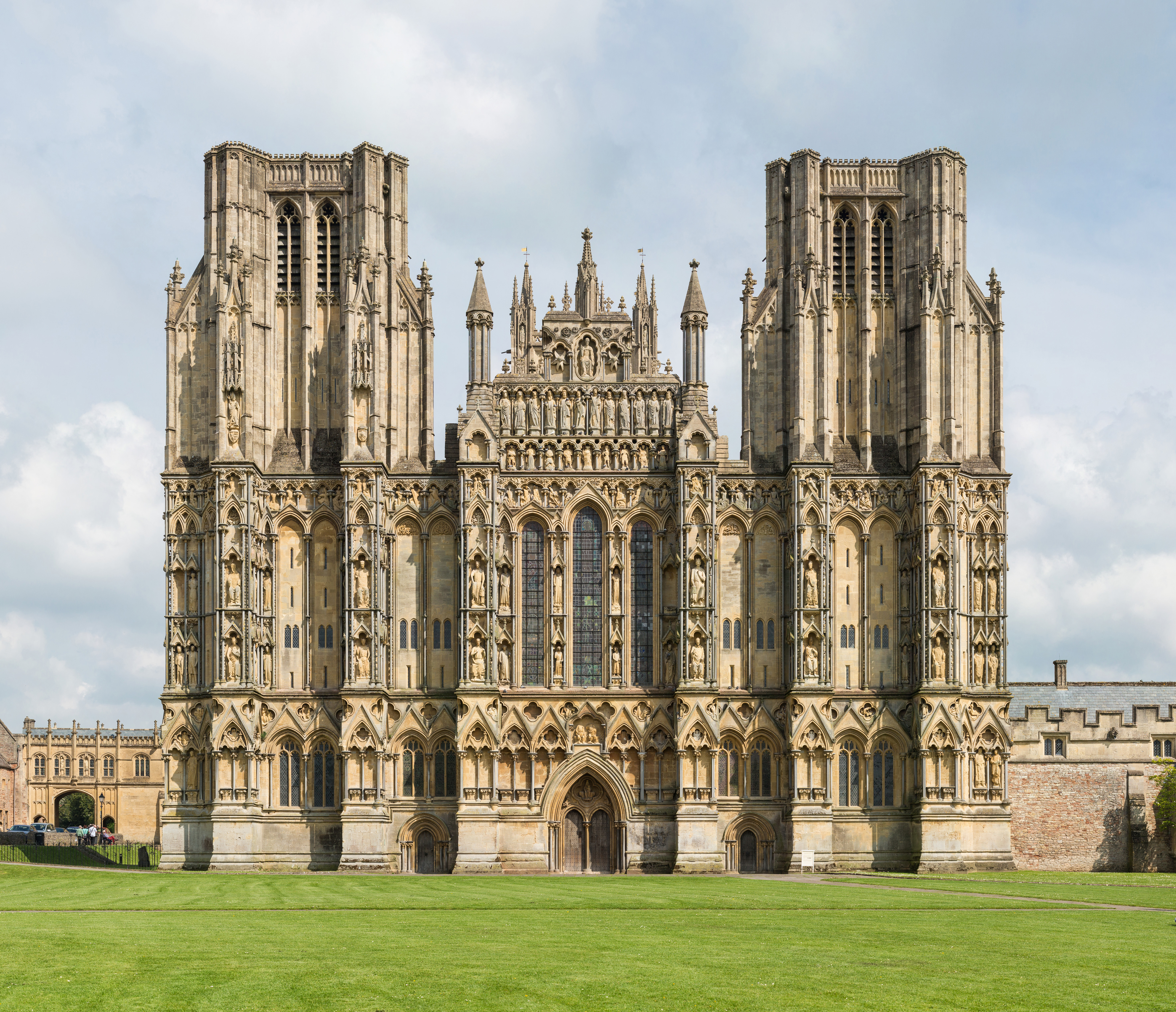
- West front of Wells Cathedral
- Wells Cathedral
- 51.2104°N 2.6437°W
- OS grid reference: ST 55148 45885
- Location: Wells, Somerset
- Country: England
- Denomination: Church of England
- Previous denomination: Roman Catholic
- Website: wellscathedral.org.uk

History
- Dedication: Saint Andrew
- Consecrated: 23 October 1239

Architecture
- Heritage designation: Grade I listed building
- Designated: 12 November 1953
- Style: Gothic (Early English, Decorated, and Perpendicular)
- Years built: 1176 – c. 1490

Specifications
- Length: 126.5 m (415 ft)
- Width: 20 m (66 ft)
- Height: 38 m (125 ft) (western); 55 m (180 ft) (crossing)

Administration
- Province: Canterbury
- Diocese: Bath and Wells

Clergy
- Bishop: Michael Beasley
- Dean: Toby Wright

Wells Cathedral, formally the Cathedral Church of St Andrew, is a Church of England cathedral in Wells, Somerset, England. It is the seat of the bishop of Bath and Wells and the mother church of the diocese of Bath and Wells. There are daily Church of England services in the building, and in 2023 it was reported to receive over 300,000 visitors per year. The cathedral is a Grade I listed building. The cathedral precincts contain the Bishop's Palace and several buildings linked to its medieval chapter of secular canons, including the fifteenth-century Vicars' Close.

The earliest record of a church on the present site is a charter of 766. A bishopric was established in 909; however in 1090 the cathedral of the diocese was moved to Bath Abbey and remained there until Wells became co-cathedral in 1218. The remains of the tenth-century cathedral lie to the south of the present building, beneath the cloister. The present cathedral has a cruciform plan with a chapter house attached to the north and a cloister to the south, and is largely the result of two building campaigns which took place between c. 1180 to c. 1260 and c. 1285 to c. 1345. The western half of the cathedral, including the nave and western transepts, belongs primarily to the first building phase and is constructed in the Early English style of Gothic architecture. The east end, including the lady chapel, eastern transepts, chapter house, and central tower, belongs to the second phase and uses the Decorated Gothic style and retains much medieval stained glass. Two towers were added to the west front between 1385 and 1410 in the Perpendicular Gothic style, and the cloisters were remodelled in the same style between 1420 and 1508. The cathedral was restored over the course of the nineteenth and early twentieth centuries.

Wells has been called "unquestionably one of the most beautiful" and "most poetic" of English cathedrals. The architectural historian John Harvey sees it as Europe's first truly Gothic structure, breaking from the last constraints of the Romanesque style. The west front, which contains 300 sculpted figures, has been described by Harvey as the "supreme triumph of the combined plastic arts in England"; however the architectural historian Nikolaus Pevsner described it as "spare", with "harsh uprights and horizontals [...] like steel scaffolding".

== History ==
=== Early years ===
The earliest remains of a building on the site are of a late-Roman mausoleum, identified during excavations in 1980. An abbey church was built in Wells in 705 by Aldhelm, first bishop of the newly established Diocese of Sherborne during the reign of King Ine of Wessex. It was dedicated to St Andrew and stood at the site of the cathedral's cloisters, where some excavated remains can be seen. There is a modern commemoration stone to King Ine set in the floor of the Cathedral between the nave and the transept. The font in the cathedral's south transept is from this church and is the oldest part of the present building. In 766 Cynewulf, King of Wessex, signed a charter endowing the church with eleven hides of land. (Note: A hide of land was a unit of land sufficient to support a family. Considered as a fiscal unit, the use of the hide in the Domesday Book shows that it was variable from county to county, but generally about 120 "acres" (not 120 acres each of 4840 square yards, but 120 times what a team of eight oxen could plough in a single day).) In 909 the seat of the diocese was moved from Sherborne to Wells.

The first bishop of Wells was Athelm (909), who crowned King Æthelstan. Athelm and his nephew Dunstan both became Archbishops of Canterbury. During this period a choir of boys was established to sing the liturgy. Wells Cathedral School, which was established to educate these choirboys, dates its foundation to this point. There is, however, some controversy over this. Following the Norman Conquest, John de Villula moved the seat of the bishop from Wells to Bath in 1090. The church at Wells, no longer a cathedral, had a college of secular clergy.

=== Seat of the bishop ===
The cathedral is thought to have been conceived and commenced in about 1175 by Reginald Fitz Jocelin, who died in 1191. Although it is clear from its size that from the outset, the church was planned to be the cathedral of the diocese, the seat of the bishop moved between Wells and the abbeys of Glastonbury and Bath, before settling at Wells. In 1197 Reginald's successor, Savaric FitzGeldewin, with the approval of Pope Celestine III, officially moved his seat to Glastonbury Abbey. The title of Bishop of Bath and Glastonbury was used until the Glastonbury claim was abandoned in 1219.

Savaric's successor, Jocelin of Wells, again moved the bishop's seat to Bath Abbey, with the title Bishop of Bath. Jocelin was a brother of Hugh (II) of Lincoln and was present at the signing of Magna Carta. Jocelin continued the building campaign begun by Reginald and was responsible for the Bishop's Palace, the choristers' school, a grammar school, a hospital for travellers and a chapel. He also had a manor house built at Wookey, near Wells. Jocelin saw the church dedicated in 1239 but, despite much lobbying of the Pope by Jocelin's representatives in Rome, he did not live to see cathedral status granted. The delay may have been a result of inaction by Pandulf Verraccio, a Roman ecclesiastical politician, papal legate to England and Bishop of Norwich, who was asked by the Pope to investigate the situation but did not respond. Jocelin died at Wells on 19 November 1242 and was buried in the choir of the cathedral; the memorial brass on his tomb is one of the earliest brasses in England. Following his death the monks of Bath unsuccessfully attempted to regain authority over Wells.

In 1245 the ongoing dispute over the title of the bishop was resolved by a ruling of Pope Innocent IV, who established the title as the "Bishop of Bath and Wells", which it has remained until this day, with Wells as the principal seat of the bishop. Since the 11th century the church has had a chapter of secular clergy, like the cathedrals of Chichester, Hereford, Lincoln and York. The chapter was endowed with 22 prebends (lands from which finance was drawn) and a provost to manage them. On acquiring cathedral status, in common with other such cathedrals, it had four chief clergy, the dean, precentor, chancellor and sacristan, who were responsible for the spiritual and material care of the cathedral.

Wells Cathedral and its environs

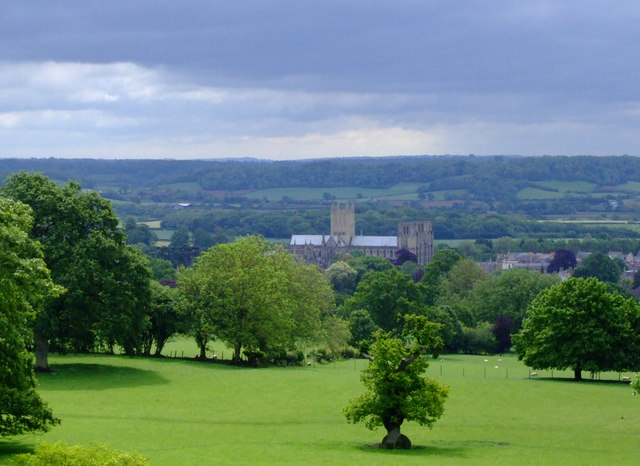
Wells Cathedral in the Somerset countryside

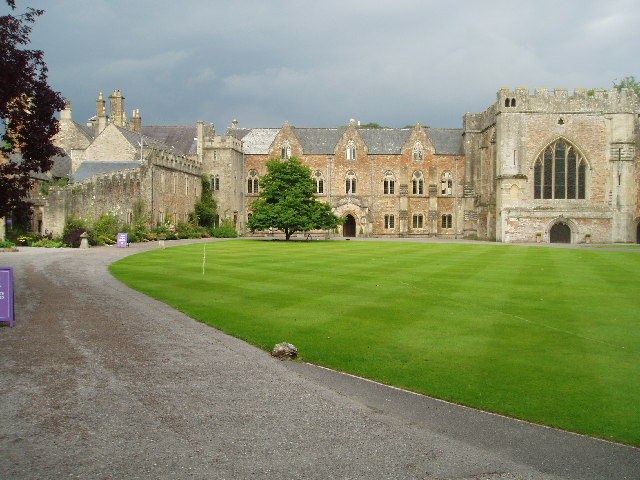
The Bishop's Palace built by Ralph of Shrewsbury

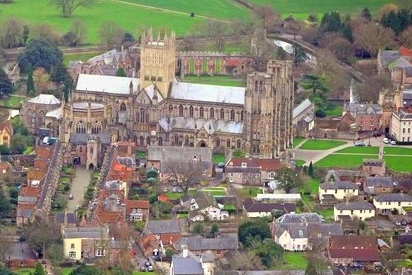
Aerial view of the cathedral and the Vicars' Close (lower left of picture)

=== Building the cathedral ===
The building programme, begun by Reginald Fitz Jocelin, bishop in the 12th century, continued under Jocelin of Wells, who was a canon from 1200, then bishop from 1206. Adam Locke was master mason from about 1192 until 1230. It was designed in the new style with pointed arches, later known as Gothic, which was introduced at about the same time at Canterbury Cathedral. Work was halted between 1209 and 1213 when King John was excommunicated and Jocelin was in exile, but the main parts of the church were complete by the time of the dedication by Jocelin in 1239.

By the time the cathedral, including the chapter house, was finished in 1306, it was already too small for the developing liturgy, and unable to accommodate increasingly grand processions of clergy. John Droxford initiated another phase of building under master mason Thomas of Whitney, during which the central tower was heightened and an eight-sided Lady chapel was added at the east end by 1326. Ralph of Shrewsbury followed, continuing the eastward extension of the choir and retrochoir beyond. He oversaw the building of Vicars' Close and the Vicars' Hall, to give the men who were employed to sing in the choir a secure place to live and dine, away from the town and its temptations. He had an uneasy relationship with the citizens of Wells, partly because of his imposition of taxes, and he surrounded his palace with crenellated walls, a moat and a drawbridge.

John Harewell raised money for the completion of the west front by William Wynford, who was appointed as master mason in 1365. One of the foremost master masons of his time, Wynford worked for the king at Windsor, Winchester Cathedral and New College, Oxford. At Wells, he designed the western towers, the north-west of which was not built until the following century. In the 14th century, the central piers of the crossing were found to be sinking under the weight of the crossing tower which had been damaged by an earthquake in the previous century. Strainer arches, sometimes described as scissor arches, were inserted by master mason William Joy to brace and stabilise the piers as a unit.

=== Tudors and Civil War ===
By the reign of Henry VII the cathedral was complete, appearing much as it does today (though the fittings have changed). From 1508 to 1546, the eminent Italian humanist scholar Polydore Vergil was active as the chapter's representative in London. He donated a set of hangings for the choir of the cathedral. While Wells survived the Dissolution of the Monasteries better than the cathedrals of monastic foundation, the abolition of chantries in 1547 resulted in a reduction in its income. Medieval brasses were sold, and a pulpit was placed in the nave for the first time. Between 1551 and 1568, in two periods as dean, William Turner established a herb garden, which was recreated between 2003 and 2010.

Elizabeth I gave the chapter and the Vicars Choral a new charter in 1591, creating a new governing body, consisting of a dean and eight residentiary canons with control over the church estates and authority over its affairs, but no longer entitled to elect the dean (that entitlement thenceforward belonged ultimately to the Crown). The stability brought by the new charter ended with the onset of the Civil War and the execution of Charles I. Local fighting damaged the cathedral's stonework, furniture and windows. The dean, Walter Raleigh, a nephew of the explorer Walter Raleigh, was placed under house arrest after the fall of Bridgwater to the Parliamentarians in 1645, first in the rectory at Chedzoy and then in the deanery at Wells. His jailor, the shoe maker and city constable, David Barrett, caught him writing a letter to his wife. When he refused to surrender it, Barrett ran him through with a sword and he died six weeks later, on 10 October 1646. He was buried in an unmarked grave in the choir before the dean's stall. During the Commonwealth of England under Oliver Cromwell no dean was appointed and the cathedral fell into disrepair. The bishop went into retirement and some of the clerics were reduced to performing menial tasks.

=== 1660–1800 ===
In 1661, after Charles II was restored to the throne, Robert Creighton, the king's chaplain in exile, was appointed dean and was bishop for two years before his death in 1672. His brass lectern, given in thanksgiving, can be seen in the cathedral. He donated the nave's great west window at a cost of £140. Following Creighton's appointment as bishop, the post of dean went to Ralph Bathurst, who had been chaplain to the king, president of Trinity College, Oxford and fellow of the Royal Society. During Bathurst's long tenure the cathedral was restored, but in the Monmouth Rebellion of 1685, Puritan soldiers damaged the west front, tore lead from the roof to make bullets, broke the windows, smashed the organ and furnishings, and for a time stabled their horses in the nave.

Restoration began again under Thomas Ken who was appointed by the Crown in 1685 and served until 1691. He was one of seven bishops imprisoned for refusing to sign King James II's "Declaration of Indulgence", which would have enabled Catholics to resume positions of political power, but popular support led to their acquittal. Ken refused to take the oath of allegiance to William III and Mary II because James II had not abdicated and with others, known as the Nonjurors, was put out of office. His successor, Richard Kidder, was killed in the Great Storm of 1703 when two chimney stacks on the palace fell on him and his wife, while they were asleep in bed.

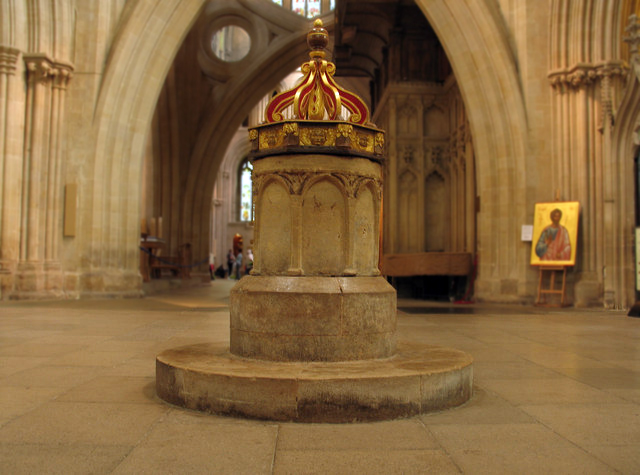
The baptismal font from the Saxon church of Aldhelm (c. 705) predates the cathedral by more than 400 years.

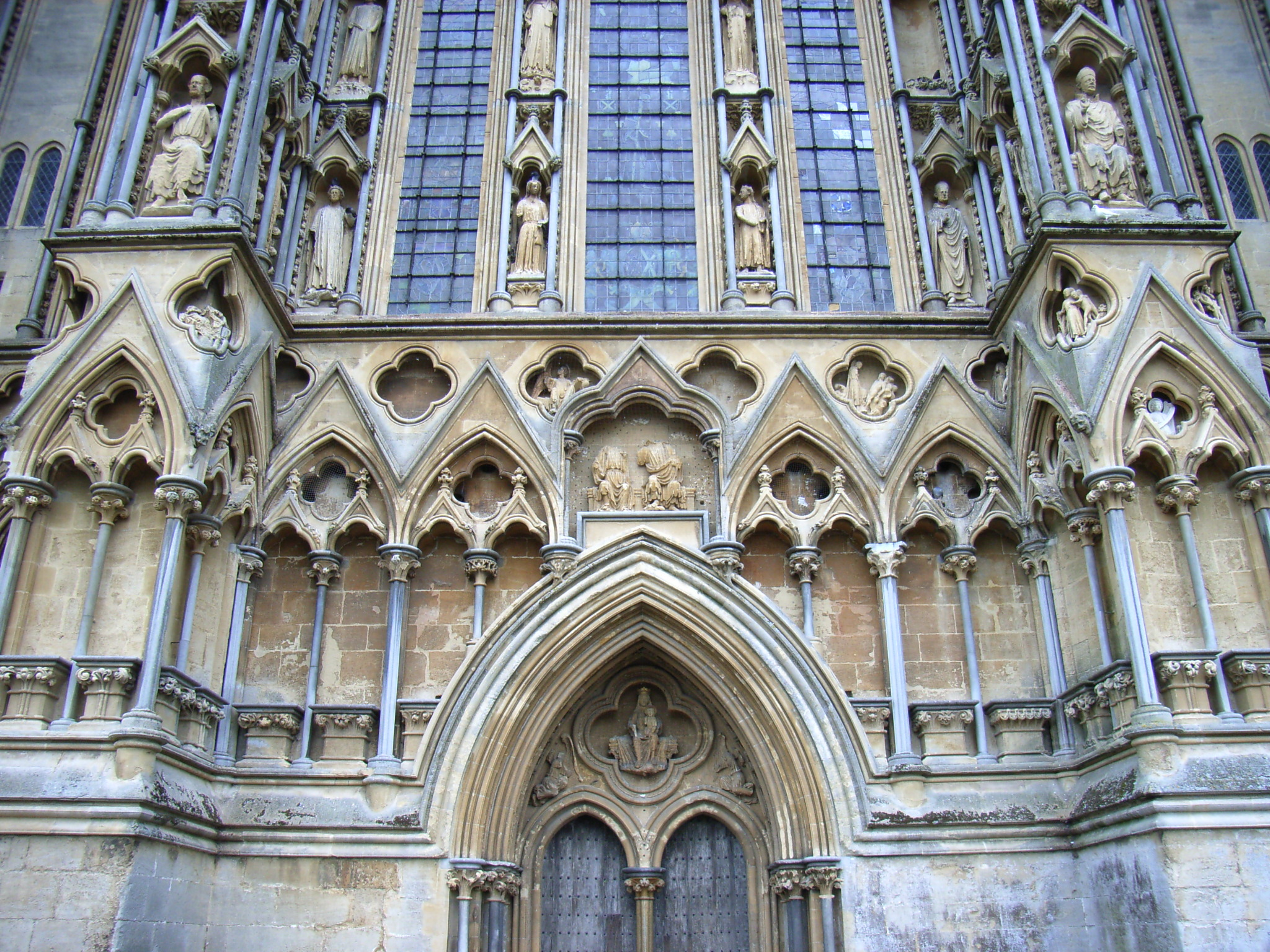
The 13th-century west front was vandalised during the Monmouth Rebellion, destroying many of the carved figures and leaving others, like those of the Coronation of the Virgin, headless.

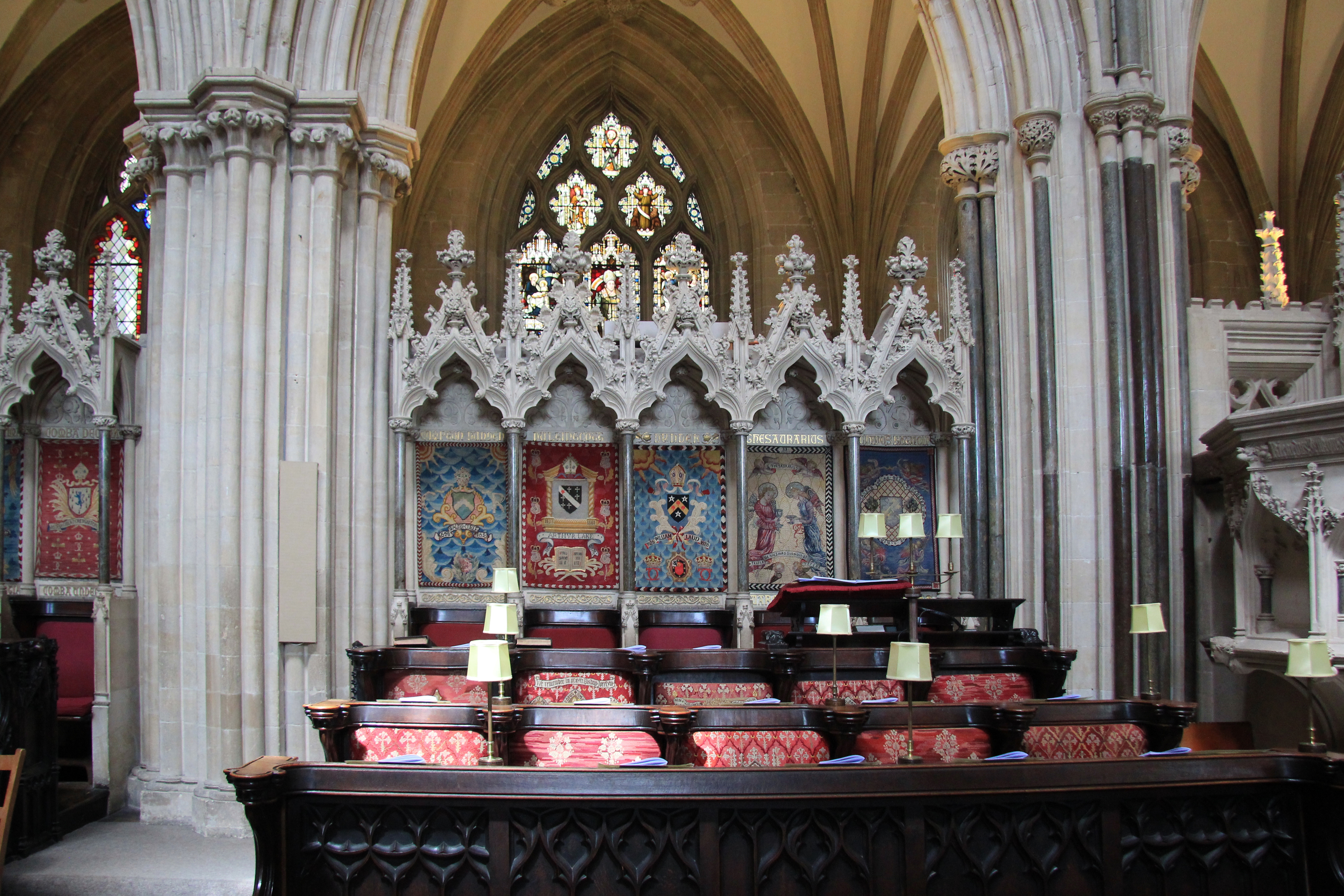
The choir stalls have 19th-century stone canopies and modern embroideries commemorating bishops. The 19th century saw the restoration of the building and its fittings.

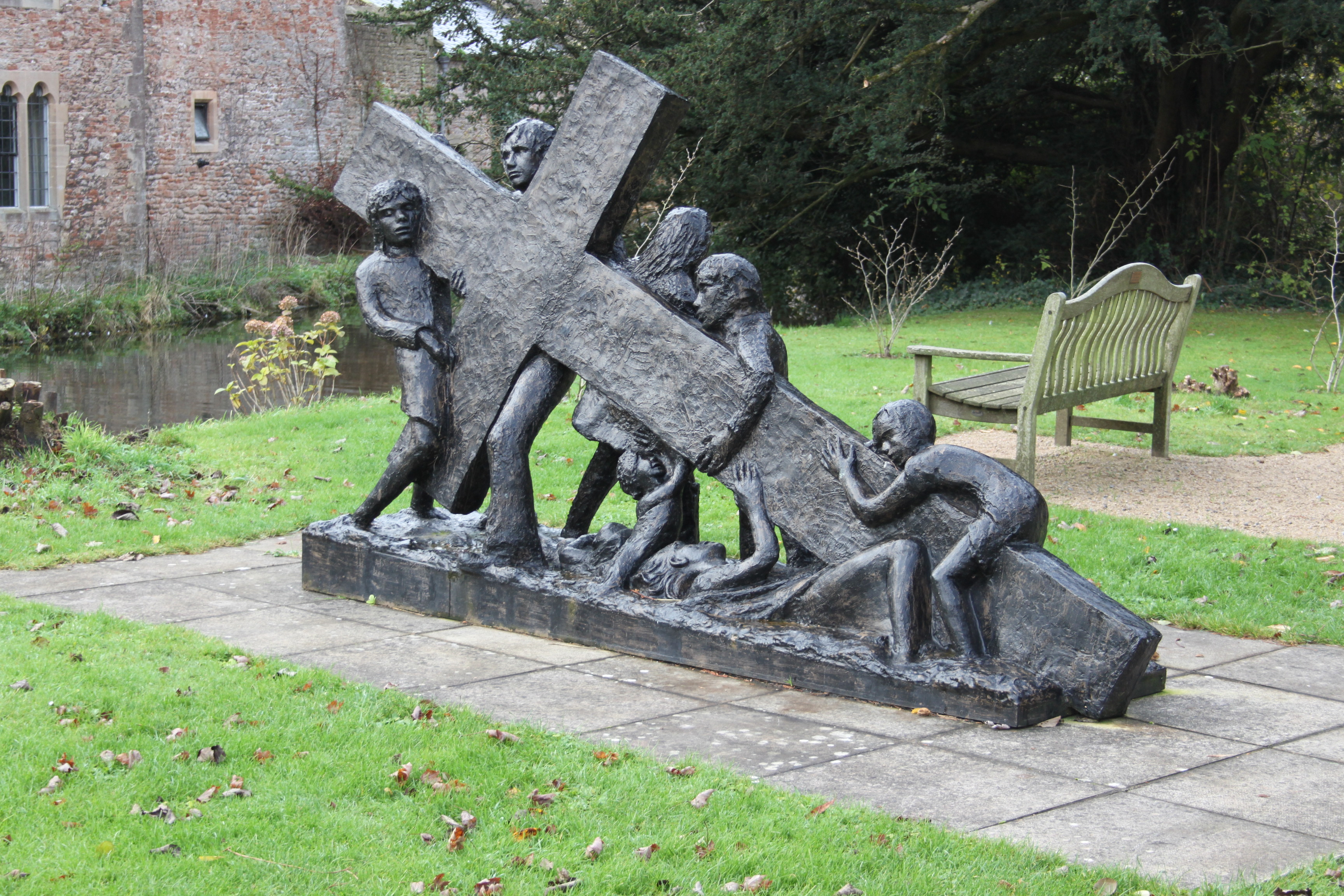
A 1999 sculpture, The Weight of our Sins, by Josefina de Vasconcellos in the grounds of the Bishop's Palace

=== Victorian era to present ===
By the middle of the 19th century, a major restoration programme was needed. Under Dean Goodenough, the monuments were moved to the cloisters and the remaining medieval paint and whitewash removed in an operation known as "the great scrape". Anthony Salvin took charge of the extensive restoration of the choir. Wooden galleries installed in the 16th century were removed and the stalls were given stone canopies and placed further back within the line of the arcade. The medieval stone pulpitum screen was extended in the centre to support a new organ.

In 1933 the Friends of Wells Cathedral were formed to support the cathedral's chapter in the maintenance of the fabric, life and work of the cathedral. The late 20th century saw an extensive restoration programme, particularly of the west front. The stained glass is currently under restoration, with a programme underway to conserve the large 14th-century Jesse Tree window at the eastern terminal of the choir.

In January 2014, as part of the Bath film festival, the cathedral hosted a special screening of Martin Scorsese's The Last Temptation of Christ. This provoked some controversy, but the church defended its decision to allow the screening. In 2021, a contemporary sculpture by Antony Gormley was unveiled on a temporary plinth outside the cathedral.

In April 2025, another major restoration of the Cathedral's western front began.

== Ministry ==
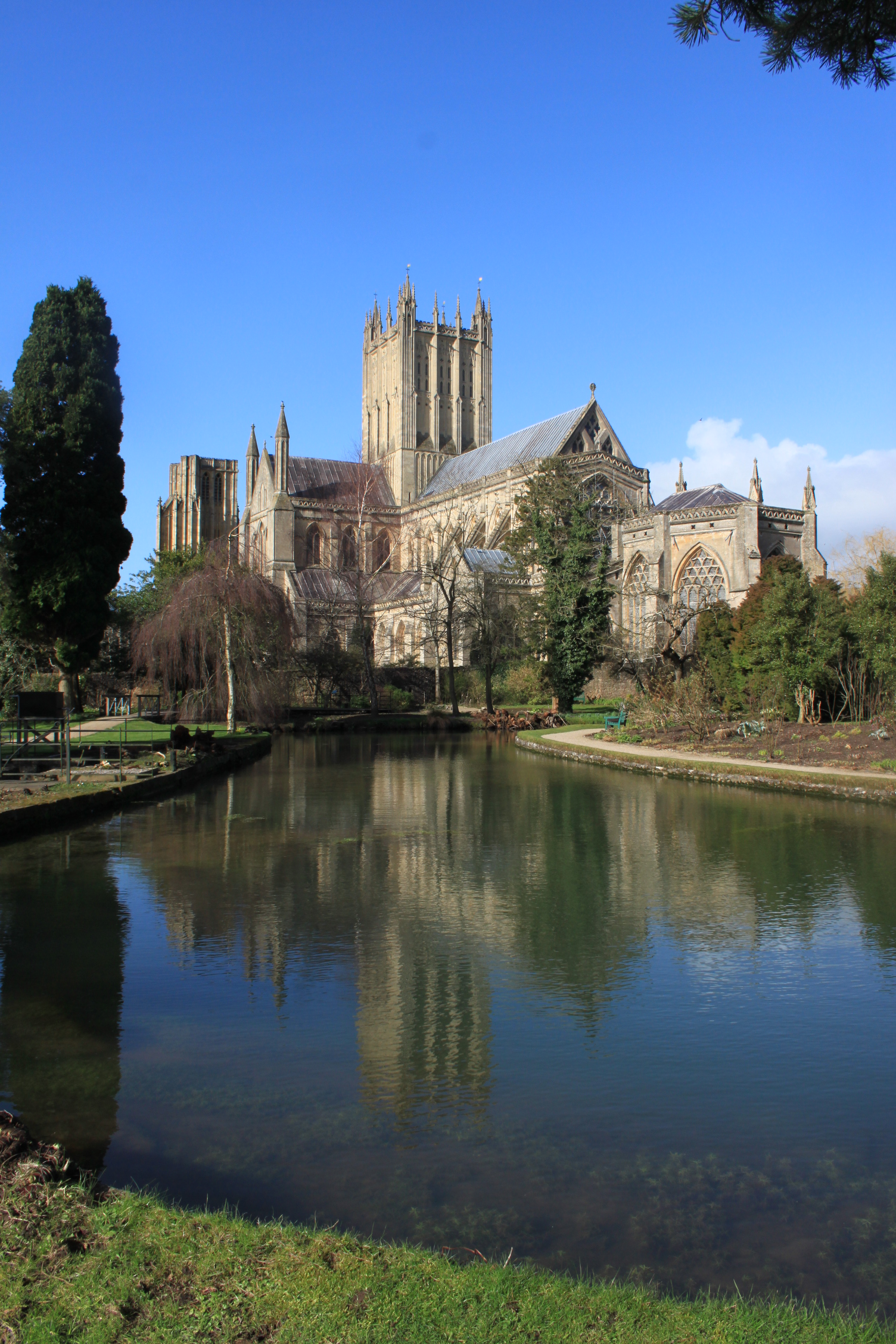
From the reflecting pool in the grounds of the Bishop's Palace

Since the 13th century, Wells Cathedral has been the seat of the Bishop of Bath and Wells. Its governing body, the chapter, is made up of five clerical canons (the dean, the precentor, the canon chancellor, the canon treasurer, and the Archdeacon of Wells) and four lay members: the administrator, the Keeper of the Fabric, the Overseer of the Estate, and the chairman of the cathedral shop and catering boards. The current bishop of Bath and Wells is Michael Beesley, who was installed in a service in the cathedral on 19 November 2022. The current dean of Wells is Toby Wright, who was installed on 16 June 2024.

Staff include the organist and master of choristers, head Verger archivist, librarian and the staff of the shop, café and restaurant. The chapter is advised by specialists such as architects, archaeologists and financial analysts.

More than a thousand services are held every year. There are daily services of Matins, Holy Communion and Choral Evensong, as well as major celebrations of Christian festivals such as Christmas, Easter, Pentecost and saints' days. The cathedral is also used for the baptisms, weddings and funerals of those with close connections to it. In July 2009 the cathedral undertook the funeral of Harry Patch, the last British Army veteran of World War I, who died at the age of 111.

Three Sunday services are led by the resident choir in school terms and choral services are sung on weekdays. The cathedral hosts visiting choirs and does outreach work with local schools as part of its Chorister Outreach Project. It is also a venue for musical events such as an annual concert by the Somerset Chamber Choir.

Each year about 150,000 people attend services and another 300,000 visit as tourists. General admission tickets can be purchased via the Welcome Desk. There is no charge for people who wish to come into the Cathedral to pray, attend a service, or light a candle.

== Architecture ==
=== Dates, styles and architects ===
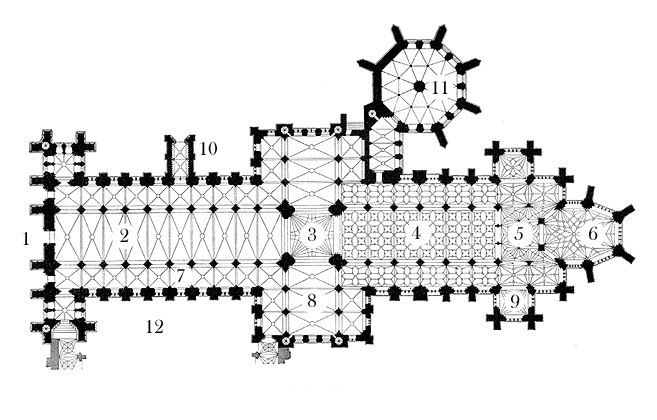
Plan of Wells Cathedral: (Note: Adapted from a plan by Georg Dehio): 1. West front; 2. Nave; 3. Central tower; 4. Choir; 5. Retrochoir; 6. Lady Chapel; 7. Aisle; 8. Transept; 9. East transept; 10. North porch; 11. Chapter house; 12. Cloister

Construction of the cathedral began in about 1175, to the design of an unknown master-mason. Wells is the first cathedral in England to be built, from its foundation, in Gothic style. According to art historian John Harvey, it is the first truly Gothic cathedral in the world, its architects having entirely dispensed with all features that bound the contemporary east end of Canterbury Cathedral and the earlier buildings of France, such as the east end of the Abbey of Saint Denis, to the Romanesque. Unlike these churches, Wells has clustered piers rather than columns and has a gallery of identical pointed arches rather than the typically Romanesque form of paired openings. The style, with its simple lancet arches without tracery and convoluted mouldings, is known as Early English Gothic.

From about 1192 to 1230, Adam Lock, the earliest master-mason at Wells for whom a name is known, continued the transept and nave in the same manner as his predecessor. Lock was also the builder of the north porch, to his own design.

The Early English west front was commenced around 1230 by Thomas Norreys, with building and sculpture continuing for thirty years. Its south-west tower was begun 100 years later and constructed between 1365 and 1395, and the north-west tower between 1425 and 1435, both in the Perpendicular Gothic style to the design of William Wynford, who also filled many of the cathedral's early English lancet windows with delicate tracery.

The undercroft and chapter house were built by unknown architects between 1275 and 1310, the undercroft in the Early English and the chapter house in the Geometric style of Decorated Gothic architecture. In about 1310 work commenced on the Lady Chapel, to the design of Thomas Witney, who also built the central tower from 1315 to 1322 in the Decorated Gothic style. The tower was later braced internally with arches by William Joy. Concurrent with this work, in 1329–45 Joy made alterations and extensions to the choir, joining it to the Lady Chapel with the retrochoir, the latter in the Flowing Decorated style.

Later changes include the Perpendicular vault of the tower and construction of Sugar's Chapel, 1475–1490 by William Smyth. Also, Gothic Revival renovations were made to the choir and pulpitum by Benjamin Ferrey and Anthony Salvin, 1842–1857. Fletcher claims Ferry practically rebuilt the central tower in facsimile adding only several pinnacles

=== Plan ===
Wells has a total length of 415 feet (126 m). Like Canterbury, Lincoln and Salisbury cathedrals, it has the distinctly English arrangement of two transepts, with the body of the church divided into distinct parts: nave, choir, and retrochoir, beyond which extends the Lady Chapel. The façade is wide, with its towers extending beyond the transepts on either side. There is a large projecting porch on the north side of the nave forming an entry into the cathedral. To the north-east is the large octagonal chapter house, entered from the north choir aisle by a passage and staircase. To the south of the nave is a large cloister, unusual in that the northern range, that adjacent the cathedral, was never built.

=== Elevation ===
In section, the cathedral has the usual arrangement of a large church: a central nave with an aisle on each side, separated by two arcades. The elevation is in three stages, arcade, triforium gallery and clerestory. The nave is 67 feet (20 m) in height, very low compared to the Gothic cathedrals of France. It has a markedly horizontal emphasis, caused by the triforium having a unique form, a series of identical narrow openings, lacking the usual definition of the bays. The triforium is separated from the arcade by a single horizontal string course that runs unbroken the length of the nave. There are no vertical lines linking the three stages, as the shafts supporting the vault rise above the triforium.

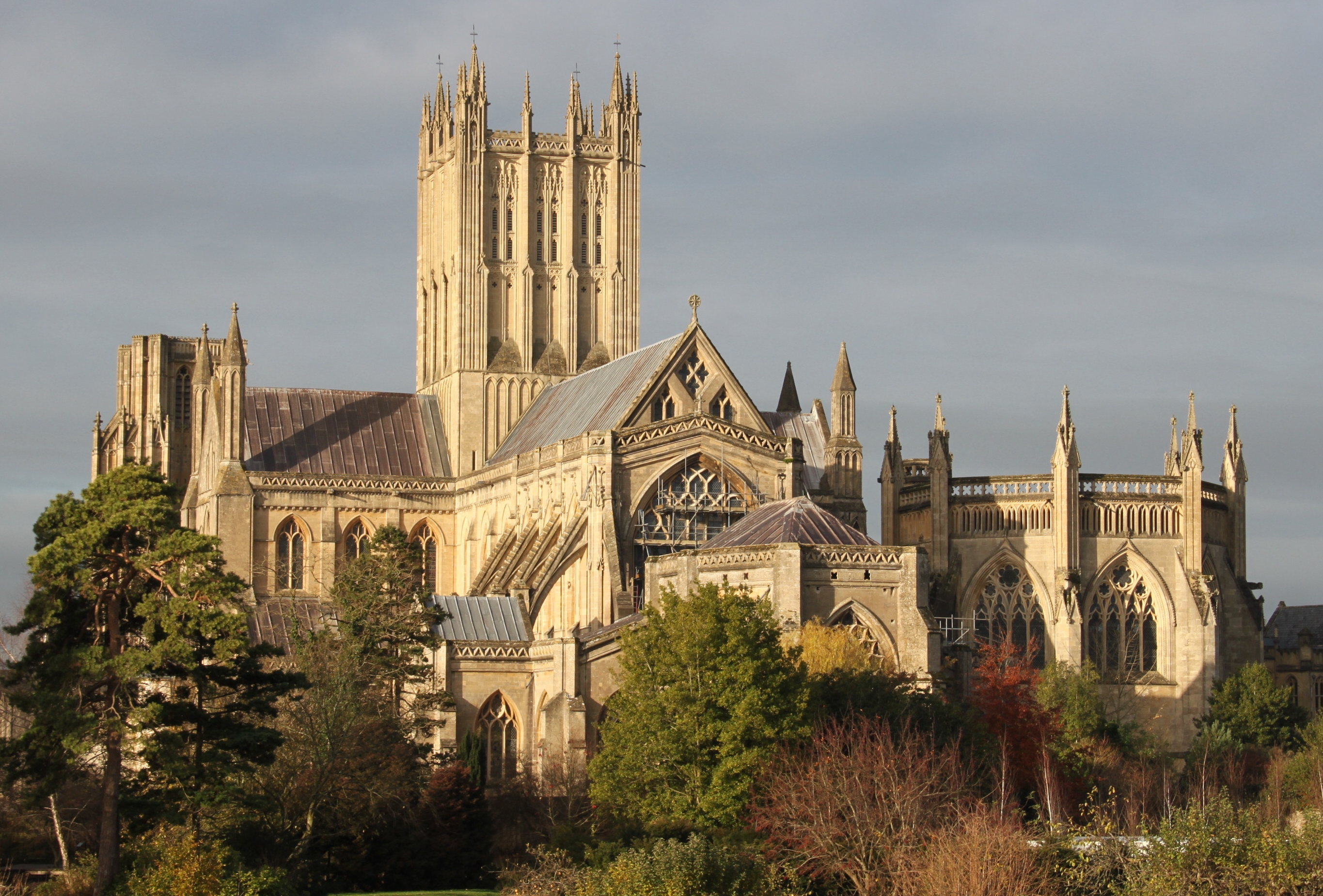
The cathedral from the south east. To the right of the central tower is the choir with the Lady Chapel projecting beyond it, and the chapter house, extreme right.

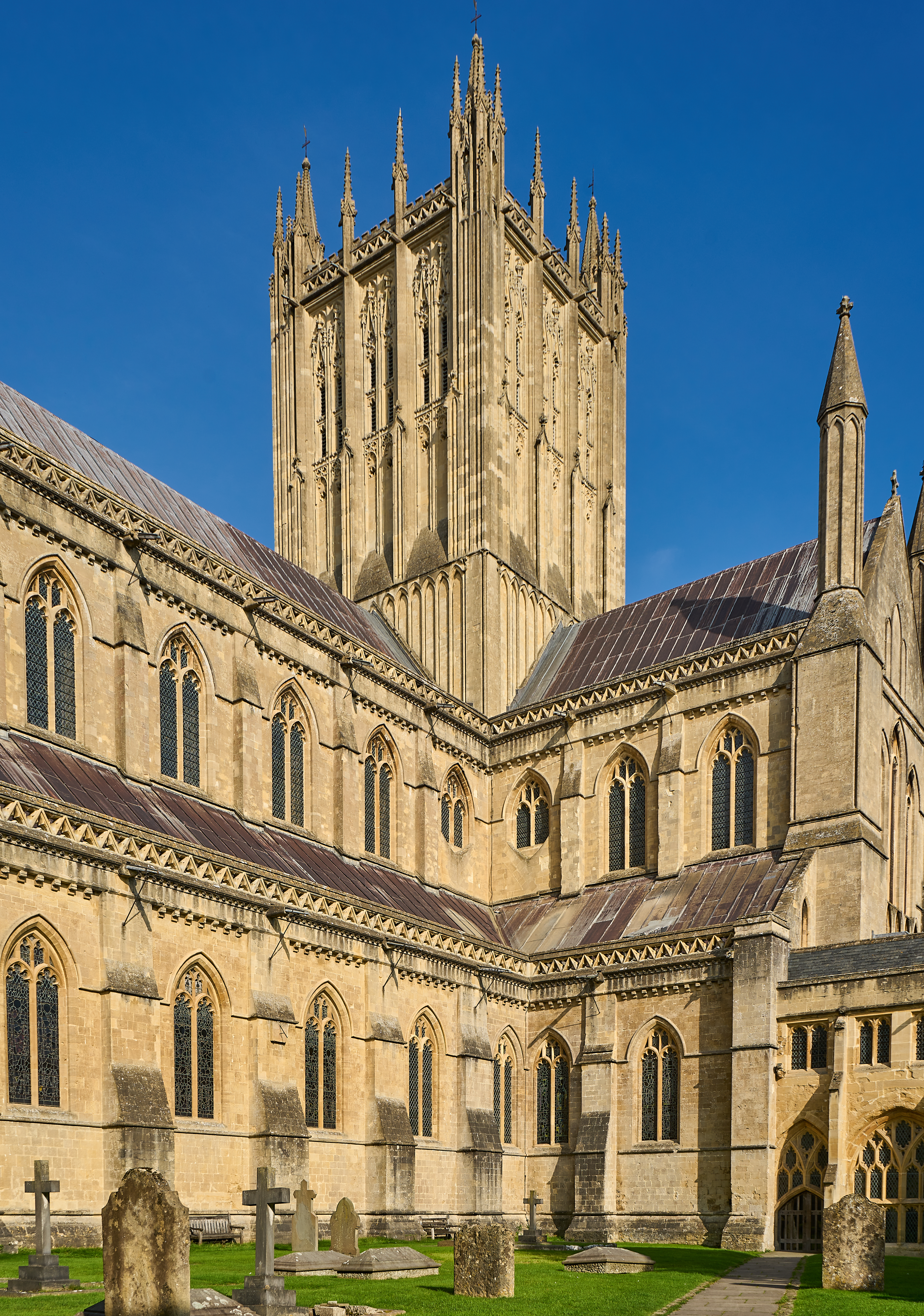
The central tower, nave and south transept seen from the cloister garth. The nave rises above the pitched roof of the aisle. The buttresses are of low profile.

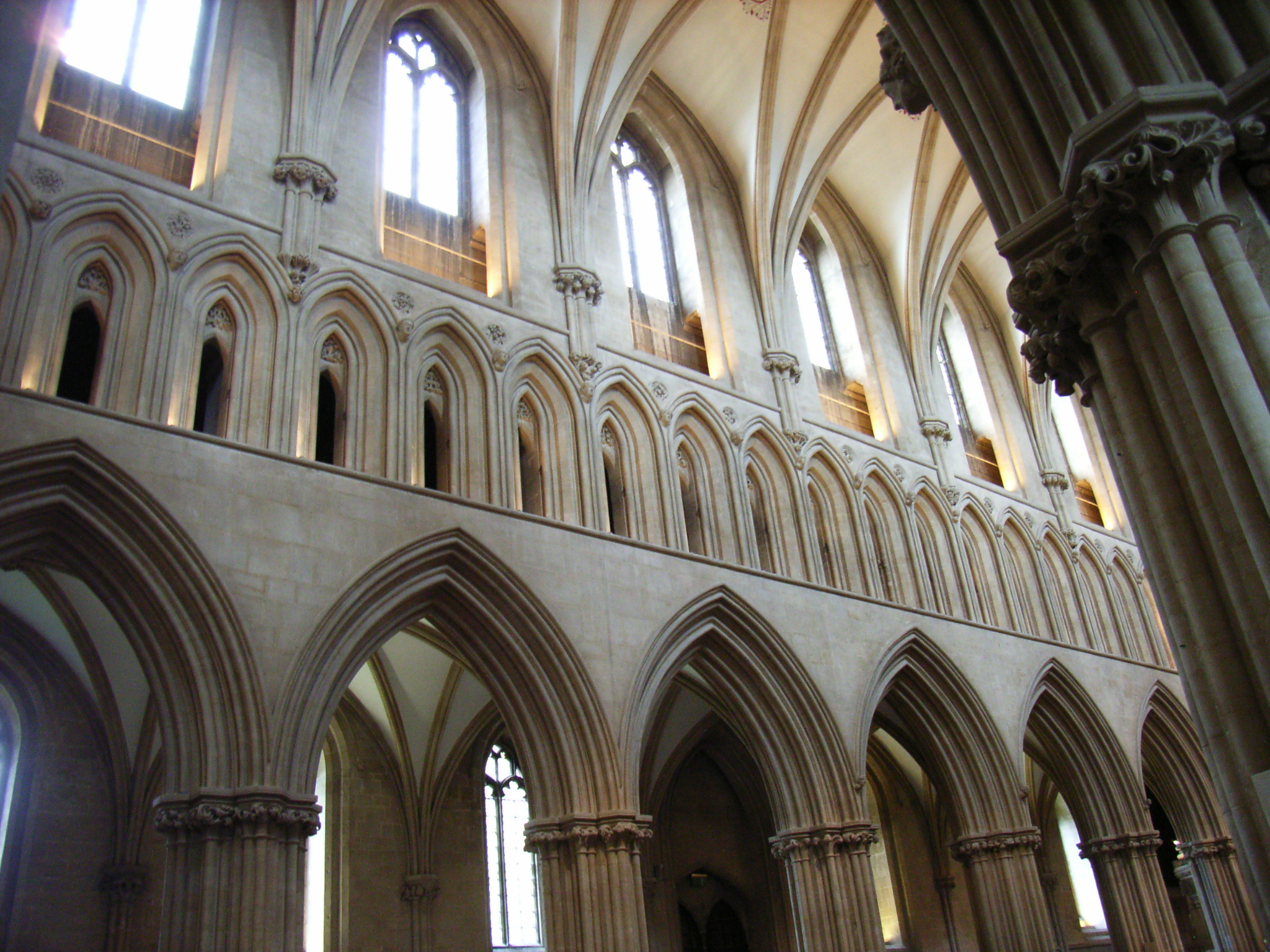
The internal elevation of the nave is in three levels: arcade, triforium gallery and clerestory. The triforium has a unique form with the arches not grouped into bays.

=== Exterior ===
The exterior of Wells Cathedral presents a relatively tidy and harmonious appearance since the greater part of the building was executed in a single style, Early English Gothic. This is uncommon among English cathedrals where the exterior usually exhibits a plethora of styles. At Wells, later changes in the Perpendicular style were universally applied, such as filling the Early English lancet windows with simple tracery, the construction of a parapet that encircles the roof, and the addition of pinnacles framing each gable, similar to those around the chapter house and on the west front. At the eastern end there is a proliferation of tracery with repeated motifs in the Reticulated style, a stage between Geometric and Flowing Decorated tracery.

==== West front ====
The west front is 100 feet (30 m) high and 147 feet (45 m) wide, and built of Inferior Oolite of the Middle Jurassic period, which came from the Doulting Stone Quarry, about 8 miles (13 km) to the east. According to the architectural historian Alec Clifton-Taylor, it is "one of the great sights of England".

West fronts in general take three distinct forms: those that follow the elevation of the nave and aisles, those that have paired towers at the end of each aisle, framing the nave, and those that screen the form of the building. The west front at Wells has the paired-tower form, unusual in that the towers do not indicate the location of the aisles, but extend well beyond them, screening the dimensions and profile of the building.

The west front rises in three distinct stages, each clearly defined by a horizontal course. This horizontal emphasis is counteracted by six strongly projecting buttresses defining the cross-sectional divisions of nave, aisles and towers, and are highly decorated, each having canopied niches containing the largest statues on the façade.

At the lowest level of the façade is a plain base, contrasting with and stabilising the ornate arcades that rise above it. The base is penetrated by three doors, which are in stark contrast to the often imposing portals of French Gothic cathedrals. The outer two are of domestic proportion and the central door is ornamented only by a central post, quatrefoil and the fine mouldings of the arch.

Above the basement rise two storeys, ornamented with quatrefoils and niches originally holding about four hundred statues, with three hundred surviving until the mid-20th century. Since then, some have been restored or replaced, including the ruined figure of Christ in the gable.

The third stages of the flanking towers were both built in the Perpendicular style of the late 14th century, to the design of William Wynford; that on the north-west was not begun until about 1425. The design maintains the general proportions, and continues the strong projection of the buttresses.

The finished product has been criticised for its lack of pinnacles, and it is probable that the towers were intended to carry spires which were never built. Despite its lack of spires or pinnacles, the architectural historian Banister Fletcher describes it as "the highest development in English Gothic of this type of façade."

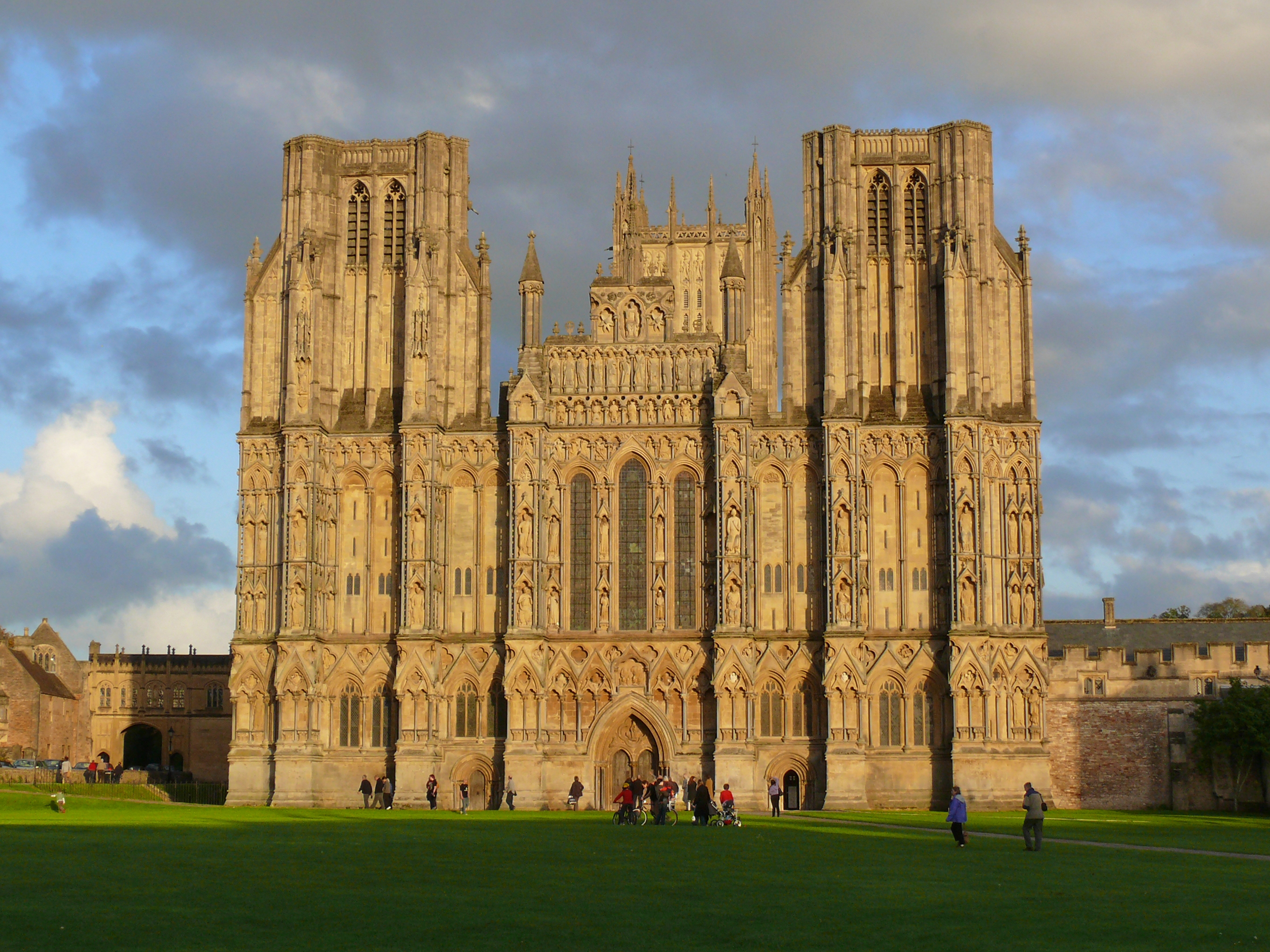
The 13th-century west front by Thomas Norreys. As a synthesis of form, architectural decoration and figurative sculpture it is considered to be unsurpassed in Britain.

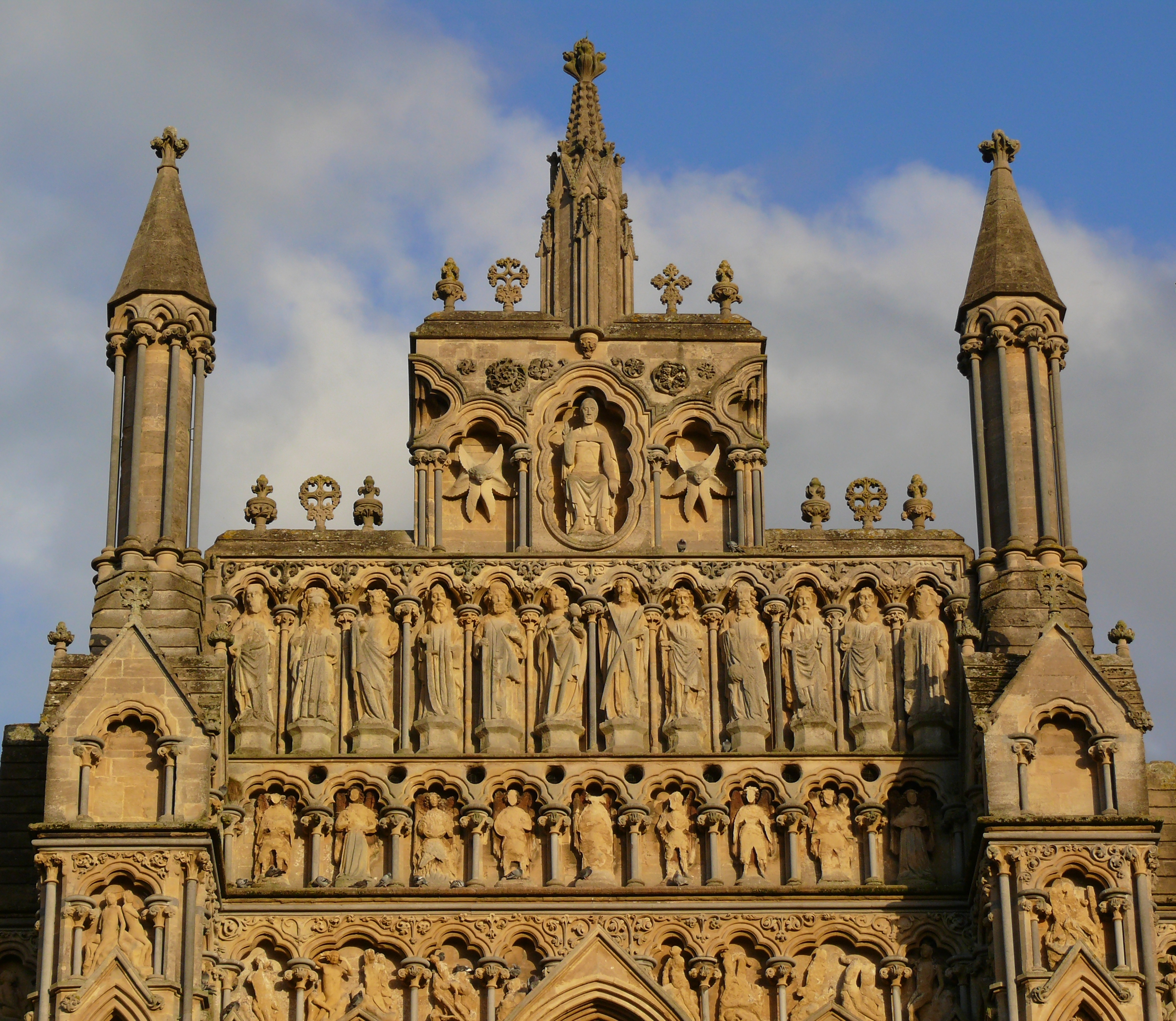
Christ the Judge, (late 20th-century) occupies the gable. Beneath are twelve apostles and nine archangels.

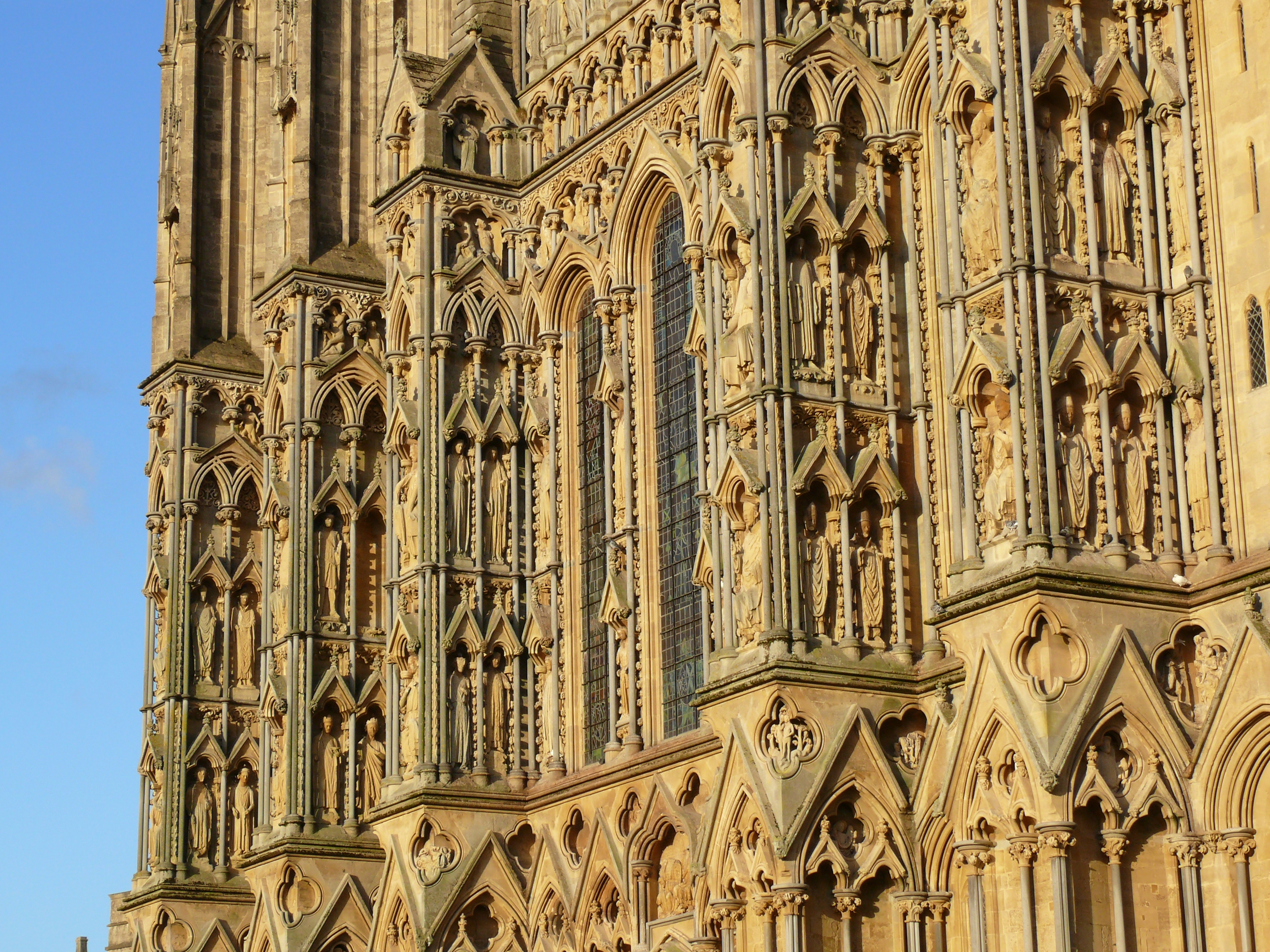
The strongly projecting buttresses have niches for statues.

===== Iconography of the west front =====
The sculptures on the west front at Wells include standing figures, seated figures, half-length angels and narratives in high relief. Many of the figures are life-sized or larger. Together they constitute the finest display of medieval carving in England. The figures and many of the architectural details were painted in bright colours, and the colouring scheme has been deduced from flakes of paint still adhering to some surfaces. The sculptures occupy nine architectural zones stretching horizontally across the entire west front and around the sides and the eastern returns of the towers which extend beyond the aisles. The strongly projecting buttresses have tiers of niches which contain many of the largest figures. Other large figures, including that of Christ, occupy the gable. A single figure stands in one of two later niches high on the northern tower.

In 1851 the archaeologist Charles Robert Cockerell published his analysis of the iconography, numbering the nine sculptural divisions from the lowest to the highest. He defined the theme as "a calendar for unlearned men" illustrating the doctrines and history of the Christian faith, its introduction to Britain and its protection by princes and bishops. He likens the arrangement and iconography to the Te Deum.

According to Cockerell, the side of the façade that is to the south of the central door is the more sacred and the scheme is divided accordingly. The lowest range of niches each contained a standing figure, of which all but four figures on the west front, two on each side, have been destroyed. More have survived on the northern and eastern sides of the north tower. Cockerell speculates that those to the south of the portal represented prophets and patriarchs of the Old Testament while those to the north represented early missionaries to Britain, of which Augustine of Canterbury, St Birinus, and Benedict Biscop are identifiable by their attributes. In the second zone, above each pair of standing figures, is a quatrefoil containing a half-length angel in relief, some of which have survived. Between the gables of the niches are quatrefoils that contain a series of narratives from the Bible, with the Old Testament stories to the south, above the prophets and patriarchs, and those from the New Testament to the north. A horizontal course runs around the west front dividing the architectural storeys at this point.

Above the course, zones four and five, as identified by Cockerell, contain figures which represent the Christian Church in Britain, with the spiritual lords such as bishops, abbots, abbesses and saintly founders of monasteries on the south, while kings, queens and princes occupy the north. Many of the figures survive and many have been identified in the light of their various attributes. There is a hierarchy of size, with the more significant figures larger and enthroned in their niches rather than standing. Immediately beneath the upper course are a series of small niches containing dynamic sculptures of the dead coming forth from their tombs on the Day of Judgement. Although naked, some of the dead are defined as royalty by their crowns and others as bishops by their mitres. Some emerge from their graves with joy and hope, and others with despair.

The niches in the lowest zone of the gable contain nine angels, of which Cockerell identifies Michael, Gabriel, Raphael and Uriel. In the next zone are the taller figures of the twelve apostles, some, such as John, Andrew and Bartholomew, clearly identifiable by the attributes that they carry. The uppermost niches of the gable contained the figure of Christ the Judge at the centre, with the Virgin Mary on his right and John the Baptist on his left. The figures all suffered from iconoclasm. A new statue of Jesus was carved for the central niche, but the two side niches now contain cherubim. Christ and the Virgin Mary are also represented by now headless figures in a Coronation of the Virgin in a niche above the central portal. A damaged figure of the Virgin and Christ Child occupies a quatrefoil in the spandrel of the door.

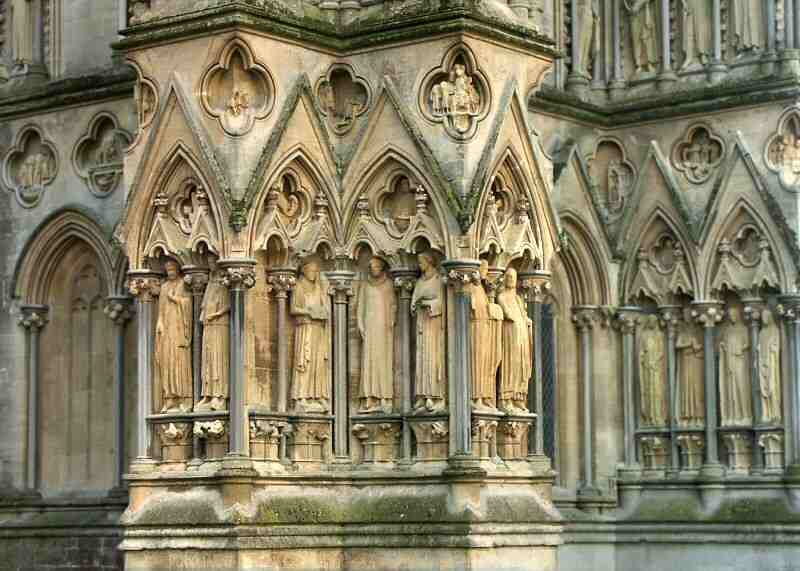
In the lowest range, many statues are lost but this group of saints remains at the back of the north tower.

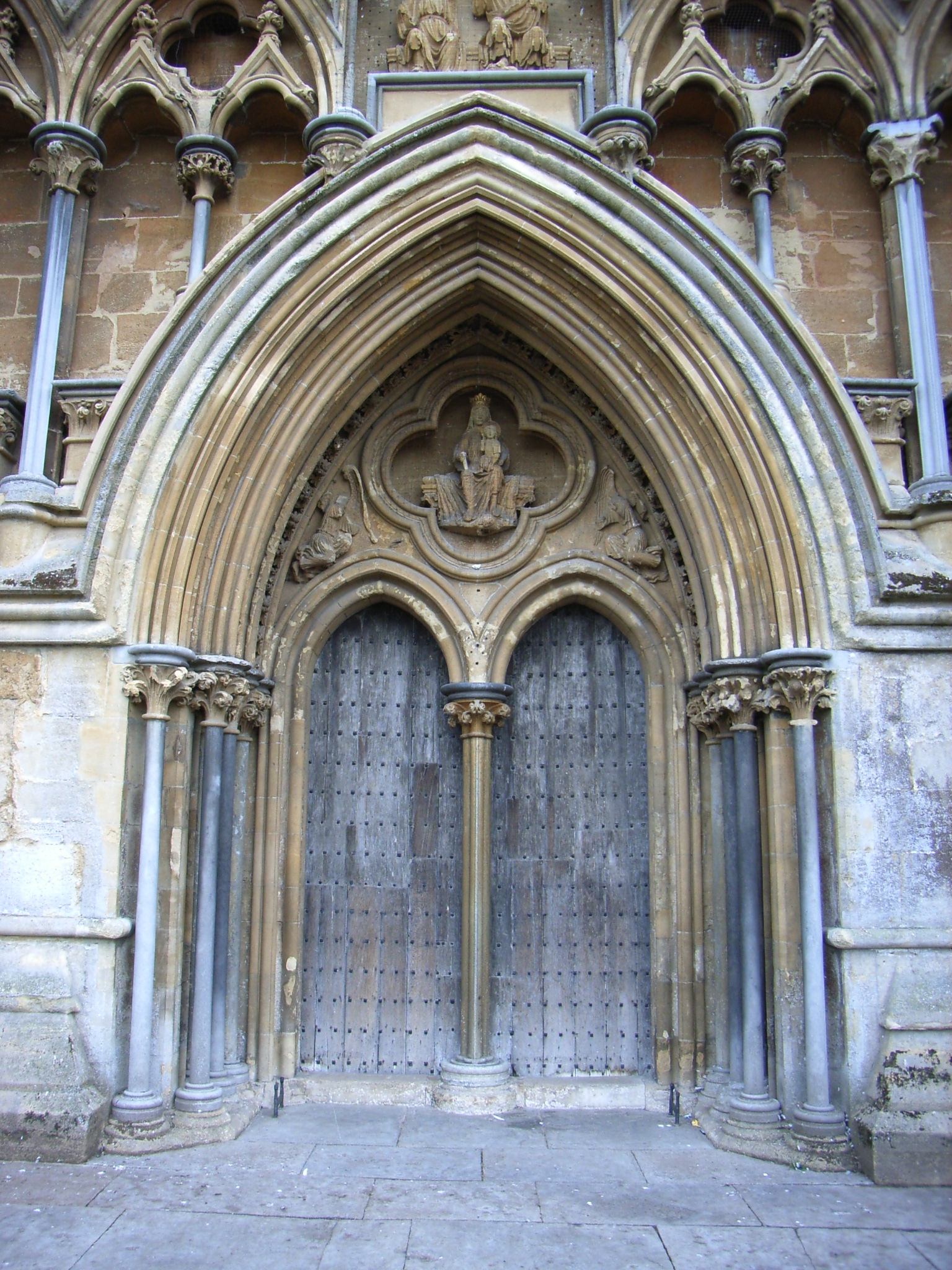
There is a sculpture of the Virgin and Christ Child above the west door.

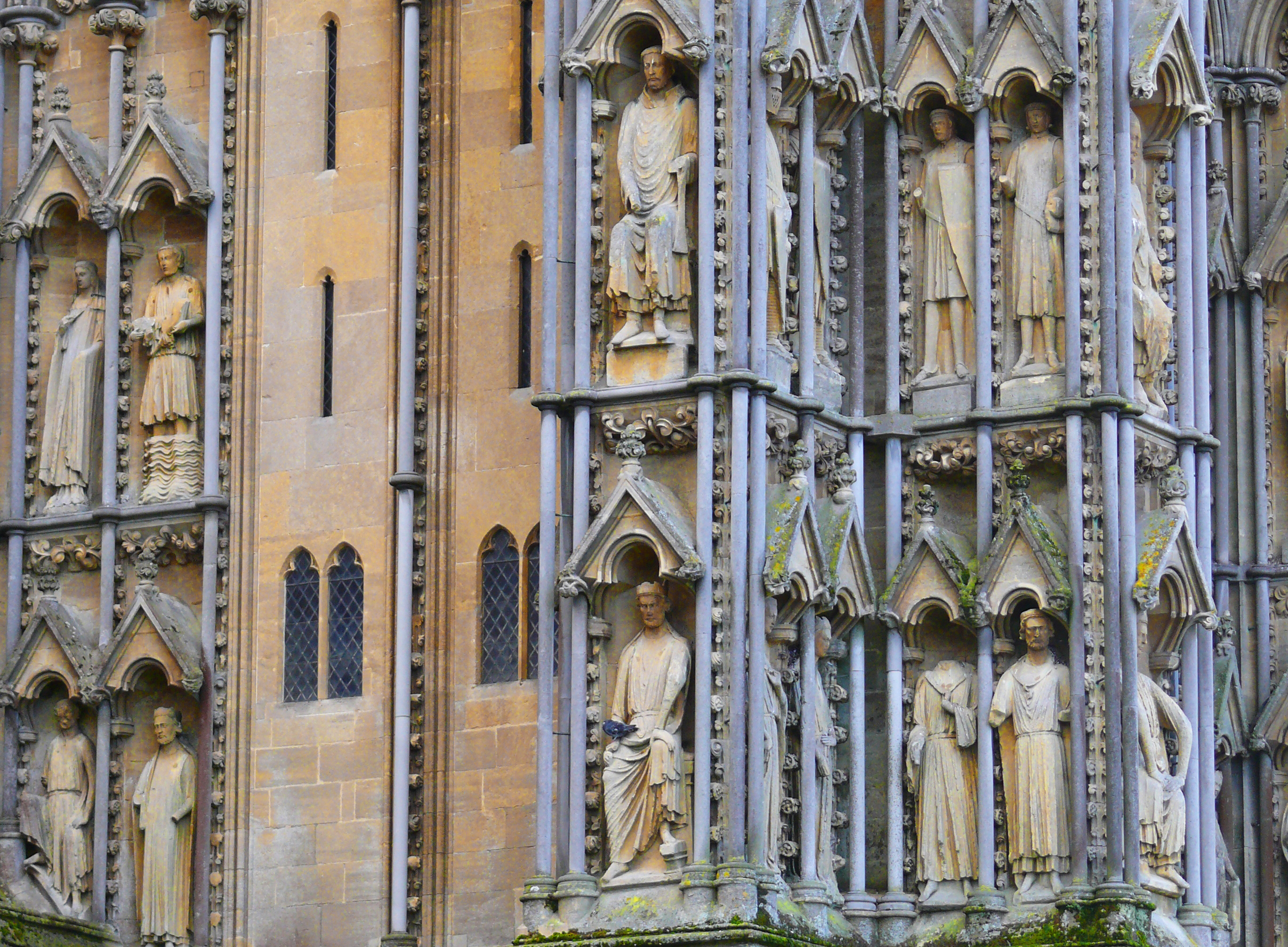
A gallery of royalty fills the niches of the north west buttresses, with clerics on the south west.

==== Crossing tower ====
The central tower appears to date from the early 13th century. It was substantially reconstructed in the early 14th century during the remodelling of the east end, necessitating the internal bracing of the piers a decade or so later. In the 14th century the tower was given a timber and lead spire which burnt down in 1439. The exterior was then reworked in the Perpendicular style and given the present parapet and pinnacles. Alec Clifton-Taylor describes it as "outstanding even in Somerset, a county famed for the splendour of its church towers".

==== North porch ====
The north porch is described by art historian Nikolaus Pevsner as "sumptuously decorated", and intended as the main entrance. Externally it is simple and rectangular with plain side walls. The entrance is a steeply arched portal framed by rich mouldings of eight shafts with stiff-leaf capitals each encircled by an annular moulding at middle height. Those on the left are figurative, containing images representing the martyrdom of St Edmund the Martyr. The walls are lined with deep niches framed by narrow shafts with capitals and annulets like those of the portal. The path to the north porch is lined by four sculptures in Purbeck stone, each by Mary Spencer Watson, representing the symbols of the Evangelists.

==== Cloisters ====
The cloisters were built in the late 13th century and largely rebuilt from 1430 to 1508 and have wide openings divided by mullions and transoms, and tracery in the Perpendicular Gothic style. The vault has lierne ribs that form octagons at the centre of each compartment, the joints of each rib having decorative bosses. The eastern range is of two storeys, of which the upper is the library built in the 15th century.

Because Wells Cathedral was secular rather than monastic, cloisters were not a practical necessity. They were omitted from several other secular cathedrals but were built here and at Chichester. Explanations for their construction at these two secular cathedrals range from the processional to the aesthetic. As at Chichester, there is no northern range to the cloisters. In monastic cloisters it was the north range, benefiting most from winter sunlight, that was often used as a scriptorium.

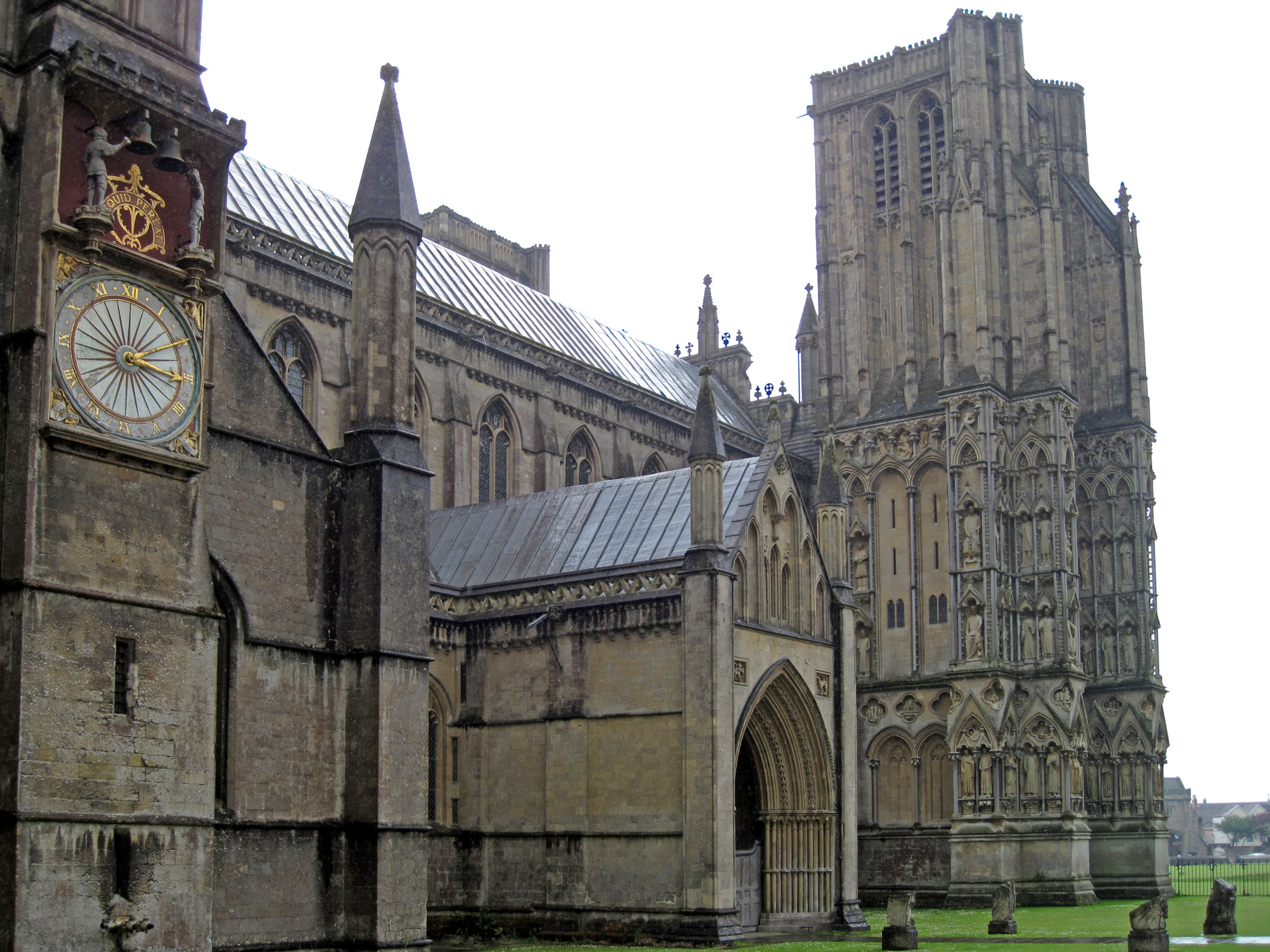
The north transept with its Medieval clock face, the north porch and north-west tower

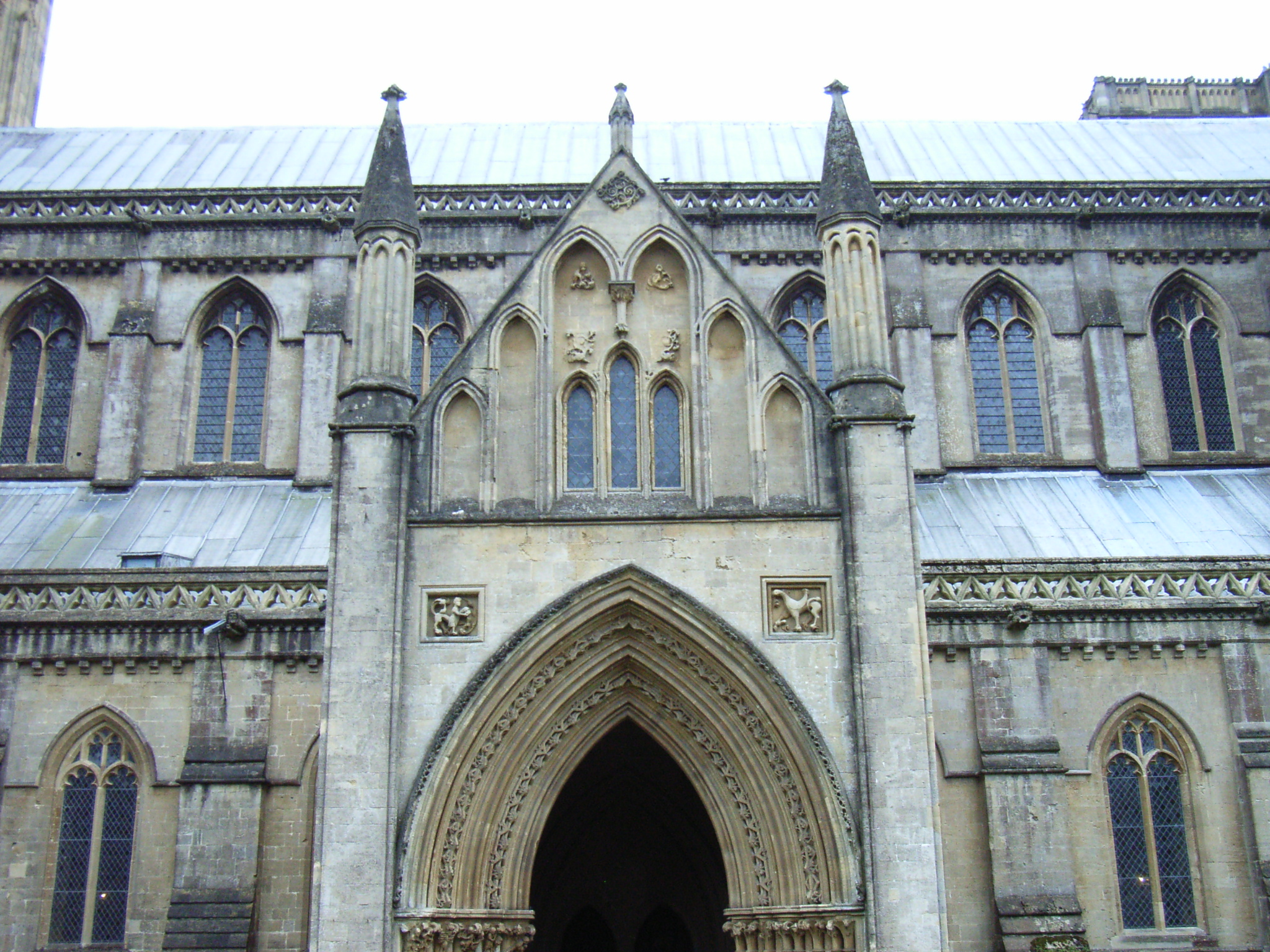
The portal of the north porch has complex mouldings with sprouting foliage in the rebates.

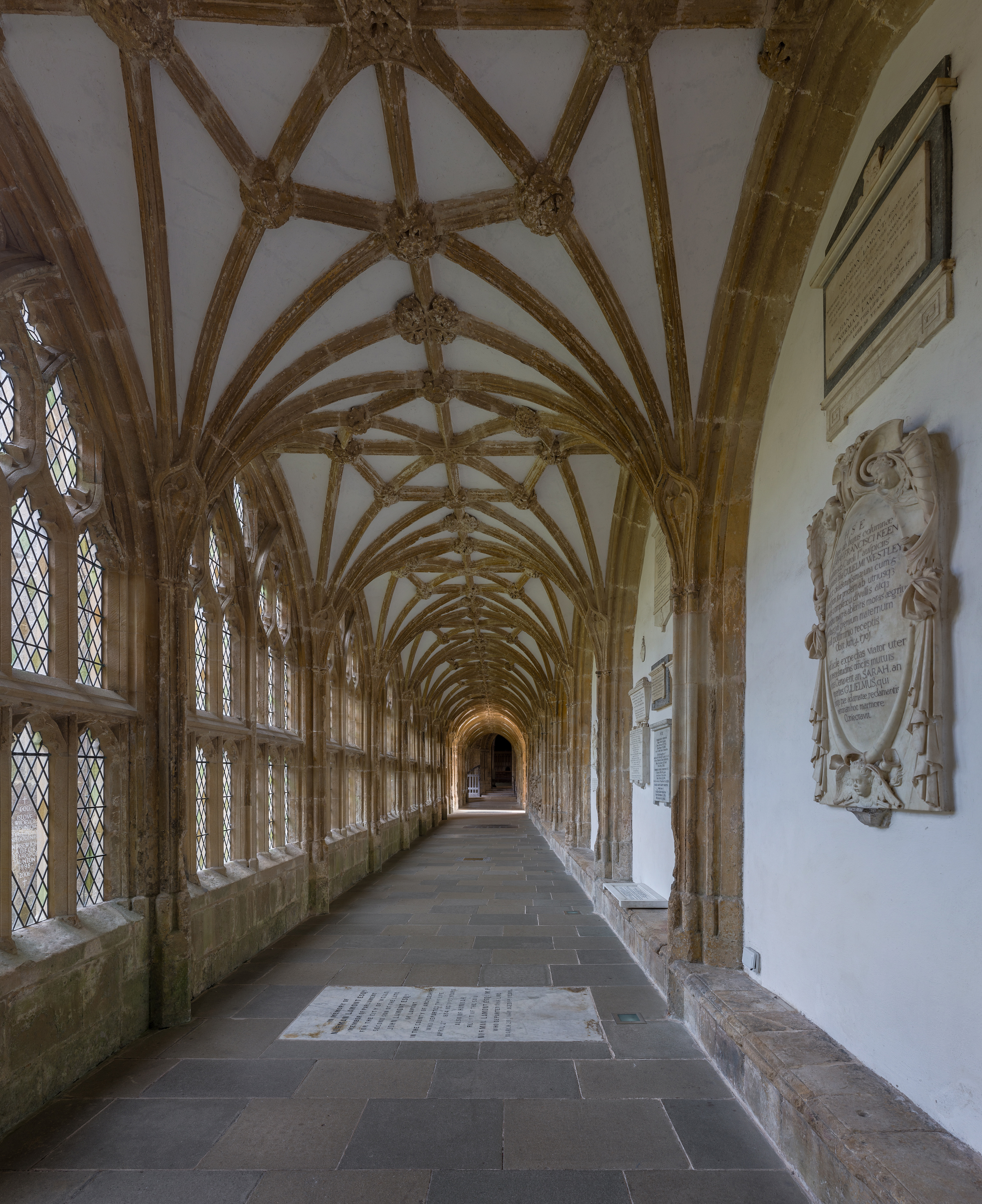
View along the cloister showing the lierne vault

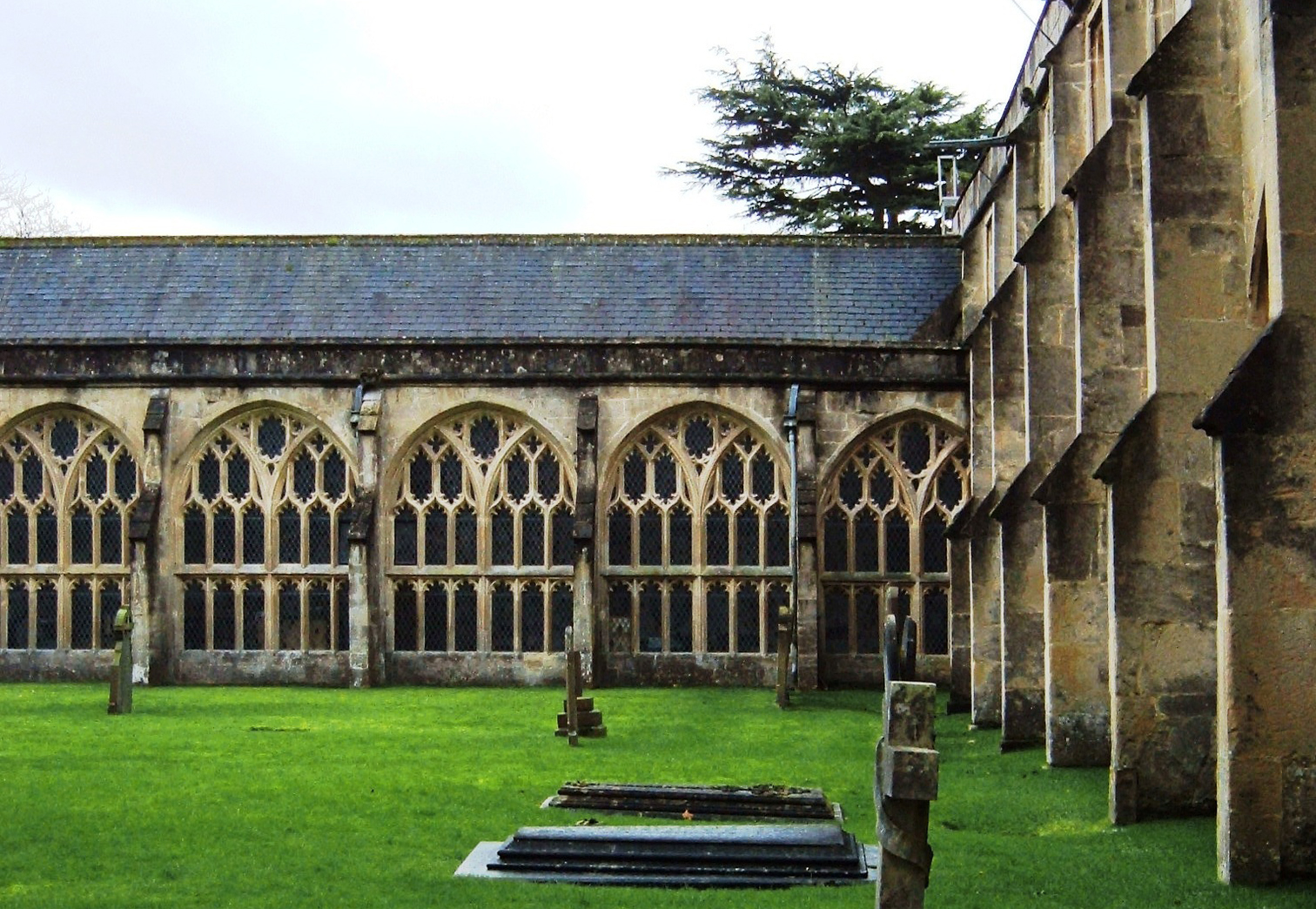
The cloisters, built in several stages, have Perpendicular tracery.

==== Restoration ====
In 1969, when a large chunk of stone fell from a statue near the main door, it became apparent that there was an urgent need for restoration of the west front. Detailed studies of the stonework and of conservation practices were undertaken under the cathedral architect, Alban D. R. Caroe and a restoration committee formed. The methods selected were those devised by Eve and Robert Baker. W. A. (Bert) Wheeler, clerk of works to the cathedral 1935–1978, had previously experimented with washing and surface treatment of architectural carvings on the building and his techniques were among those tried on the statues.

The conservation was carried out between 1974 and 1986, wherever possible using non-invasive procedures such as washing with water and a solution of lime, filling gaps and damaged surfaces with soft mortar to prevent the ingress of water and stabilising statues that were fracturing through corrosion of metal dowels. The surfaces were finished by painting with a thin coat of mortar and silane to resist further erosion and attack by pollutants. The restoration of the façade revealed much paint adhering to the statues and their niches, indicating that it had once been brightly coloured.

=== Interior ===
==== Choir, transept and nave ====
The particular character of this Early English interior is dependent on the proportions of the simple lancet arches. It is also dependent on the refinement of the architectural details, in particular the mouldings.

The arcade, which takes the same form in the nave, choir and transepts, is distinguished by the richness of both mouldings and carvings. Each pier of the arcade has a surface enrichment of 24 slender shafts in eight groups of three, rising beyond the capitals to form the deeply undulating mouldings of the arches. The capitals themselves are remarkable for the vitality of the stylised foliage, in a style known as "stiff-leaf". The liveliness contrasts with the formality of the moulded shafts and the smooth unbroken areas of ashlar masonry in the spandrels. Each capital is different, and some contain small figures illustrating narratives.

The vault of the nave rises steeply in a simple quadripartite form, in harmony with the nave arcade. The eastern end of the choir was extended and the whole upper part elaborated in the second quarter of the 14th century by William Joy. The vault has a multiplicity of ribs in a net-like form, which is very different from that of the nave, and is perhaps a recreation in stone of a local type of compartmented wooden roof of which examples remain from the 15th century, including those at St Cuthbert's Church, Wells. The vaults of the aisles of the choir also have a unique pattern.

Until the early 14th century, the interior of the cathedral was in a unified style, but it was to undergo two significant changes, to the tower and to the eastern end. Between 1315 and 1322 the central tower was heightened and topped by a spire, which caused the piers that supported it to show signs of stress. In 1338 the mason William Joy employed an unorthodox solution by inserting low arches topped by inverted arches of similar dimensions, forming scissors-like structures. These arches brace the piers of the crossing on three sides, while the easternmost side is braced by a choir screen. The bracing arches are known as "St Andrew's Cross arches", in a reference to the patron saint of the cathedral. They have been described by Wim Swaan – rightly or wrongly – as "brutally massive" and intrusive in an otherwise restrained interior.

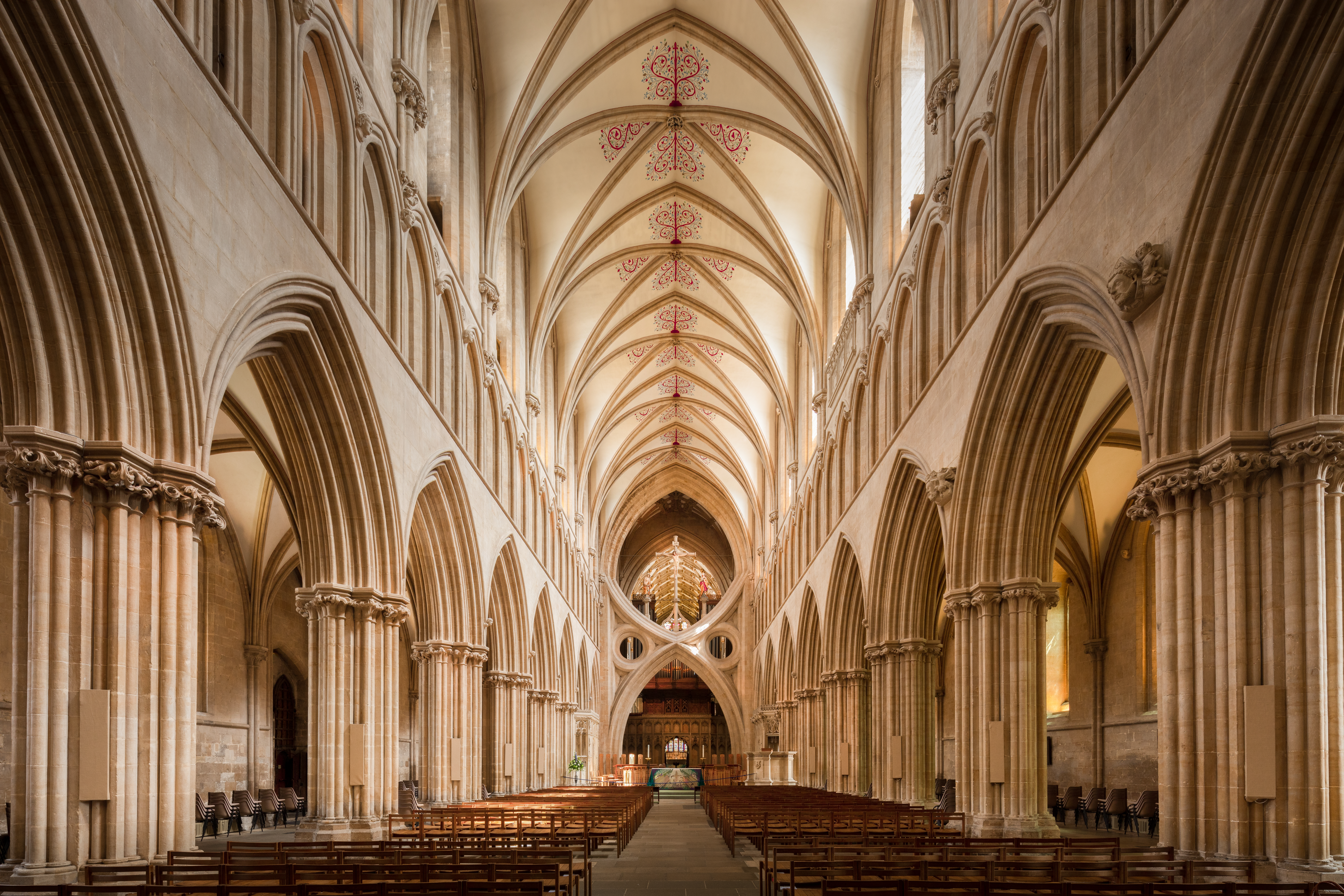
The horizontal line of the nave is emphasised by the unbroken galleries.

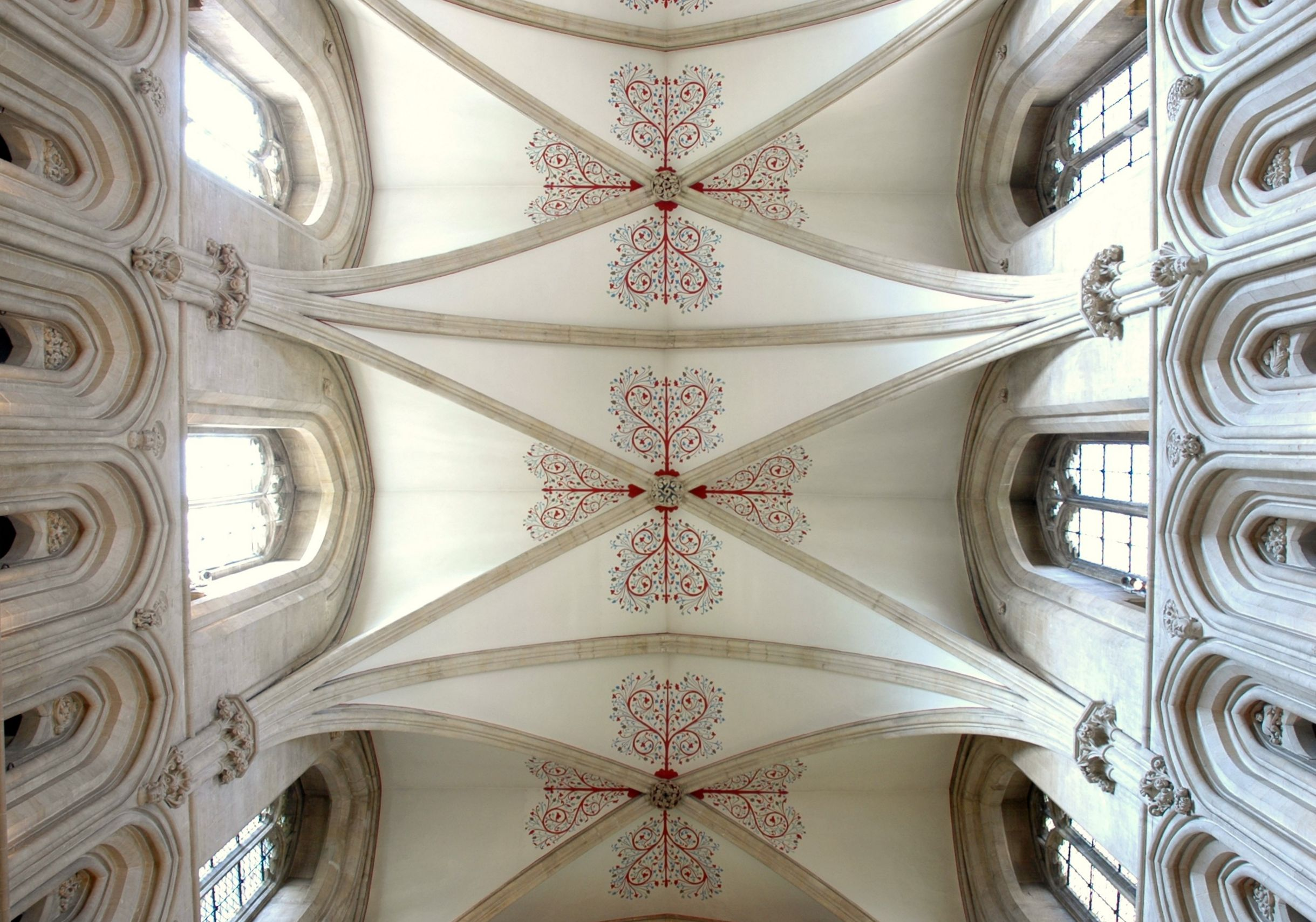
The quadripartite vault of the nave was decorated in the 19th century.

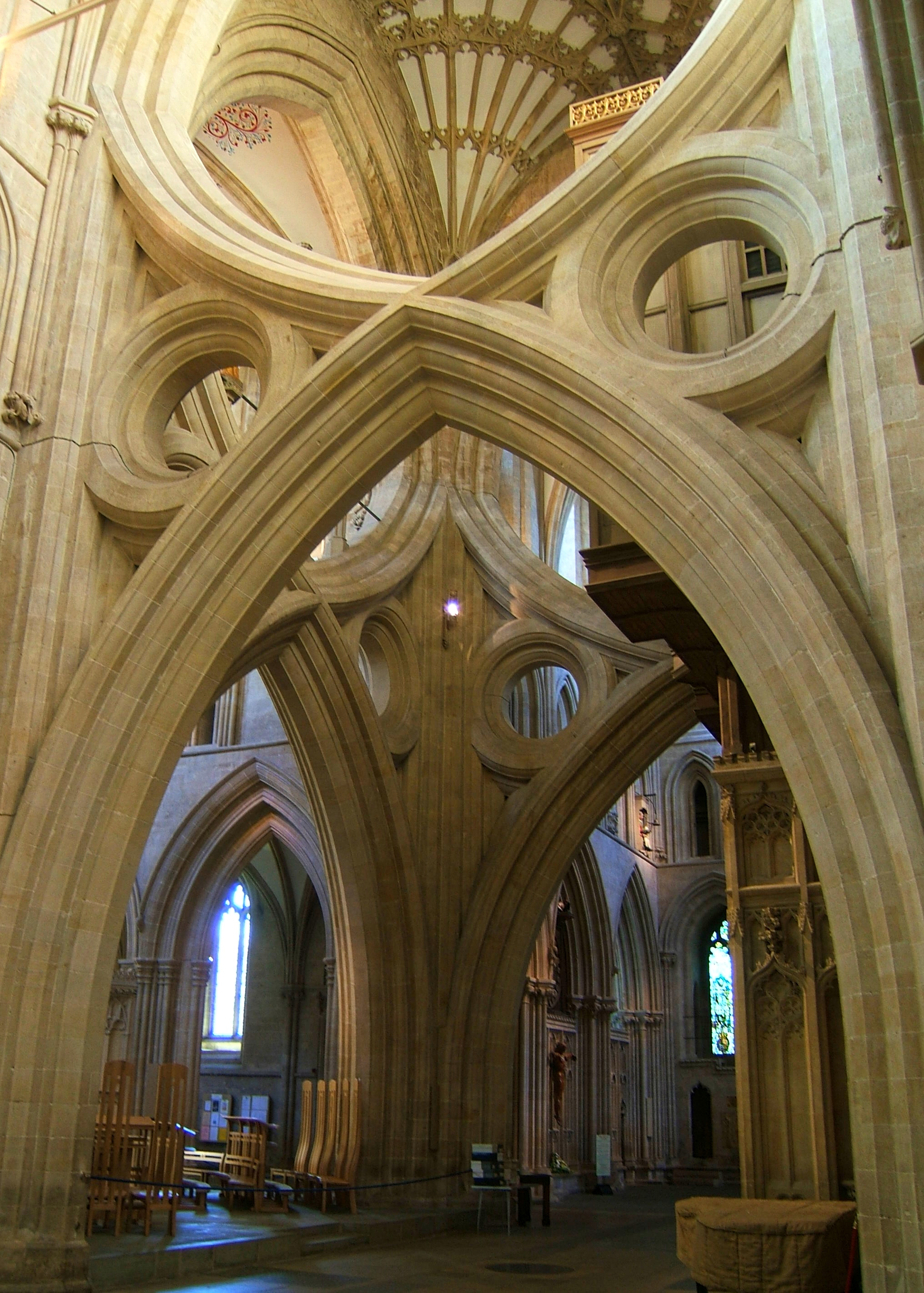
The St Andrew's Cross arches seen from the transept

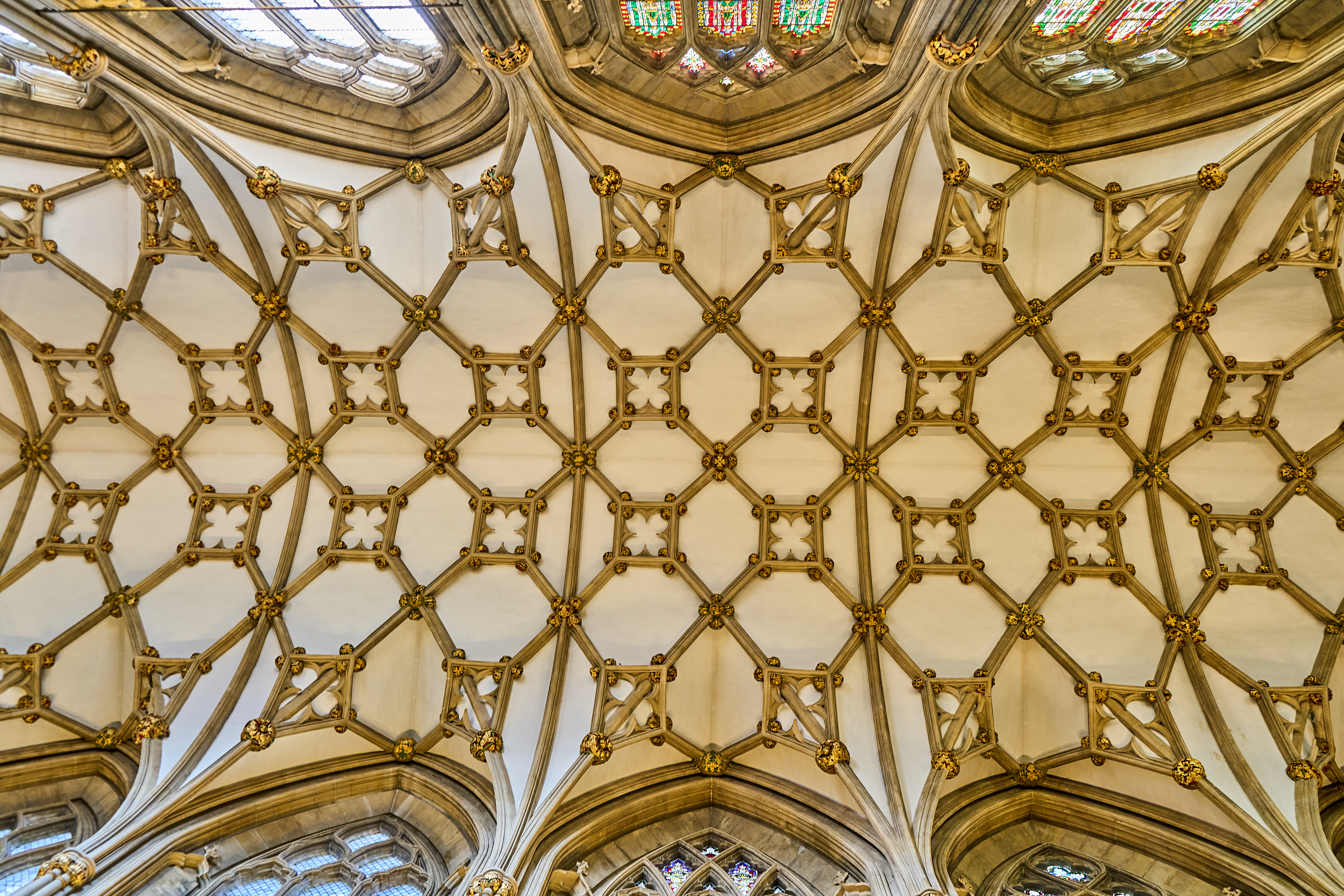
The vault of the choir has a unique form perhaps patterned on wooden roofs.

==== Lady Chapel and retrochoir ====
Wells Cathedral has a square east end to the choir, as is usual, and like several other cathedrals including Salisbury and Lichfield, has a lower Lady Chapel projecting at the eastern end, begun by Thomas Witney in about 1310, possibly before the chapter house was completed. The Lady Chapel seems to have begun as a free-standing structure in the form of an elongated octagon, but the plan changed and it was linked to the eastern end by extension of the choir and construction of a second transept or retrochoir east of the choir, probably by William Joy.

The Lady Chapel has a vault of complex and somewhat irregular pattern, as the chapel is not symmetrical about both axes. The main ribs are intersected by additional non-supporting, lierne ribs, which in this case form a star-shaped pattern at the apex of the vault. It is one of the earliest lierne vaults in England. There are five large windows, of which four are filled with fragments of medieval glass. The tracery of the windows is in the style known as Reticulated Gothic, having a pattern of a single repeated shape, in this case a trefoil, giving a "reticulate" or net-like appearance.

The retrochoir extends across the east end of the choir and into the east transepts. At its centre the vault is supported by a remarkable structure of angled piers. Two of these are placed as to complete the octagonal shape of the Lady Chapel, a solution described by Francis Bond as "an intuition of Genius". The piers have attached shafts of marble, and, with the vaults that they support, create a vista of great complexity from every angle. The windows of the retrochoir are in the Reticulated style like those of the Lady Chapel, but are fully Flowing Decorated in that the tracery mouldings form ogival curves.

Eastern end of the cathedral, 1310–45

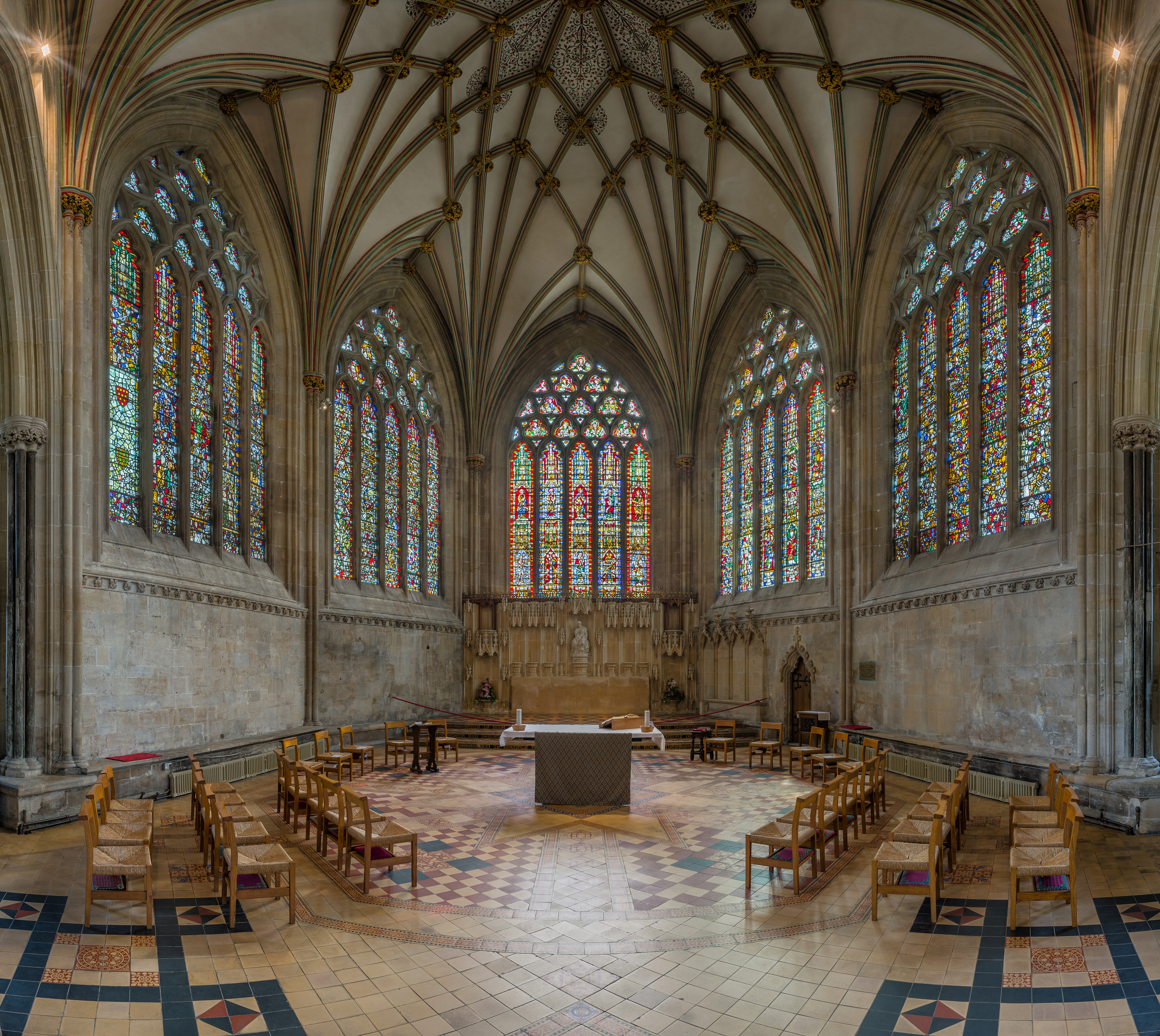
The Lady Chapel was probably designed by Thomas Witney, (1310–19). The windows have tracery of a regular net-like pattern and contain ancient stained glass.

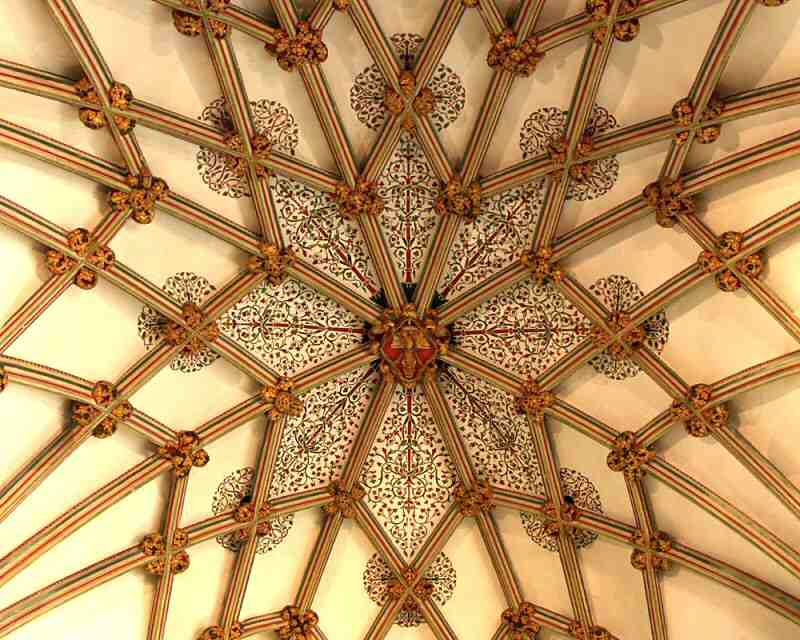
The stellar vault of the Lady Chapel has lierne ribs making a star within a star.

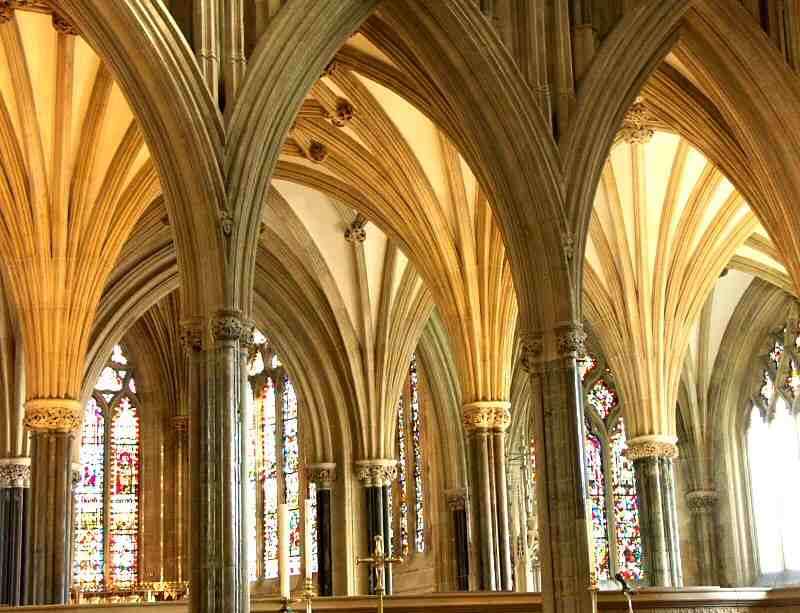
The view through William Joy's retrochoir into the Lady Chapel has been described as "one of the most subtle and entrancing architectural prospects in Europe".

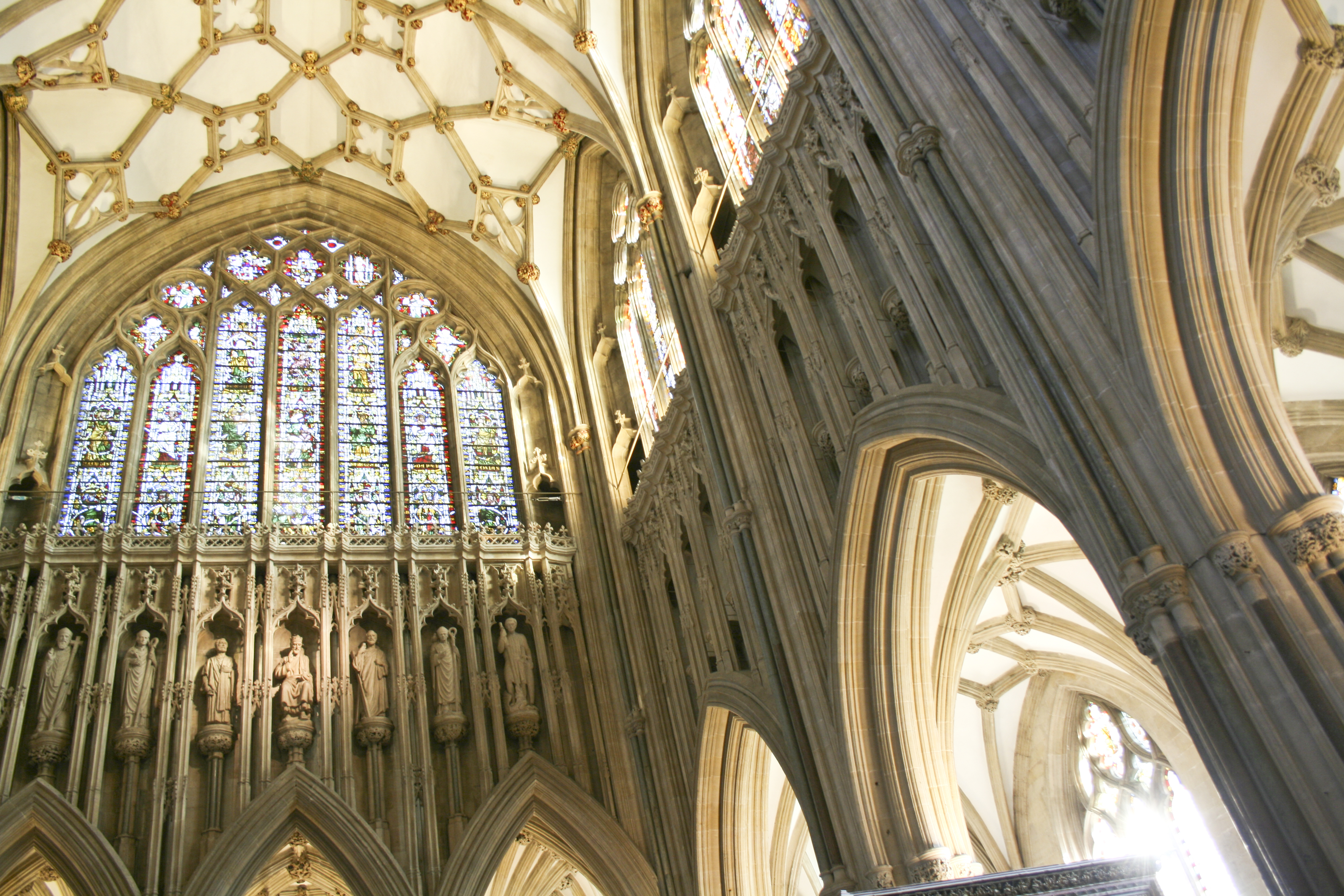
The eastern bays of the choir (1329–45) showing the reticular vault and the gallery of saints beneath the east window

==== Chapter house ====
The chapter house was begun in the late 13th century and built in two stages, completed about 1310. It is a two-storeyed structure with the main chamber raised on an undercroft. It is entered from a staircase which divides and turns, one branch leading through the upper storey of Chain Gate to Vicars' Close. The Decorated interior is described by Alec Clifton-Taylor as "architecturally the most beautiful in England". It is octagonal, with its ribbed vault supported on a central column. The column is surrounded by shafts of Purbeck Marble, rising to a single continuous rippling foliate capital of stylised oak leaves and acorns, quite different in character from the Early English stiff-leaf foliage. Above the moulding spring 32 ribs of strong profile, giving an effect generally likened to "a great palm tree". The windows are large with Geometric Decorated tracery that is beginning to show an elongation of form, and ogees in the lesser lights that are characteristic of Flowing Decorated tracery. The tracery lights still contain ancient glass. Beneath the windows are 51 stalls, the canopies of which are enlivened by carvings including many heads carved in a light-hearted manner.

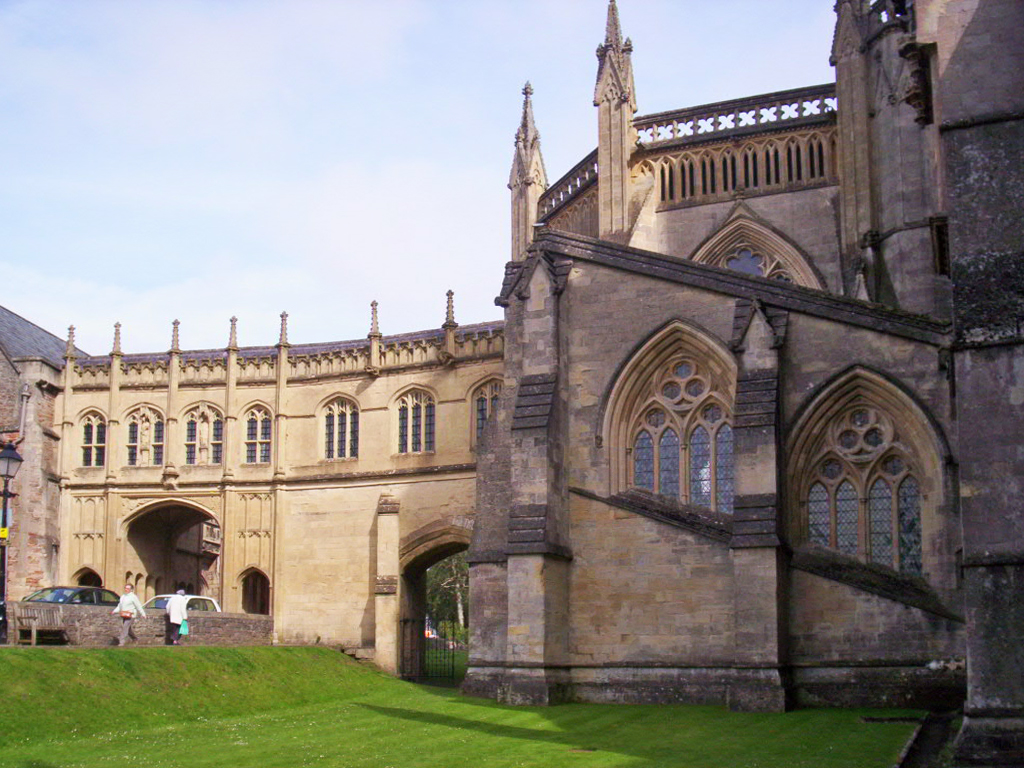
A staircase leads from the cathedral (right) to the chapter house and the Chain Gate which gives access to Vicars' Close.

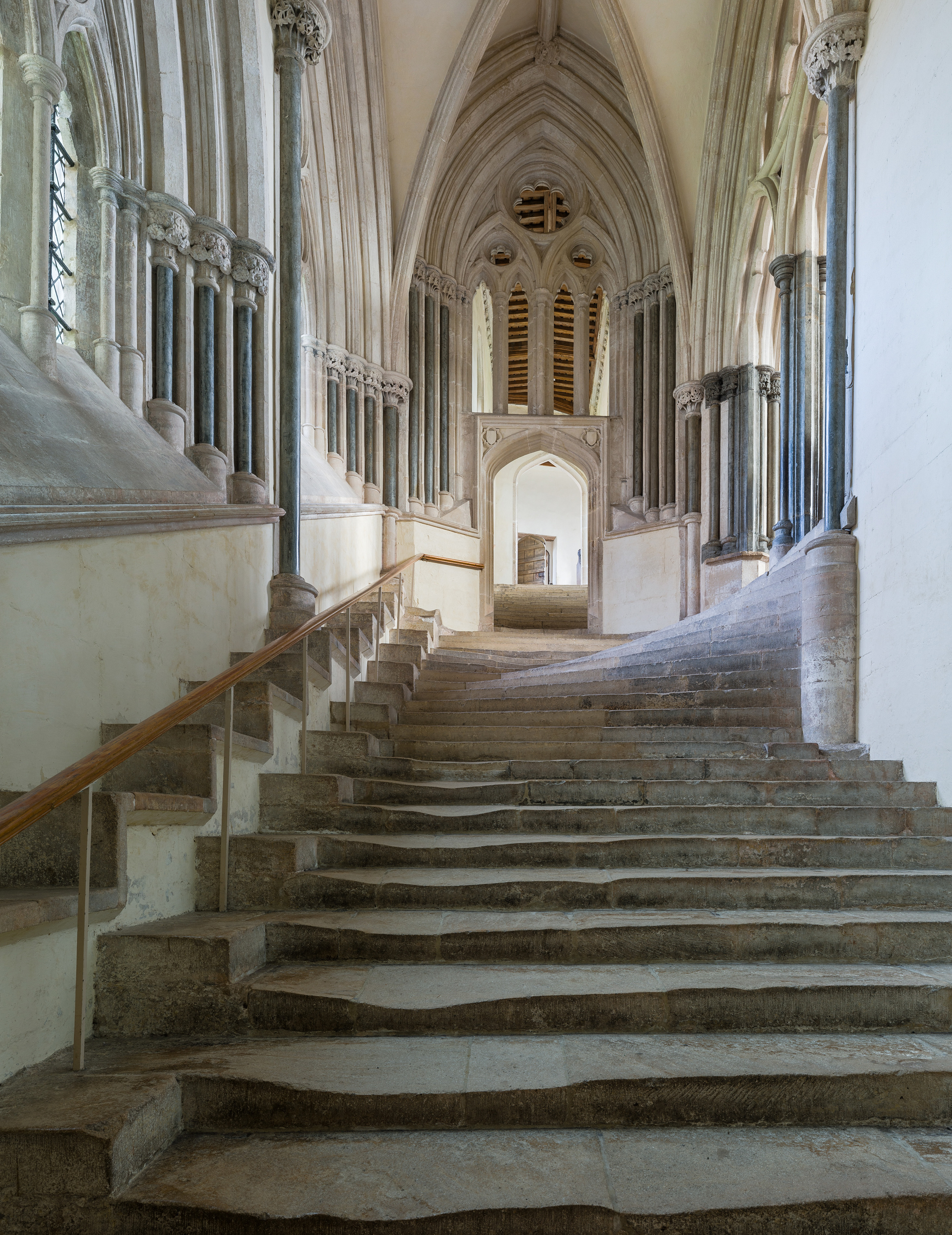
The stairs to the chapter house and Vicars' Close

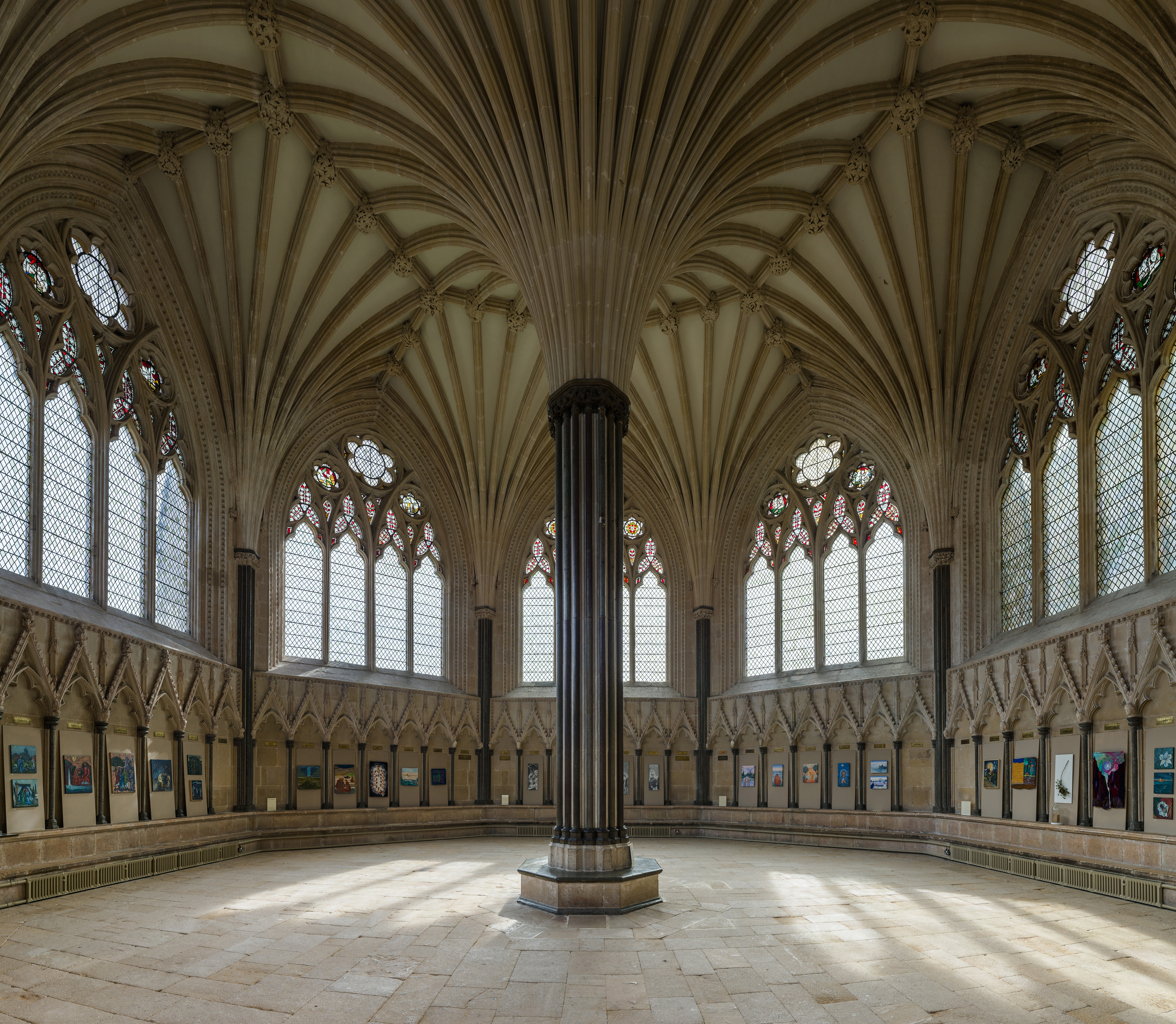
The chapter house is off the staircase to the right. Its central column and vault are often likened to a palm tree. The walls of the chapter house have fifty-one niches for seating.

== Art and treasures ==
=== Stained glass ===
Wells Cathedral contains one of the most substantial collections of medieval stained glass in England, despite damage by Parliamentary troops in 1642 and 1643. The oldest surviving glass dates from the late 13th century and is in two windows on the west side of the chapter-house staircase. Two windows in the south choir aisle are from 1310 to 1320.

The Lady Chapel has five windows, of which four date from 1325 to 1330 and include images of a local saint, Dunstan. The east window was restored to a semblance of its original appearance by Thomas Willement in 1845. The other windows have complete canopies, but the pictorial sections are fragmented.

The east window of the choir is a broad, seven-light window dating from 1340 to 1345. It depicts the Tree of Jesse (the genealogy of Christ) and demonstrates the use of silver staining, a new technique that allowed the artist to paint details on the glass in yellow, as well as black. The combination of yellow and green glass and the application of the bright yellow stain gives the window its popular name, the "Golden Window". It is flanked by two windows each side in the clerestory, with large figures of saints, also dated to 1340–45. In 2010 a major conservation programme was undertaken on the Jesse Tree window.

The panels in the chapel of St Katherine are attributed to Arnold of Nijmegen and date from about 1520. They were acquired from the destroyed church of Saint-Jean, Rouen, with the last panel having been purchased in 1953.

The large triple lancet to the nave west end was glazed at the expense of Dean Creighton at a cost of £140 in 1664. It was repaired in 1813, and the central light was largely replaced to a design by Archibald Keightley Nicholson between 1925 and 1931. The main north and south transept end windows by James Powell and Sons were erected in the early 20th century.

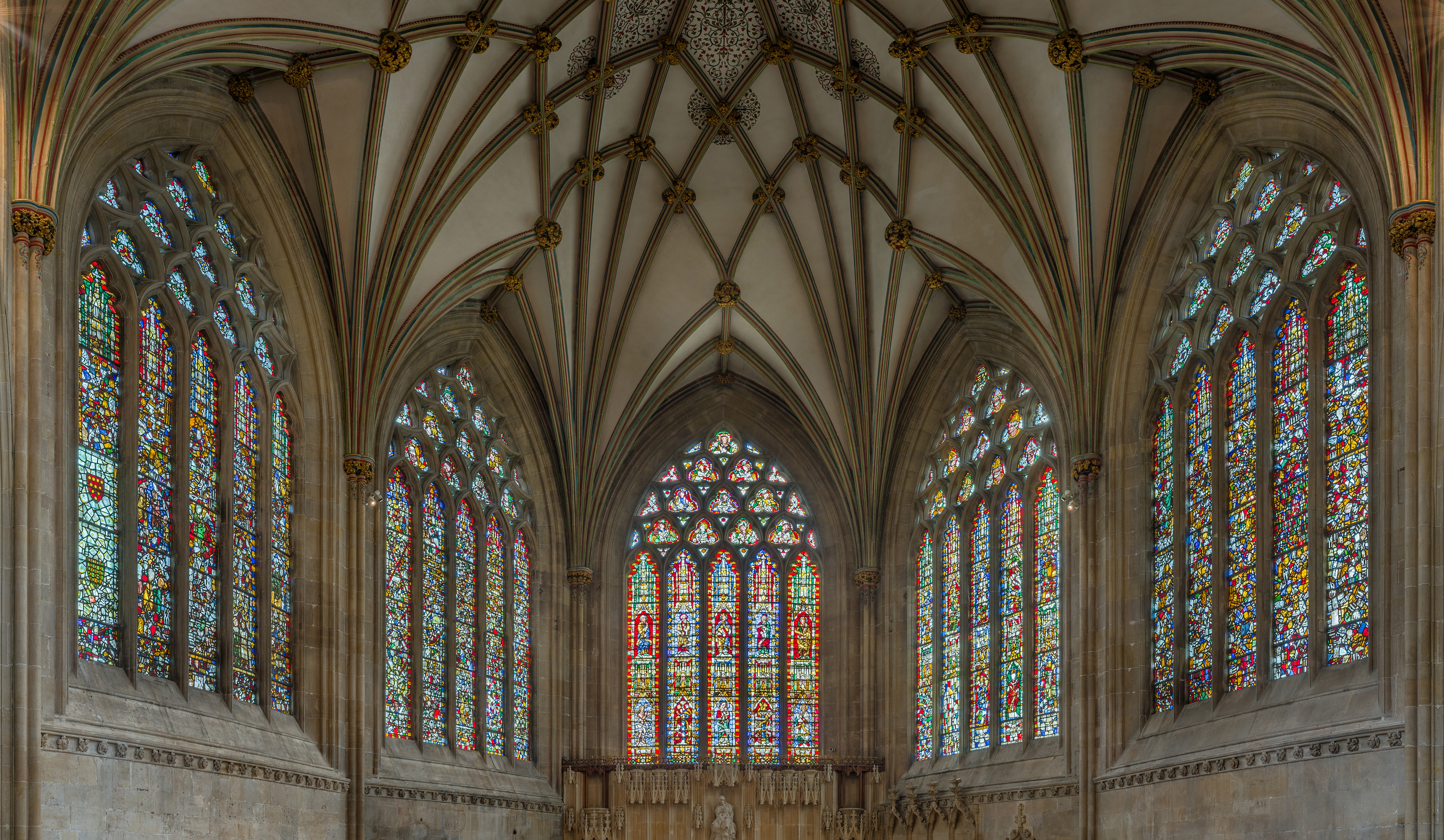
The five windows of the Lady Chapel contain medieval stained glass, mostly fragmentary, except for the central window.

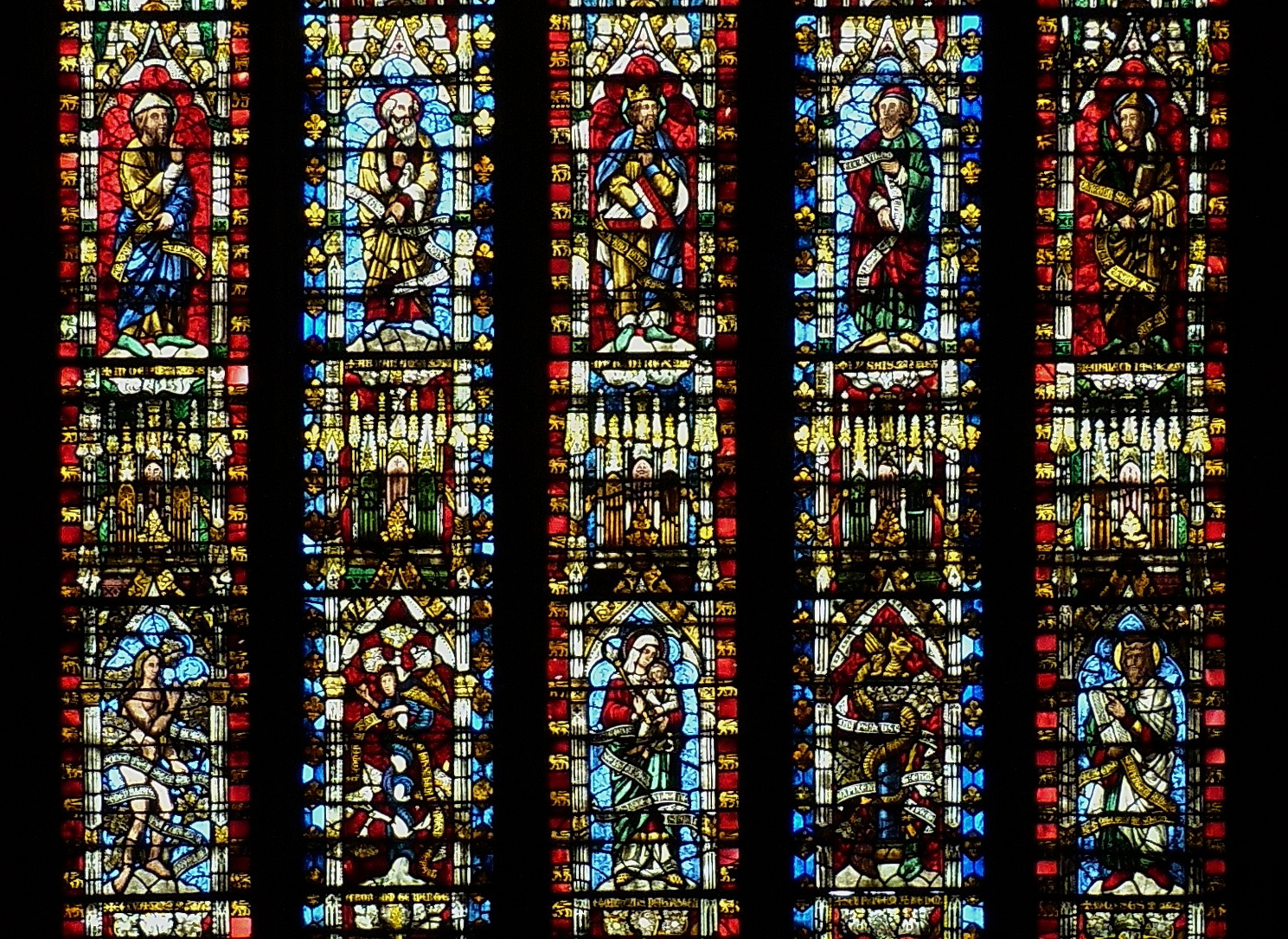
This early 14th-century eastern window was heavily restored in the 19th century.

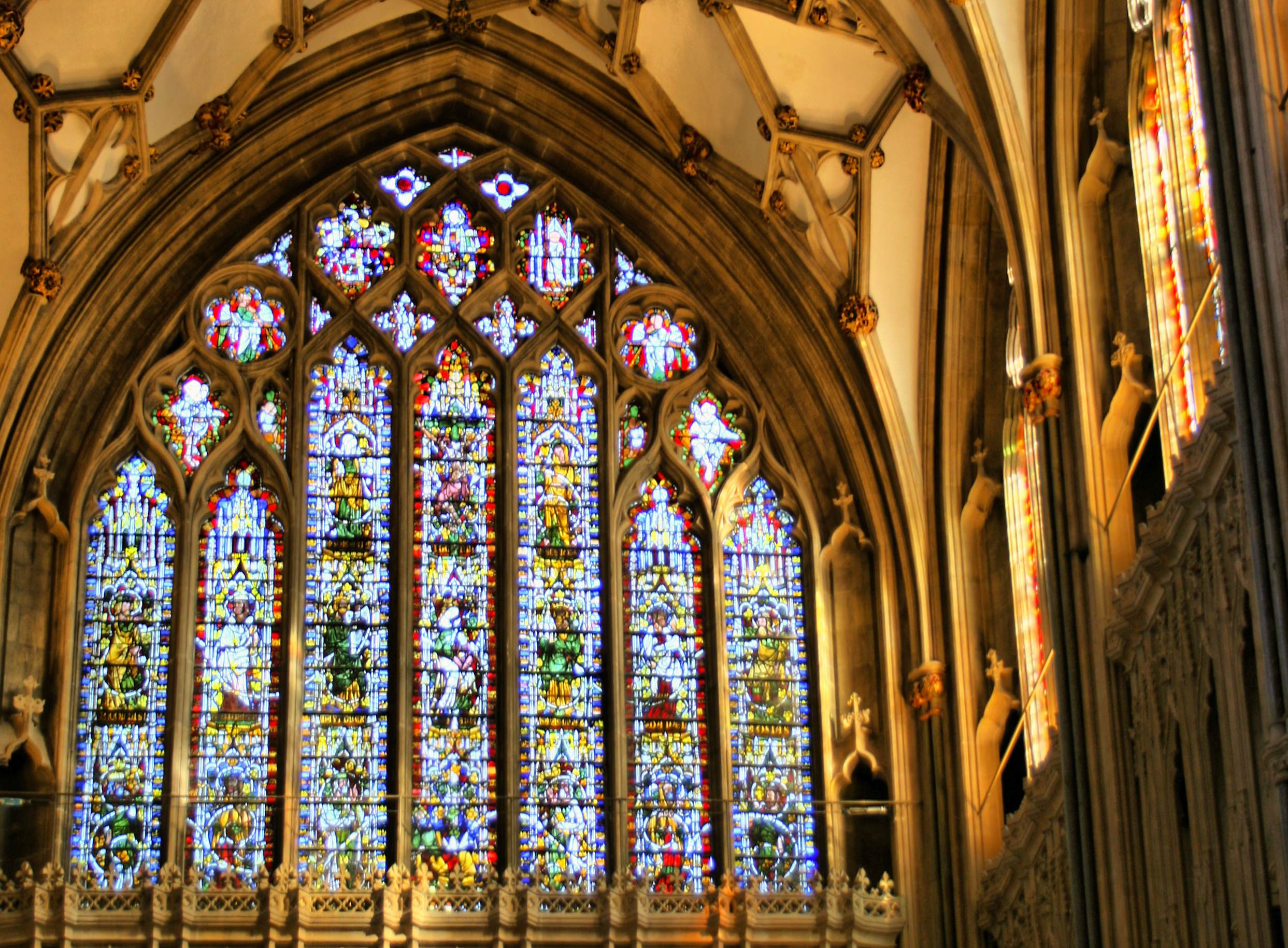
The Golden Window at the east end of the choir depicting the Tree of Jesse

=== Carvings ===
The greater part of the stone carving of Wells Cathedral comprises foliate capitals in the stiff-leaf style. They are found ornamenting the piers of the nave, choir and transepts. Stiff-leaf foliage is highly abstract. Though possibly influenced by carvings of acanthus leaves or vine leaves, it cannot be easily identified with any particular plant. Here the carving of the foliage is varied and vigorous, the springing leaves and deep undercuts casting shadows that contrast with the surface of the piers. In the transepts and towards the crossing in the nave the capitals have many small figurative carvings among the leaves. These include a man with toothache and a series of four scenes depicting the "Wages of Sin" in a narrative of fruit stealers who creep into an orchard and are then beaten by the farmer. Another well-known carving is in the north transept aisle: a foliate corbel, on which climbs a lizard, sometimes identified as a salamander, a symbol of eternal life.

Carvings in the Decorated Gothic style may be found in the eastern end of the buildings, where there are many carved bosses. In the chapter house, the carvings of the 51 stalls include numerous small heads of great variety, many of them smiling or laughing. A well-known figure is the corbel of the dragon-slaying monk in the chapter house stair. The large continuous capital that encircles the central pillar of the chapter house is markedly different in style to the stiff-leaf of the Early English period. In contrast to the bold projections and undercutting of the earlier work, it has a rippling form and is clearly identifiable as grapevine.

The 15th-century cloisters have many small bosses ornamenting the vault. Two in the west cloister, near the gift shop and café, have been called sheela na gigs, i. e. female figures displaying their genitals and variously judged to depict the sin of lust or stem from ancient fertility cults.

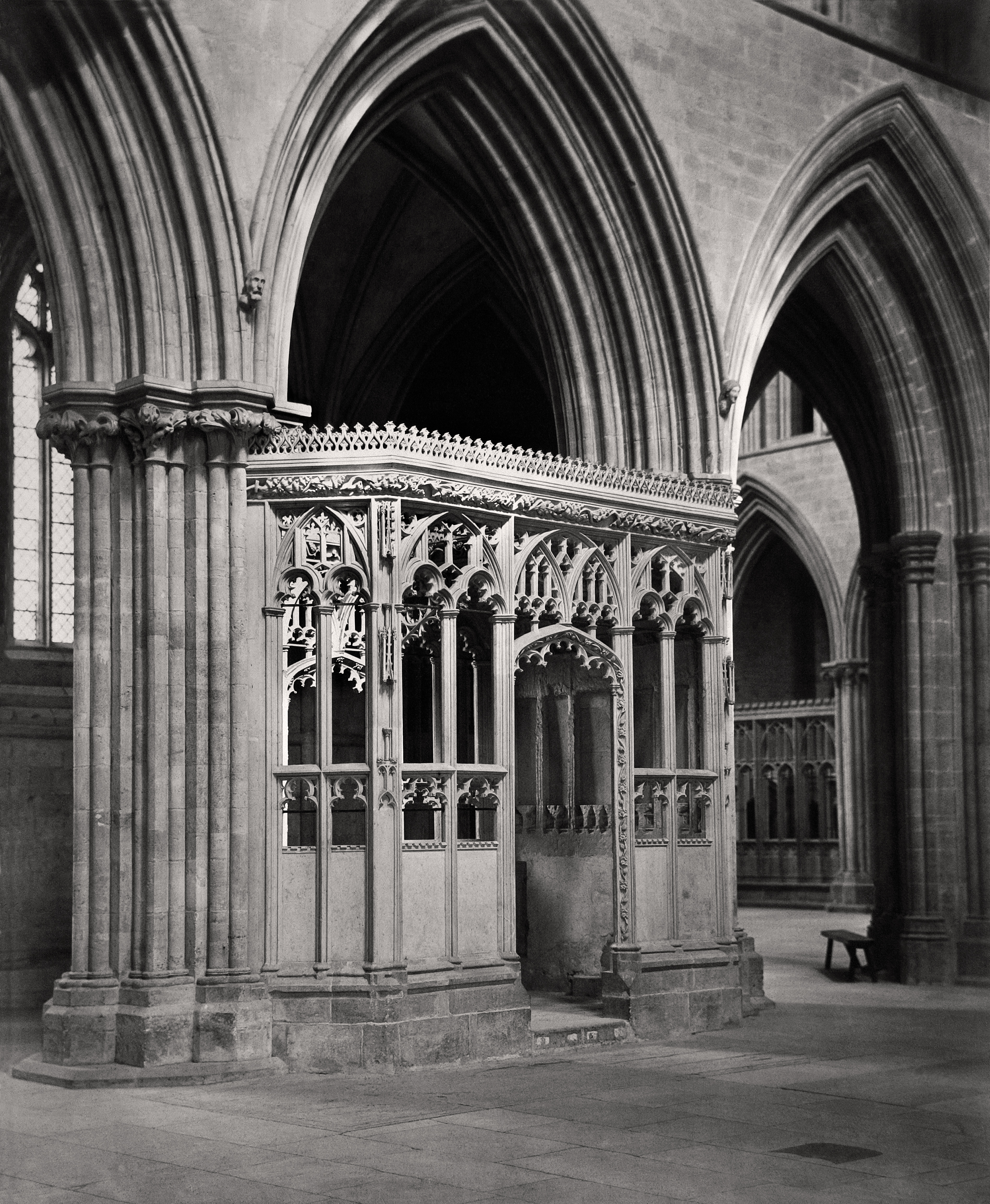
A chantry in the nave (photo Francis Bedford, 19th century)

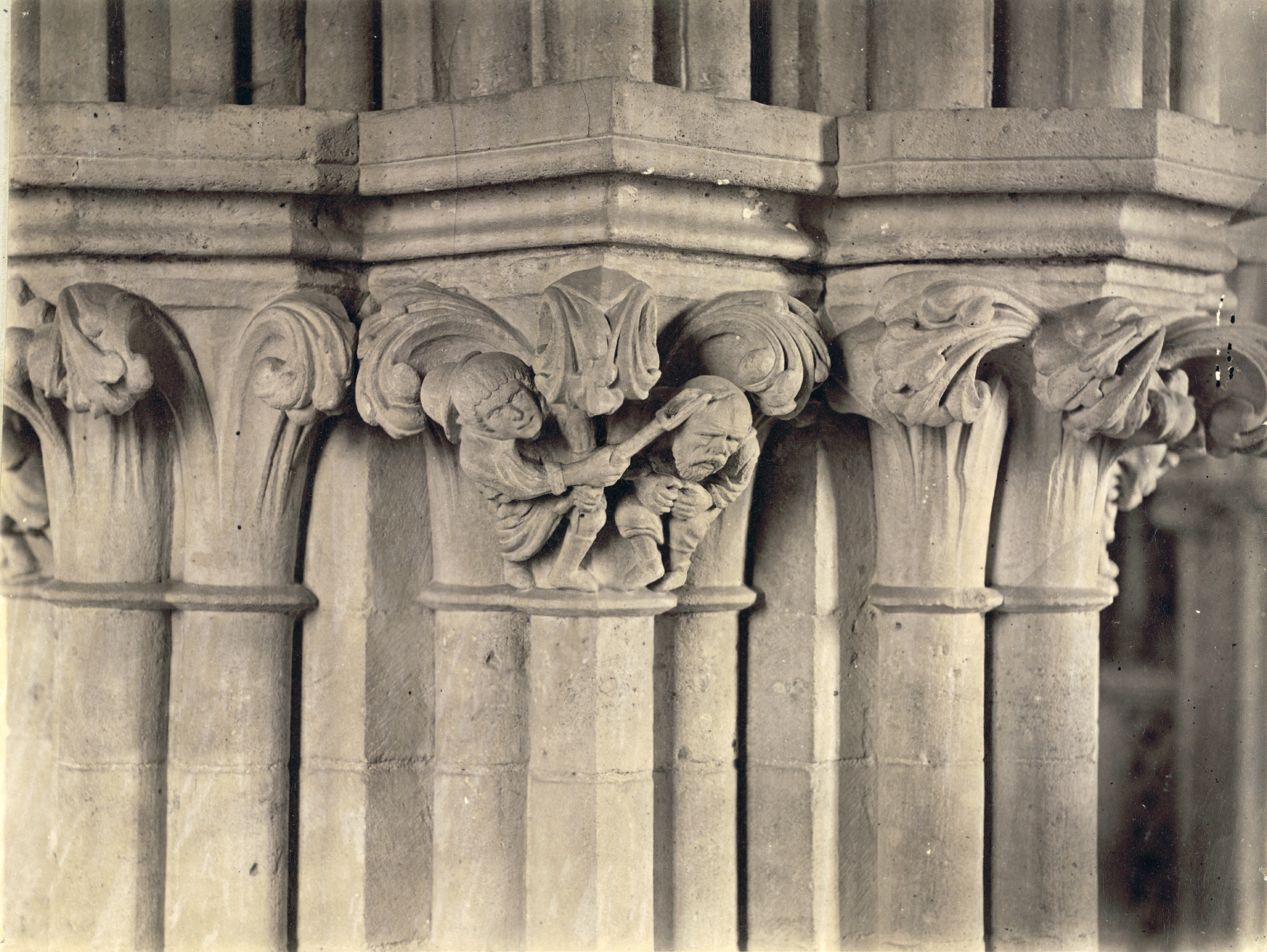
A capital in the narrative of the Fruit Stealers shows a farmer hitting a thief with a garden fork. (Albumen print, c. 1876–95)

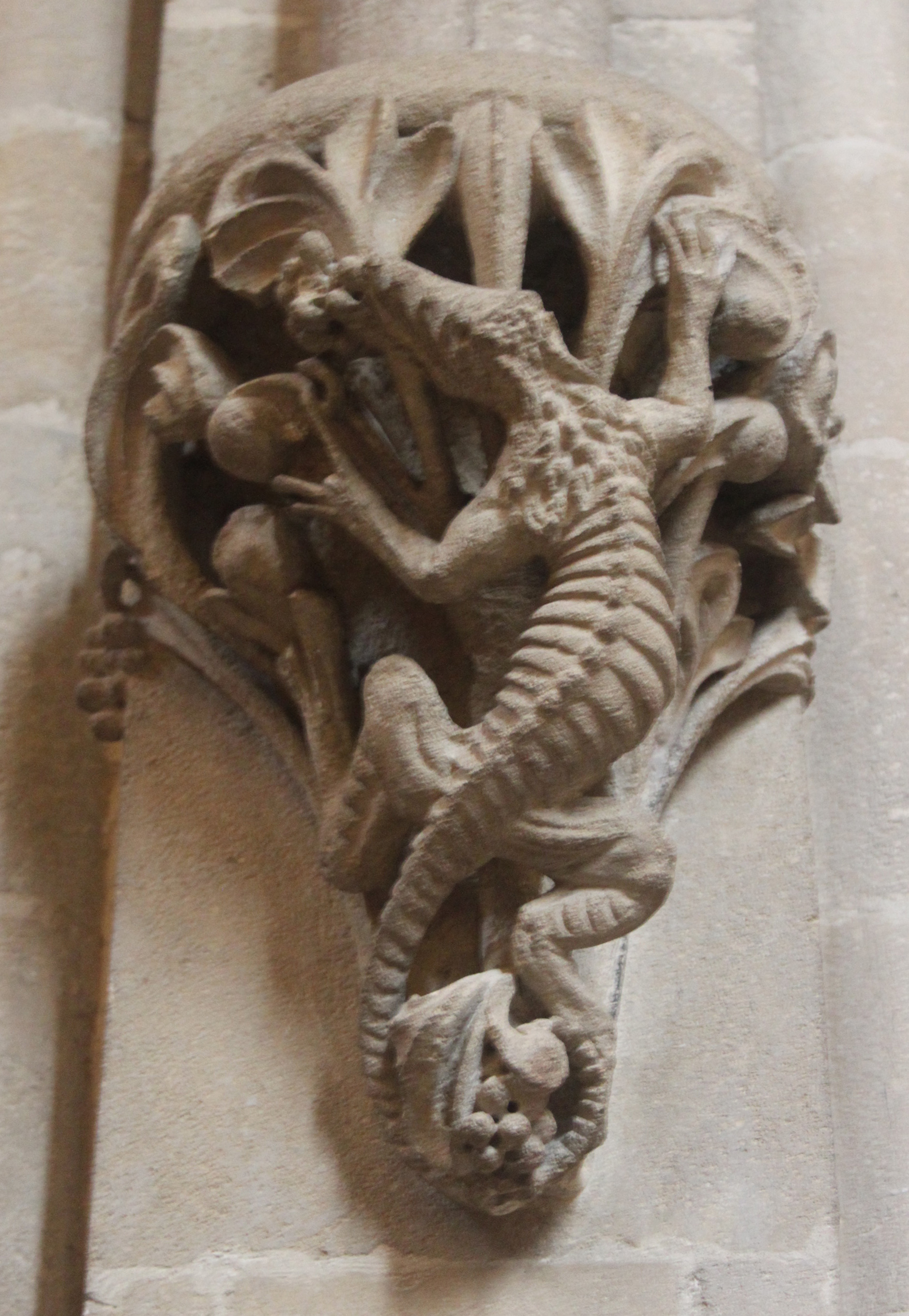
The salamander represents Eternal Life.

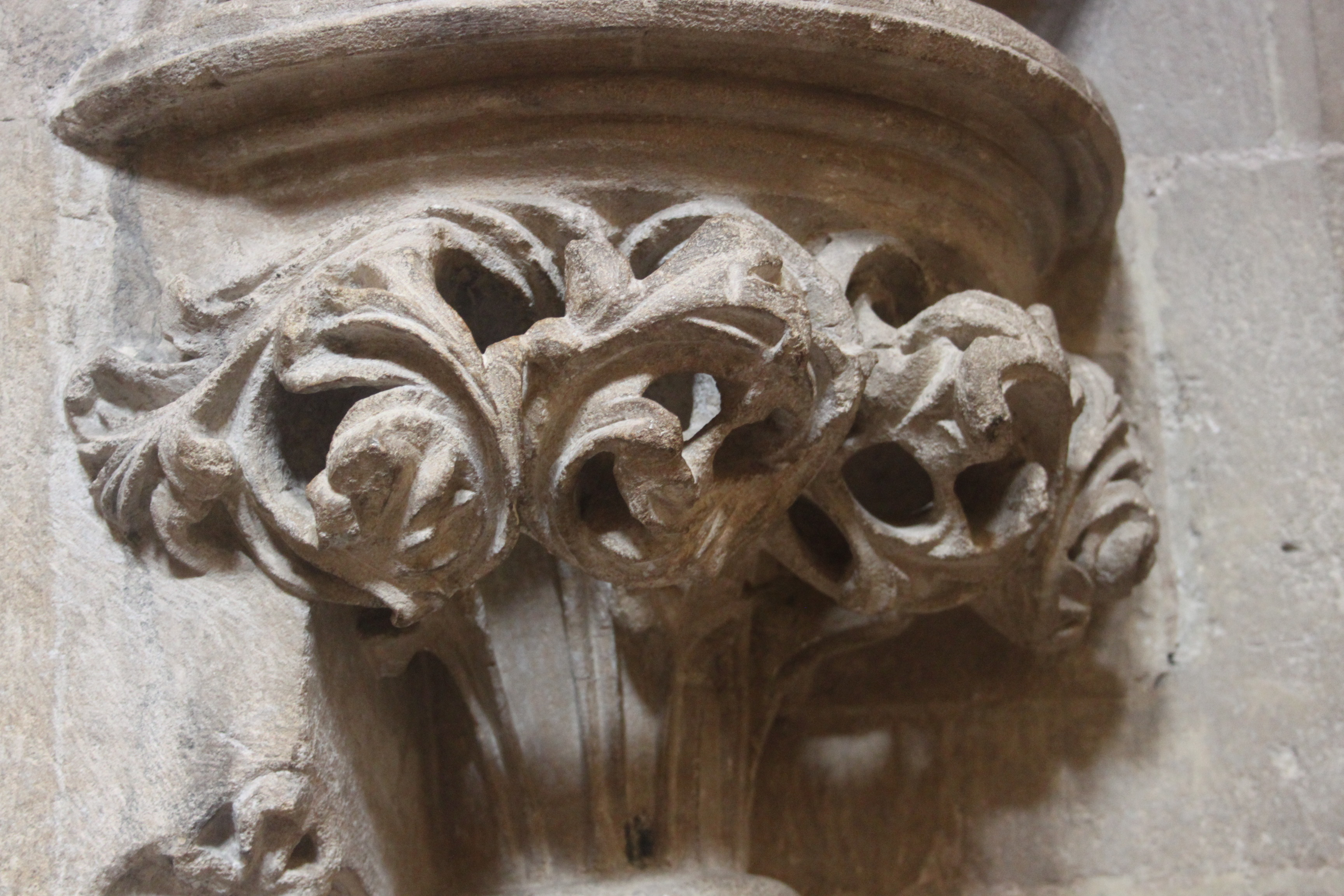
The stiff leaf foliage of the capitals is renowned.

==== Misericords ====
Wells Cathedral has one of the finest sets of misericords in Britain. Its clergy has a long tradition of singing or reciting from the Book of Psalms each day, along with the customary daily reading of the Holy Office. In medieval times the clergy assembled in the church eight times daily for the canonical hours. As the greater part of the services was recited while standing, many monastic or collegiate churches fitted stalls whose seats tipped up to provide a ledge for the monk or cleric to lean against. These were "misericords" because their installation was an act of mercy. Misericords typically have a carved figurative bracket beneath the ledge framed by two floral motifs known, in heraldic manner, as "supporters".

The misericords date from 1330 to 1340. They may have been carved under the direction of Master Carpenter John Strode, although his name is not recorded before 1341. He was assisted by Bartholomew Quarter, who is documented from 1343. They originally numbered 90, of which 65 have survived. Sixty-one are installed in the choir, three are displayed in the cathedral, and one is held by the Victoria and Albert Museum. New stalls were ordered when the eastern end of the choir was extended in the early 14th century. The canons complained that they had borne the cost of the rebuilding and ordered the prebendary clerics to pay for their own stalls. When the newly refurbished choir opened in 1339 many misericords were left unfinished, including one-fifth of the surviving 65. Many of the clerics had not paid, having been called to contribute a total sum of £200. The misericords survived better than the other sections of the stalls, which during the Protestant Reformation had their canopies chopped off and galleries inserted above them. One misericord, showing a boy pulling a thorn from his foot, dates from the 17th century. In 1848 came a complete rearrangement of the choir furniture, and 61 of the misericords were reused in the restructured stalls.

The subject matter of the carvings of the central brackets as misericords varies, but many themes recur in different churches. Typically the themes are less unified or directly related to the Bible and Christian theology than small sculptures seen elsewhere within churches, such as bosses. This applies at Wells, where none of the misericord carvings is directly based on a Bible story. The subjects, chosen either by the woodcarver, or perhaps by the one paying for the stall, have no overriding theme. The sole unifying elements are the roundels on each side of the pictorial subject, which all show elaborately carved foliage, in most cases formal and stylised in the later Decorated manner, but with several examples of naturalistic foliage, including roses and bindweed. Many of the subjects carry traditional interpretations. The image of the "Pelican in her Piety" (believed to feed her young on her own blood) is a recognised symbol for Christ's love for the Church. A cat playing with a mouse may represent the Devil snaring a human soul. Other subjects illustrate popular fables or sayings such as "When the fox preaches, look to your geese". Many depict animals, some of which may symbolise a human vice or virtue, or an aspect of faith.

Twenty-seven of the carvings depict animals: rabbits, dogs, a puppy biting a cat, a ewe feeding a lamb, monkeys, lions, bats, and the Early Christian motif of two doves drinking from an ewer. Eighteen have mythological subjects, including mermaids, dragons and wyverns. Five are clearly narrative, such as the Fox and the Geese, and the story of Alexander the Great being raised to Heaven by griffins. There are three heads: a bishop in a mitre, an angel, and a woman wearing a veil over hair arranged in coils over each ear. Eleven carvings show human figures, among which are several of remarkable design, conceived by the artist specifically for their purpose of supporting a shelf. One figure lies beneath the seat, supporting the shelf with a cheek, a hand and a foot. Another sits in a contorted manner supporting the weight on his elbow, while a further figure squats with his knees wide apart and a strained look on his face.

Misericords

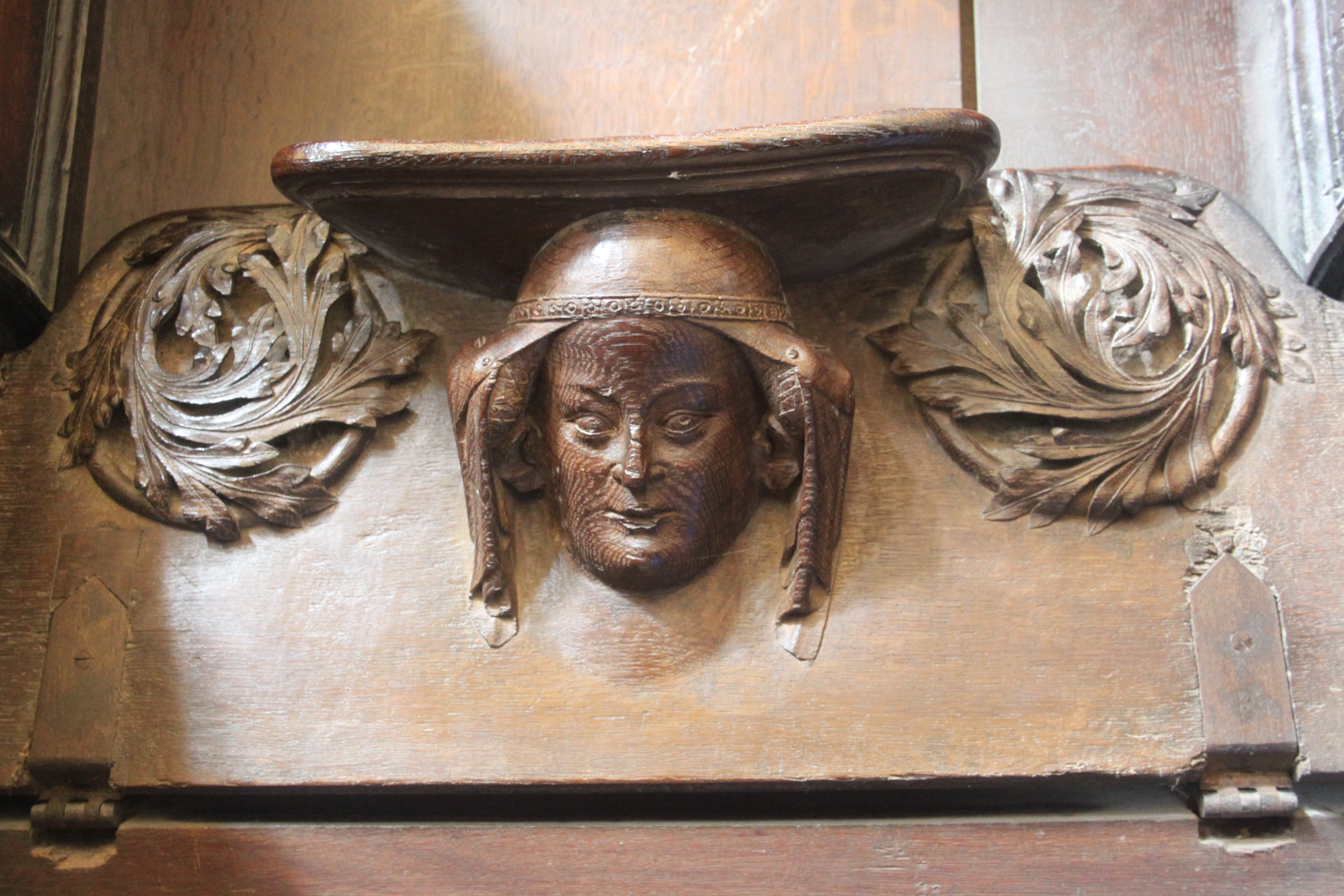
One of several misericords showing heads

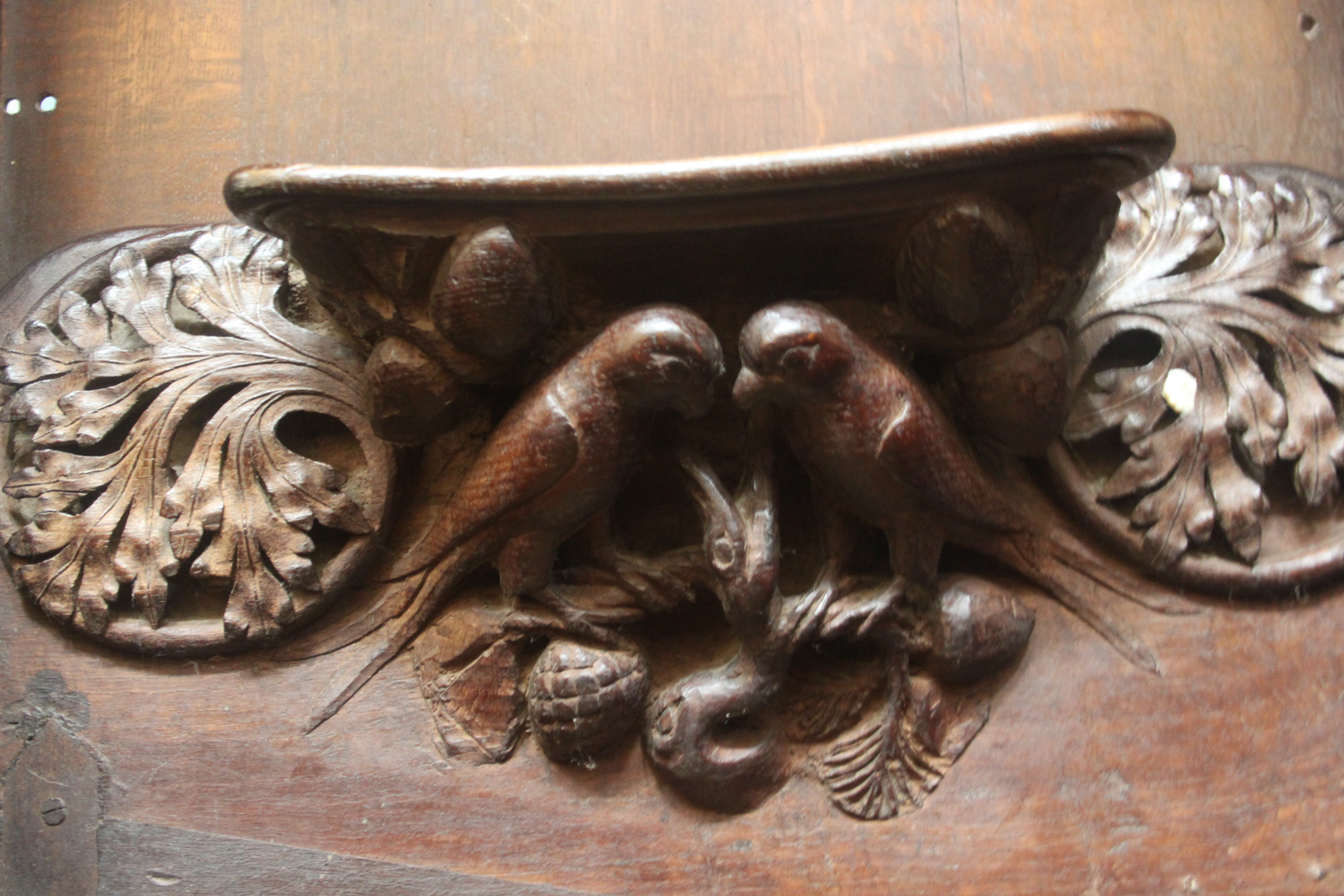
A pair of parakeets in a pine tree

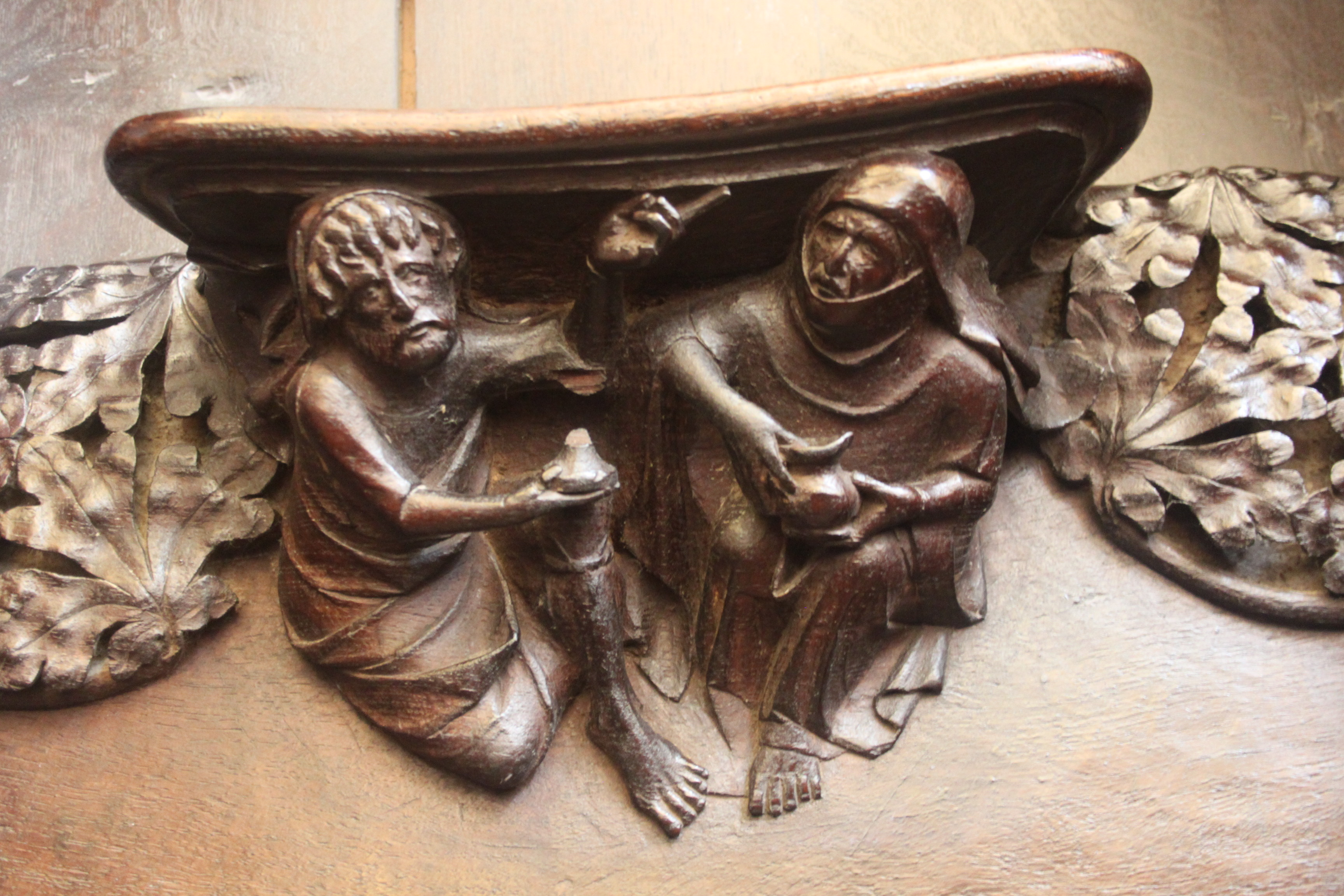
A couple sharing a jug of wine

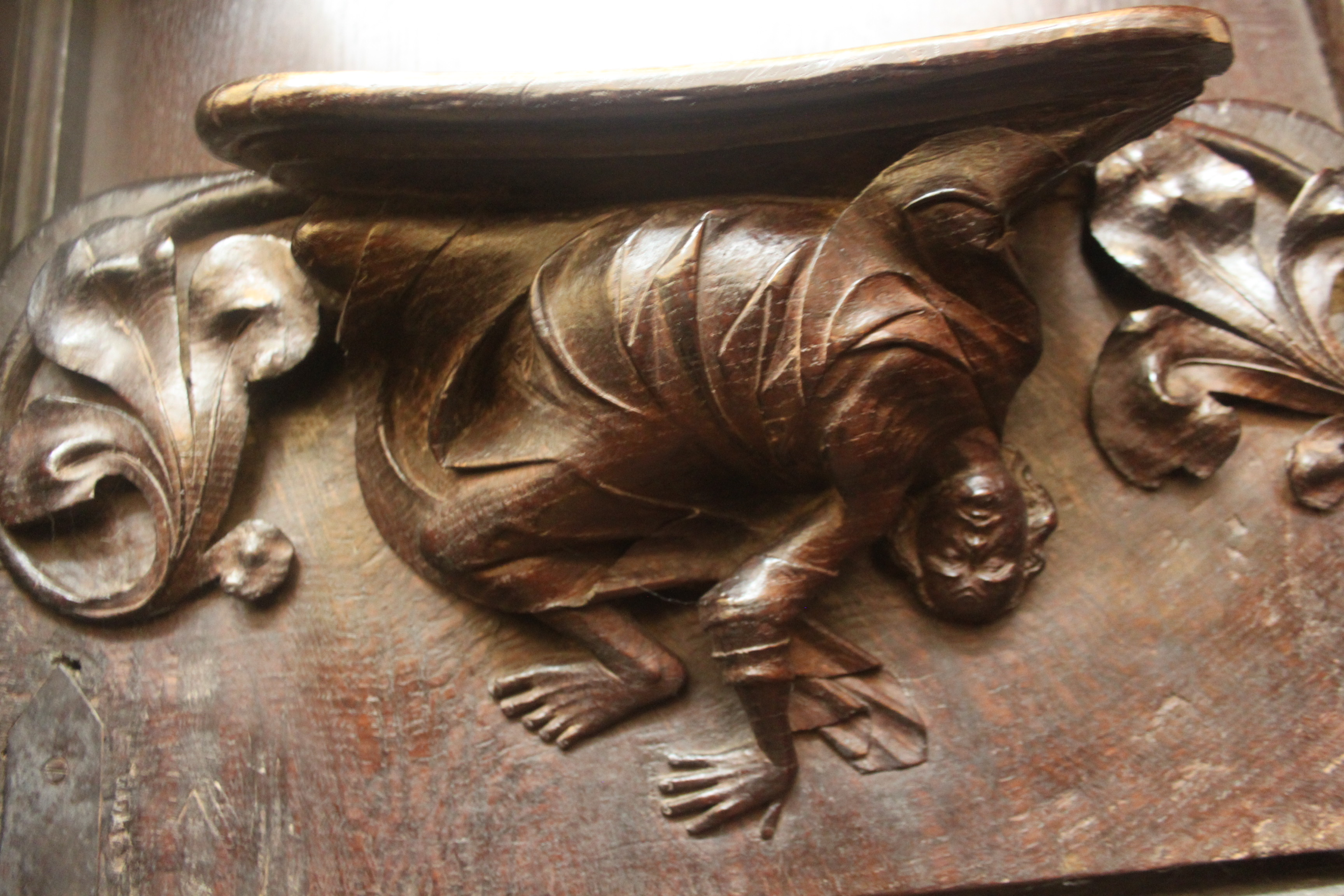
One of several misericords showing contorted figures

=== Fittings and monuments ===
Some of the cathedral's fittings and monuments are hundreds of years old. The round font in the south transept is from the former Saxon cathedral and has an arcade of round-headed arches, on a round plinth. The font cover was made in 1635 and is decorated with the heads of putti. The Chapel of St Martin is a memorial to every Somerset man who fell in World War I. The bishop's throne dates from 1340, and has a panelled, canted front and stone doorway, and a deep nodding cusped ogee canopy above it, with three-stepped statue niches and pinnacles. The throne was restored by Anthony Salvin around 1850. The brass lectern in the Lady Chapel dates from 1661 and has a moulded stand and foliate crest. In the north transept chapel is a 17th-century oak screen with columns, formerly used in cow stalls, with artisan Ionic capitals and cornice, set forward over the chest tomb of John Godelee. There is a bound oak chest from the 14th century, which was used to store the chapter seal and key documents. Opposite the throne is a 19th-century octagonal pulpit on a coved base with panelled sides, and steps up from the north aisle.

The monuments and tombs include Gisa, bishop; † 1088; William of Bitton, bishop; † 1274; William of March, bishop; † 1302; John Droxford; † 1329; John Godelee; † 1333; John Middleton, died †1350; Ralph of Shrewsbury, died †; John Harewell, bishop; † 1386; William Bykonyll; † c. 1448; John Bernard; † 1459; Thomas Beckington; † died 1464; John Gunthorpe; † 1498; John Still; † 1607; Robert Creighton; † 1672; Richard Kidder, bishop; † 1703; George Hooper, bishop; † 1727 and Arthur Harvey, bishop; † 1894.

=== Clock ===
In the north transept is Wells Cathedral clock, an astronomical clock from about 1325 believed to be by Peter Lightfoot, a monk of Glastonbury. Its mechanism, dated between 1386 and 1392, was replaced in the 19th century and the original moved to the Science Museum in London, where it still operates. It is the second oldest surviving clock in England after the Salisbury Cathedral clock.

The clock has its original medieval face. Apart from the time on a 24-hour dial, it shows the motion of the Sun and Moon, the phases of the Moon, and the time since the last new Moon. The astronomical dial presents a geocentric or pre-Copernican view, with the Sun and Moon revolving round a central fixed Earth, like that of the clock at Ottery St Mary. The quarters are chimed by a quarter jack: a small automaton known as Jack Blandifers, who hits two bells with hammers and two with his heels. At the striking of the clock, jousting knights appear above the clock face.

On the outer wall of the transept, opposite Vicars' Hall, is a second clock face of the same clock, placed there just over seventy years after the interior clock and driven by the same mechanism. The second clock face has two quarter jacks (which strike on the quarter-hour) in the form of knights in armour.

In 2010 the official clock-winder retired and was replaced by an electric mechanism.

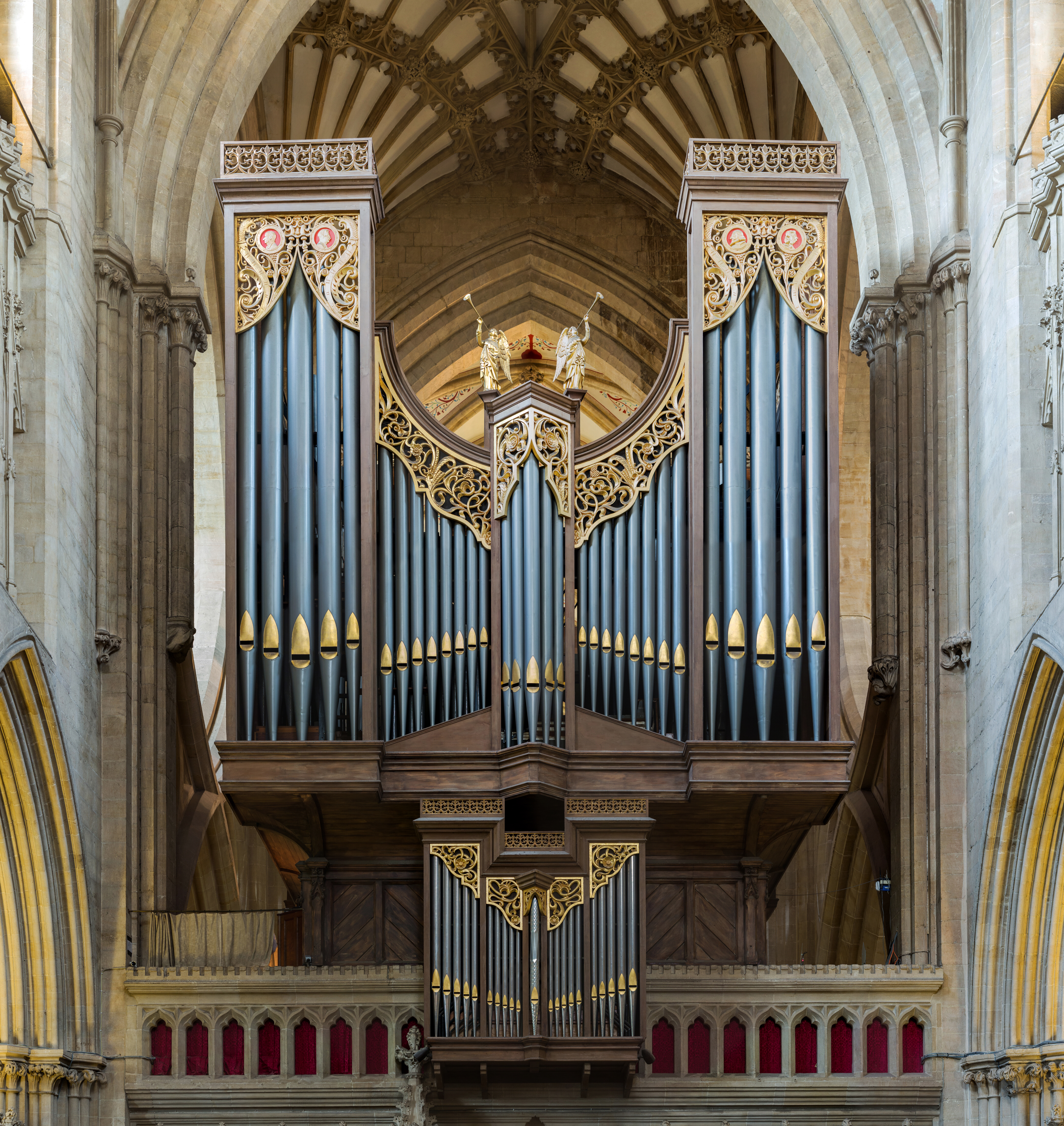
The organ, Harrison & Harrison (1909–10)

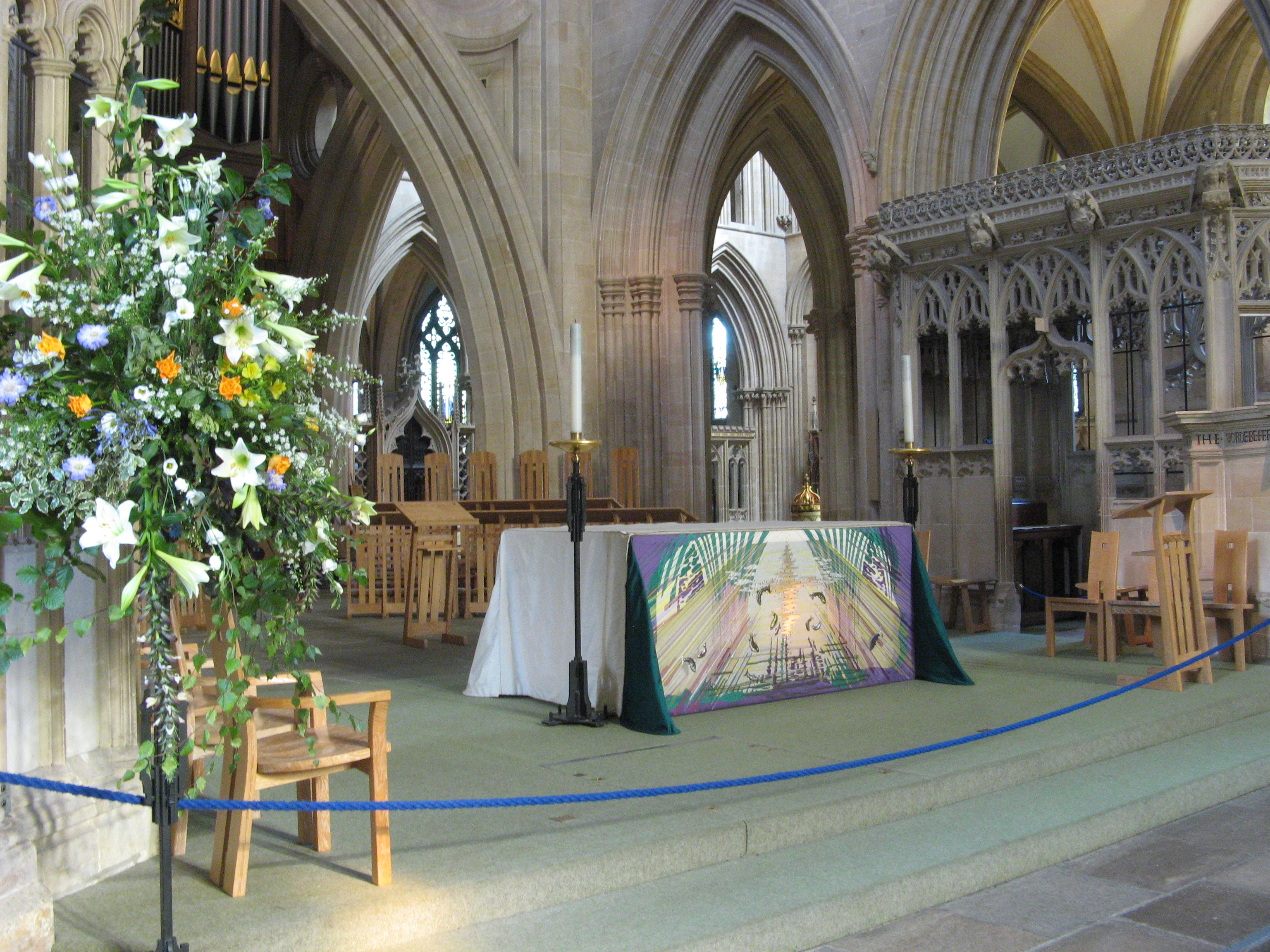
The altar and modern furnishings in the nave

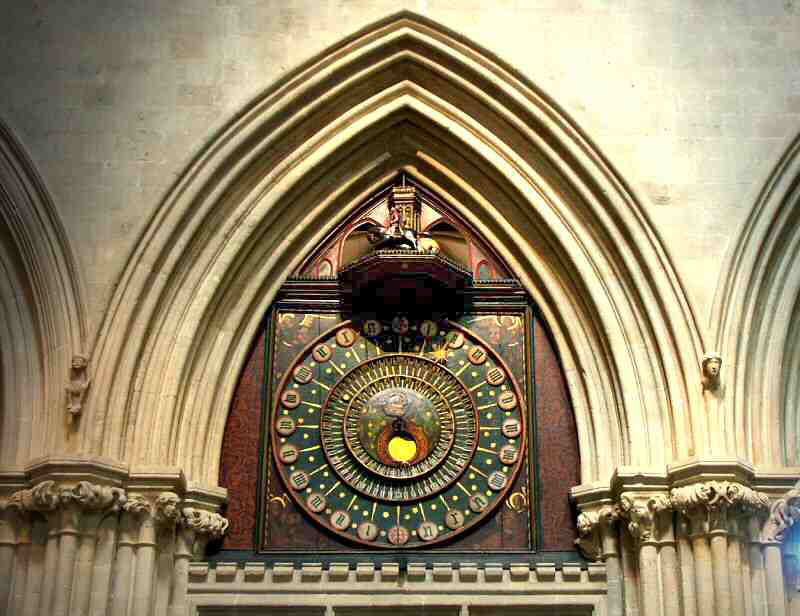
The internal dial of the astronomical clock

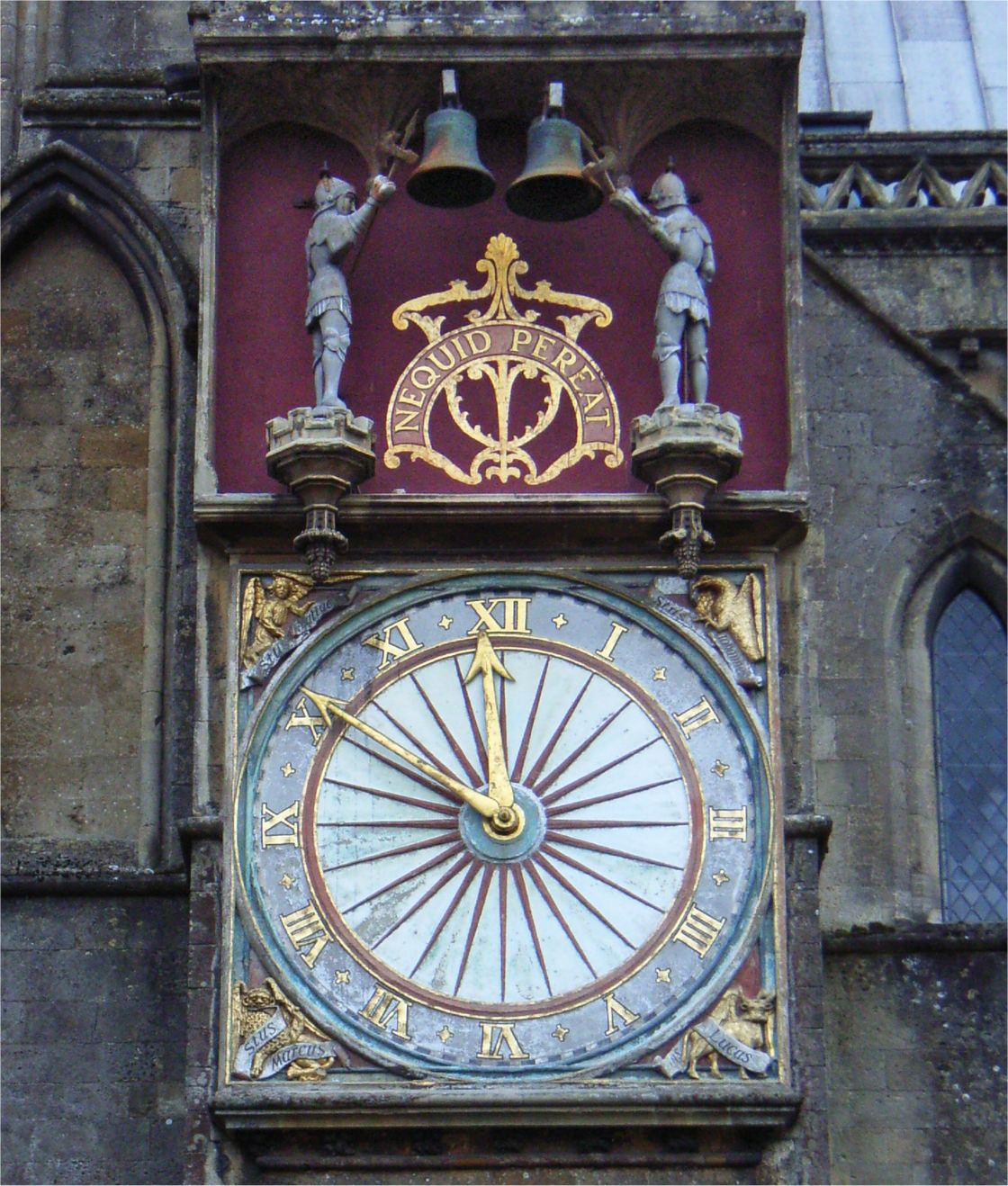
The outer dial and quarter-jacks on the north transept

== Music ==
=== Organ and organists ===
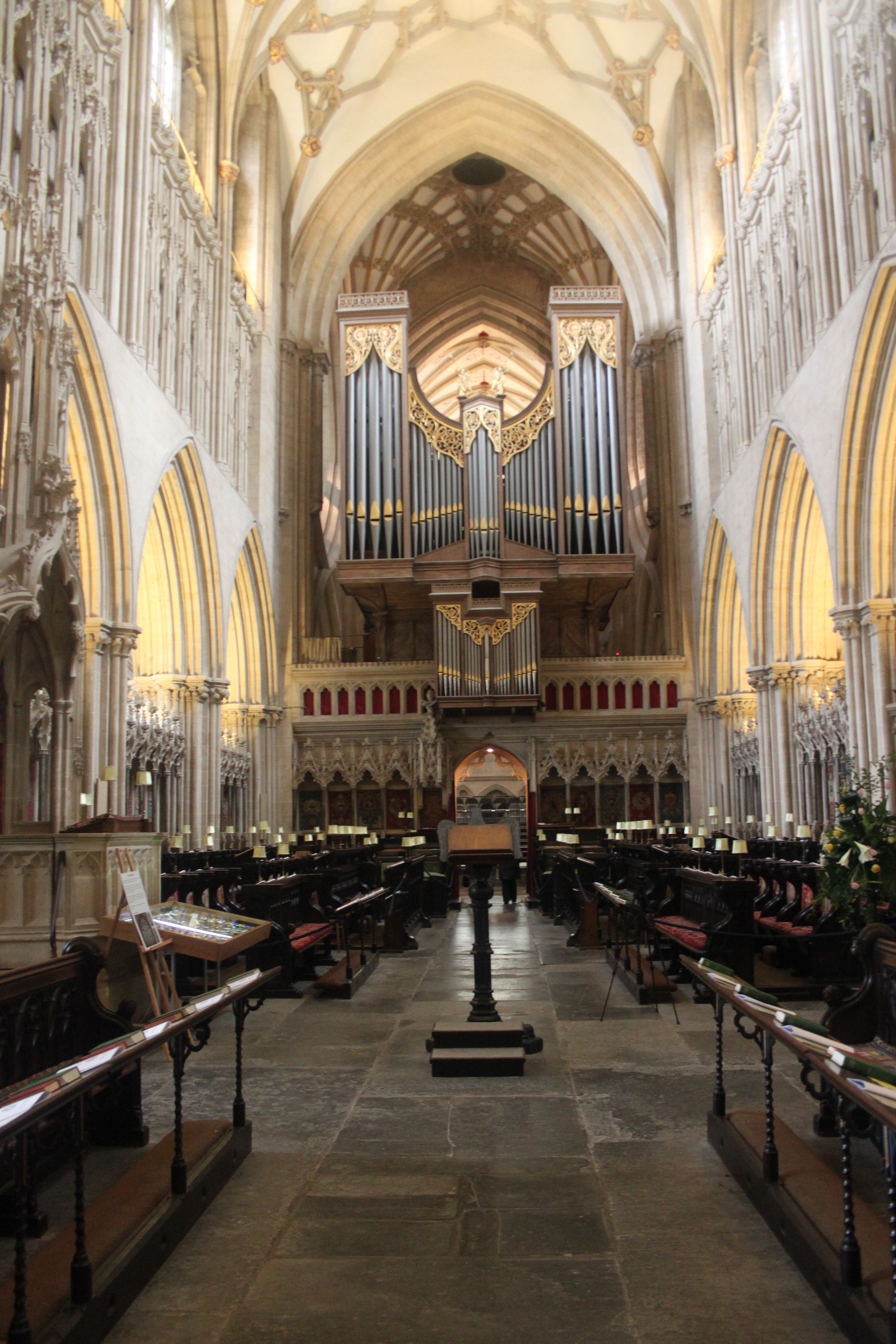
The choir and organ in 2013

The first record of an organ at this church dates from 1310. A smaller organ, probably for the Lady Chapel, was installed in 1415. In 1620 an organ built by Thomas Dallam was installed at a cost of £398 1s 5d.

The 1620 organ was destroyed by parliamentary soldiers in 1643. An organ built in 1662 was enlarged in 1786 and again in 1855. In 1909–1910 an organ was built by Harrison & Harrison of Durham, with the best parts of the old organ retained. It has been serviced by the same company ever since.

Since November 1996 the cathedral has also had a portable chamber organ, by the Scottish makers, Lammermuir. It is used regularly to accompany performances of Tudor and baroque music.

The first recorded organist of Wells was Walter Bagele (or Vageler) in 1416. The post of organist or assistant organist has been held by more than 60 people since. The choral musician Peter Stanley Lyons was Master of Choristers at Wells Cathedral, and Director of Music at Wells Cathedral School, between 1954 and 1960. The choral educator James William Webb-Jones, whose daughter Bridget married Peter Stanley Lyons in the cathedral, was Headmaster of Wells Cathedral School between 1955 and 1960, and also worked as a sidesman at the cathedral and as a member of the Friends of Wells Cathedral and of its Confraternity of St. Andrew.

Malcolm Archer was the appointed Organist and Master of the Choristers from 1996 to 2004. Matthew Owens was the appointed organist from 2005 to 2019.

=== Cathedral choir ===
There has been a choir of boy choristers at Wells since 909. Currently there are 18 boy choristers and a similar number of girl choristers, aged from eight to fourteen. The Vicars Choral—church singers were originally referred to as "vicars choral"—was formed in the 12th century and the sung liturgy provided by a traditional cathedral choir of men and boys until the formation of an additional choir of girls in 1994. The boys and girls sing alternately with the Vicars Choral and are educated at Wells Cathedral School.

The Vicars Choral currently number twelve men, of whom three are choral scholars. Since 1348 the College of Vicars had its own accommodation on the cathedral grounds, with a bridge added in 1459 so that the singers (all male) would not be subjected to temptation by local women, forming Vicars' Close. The Vicars Choral generally perform with the choristers, except on Wednesdays, when they sing alone, allowing them to present a different repertoire, in particular plainsong.

In December 2010 Wells Cathedral Choir was rated by Gramophone magazine as "the highest ranking choir with children in the world". It continues to provide music for the liturgy at Sunday and weekday services. The choir has made many recordings and toured frequently, including performances in Beijing and Hong Kong in 2012. Its repertoire ranges from the choral music of the Renaissance to recently commissioned works.

In 2024 the houses in Vicars' Close—thought to be the most complete and continuously occupied medieval street in Europe and still regularly occupied by singers as "grace-and-favour" residences—were in a serious state of disrepair, and the cathedral set up a project to repair the Grade I listed houses.

=== Chamber Choir ===
The Wells Cathedral Chamber Choir is a mixed adult choir of 25 members, formed in 1986 to sing at the midnight service on Christmas Eve, and invited to sing at several other special services. It now sings for about 30 services a year, when the Cathedral Choir is in recess or on tour, and spends one week a year singing as the "choir in residence" at another cathedral. Although primarily liturgical, the choir's repertoire includes other forms of music, as well as performances at engagements such as weddings and funerals.

=== Wells Cathedral Oratorio Society ===
The cathedral is home to Wells Cathedral Oratorio Society (WCOS), founded in 1896. With around 160 voices, the society gives three concerts a year under the direction of Matthew Owens, Organist and Master of the Choristers at the cathedral. Concerts are normally in early November, December (an annual performance of Handel's Messiah) and late March. It performs with a number of specialist orchestras including: Music for Awhile, Chameleon Arts and La Folia.

== Bells ==
The bells at Wells Cathedral are the heaviest ring of ten bells in the world, the tenor bell (the 10th and largest), known as Harewell, weighing 56.25 long hundredweight (2,858 kg). They are hung for full-circle ringing in the English style of change ringing. These bells are now hung in the south-west tower, although some were originally hung in the central tower.

| Number | Name | Date | Maker | Mass | | |
| Number | Name | Date | Maker | long measure | lb | kg |
|---|---|---|---|---|---|---|
| 1st | | 1891 | Mears & Stainbank | 7 long cwt 3 qr 12 lb | 880 | 399 |
| 2nd | | 1891 | Mears & Stainbank | 9 long cwt 0 qr 2 lb | 1,010 | 458 |
| 3rd | | 1757 | Abel Rudhall | 10 long cwt 0 qr 0 lb | 1,120 | 508 |
| 4th | | 1757 | Abel Rudhall | 10 long cwt 3 qr 0 lb | 1,204 | 546 |
| 5th | | 1757 | Abel Rudhall | 12 long cwt 2 qr 0 lb | 1,400 | 635 |
| 6th | | 1964 | Mears & Stainbank | 15 long cwt 1 qr 14 lb | 1,722 | 781 |
| 7th | | 1757 | Abel Rudhall | 20 long cwt 0 qr 0 lb | 2,240 | 1,016 |
| 8th | | 1757 | Abel Rudhall | 23 long cwt 0 qr 0 lb | 2,576 | 1,168 |
| 9th | | 1877 | John Taylor & Co | 32 long cwt 0 qr 0 lb | 3,584 | 1,626 |
| 10th | Harewell | 1877 | John Taylor & Co | 56 long cwt 1 qr 14 lb | 6,314 | 2,864 |

== Library ==
The library above the eastern cloister was built between 1430 and 1508. Its collection is in three parts: early documents housed in the Muniment Room; the collection predating 1800 housed in the Chained Library; and the post-1800 collection housed in the Reading Room. The chapter's earlier collection was destroyed during the Reformation, so that the present library consists chiefly of early printed books, rather than medieval manuscripts. The earlier books in the Chained Library number 2,800 volumes and give an indication of the variety of interests of the members of the cathedral chapter from the Reformation until 1800. The focus of the collection is predominantly theology, but there are volumes on science, medicine, exploration, and languages. Books of particular interest include Pliny's Natural History printed in 1472, an Atlas of the World by Abraham Ortelius, printed in 1606, and a set of the works by Aristotle that once belonged to Erasmus. The Chained Library can be visited on pre-booked tours or viewed from the Reading Room, which is open to the public on weekdays throughout the year and presents a small exhibition of documents and books.

=== Original records ===
Three early registers of the Dean and Chapter edited by W. H. B. Bird for the Historical Manuscripts Commissioners – Liber Albus I (White Book; R I), Liber Albus II (R III) and Liber Ruber (Red Book; R II, section i) – were published in 1907. They contain with some repetition, a cartulary of possessions of the cathedral, with grants of land back to the 8th century, well before hereditary surnames developed in England, and acts of the Dean and Chapter and surveys of their estates, mostly in Somerset. The current archivist is Dr Anne Crawford, formerly of the Public Record Office and widow of the medieval historian Charles Ross.

== Precincts ==
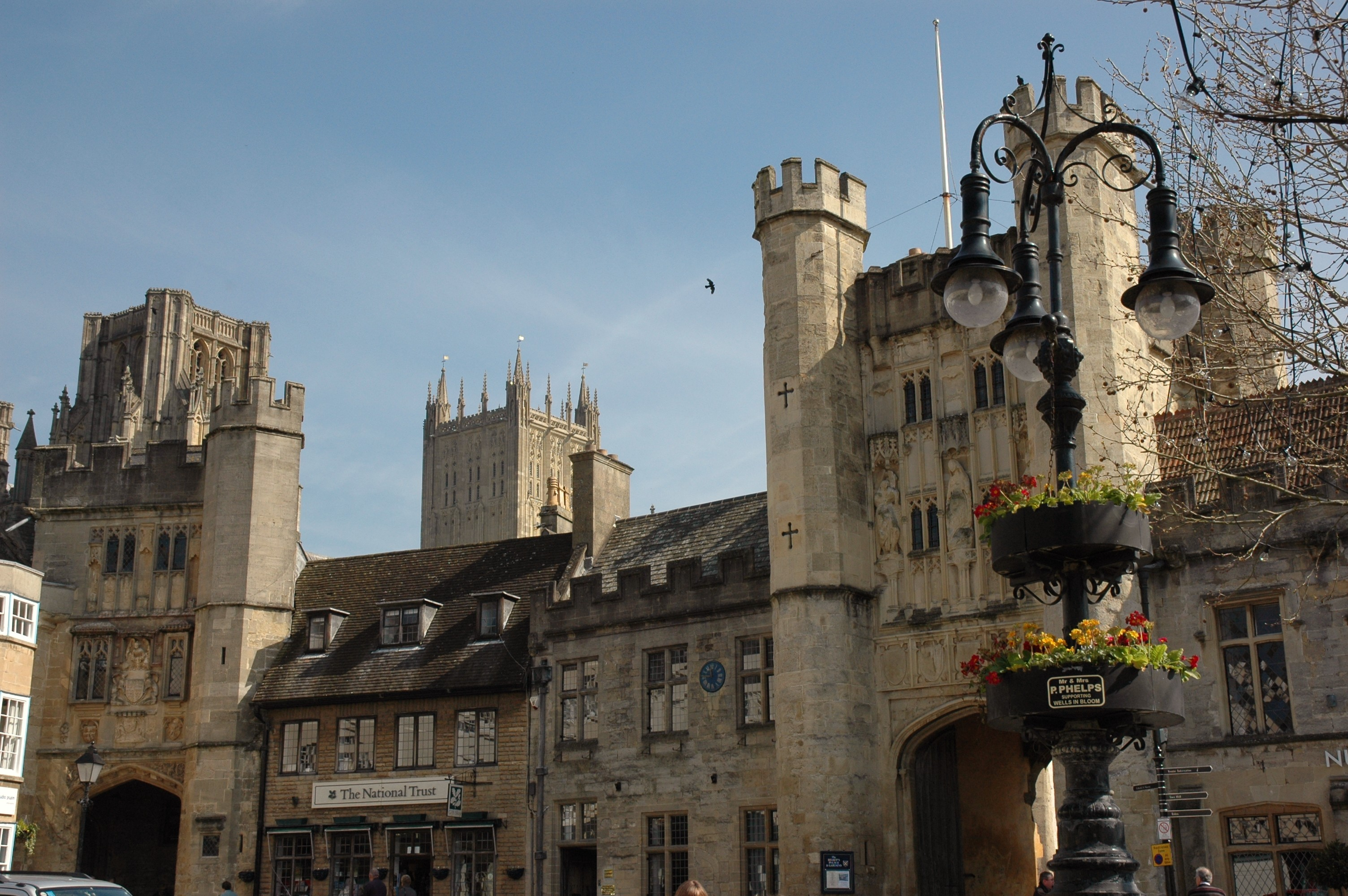
From the Market Place, Penniless Porch (left) leads to Cathedral Green, and The Bishop's Eye (right) to the Bishop's Palace.

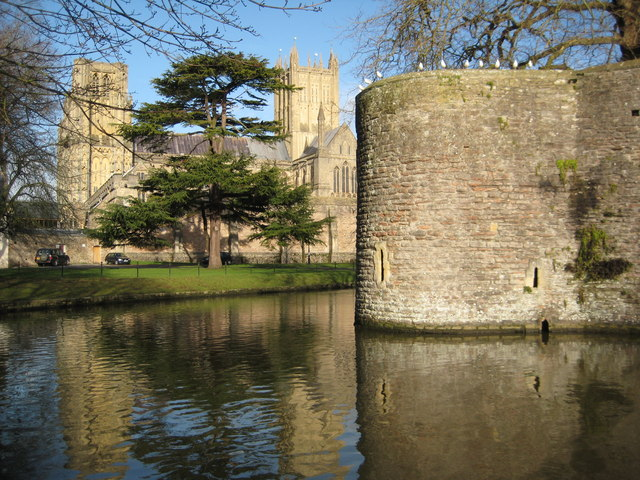
The cathedral seen beyond the wall and moat of the Bishop's Palace

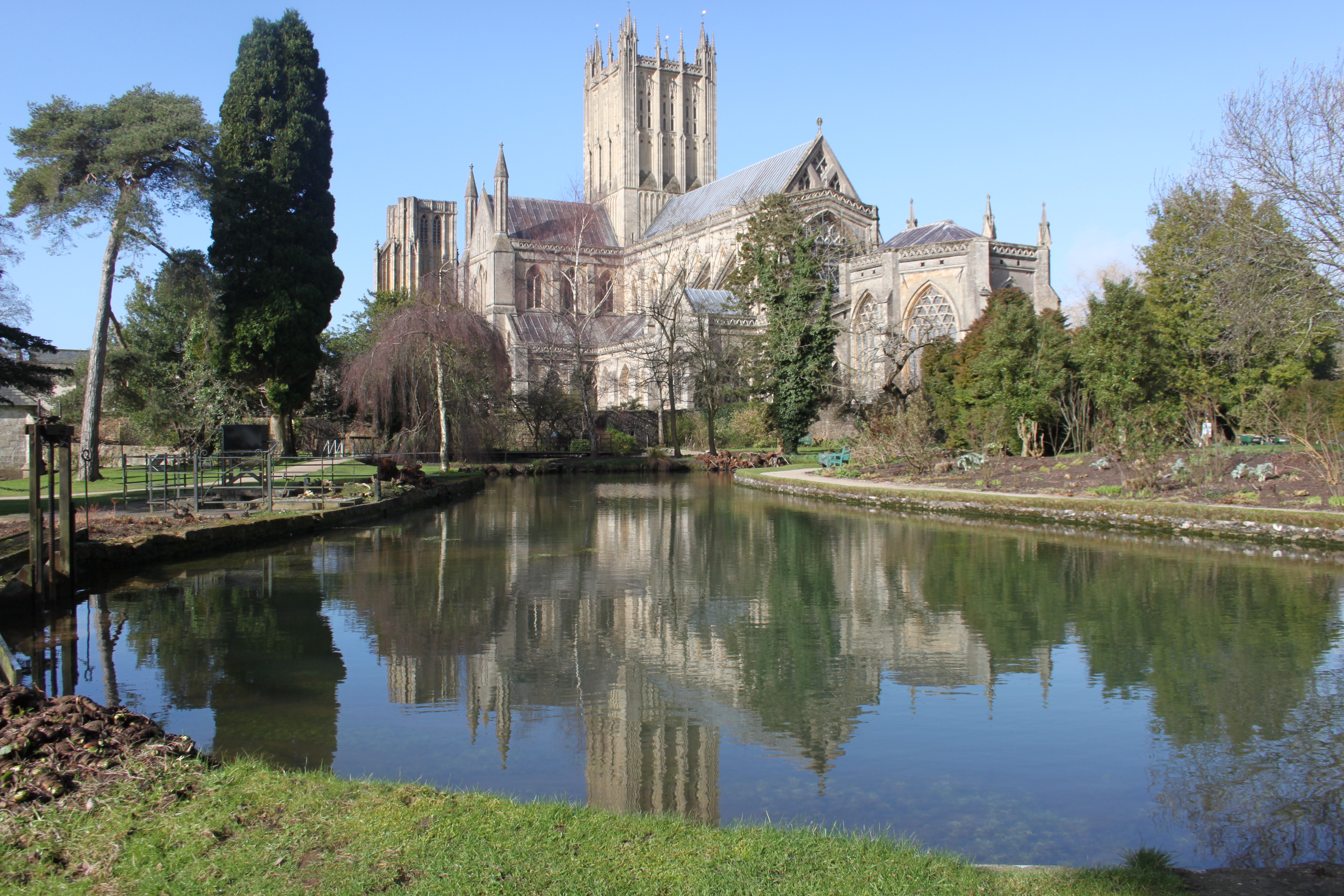
To the south and east of the cathedral is the Bishop's Garden and reflecting pool.

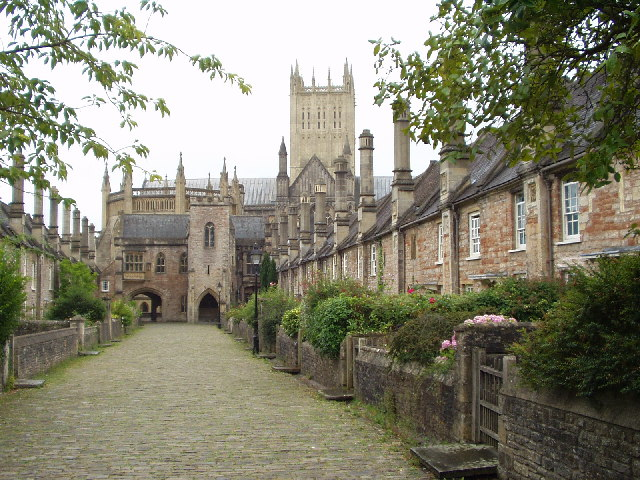
Vicars' Close extends to the north of the cathedral

Adjacent to the cathedral is a large lawned area, Cathedral Green, with three ancient gateways: Brown's Gatehouse, Penniless Porch and Chain Gate. On the green is the 12th-century Old Deanery, largely rebuilt in the late 15th century by Dean Gunthorpe and remodelled by Dean Bathurst in the late 17th century. No longer the dean's residence, it is used as diocesan offices.

To the south of the cathedral is the moated Bishop's Palace, begun about 1210 by Jocelin of Wells but dating mostly from the 1230s. In the 15th century Thomas Beckington added a north wing, now the bishop's residence. It was restored and extended by Benjamin Ferrey between 1846 and 1854.

To the north of the cathedral and connected to it by the Chain Gate is Vicars' Close, a street planned in the 14th century and claimed to be the oldest purely residential street in Europe, with all but one of its original buildings intact. Buildings in the close include the Vicars Hall and gateway at the south end, and the Vicars Chapel and Library at the north end.

The Liberty of St Andrew was the historic liberty and parish that encompassed the cathedral and surrounding lands closely associated with it.

== In the arts and popular culture ==
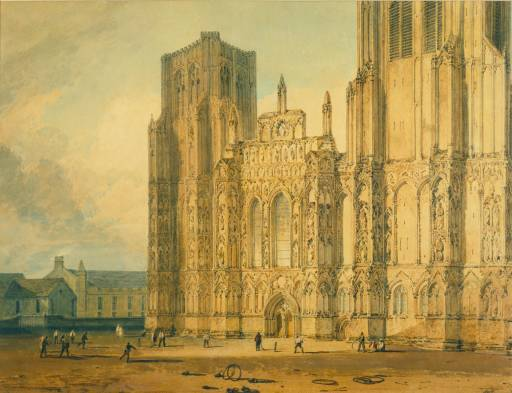
West front as painted by J. M. W. Turner around 1795, watercolour on paper

The English painter J. M. W. Turner visited Wells in 1795, making sketches of the precinct and a watercolour of the west front, now in the Tate gallery. Other artists whose paintings of the cathedral are in national collections are Albert Goodwin, John Syer and Ken Howard.

An account of the damage to the cathedral during the Monmouth Rebellion is included in Arthur Conan Doyle's 1889 historical novel Micah Clarke.

The cathedral served to inspire Ken Follett's 1989 novel The Pillars of the Earth and with a modified central tower, featured as the fictional Kingsbridge Cathedral at the end of the 2010 television adaptation of that novel. The interior of the cathedral was used for a 2007 Doctor Who episode, "The Lazarus Experiment", while the exterior shots were filmed at Southwark Cathedral.

The cathedral provided settings for scenes for the 2019–2020 television series The Spanish Princess. It was also used for filming the wedding of Henry VIII and Jane Seymour for Wolf Hall: The Mirror and the Light as Hampton Court's Palace Chapel. In a PBS newsletter, locations manager, Rebecca Pearson provided this comment: "Sky-high ceilings, vibrant stained glass, and intricate stone carvings give it the presence to host a key moment". In 2025 scenes for the Masters of the Universe film were filmed at the Cathedral.

Since 2012, the Cathedral has been the venue for Wells Art Contemporary, an annual juried exhibition of contemporary artwork.

== See also ==
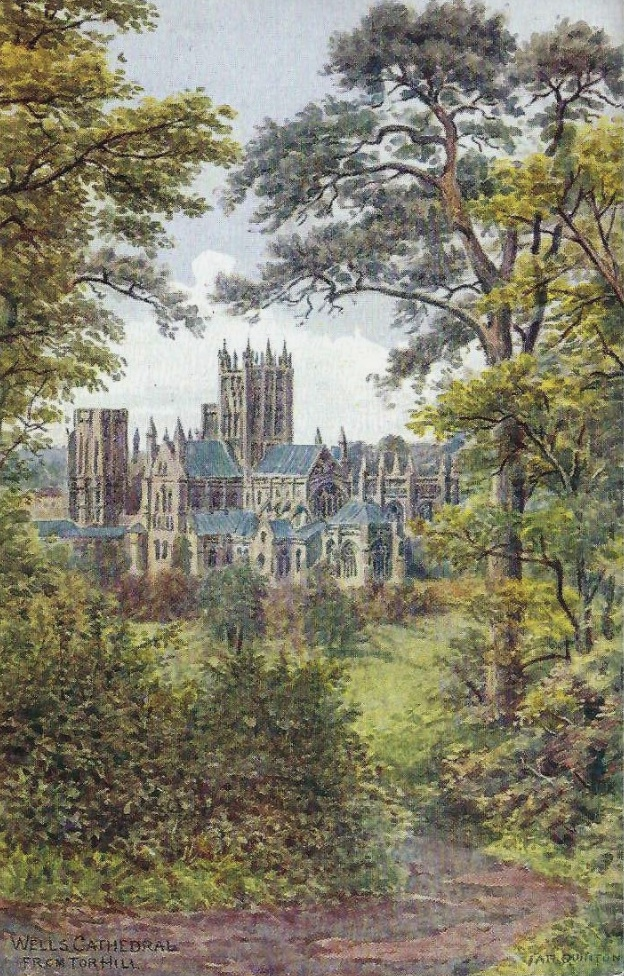
A. R. Quinton, Wells Cathedral from Tor Hill, c. 1920

- List of Gothic Cathedrals in Europe
- Early Gothic architecture
- English Gothic architecture
- Gothic cathedrals and churches
- English Gothic stained glass windows
- Late medieval domes
