= Trevor Nash =

Archdeacon of Basingstoke from 1982 to 1990 (1930-2016)

Trevor Gifford Nash (3 May 1930; 12 August 2016) was Archdeacon of Basingstoke from 1982 to 1990.

Nash was educated at Haileybury College; Clare College, Cambridge; Ripon College Cuddesdon. After curacies in Cheshunt and Kingston upon Thames he was Priest in charge at Stevenage. He was Vicar of Leagrave from Luton 1963 to 1967; Senior Chaplain at St George's Hospital from 1967 to 1973; and Rector of St Lawrence with St Swithun, Winchester from 1973 to 1982.

== Notes ==
Church of England titles
Preceded by Geoffrey Grenville Finch	Archdeacon of Basingstoke; 1982 – 1990	Succeeded by Alexander Francis Knight
