= Anthony Chute (priest) =

Anthony William Chute (b Basingstoke 17 December 1884 - d Basingstoke 2 April 1958) was Archdeacon of Basingstoke from 1948 until his death.

Turner was born at The Vyne and educated at Winchester; Magdalen College, Oxford; and Ripon College Cuddesdon. He was ordained in 1912. He was at the Winchester College Mission in Portsmouth until 1916 when he became a Chaplain to the Forces. In 1919 he became Vicar of St Oswald, West Hartlepool; and in 1925 Fellow and Dean of Divinity of his old Oxford college. He was Vicar of Highfield, Southampton from 1929 to 1936; and then Basingstoke until his death.

== Notes ==
Church of England titles
Preceded by John Carpenter Turner	Archdeacon of Basingstoke; 1948 – 1958	Succeeded by Richard Cuthbert Rudgard
