= St Faith's Church, Winchester =

Church in Hampshire, England

Coordinates: 51.0523°N 1.3211°W

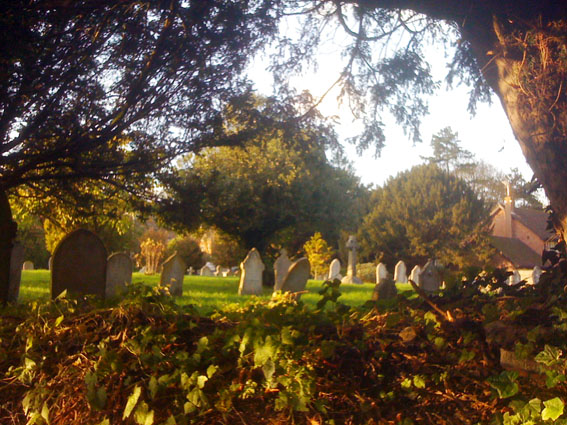
St Faith's churchyard, November 2011

St Faith's Church was the parish church of St Cross, a village just south of Winchester, Hampshire, England. It was situated on the northern side of what is now Kingsgate Road at its junction with what is now St Cross Road. The church's graveyard is still there today. The church was demolished in 1507, and St Cross Church, part of the Hospital of St Cross, became the parish church.

== History ==
The sign on the gate of St Faith's churchyard, November 2011

The earliest record of St Faith's Church is from the year 1172, but a pre-conquest cross-shaft discovered nearby suggests it was a place of worship from the 11th century or earlier.

In 1445, the Bishop of Winchester, Henry Beaufort, gave St Faith's Church to the nearby Hospital of St Cross and the Master of St Cross decided not to appoint a separate rector.

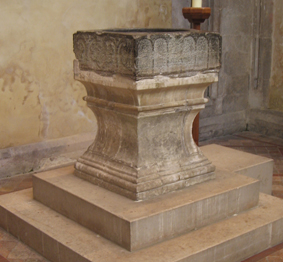
The font from St Faith's Church, now in St Cross Church, November 2011

By the late 15th century, St Faith's Church was in a poor state of repair due to the decline in the population. The parishioners could not afford to repair it and requested permission to worship at St Cross Church in the Hospital instead. The Master of St Cross agreed and in 1507 St Faith's was demolished, leaving just the graveyard, which continued to be used for burials and still belongs to St Cross. The font, bell and stone screens from St Faith's were moved to St Cross Church. St Cross had had no need of a font prior to this as it had not been a parish church. The stone screens are now on both sides of the sanctuary in St Cross Church.

== Fire ==
The local legend that St Faith's Church burned down is untrue.

== St Cross lectern ==
During the Commonwealth, a worker instructed to destroy the lectern at St Cross Church saved it by burying it in St Faith's graveyard instead. It was later dug up and returned to St Cross.
