= Geoffrey Finch =

Geoffrey Grenville Finch (7 October 1923; 31 March 1984) was Archdeacon of Basingstoke from 1971 until 1982.

Finch was educated at Quarry Bank High School, St Peter's College, Oxford, Wycliffe Hall, Oxford; and Wells Theological College. He was ordained in 1950. After a curacy in Wigan he held incumbencies in Westleigh, New Milton and Preston Candover.

== Notes ==
Church of England titles
Preceded by Richard Cuthbert Rudgard	Archdeacon of Basingstoke; 1971 – 1982	Succeeded by Trevor Gifford Nash
