= Michael Harley =

Archdeacon of Winchester

The Ven Michael Harley (Born Ivybridge, 4 September 1950) was Archdeacon of Winchester from 2009 until 2015.

Brand was educated at Queen Elizabeth's Grammar School, Crediton and King's College London. He was ordained deacon in 1975, and priest in 1976. After curacies in Walderslade and Weeke he held incumbencies at St Mary Extra, Southampton; Hurstbourne Tarrant and St Cross Winchester.

== Notes ==
Church of England titles
Preceded by John Guille	Archdeacon of Winchester; 2009–2015	Succeeded by Richard Brand
