= John Turner (archdeacon of Basingstoke) =

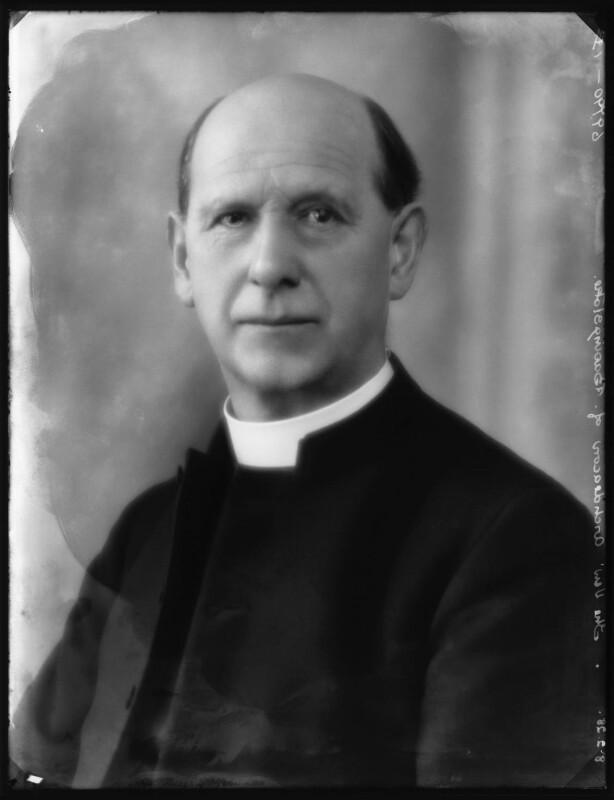
Turner in 1928

John Carpenter Turner (12 November 1867 – 9 February 1952) was Archdeacon of Basingstoke from 1927 until 1947.

Turner was educated at Cavendish College, Cambridge; and ordained Deacon in 1890, and Priest in 1891. After a curacy in Ryde he was Vicar of Whitchurch from 1899 to 1910; and Rector of Overton from 1910 to 1934.

In 1892 he married Elsie Maud Hewitt: they had three children, one of whom was killed during the First World War.

== Notes ==
Church of England titles
Preceded by Inaugural appointment	Archdeacon of Basingstoke; 1927 – 1947	Succeeded by Anthony Chute
