= Archdeacon of Winchester =

Church of England ecclesiastical office

The Archdeacon of Winchester is a senior ecclesiastical officer within the Diocese of Winchester.

== History ==
Originally created as the archdeaconry of Basingstoke on 26 July 1927 within the Diocese of Winchester and from the old Archdeaconry of Winchester, the office replaced that of Archdeacon of Surrey, which had been newly transferred to the Diocese of Guildford. The Basingstoke archdeaconry was renamed to Winchester in 2000, the ancient Archdeaconry of Winchester having been renamed to Bournemouth.

The archdeacon is responsible for the disciplinary supervision of the clergy within the archdeaconry, which (on its creation) consisted of six rural deaneries in the northern part of the diocese: Aldershot, Alton, Andover, Basingstoke, Kingsclere and Silchester. Since a pastoral reorganisation in 2000, the diocese now consists of the new archdeaconry of Winchester (the north) and the archdeaconry of Bournemouth (the south).

== List of archdeacons ==
Archdeacons of Basingstoke

- 1927–1947 (ret.): John Turner
- 1948–2 April 1958 (d.): Anthony Chute
- 1958–1971 (ret.): Richard Rudgard (afterwards archdeacon emeritus)
- 1971–1982 (res.): Geoffrey Finch (afterwards archdeacon emeritus)
- 1982–1990 (ret.): Trevor Nash (afterwards archdeacon emeritus)
- 1990–1998 (res.): Alec Knight
- 1999–2000: John Guille (became Archdeacon of Winchester)

In 2000, the archdeaconry was renamed Winchester.
Archdeacons of Winchester

- 2000–2007 (res.): John Guille (previously Archdeacon of Basingstoke)
- 23 April 2009 – 30 November 2015 (ret.): Michael Harley
- 2016–2026: Richard Brand (also Archdeacon of Bournemouth, in plurality, from 2021 to 2023)
- 2026– : Simon Butler
