= Richard Brand =

Archdeacon of Winchester

The Ven Richard Harold Guthrie Brand (born Oxted, 20 February 1965) was Archdeacon of Winchester from 2016 until May 2026.

Brand was educated at Sherborne, Durham University and Ripon College Cuddesdon. He was ordained deacon in 1989, and priest in 1990. After curacies in King's Lynn and Croydon he was Companion Team Priest at St Barnabas, Christchurch, New Zealand from 1996 to 1998. He was then Priest in charge of St Peter and St Paul, Hambledon, Hampshire then Team Rector of Harborough until his appointment as Archdeacon. He resigned in 2026 to pursue a career in corporate coaching.

== Notes ==
Church of England titles
Preceded by Michael Harley	Archdeacon of Winchester; 2016–2026	Succeeded by Simon Butler
