= Hospital of St Cross =

Grade I listed almshouse in Winchester, Hampshire, United Kingdom

Coordinates: 51°02′53″N 1°19′19″W

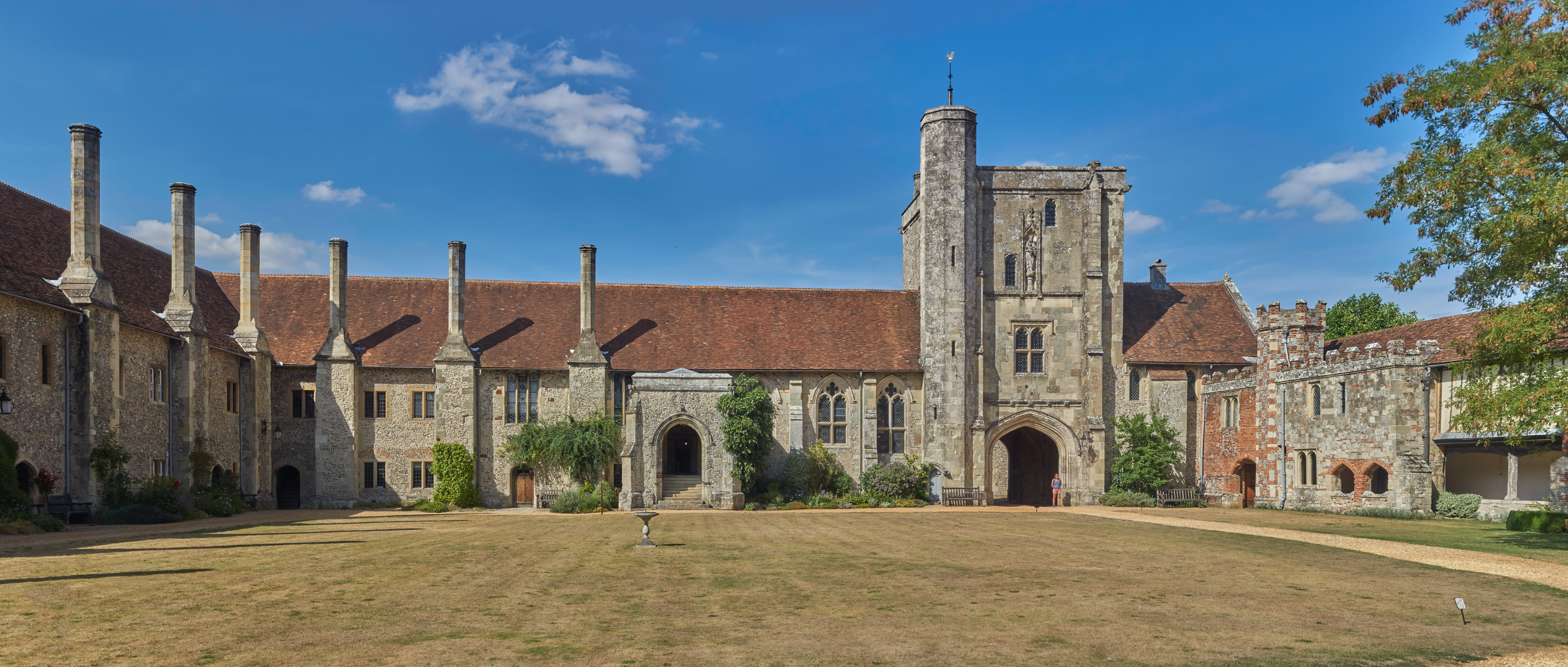
- The Hospital of St Cross
- Founded: c. 1132–36
- Founder: Henry of Blois
- Legal status: Charity
- Purpose: Almshouse
- Location: Winchester, England
- Master: The Reverend Dominik Chmielewski
- Website: hospitalofstcross.co.uk

Listed Building – Grade I
- Designated: 24 March 1950
- Reference no.: 1095374

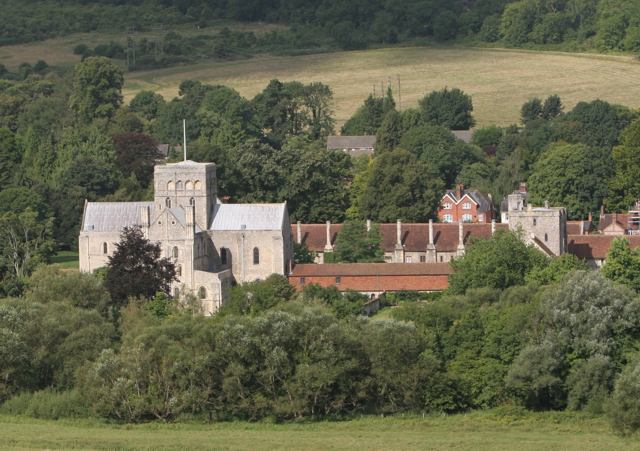
The hospital and church seen from St Catherine's Hill

The Hospital of St Cross and Almshouse of Noble Poverty is a medieval almshouse in Winchester, Hampshire, England. It has been described as "England's oldest and most perfect almshouse". Most of the buildings and grounds are open to the public at certain times. It is a Grade I listed building.

== History ==
It was founded by Henry of Blois, Bishop of Winchester, grandson of William the Conqueror and younger brother to King Stephen in 1136.

== Architecture ==
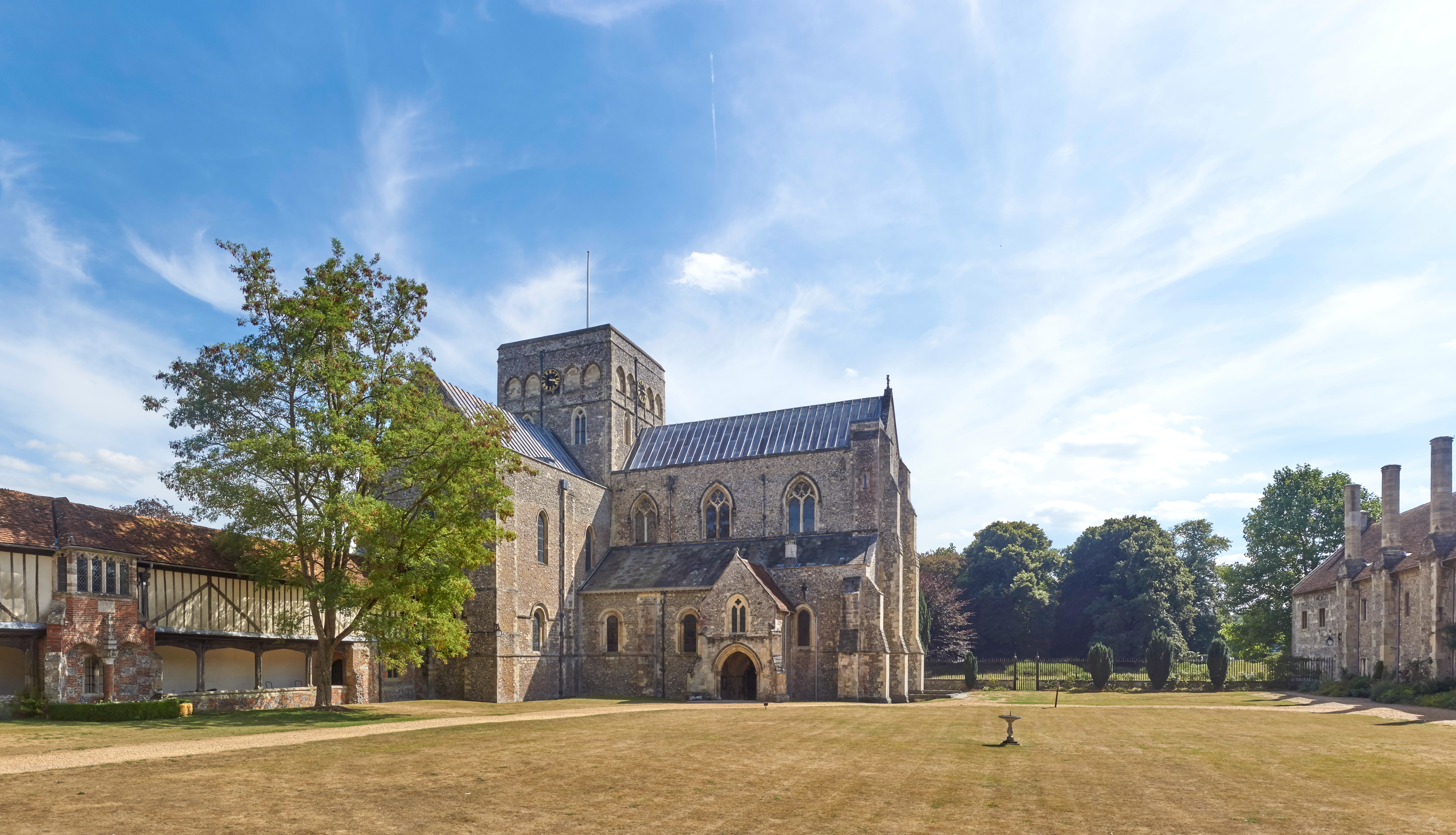
The church from the inner quadrangle

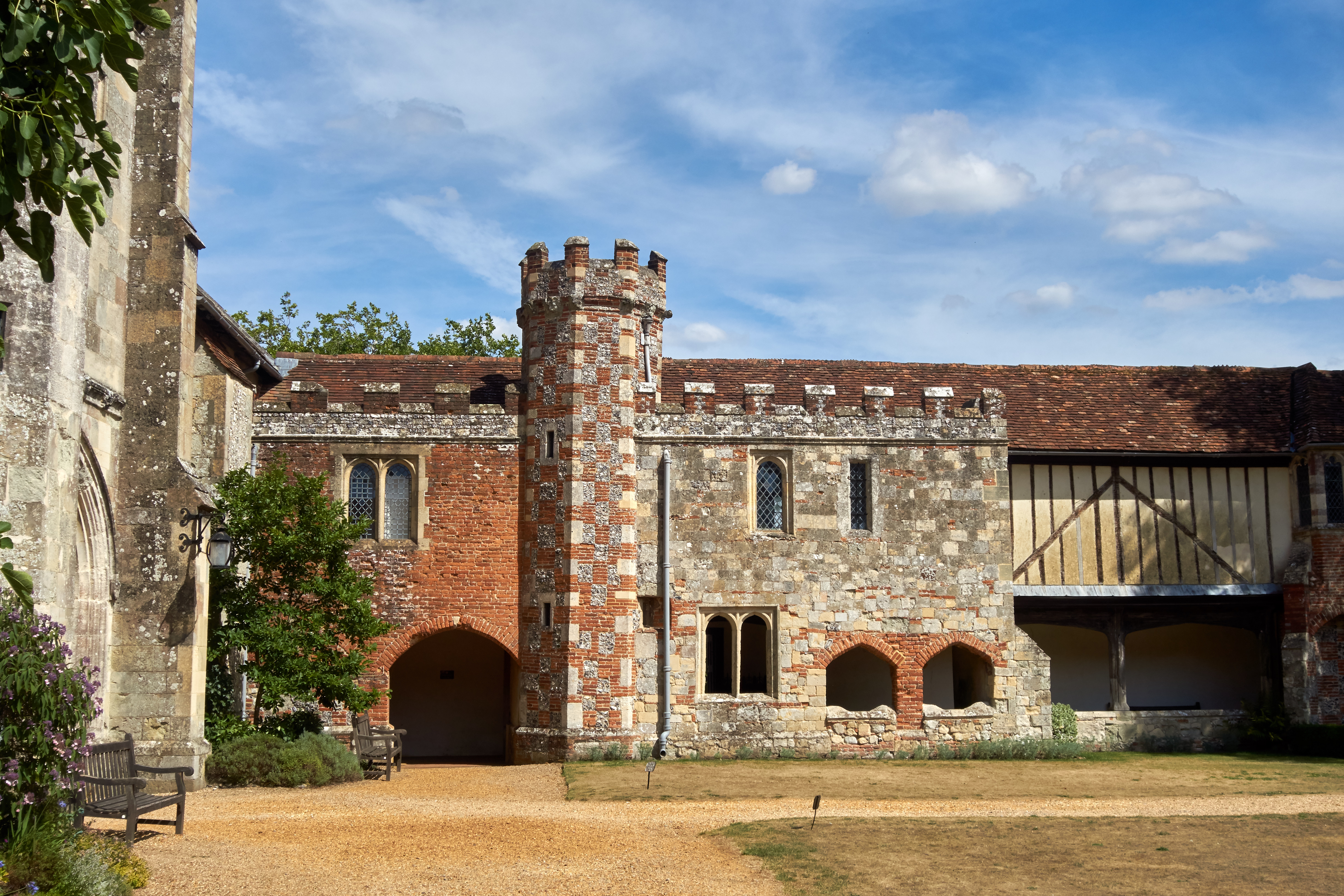
Ambulatory entrance

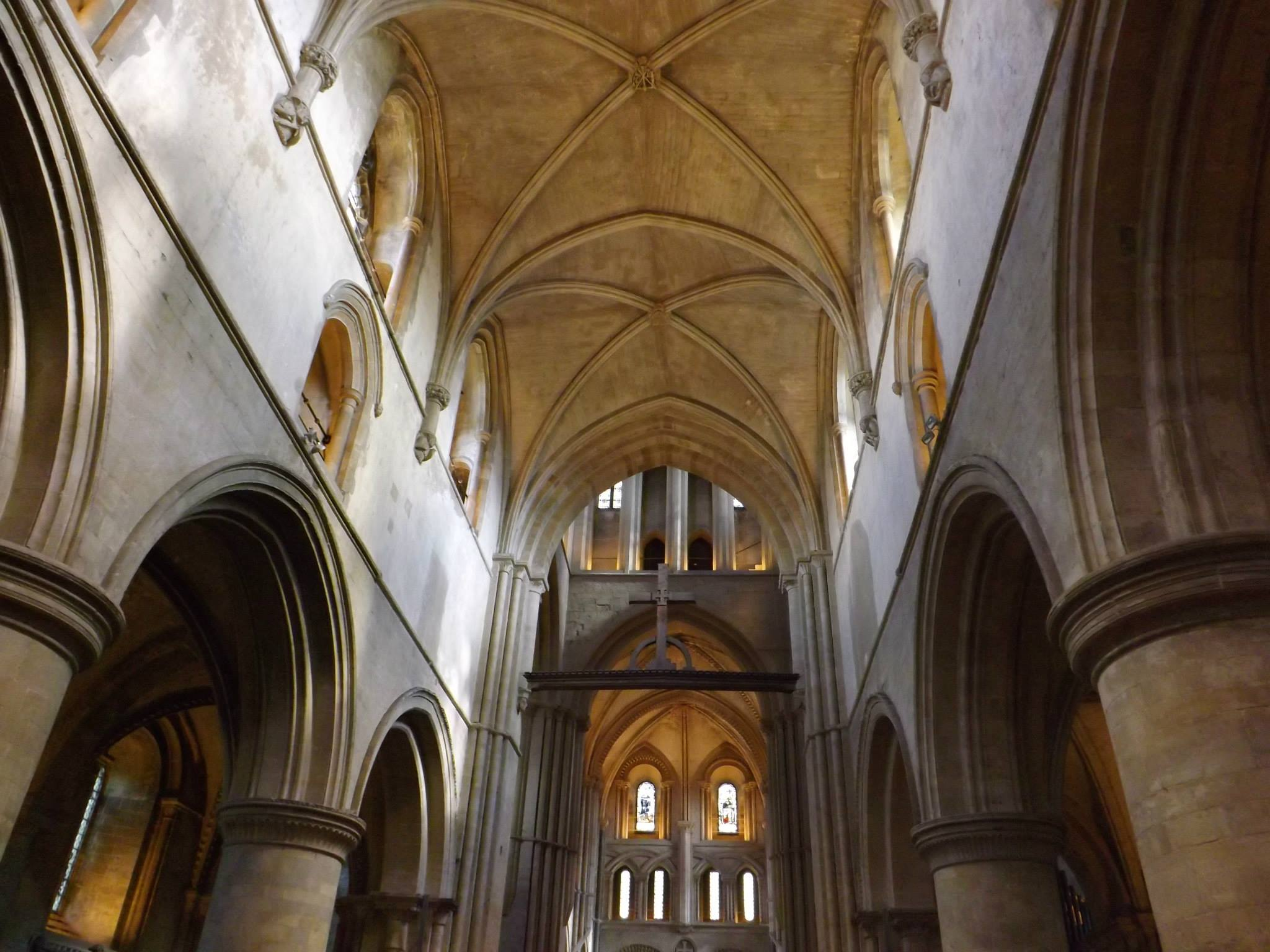
Inside the church at St Cross

The building is constructed of stone and surrounds two quadrangles. The smaller Outer Quadrangle to the north consists of: the outer gate (16th century); the brewhouse (14th century); from the 15th century, the guest wing, kitchen (which had to produce food for thirteen poor men and 100 men at the gates); the porter's lodge and the three-storey Beaufort Tower of c. 1450. This has three niches above the arch, one of which still contains the weathered statue of Cardinal Beaufort, who was Bishop of Winchester, and the tower and spaces above the porter's lodge used to be the Master's lodging.

Passing beneath the tower, the Inner Quadrangle is reached. The north range includes the 14th-century Brethren's Hall (which had to be large enough for the Brethren and 100 poor men), entered via a flight of steps in a stone porch. There is a timber screen with gallery above, within which is also a splendid timber roof, arch braced; a central hearth and a dais where the Master dined with the Brethren in the main part of the hall; and a wooden staircase leading to the Master's rooms in the south-east corner. The main set of two-storeyed lodgings are on the north-west and west sides of the quadrangle; these house the 25 inmates and are notable for the tall, regularly spaced chimneys and doorways, each leading to four sets of apartments. There used to be a corresponding range on the south side joined to the church, but this was demolished in 1789. The eastern or infirmary range is occupied by an ambulatory.

The 12th-century and 13th-century church in the south-east corner is more like a miniature cathedral than a typical almshouse chapel. The building is stone-vaulted throughout, with transepts and a central tower. The walls are over a metre thick, made from stone from Caen, Dorset, and the Isle of Wight as well as local flint. The roof is lead. The building is in Transitional Norman/Gothic style. Started in 1135, the chancel was the first part, built two bays deep with aisles. This is typically Norman, with round-headed windows and much chevron ornament. But the main arches in the arcade and beneath the central tower are slightly pointed in the Gothic manner. The three-bay aisled nave and transepts continue the style. Between 1383 and 1385, a large tracery window was inserted in the west front, and the clerestory windows in the nave were enlarged and a north porch added. Several medieval encaustic tiles survive on the floor. There are also traces of medieval wall paintings. The stained glass is mainly 19th century. The font came from the nearby St Faith's Church, which was demolished in 1507.

== Charitable work ==
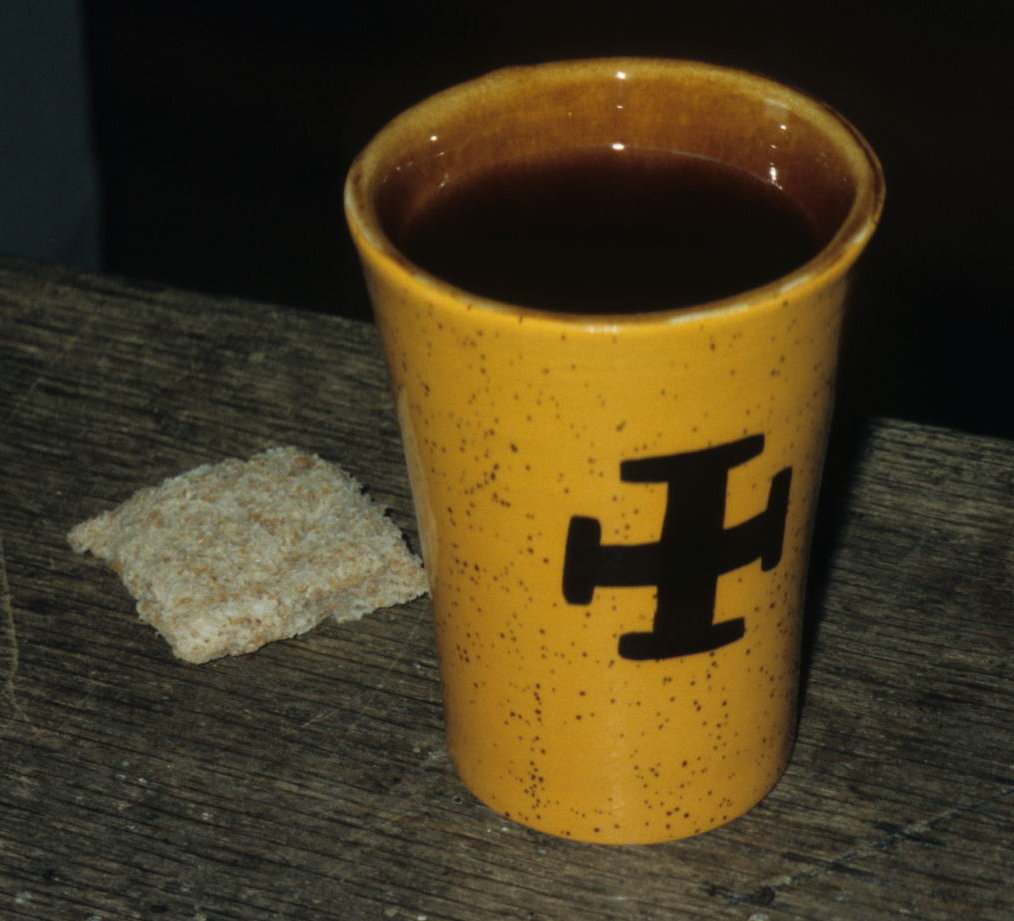
The Wayfarer's Dole in 2004

The Hospital still provides accommodation for a total of 25 elderly men, known as "The Brothers", under the care of "The Master". They belong to either of two charitable foundations: those belonging to the Order of the Hospital of St Cross (founded around 1132) wear black trencher hats and black robes with a silver badge in the shape of a cross potent, while those belonging to the Order of Noble Poverty (founded in 1445) wear claret trencher hats and claret robes with a silver cardinal's badge in memory of Cardinal Beaufort. They are often referred to as the "Black Brothers" and the "Red Brothers". Brothers must be single, widowed or divorced, and over 60 years of age. Preference is given to those in most need. They are expected to wear their robes and attend daily morning prayers (Matins) in the Chapel.

The Hospital continues an ancient tradition in the "Wayfarer's Dole", which consists of a small horn cup of ale and a piece of bread. The dole was started by a Cluniac monk and can be obtained by anyone who asks at the Porter's Lodge.

== Media ==
The hospital was used in the filming of The Day of the Triffids, and in the BBC adaptation of Wolf Hall. It was also featured on Songs of Praise.

== Masters of the Hospital ==
List of Priests - Masters of the Hospital of St Cross:

- Robert of Limesia (c.1132–c.1171)
- William (c.1171–c.1185)
- Robert (1185–1204)
- Alan de Stoke (1204–1234)
- Humphrey de Myles/Millers (c.1235–1241)
- Henry de Secusia (1241–1248)
- Geoffrey de Ferringhes (1248–c.1260)
- Thomas of Colchester (c.1260–c.1268)
- Stephen de Wotton (c.1268–1289)
- Peter de Sancta Maria (1289–1295)
- William de Wedlyng (1296–1299)
- Robert of Maidstone (c. 1300–1321)
- Geoffrey de Welleford (1321–1322)
- Bernard de Asserio/Assier (1322–1332)
- Peter de Galiciano (1332–1335)
- William of Edington (1335–1345)
- Raymund de Pelegrini (1345–1346)
- Walter de Wetgang (1346–1346)
- Richard de Lutteshall (1346–1346)
- John of Edington (1346–1348)
- William de Frlee (1348–1349)
- John of Edington (re-collated 1349–1366)
- William de Stowell (1366–1368)
- Richard de Lyntesford (1368–1370)
- Roger de Cloune (1370–1374)
- Nicholas of Wykeham (1374–1383)
- John Campden (1383–1410)
- John Forest (1410–1425)
- Thomas Forest (1425–1463)
- Thomas Chandlers S.T.P. (1463–1465)
- William Westbury S.T.B. (1465–1473)
- Richard Harward LL.D. (1473–1489)
- John Lychefield LL.D. (1489–1492)
- Robert Sherborne (1492–1508)
- John Claymund (1508–1524)
- John Innocent LL.D. (1524–1545)
- William Meadow M.A. (1545–1557)
- John Leffe LL.D. (1557–1557)
- Robert Reynolds LL.D. (1557–1559)
- John Watson M.D. (1559–1583)
- Robert Bennett S.T.P. (1583–1603)
- Arthur Lake S.T.B. (1603–1616)
- Sir Peter Young Kt. (1616–1627)
- William Lewis S.T.P. (1627–1649)
- John Lisle Esq. (1649–1657)
- John Cooke Esq. (1657–1660)
- Richard Shute Esq. (1660–1660)
- William Lewis S.T.P. (re-instated 1660–1667)
- Henry Compton D.D. (1667–1675)
- William Harrison D.D. (1675–1694)
- Abraham Markland D.D. (1694–1728)
- John Lynch D.D. (1728–1760)
- John Hoadly LL.D. (1760–1776)
- Beilby Porteus D.D. (1776–1788)
- John Lockman D.D. (1788–1807)
- Francis North, 6th Earl of Guilford M.A. (1808–1829)
- Lewis Humbert M.A. (1855–1867)
- William Andrews M.A. (1868–1900)
- Hon. Alan Broderick M.A. (1901–1909)
- Francis Causton M.A. (1909–1928)
- Alfred Daldy M.A. (1928–1936)
- Charles Bostock M.A. (1936–1943)
- Oswald Hunt M.A. (1943–1952)
- Geoffrey Carlisle M.A. (1953–1970)
- Kenneth Felstead M.Sc. (1970–1979)
- Colin Deedes M.A. (1980–1992)
- Anthony Outhwaite B.Sc. (1993–2005)
- James Bates (2005–2009)
- Michael Harley M. Phil. (2009–2011)
- Reginald Sweet B.A. (2011–2020)
- Terry Hemming M.A. (2020–2022)
- Dominik Chmielewski M.A. (2022–Present)
