= Richard Rudgard =

Richard Cuthbert Rudgard, OBE (28 December 1901 – 19 April 1985) was Archdeacon of Basingstoke from 1958 until his retirement in 1971.

The son of Canon Richard Wiliam Rudgard, he was educated at Radley and St Augustine's College, Canterbury. He was ordained in 1934 after several years with the Melanesian Mission. He was curate at Heene from 1934 to 1936 when he became Rector of Newbold Pacey with Moreton Morrell. When World War II began he became a Chaplain to the Forces, during which he was Mentioned in despatches thrice. In 1946 he became Rector of Eversley and was Rural Dean of Odiham from 1953 to 1958. He was the Incumbent at Ellisfield from 1960 to 1974.

== Notes ==
Church of England titles
Preceded by Anthony William Chute	Archdeacon of Basingstoke; 1958 – 1971	Succeeded by Geoffrey Grenville Finch
