= Alec Knight =

English Anglican clergyman (1939–2023)

Alexander Francis Knight, OBE (24 July 1939 – 21 November 2023) was an English Anglican clergyman who was the Dean of Lincoln from 1998 to 2006.

== Biography ==
Alexander Francis Knight was born into an ecclesiastical family on 24 July 1939. He was educated at Taunton School and St Catharine's College, Cambridge. Ordained in 1954, after a spell as a curate at Hemel Hempstead he became chaplain at his old school and then director of the Bloxham Project, an inter-school council to address the role of religion in schools. From here he became Director of Studies at the Aston Training Scheme, then priest in charge of Easton and Martyr Worthy in Hampshire. Finally (before his elevation to the deanery), he became Archdeacon of Basingstoke and a canon residentiary at Winchester Cathedral.

Knight was appointed OBE in 2006. He died on 21 November 2023, at the age of 84.

== Notes ==
Church of England titles
Preceded by Brandon Donald Jackson	Dean of Lincoln; 1998–2006	Succeeded by Philip John Warr Buckler
