= Chain Gate, Wells =

Gateway in Wells, Somerset, England

Chain Gate
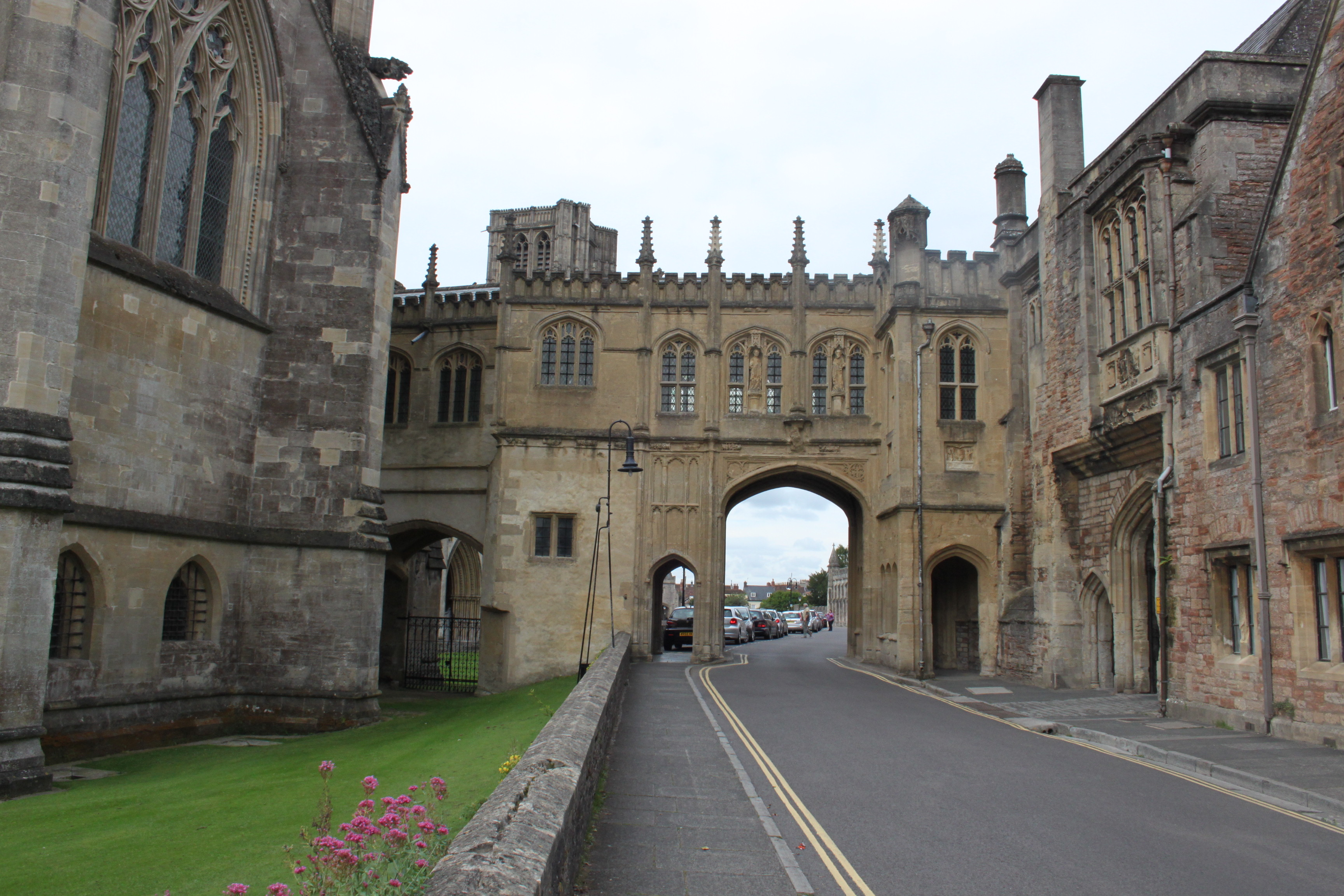

- Location within Somerset

General information
- Location: Wells, Somerset
- Coordinates: 51.210829°N 2.64333°W
- Completed: c1460

The Chain Gate in Wells, Somerset, England, is an entrance gateway adjacent to the north side of Wells Cathedral, controlling access from St Andrew Street to the Cathedral Green within the Liberty of St Andrew. It is a Grade I listed building. It was built around 1460 to link the cathedral to Vicars' Close.

== History ==
The Chain Gate was built around 1460 for Bishop Thomas Beckington, to provide easy access to and from the cathedral and Vicars' Close which had been built for the Vicars Choral. The Chain Gate enabled the vicars to enter the cathedral for services or meetings in the chapter house without entering the public realm or cope with inclement weather.

An undated sketch by Henry Edridge (1768–1821) shows the Chain Gate in the late 18th or early 19th century, with a much taller wall than exists today alongside the road approaching the gate.

== Architecture ==
The Chain Gate is a two-storey building of Doulting stone ashlar with a Welsh slate roof. The lower level comprises a wagon gate flanked on both sides by pedestrian gates. The upper level provides a passageway between the Chapter House of the cathedral and Vicars' Close. It is supported by three arches, one for carts (now cars) and two for pedestrians. There is a slight bend within the passageway as the entrance to the cathedral, via the approach staircase past the Chapter House, and that in Vicars Hall were not exactly opposite each other. It is topped by a battlemented parapet. In the walls are niches with statues of saints. It also shows the arms of Bishop Beckington on a shield.
