= Penniless Porch, Wells =

Gateway in Wells, Somerset, England

Penniless Porch
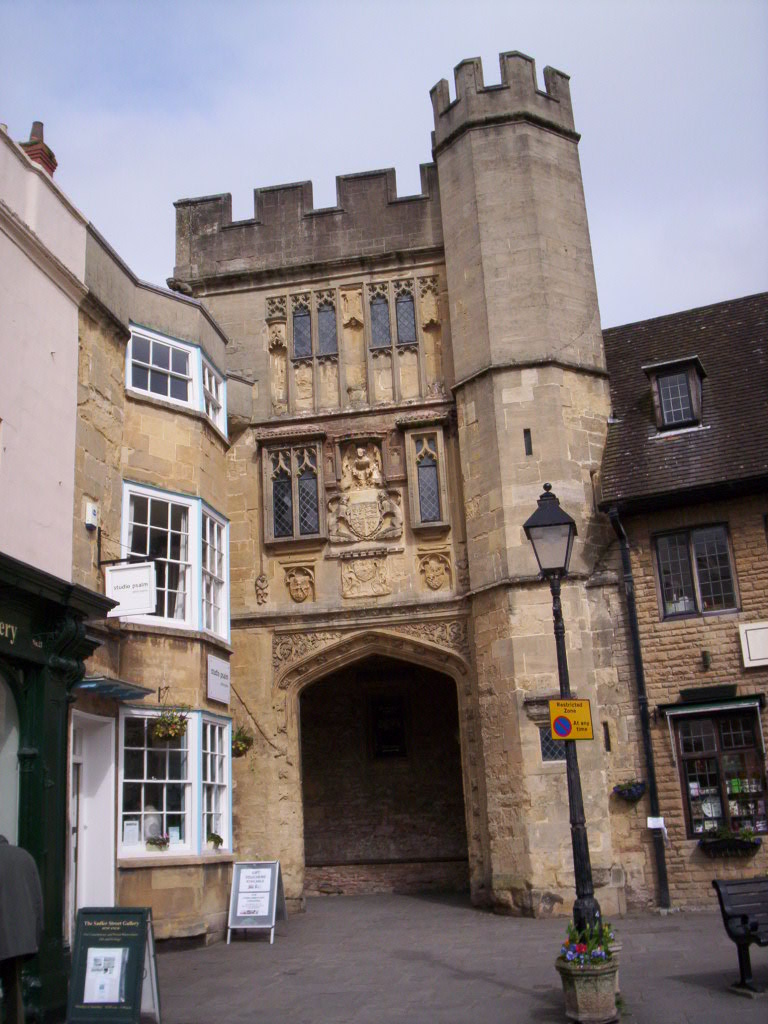

- Location within Somerset

General information
- Location: Wells, Somerset
- Coordinates: 51.20971°N 2.64472°W
- Construction started: c1450

The Penniless Porch in Wells, Somerset, England, is an entrance gateway into a walled precinct, the Liberty of St Andrew, which encloses the twelfth century Cathedral, the Bishop's Palace, Vicar's Close and the residences of the clergy who serve the cathedral. It has been designated as a Grade I listed building.

The Penniless Porch was built around 1450, by Bishop Thomas Beckington (also spelt Beckyngton) and bears his rebus or badge on the cathedral side. It forms one of a pair with The Bishop's Eye which formed the gateway into the Bishop's palace from the market place.

It is a three-storey building of Doulting ashlar stone. The roof is behind a battlemented parapet. It is connected to the adjacent buildings and the rooms above the archway are used by the company occupying No 16 Market Place. The first floor room has panelling from the 17th century.

The Penniless Porch was painted by Joseph Mallord William Turner in 1795.

It was named for the beggars who plied their trade there, however in 2016 a man was prosecuted for begging nearby.
