= The Bishop's Eye, Wells =

Gateway in Wells, Somerset, England

The Bishop's Eye
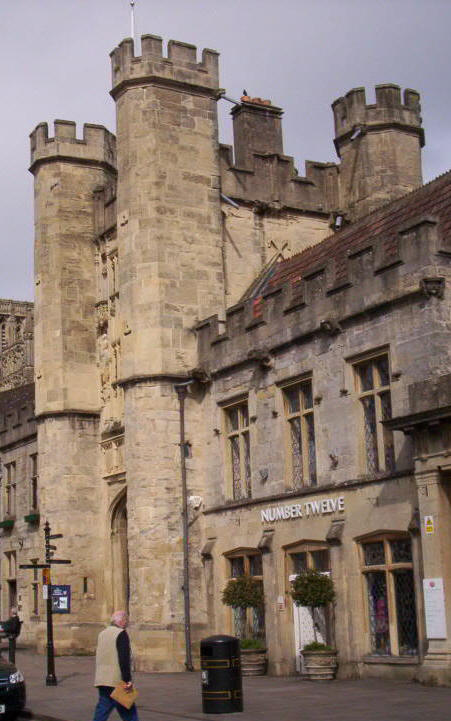

- Location within Somerset

General information
- Location: Wells, Somerset
- Coordinates: 51.2095°N 2.64467°W
- Construction started: c. 1450

The Bishop's Eye in Wells, Somerset, England, is an entrance gateway into a walled precinct, the Liberty of St Andrew, which encloses the twelfth century Cathedral, the Bishop's Palace, Vicar's Close and the residences of the clergy who serve the cathedral. It has been designated as a Grade I listed building.

The Bishop's Eye was built around 1450, by Bishop Thomas Beckington (also spelt Beckyngton), and provides the entrance to the Bishop's Palace. It forms one of a pair with the Penniless Porch which formed the gateway into the cathedral from the market place and is in a similar style.

It is a three-storey building of Doulting ashlar stone, with a copper roof. The timber gates were added in the 18th century. On the front of the structure facing into the market place are a statue niche and heraldic shields carved into the stonework.

It is frequently photographed and has appeared in films such as Hot Fuzz. It was drawn in 1785 by Joseph Mallord William Turner and painted in 1920 by Ernest Haslehust.
