= Wells St Andrew =

Former parish in Somerset, England

Coordinates: 51.2104°N 2.642°W

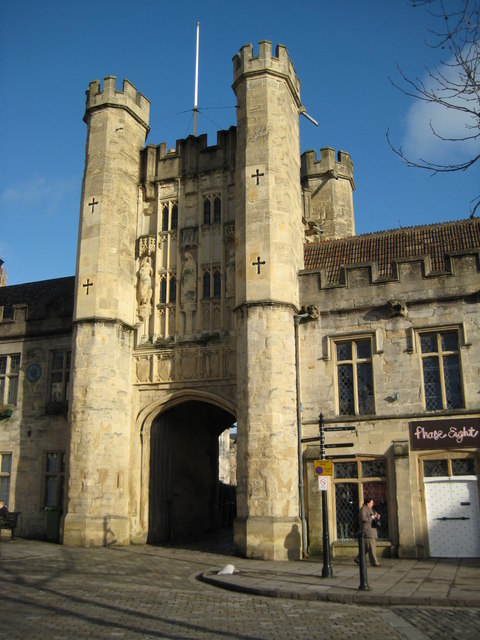
- The Bishop's Eye: the most prominent extant gateway, leading from the Market Place into the walled precinct of the Liberty and the Bishop's Palace; the walls and gates belonged to the Liberty.

- Location within Somerset
- Civil parish: Wells
- Unitary authority: Somerset
- Ceremonial county: Somerset
- Region: South West
- Country: England
- Sovereign state: United Kingdom
- Police: Avon and Somerset
- Fire: Devon and Somerset
- Ambulance: South Western

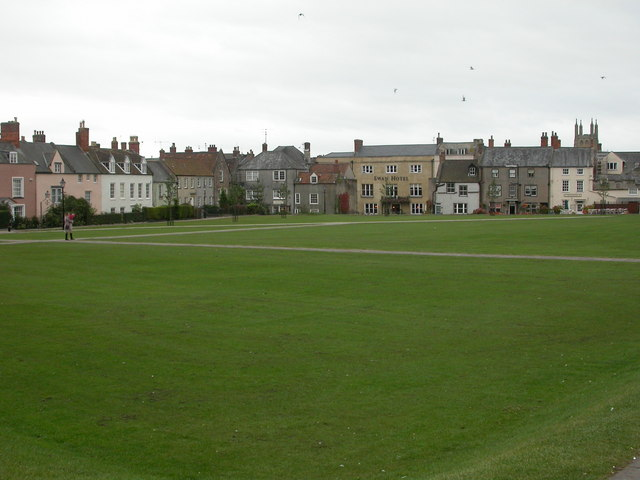
The Cathedral Green: the Swan Hotel is outside the Liberty but can be seen through a gap made in the perimeter otherwise formed by the buildings surrounding the Green.

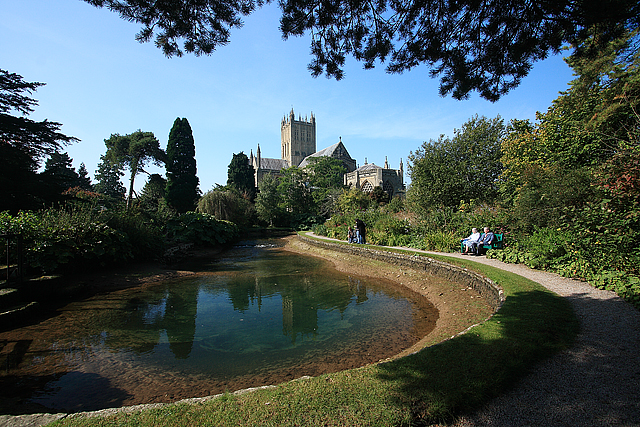
One of the wells, dedicated to St Andrew, which give the city its name, located in the gardens of the Bishop's Palace in the centre of the Liberty.

Wells St Andrew, or St Andrew Liberty, or derivations thereof, was a liberty, ecclesiastical parish, and later a civil parish, containing Wells Cathedral (which is dedicated to Saint Andrew) and surrounding land, now in the civil parish of Wells, in Somerset, England.

== History ==
Bishop Jocelin established the area as a liberty, so as to be free from civil jurisdiction, in 1207. The liberty was founded to provide housing for the canons of the cathedral, who were secular clergy.

The Liberty encompassed 52 acres (21 ha) broadly situated to the east of the city centre of Wells. The main part of the Liberty formed a walled precinct within the city (which was otherwise not walled) and this included Wells Cathedral, the Cathedral Green, the Bishop's Palace, the Old Deanery, and Vicars' Close.

The Bishop's Palace was already surrounded by walls, but in 1286 Bishop Burnell obtained a licence to crenellate, so as to build gated walls around the wider cathedral close and adjacent residential complex of canons; this licence was repeated in 1340 for Bishop Ralph of Shrewsbury. The building of the walls is believed to have filled a number of roles, including defending the ecclesiastical territory in a time of hostilities between religious and civic authorities, displaying the authority of the Bishop of Bath and Wells, and possibly also in part as an element in the landscaping of the cathedral close and palace.

Access to this walled area was controlled by a number of gatehouses and other gateways; many of these buildings still exist: the Bishop's Eye, Brown's Gatehouse, the Chain Gate, the Penniless Porch (all four constructed under Bishop Beckington, c. 1450-60) and the gateways at both ends of Vicars' Close. Much of the walls remain extant too, though in places have been reduced in height or have purposeful gaps. In places buildings formed the walled perimeter, especially facing the city centre; a notable gap in this built-up perimeter now exists opposite the Swan Hotel on Saddler Street, which allows for the hotel a direct view of the cathedral and a terrace by the Cathedral Green.

The Liberty included further surrounding land and property owned by and with close connections to the cathedral, its bishop, and its clergy. Parts of the Liberty not within its walled precinct consisted of much the present-day site of the Wells Cathedral School, as well as a small area of the city centre including the Town Hall, some surrounding buildings and down to the Bishop's Barn on Silver Street. The Town Hall was originally the site of one of the canon's houses.

The residents of the Liberty had specific rights in relation to seating in the cathedral and were exempt from contributing to the fees for upkeep of the city. The giving of alms to the poor attracted beggars into the Liberty which annoyed the residents in the 17th and 18th centuries. There were also conflicts over jurisdiction between the Dean and Chapter of the Cathedral and the city authorities.

=== 19th and 20th centuries ===
Its population was recorded by national censuses carried out from 1801 to 1931, and during this period was generally between 300 and 400 residents.

Wells St Andrew became a civil parish in 1866, on 1 April the parish was abolished and merged with Wells St Cuthbert In to form the present-day civil parish of Wells, which covers all of the city; local government for Wells in this period was provided largely by Wells Municipal Borough. In 1931 the parish had a population of 290.

== Present-day ==
The area of the former liberty retains a distinct character within the present-day city of Wells, and is still largely owned by the diocese, though with many areas open to the public (including the Bishop's Palace and gardens). Through the northern part are streets named The Liberty (historically "North Liberty") and East Liberty. Ordnance Survey 1:25,000 maps continue to label the area with "St Andrew".
