= Bishop's Palace, Wells =

Historic house museum in UK

Bishop's Palace
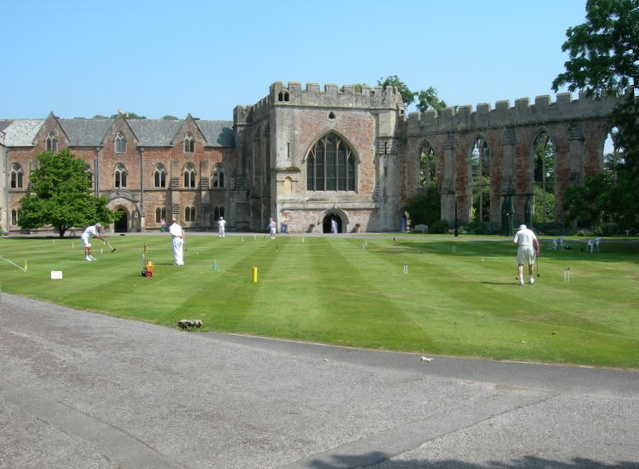
- Croquet on the lawn of The Bishop's Palace, in front of the chapel
- Interactive map of the Bishop's Palace area

General information
- Location: Wells, England
- Coordinates: 51°12′34″N 2°38′33″W
- Construction started: c. 1210
- Client: Jocelin of Wells

The Bishop's Palace is the residence of the bishop of Bath and Wells in Wells, Somerset, England. The palace is adjacent to Wells Cathedral and has been the residence of the bishops since the early thirteenth century. It has been designated a grade I listed building.

Building of the palace started around 1210 by bishops Jocelin of Wells and Reginald Fitz Jocelin, and the chapel and great hall were added by Bishop Robert Burnell between 1275 and 1292. The walls, gatehouse and moat were added in the 14th century by Bishop Ralph of Shrewsbury. The Bishop's House was added in the 15th century by Bishop Thomas Beckington. The great hall later fell into disrepair and was partially demolished around 1830.

The palace was originally surrounded by a medieval deer park. When the walls were built, streams were diverted to form the moat as a reservoir. In the 1820s, the grounds within the walls were planted and laid out as pleasure grounds by Bishop George Henry Law, who created a reflecting pond near the springs. Parts of the buildings are still used as a residence by the current bishop; however, much of the palace is now used for public functions and as a tourist attraction.

== History ==
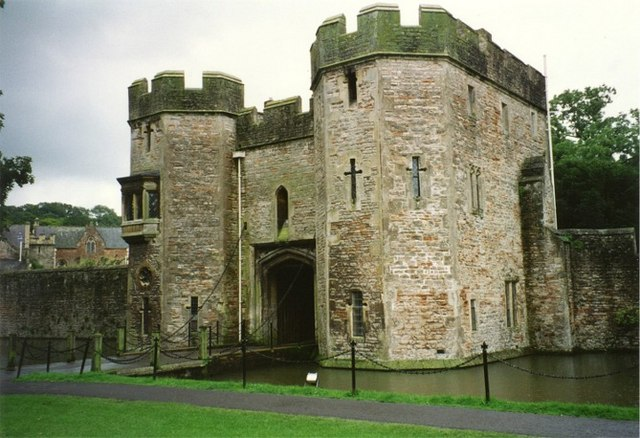
The Gatehouse

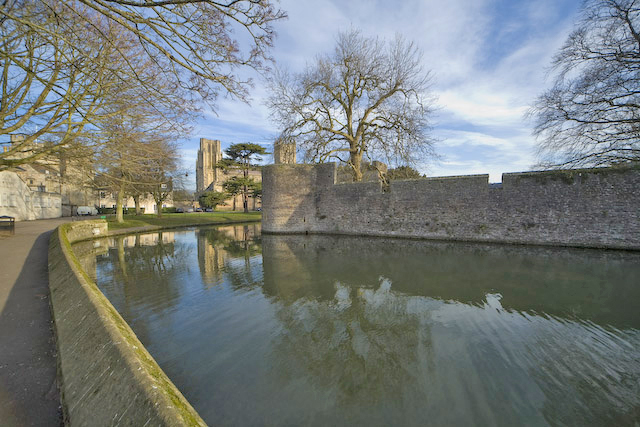
The moat

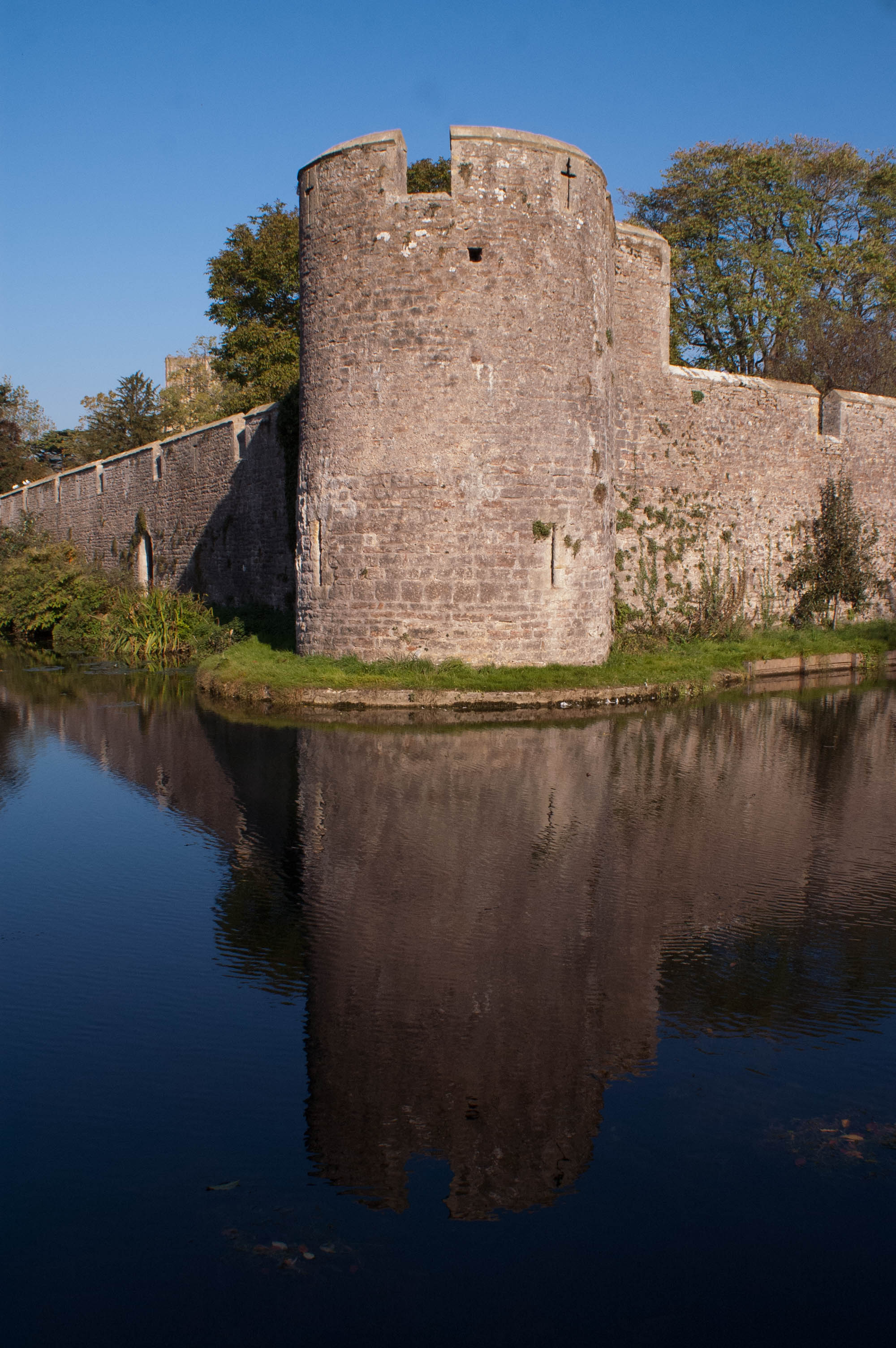
Boundary Wall

Construction began around 1210 by Bishop Jocelin of Wells but principally dates from 1230. Bishop Jocelin continued the cathedral building campaign begun by Bishop Reginald Fitz Jocelin, and was responsible for building the Bishop's Palace, as well as the choristers' school, a grammar school, a hospital (or perhaps hostel) for travellers and a chapel within the liberty of the cathedral. He also built a manor house at Wookey, near Wells. The chapel and great hall were built between 1275 and 1292 for Bishop Robert Burnell. The windows had stone tracery. Stone bosses where the supporting ribs meet on the ceiling are covered with representations of oak leaves and the Green Man. The building is seen as a fine example of the Early English architectural style.

In the 14th century, Bishop Ralph of Shrewsbury continued the building. He had an uneasy relationship with the citizens of Wells, partly because of his imposition of taxes, and surrounded his palace with 5 metres (16 ft) crenellated walls, a moat and a drawbridge. The three-storey gatehouse, which dates from 1341, has a bridge over the moat. The entrance was protected by a heavy gate, portcullis and drawbridge, operated by machinery above the entrance, and spouts through which defenders could pour scalding liquids onto any attacker. The drawbridge was still operational in 1831 when it was closed after word was received that the Palace of the Bishop of Bristol was subject to an arson attack during the Bristol riots. These took place after the House of Lords rejected the second Reform Bill. The proposal had aimed to get rid of some of the rotten boroughs and give Britain's fast-growing industrial towns such as Bristol, Manchester, Birmingham, Bradford and Leeds greater representation in the House of Commons; however, there was no rioting in Wells. The water which filled the moat flowed from the springs in the grounds which had previously chosen its own course as a small stream separating the cathedral and the palace and causing marshy ground around the site. The moat acted as a reservoir, controlled by sluice gates, which powered watermills in the town.

The north wing (now the Bishop's House) was added in the 15th century by Bishop Beckington, with further modifications in the 18th century, and in 1810 by Bishop Beadon. It was restored, divided, and the upper storey added by Benjamin Ferrey between 1846 and 1854. Following the Dissolution of the Monasteries in 1548, Bishop Barlow sold Edward Seymour, 1st Duke of Somerset the palace and grounds. These were recovered after the Duke's execution in 1552.

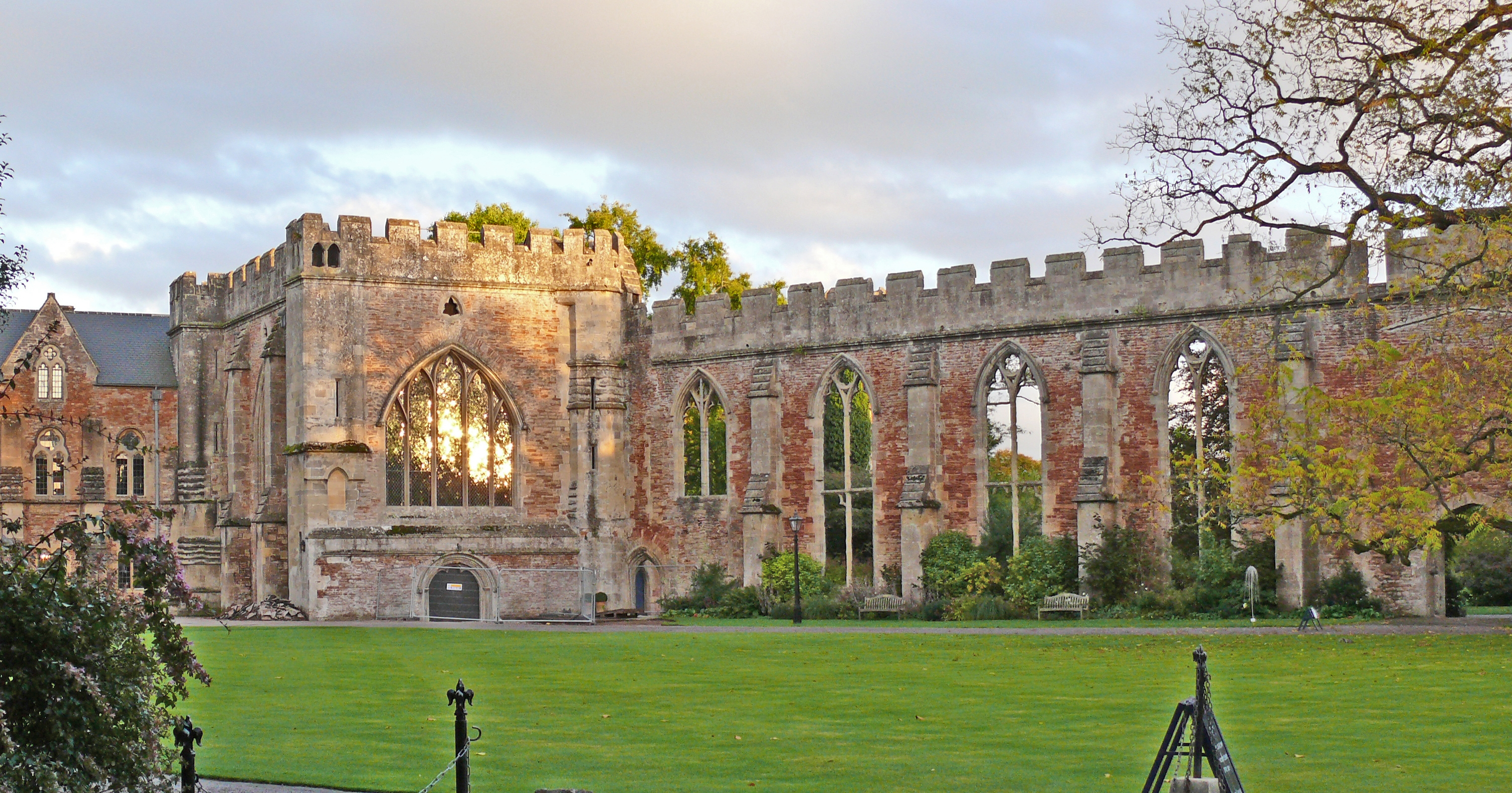
The Chapel and ruined Great Hall

In the 1550s, Bishop Barlow sold the lead from the roofs of the Great Hall. It can be seen in an engraving of 1733, but was largely demolished around 1830 by Bishop Law. He created a "more picturesque ruin" by removing the south and east walls and laying out and planting the area previously occupied by the great hall. The palace was used as a garrison for troops in both the English Civil War and Monmouth Rebellion after which it was used as a prison for rebels after the Battle of Sedgemoor.

Bishop Kidder was killed during the Great Storm of 1703, when two chimney stacks in the palace fell on him and his wife, while they were asleep in bed. A central porch was added around 1824 and, in the 1840s and 1850s, Benjamin Ferrey restored the palace and added an upper storey. He also restored the chapel using stained glass from ruined French churches.

In 1953, it was designated as a Grade I listed building. In February 2008, the poet laureate of the United Kingdom, Andrew Motion, was commissioned by the BBC West television programme Inside Out West to write a poem in Harry Patch's honour. Entitled "The Five Acts of Harry Patch" it was first read at a special event at the Bishop's Palace, where it was introduced by Charles, Prince of Wales and received by Harry Patch.

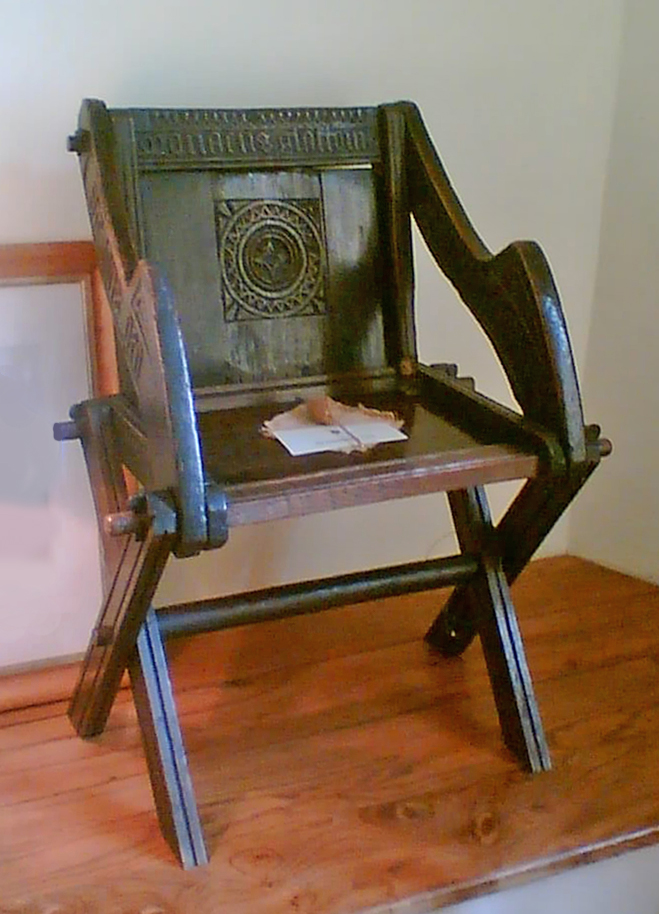
The original Glastonbury chair

=== The Glastonbury Chair ===
One of the two surviving Glastonbury chairs is on display in the palace. It was made in Britain from a description brought back from Rome in 1504 by Abbot Richard Beere to Glastonbury Abbey, and was produced for or by John Arthur Thorne, a monk who was the treasurer at the abbey. Arthur perished on Glastonbury Tor in 1539, hanged, drawn and quartered alongside his master, Richard Whiting, the last Abbot of Glastonbury, during the Dissolution of the Monasteries. The Abbot sat on a Glastonbury chair of this type during his trial at the Bishop's Palace. Other chairs of this age and later reproductions can also be seen.

=== Current use ===
The palace now belongs to the Church Commissioners and is managed and run by The Palace Trust. The main palace is open to the public, including the medieval vaulted undercroft, chapel and a long gallery, although the Bishop's House is still used as a residence and offices. There is a café overlooking the Croquet Lawn. The palace is licensed for weddings and used for conferences and meetings. The croquet lawn in front of the palace is used on a regular basis. The palace was used as a location for some of the scenes in the 2007 British comedy film Hot Fuzz, and more recently in the 2016 film The Huntsman. Other productions that used this location in 2015-2016 included Galavant, Terry and Mason's Great Food Trip, Escape to the Country and Holiday of My Lifetime, in addition to The White Princess.

On 10 December 2013, it was announced that Peter Hancock would become Bishop of Bath and Wells in 2014. A few days earlier, the Church Commissioners had announced that the new bishop would work, but not live, in the Palace; it was later announced that he would instead live, at least temporarily, at The Old Rectory a few miles away at Croscombe.

However, that decision proved controversial. The Bishops' Council formally objected to the Commissioners' decision, and the matter was referred by the Archbishops' Council to a committee which, in May 2014, decided that the house in Croscombe was not suitable to be a see house, and that the bishop should remain living in the Palace. The palace was used as a location in the BBC drama series Poldark, series 3 as the French prison.

== Architecture ==
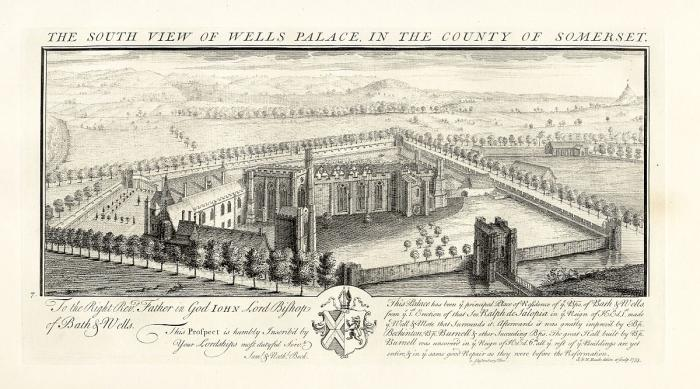
An engraving of the Bishops Palace, Wells made by Samuel and Nathaniel Buck in 1733, showing the wall and moat. The Bishop's Palace is to the left, with the chapel to the right of it and the Great Hall, centre.

=== Bishop's Eye ===
The Bishop's Palace lies within the Liberty of St Andrew, which encloses the cathedral, the Bishop's Palace, Vicar's Close and the residences and offices of the clergy who serve the cathedral. The palace is accessible from the adjacent market place through an archway known as The Bishop's Eye in the gatehouse to the walled precinct. The Bishop's Eye was built around 1450, by Bishop Beckington. It is a three-storey building of Doulting ashlar stone, with a copper roof and has been designated as a Grade I listed building. The Bishop's Eye forms one of a pair with the Penniless Porch which is the gateway into the Cathedral from the market place, which was built at the same time and in a similar style.

=== Bishop's Palace ===
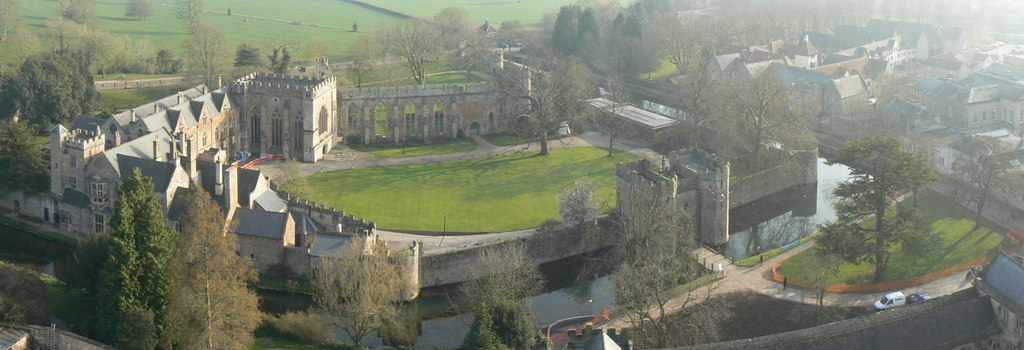
Aerial view of the entirety of the palace, situated in its moat

The palace is a two-storey building of seven bays, with three gables over alternating bays, two of which are supported by buttresses. There is an attic beneath the coped gables and surmounted by octagonal chimney stacks. The interior is laid out with a hall, solar and gallery with an undercroft. It has flagstone floors and a 16th-century stone fireplace.

To the right of the building is an aisless chapel in the early Decorated Gothic style of the late 13th century, built of local stone with Doulting Stone dressings. The remains of the 13th-Century Great Hall are the north wall and some column bases of an internal arcade, indicating that it was a five-bayed aisled hall with crenellations and tall windows in the Decorated Gothic style.

=== Bishop's House ===
The Bishop's House consists of two narrow ranges with a narrow courtyard. The front of the building on the south side is crenellated. The arrangement of the rooms inside has been changed many times over the years. It still includes features from the 15th century including a doorway and oak screens. The windows include some remnants of 16th-century stained glass.

== Grounds ==
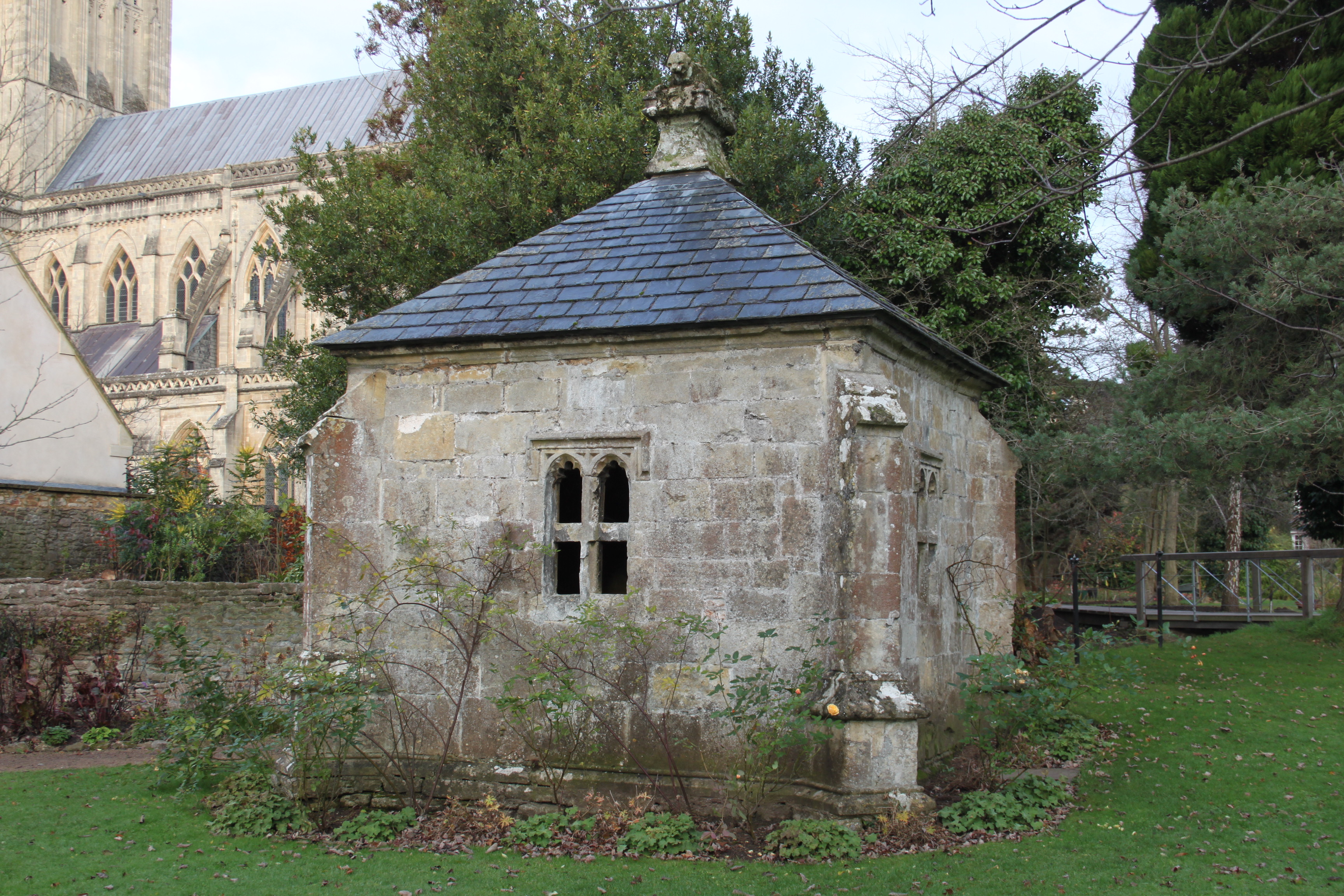
Well House

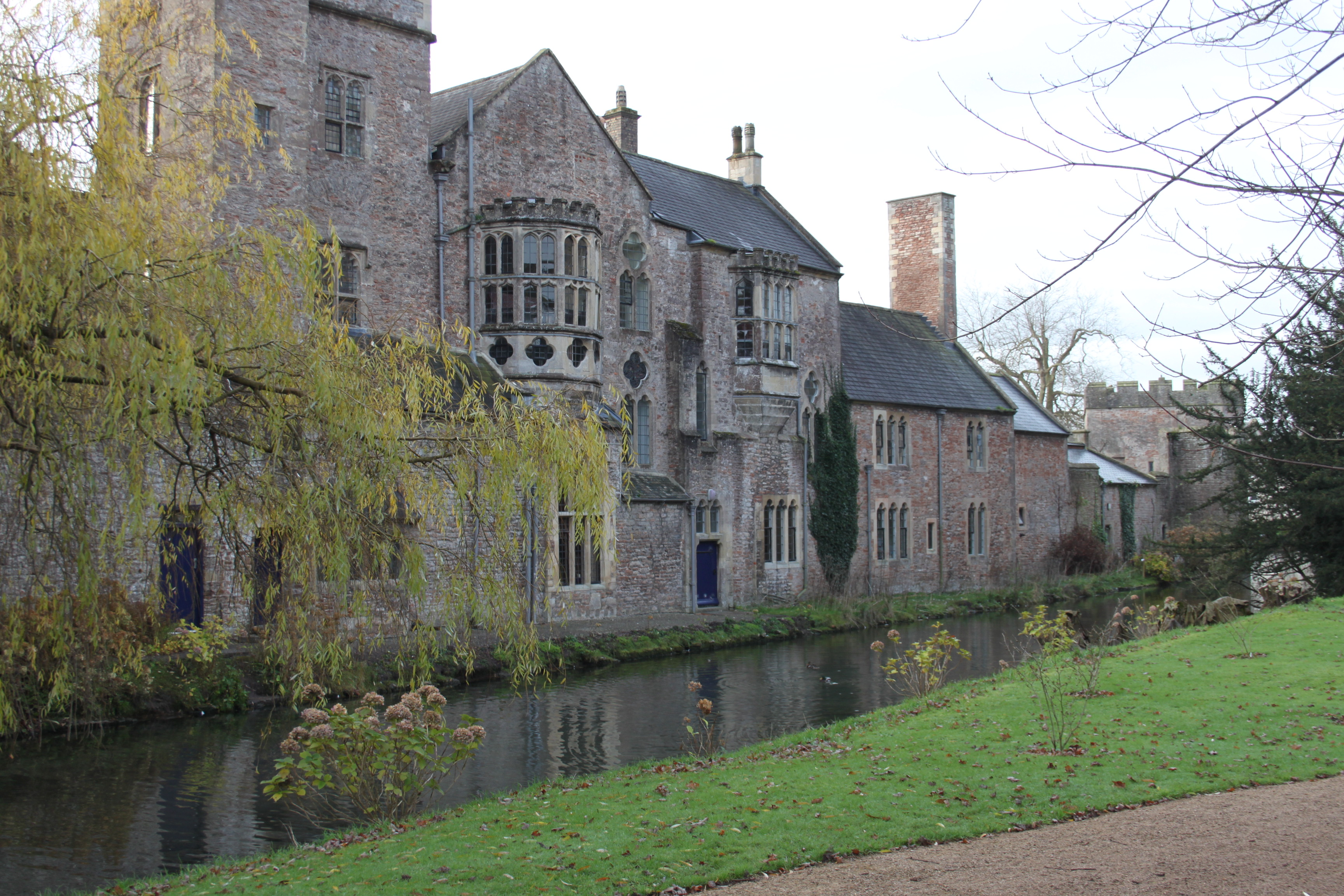
The rear of the Bishop's House above the moat.

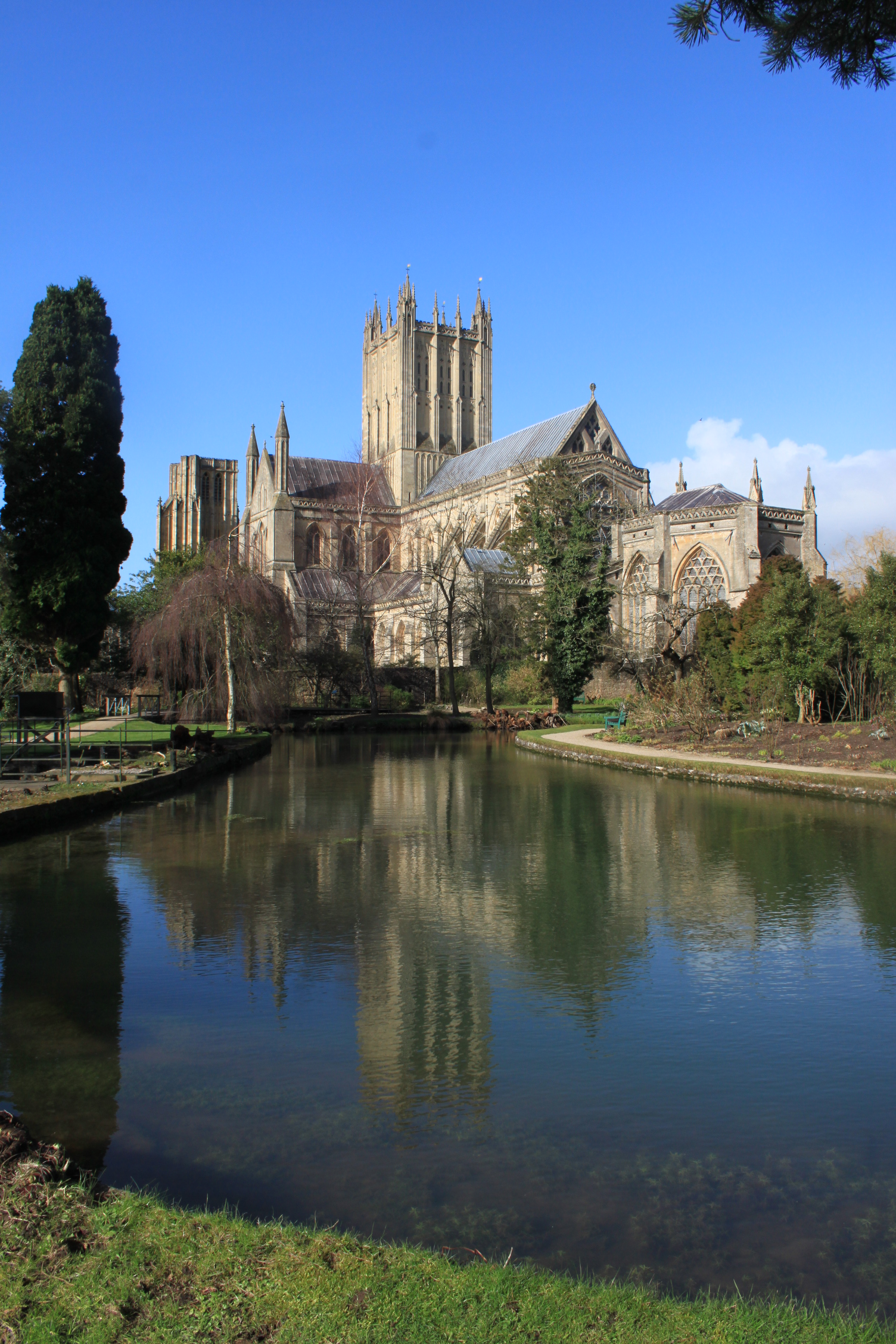
Wells Cathedral seen in the reflecting pool

The grounds of the palace in the 13th century included a medieval deer park. The right to form the park was granted by King John to Bishop Jocelin in 1207. The Palace Camery was planted with orchards, a herbarium and kitchen gardens to provide food for the Bishop and staff.

There are now 14 acres (5.7 ha) of gardens including St Andrew's Spring, from which the city of Wells takes its name. The spring supplies St. Andrew's Well from which water flows at a rate of 40 imperial gallons (180 L) per second into the moat which holds 4 million imperial gallons (18,000,000 L). The water emerging from the spring originates from the cave system of the Mendip Hills including Thrupe Lane Swallet. The Well House was built in 1451, for Bishop Beckington to provide water to the citizens of Wells in the market place. The small stone building with a slate roof has a central hole in the stone floor giving access to the well itself. The gardens are listed, Grade II*, on the Register of Historic Parks and Gardens of special historic interest in England.

The grounds included The Bishop's Barn which was built as a tithe barn in the 15th century, and the area next to it which is now a public park and play area. The barn was built of local stone roughly squared, with Doulting ashlar dressings and a Westmorland slate roof. Royalist troops were quartered in the barn during the Bloody Assizes.

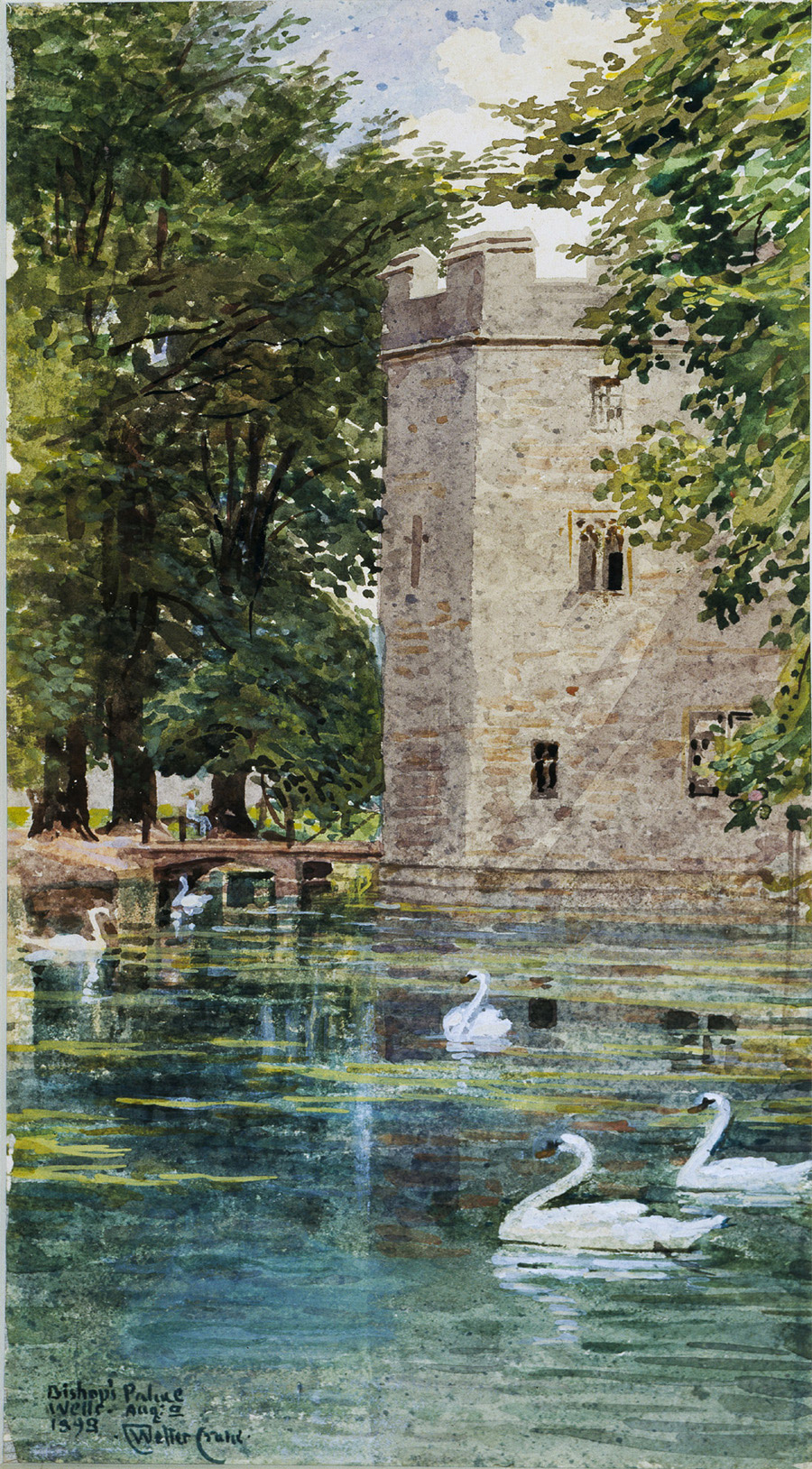
The swans at Bishop's Palace, Wells (painting by Walter Crane, 1893)

Much of the existing landscaping on the south lawn was carried out by Bishop George Henry Law in the 1820s. This included the incorporation of the remains of the roofless great hall and the construction of a raised rampart around the inside of the wall accessible from one of the towers. Bishop Law also created a grotto which he used to display fossils from Banwell Caves which were also part of his estate. A range of trees and shrubs were planted including: a black walnut, Lebanon cedar, catalpa and ginkgo. In the 1830s, Bishop Law had a pool created next to the springs. This acts as a mirror on a still day providing reflections of the east end of the cathedral in the water.

In the outer garden is an arboretum, planted in 1977 by Bishop John Bickersteth to commemorate the Silver Jubilee of Elizabeth II. The mute swans on the moat have been trained to ring bells by pulling strings, to beg for food. The first swans were trained by one of the daughters of Bishop Hervey in the 1870s. Two swans which were given to the bishop by Queen Elizabeth II in 2006, are still able to ring for lunch fed to them by the caretakers who live in the gatehouse.

Every August bank holiday, the moat is used for the Wells Moat Boat Race, a charity raft race organised by Wells Lions Club and Air Training Corps. In 2007, the Bishop entered a raft into the race. In 2013, a "tree of heaven" on the south lawn, which had been planted in 1885, was blown down during the St. Jude storm.

== See also ==
- Grade I listed buildings in Mendip
