= Stephen Patrington =

15th-century Bishop of Chichester and Bishop of St David's

- Bishop of Chichester
- In office: 1417
- Predecessor: Robert Reed
- Successor: Henry Ware
- Previous post: Bishop of St David's

Orders
- Consecration: 8 June 1415

Personal details
- Died: 22 December 1417
- Denomination: Catholic

Stephen Patrington (died 1417) was a medieval Bishop of St. David's and Bishop of Chichester.

Patrington was a Carmelite friar in Oxford in the 1370s, and was drawn into the controversy against John Wyclif by Peter Stokes of the same order. A leading role as author of the Fasciculi Zizaniorum, a collection of documents relating to the controversy, is now assigned to him (in place of the traditional attribution to Thomas Netter). Patrington gained the favour of John of Gaunt, and became prior provincial of his order in 1399.

Patrington was consecrated Bishop of St. David's on 8 June 1415, and translated to Chichester about 17 December 1417.

Patrington died 22 December 1417.

== Citations ==
Catholic Church titles
| Preceded by John Catterick | Bishop of St David's; 1415–1417 | Succeeded by Benedict Nichols |
| Preceded by Robert Reed | Bishop of Chichester; 1417 | Succeeded by Henry Ware |
