= Richard Snetisham =

English churchman

Richard Snetisham was an English medieval churchman and university Chancellor.

Snetisham was Chancellor of the University of Oxford during 1414–15. He was an "excellent disputant and expounder of the scriptures".

Academic offices
Preceded by William Barrowe	Chancellor of the University of Oxford; 1414–1415	Succeeded by William Barrowe
