= Thomas Clare (monk) =

English Benedictine monk and university Chancellor

Thomas Clare was an English medieval Benedictine monk and university Chancellor.

Clare was a Doctor of Theology. He was a Benedictine monk in Bury St Edmunds. In 1409, he was a proctor for the English Benedictines in Pisa.

Clare was twice Chancellor of the University of Oxford in 1416 and 1417.

Academic offices
| Preceded by William Barrowe | Chancellor of the University of Oxford; 1416 | Succeeded by William Barrowe |
| Preceded by William Barrowe | Chancellor of the University of Oxford; 1417 | Succeeded by Walter Trengof |
