= John Kemp =

English cleric and lord chancellor (died 1454)

His Eminence John Kemp
- Cardinal, Archbishop of Canterbury; Primate of All England
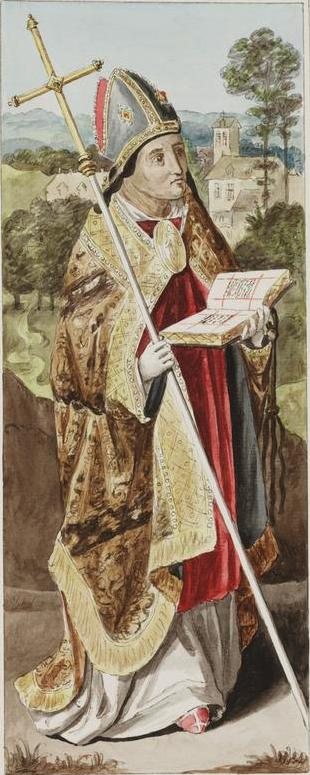
- Church: Catholic Church
- Appointed: 21 July 1452
- Term ended: 22 March 1454
- Predecessor: John Stafford
- Successor: Thomas Bourchier

Orders
- Consecration: 3 December 1419 by Louis d'Harcourt
- Created cardinal: 18 December 1439; (Cardinal priest), and 21 July 1452; (Cardinal bishop)

Personal details
- Born: c. 1380 Olantigh, Kent
- Died: 22 March 1454 Canterbury, Kent
- Buried: Canterbury Cathedral
- Education: Merton College, Oxford

John Kemp (Note: surname also spelled Kempe) (c. 1380 – 22 March 1454) was a medieval English cardinal, Archbishop of Canterbury, and Lord Chancellor of England.

== Biography ==
Kemp was the son of Thomas Kempe, a gentleman of Olantigh, in the parish of Wye near Ashford, Kent, and Beatrix Lewkenor, daughter of Sir Thomas Lewkenor. He was born about 1380 and educated at Merton College, Oxford.

Kemp practised as an ecclesiastical lawyer, was an assessor at the trial of John Oldcastle, and in 1415 was made dean of the Court of Arches but did not do a good job as dean. He then passed into the royal service, and being employed in the administration of Normandy was eventually made chancellor of the duchy. He was briefly archdeacon of Durham. In 1418 he was made Keeper of the Privy Seal which he retained until 1421. Early in 1419 he was elected Bishop of Rochester, and was consecrated at Rouen on 3 December. In February 1421 he was translated to Chichester,and in November following to London.

During the minority of Henry VI Kemp had a prominent position in the English council as a supporter of Henry Beaufort, whom he succeeded as chancellor in March 1426. In this same year on 20 July he was promoted to the Archbishop of York. Kemp held office as chancellor for six years, consistently supporting Henry Beaufort against Humphrey of Gloucester. His resignation on 28 February 1432 was a concession to Gloucester. He still enjoyed Beaufort's favour, and retaining his place in the council was employed on important missions, especially at the congress of Arras in 1435, and the conference at Calais in 1438.

In December 1439 Kemp was created a cardinal priest, and during the next few years took less share in politics. He supported William de la Pole, Earl of Suffolk over the king's marriage with Margaret of Anjou; but afterwards there arose some difference between them, due in part to a dispute about the nomination of the cardinal's nephew, Thomas Kempe, to the bishopric of London. At the time of Suffolk's fall in January 1450 Kemp once more became chancellor. His appointment may have been because he was not committed entirely to either party. In spite of his age and infirmity he showed some vigour in dealing with Jack Cade's rebellion, and by his official experience and skill did what he could for four years to sustain the king's authority.

Kemp was rewarded by his translation to Canterbury in July 1452, when Pope Nicholas V added as a special honour the title of cardinal-bishop of Santa Rufina. As Richard of York gained influence, Kemp became unpopular; men called him "the cursed cardinal", and his fall seemed imminent when he died suddenly on 22 March 1454. He was buried at Canterbury, in the choir.

Kemp was a politician first, and hardly at all a bishop; and he was accused with some justice of neglecting his dioceses, especially at York. Still he was a capable official, and a faithful servant to Henry VI, who called him "one of the wisest lords of the land". He founded Wye College near his birthplace, which became part of the University of London before closing in 2009.

== Bibliography ==
- Fryde, E. B.; Greenway, D. E.; Porter, S.; Roy, I. (1996). Handbook of British Chronology (Third revised ed.). Cambridge: Cambridge University Press. ISBN 0-521-56350-X.
- Hook, Walter Farquhar (1867). Lives of the Archbishops of Canterbury. Vol. V. London: Richard Bentley. pp. 188–267.

Political offices
Preceded by Henry Ware	Lord Privy Seal; 1418–1421	Succeeded by John Stafford
Preceded by Henry Beaufort	Lord Chancellor; 1426–1432	Succeeded by John Stafford
Preceded by John Stafford	Lord Chancellor; 1450–1454	Succeeded by The Earl of Salisbury
Catholic Church titles
Preceded by Richard Young	Bishop of Rochester; 1419–1421	Succeeded by John Langdon
Preceded by Henry Ware	Bishop of Chichester; 1421–1422	Succeeded by Thomas Polton
Preceded by Richard Clifford	Bishop of London; 1422–1426	Succeeded by William Grey
Preceded by Richard Fleming	Archbishop of York; 1426–1452	Succeeded by William Booth
Preceded by John Stafford	Archbishop of Canterbury; 1452–1454	Succeeded by Thomas Bourchier
Preceded by Bandello Bandelli	Cardinal Priest of Santa Balbina; 1439–1452	Succeeded by Amico Agnifili
Preceded by John of Toledo	Cardinal-bishop of Santa Rufina; 1452–1454	Succeeded by Bernard de Languissel
