= Henry Ware (bishop of Chichester) =

15th-century Bishop of Chichester

- Bishop of Chichester
- Elected: 28 February 1418
- Term ended: July 1420
- Predecessor: Stephen Patrington
- Successor: John Kempe

Orders
- Consecration: 17 July 1417

Personal details
- Died: July 1420
- Denomination: Catholic

Henry Ware (died 1420) was a medieval clergyman who became a diplomat and Lord Privy Seal for King Henry V of England from 1416 to 1418. He later became the Bishop of Chichester. Originally from Wales, Ware served as a canon from the 1390s and then studied law, of which he was made a master, at Oxford University. He later became an official in the court at Canterbury. He also spent some time in diplomatic missions to France. In early 1418 he was elected bishop of Chichester, and was consecrated in July 1418. He died in July 1420, between the 7th and the 26th.

== Early life ==
Ware almost certainly was from Glamorgan in Wales. He probably came from a modest background, as in his will he referred to a brother and ‘poor kinsfolk’, and to his sister, Margaret, who married one John Hayward. Despite this apparent relative lack of advantage in his early life, Ware went on to Oxford University, where he studied law, and was a MA by 1399.

== Career ==
Ware's earliest post was in Glamorgan as a canon of Llandaff, by May 1394 and as rector of Marcross by 1398. His career was twofold. He had become a notary public by 30 July 1398 and was still active in this on 28 February 1402, as he is known to have witnessed an actum by Archbishop Thomas Arundel at Lambeth. In June 1402 the archbishop appointed him as scribe and Henry was soon sitting over legal disputes in the diocese on Arundel's behalf. By July 1408 he was official of the court of Canterbury and he continued in this post till at least 1416.

Ware was appointed Keeper of the Privy Seal, for Henry V, on 11 September 1416. He was a member of a mission sent, on 12 March 1417, to seek a peace treaty with France and Burgundy. On his return to England he spent some time sorting out various disputes that had arisen in his absence.

On 14 May 1414 the crown awarded Ware the Parish of Tring, Hertfordshire.

On 28 February 1418 Ware was elected and confirmed by Pope Martin V, to the see of Chichester. Consequently, he was then required to renounce, in the presence of the king, any papal requirements that would be prejudicial to the authority of the crown. He was consecrated at Pont de l'Arche in Normandy on 17 July 1418.

Also in 1418, Ware joined a royal expedition to Normandy, again as part of a diplomatic mission to seek a treaty with the Dauphin on 26 October. He had previously resigned from his position as keeper of the privy seal on 21 September 1418, presumably because of his forthcoming trip to France. Ware was involved in further talks on 22 January 1419 and 8 March 1419.

Ware evidently returned to England shortly after March 1419 as he was listed at a convocation in October 1419, and he is known to have been in Chichester on 10 December 1419.

== Death ==
Ware seems to have become sick on his return to England, as he undertook very little formal business. He made his will on the 7 July 1420 and died shortly afterwards between 7 and 26 July.

In his will Ware asked for an ‘old bible’ to be returned to Margam Abbey, and left vestments to St Buruoc's, Barry. He also left money for repairs to the Bishop's Palace at Chichester.

Ware was buried, as requested, in Chichester Cathedral.

== Citations ==
Political offices
Preceded by John Wakering	Lord Privy Seal; 1416–1418	Succeeded by John Kemp
Catholic Church titles
Preceded by Stephen Patrington	Bishop of Chichester; 1418–1420	Succeeded by John Kempe
