= Walter Trengof =

English churchman and university Chancellor

- Archdeacon of Cornwall
- Church: Catholic Church
- Diocese: Diocese of Exeter
- Installed: 2 October 1436
- Term ended: 1442
- Predecessor: William Fylham
- Successor: Richard Helyer
- Previous posts

Chancellor of the University of Oxford
- In office 1417–1419
- Preceded by: Thomas Clare
- Succeeded by: Robert Colman
- In office 1419–1420
- Preceded by: Robert Colman
- Succeeded by: Thomas Rodborne
- In office 1419–1420
- Preceded by: Thomas Rodborne
- Succeeded by: John Castell

Personal details
- Died: 1445

Walter Trengof (or Treugof, died 1445) was an English medieval churchman and university Chancellor.

Trengof attended Exeter College, Oxford. He was three times Chancellor of the University of Oxford during 1417–21. From 1436 until his death in 1445, he was the Archdeacon of Cornwall.

Academic offices
| Preceded by Thomas Clare | Chancellor of the University of Oxford; 1417–1419 | Succeeded by Robert Colman |
| Preceded by Robert Colman | Chancellor of the University of Oxford; 1419–1420 | Succeeded by Thomas Rodborne |
| Preceded by Thomas Rodborne | Chancellor of the University of Oxford; 1420–1421 | Succeeded by John Castell |
