= Linwood, Lincolnshire =

Village and civil parish in Lincolnshire, England

Coordinates: 53.364400°N 0.333085°W

Linwood
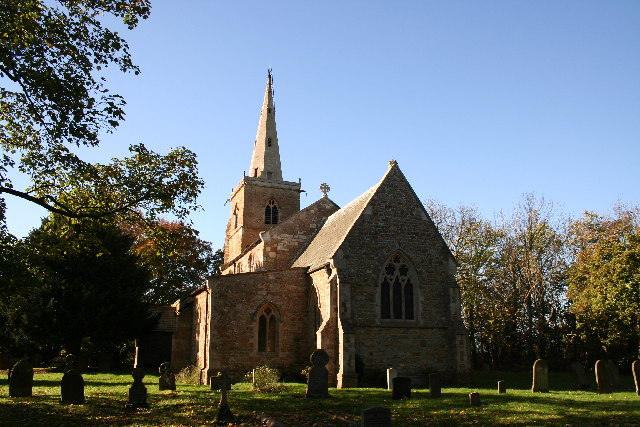
- Church of St. Cornelius, Linwood

- Location within Lincolnshire
- Population: 143 (2011)
- OS grid reference: TF110865
  - London: 130 mi (210 km) S
- District: West Lindsey
- Shire county: Lincolnshire
- Region: East Midlands
- Country: England
- Sovereign state: United Kingdom
- Post town: Market Rasen
- Postcode district: LN8
- Police: Lincolnshire
- Fire: Lincolnshire
- Ambulance: East Midlands
- UK Parliament: Gainsborough

Linwood is a small village and civil parish in the West Lindsey district of Lincolnshire, England, on the minor B1202 road about 2 miles (3 km) south from the town of Market Rasen. The population (including Buslingthorpe) at the 2011 census was 143.

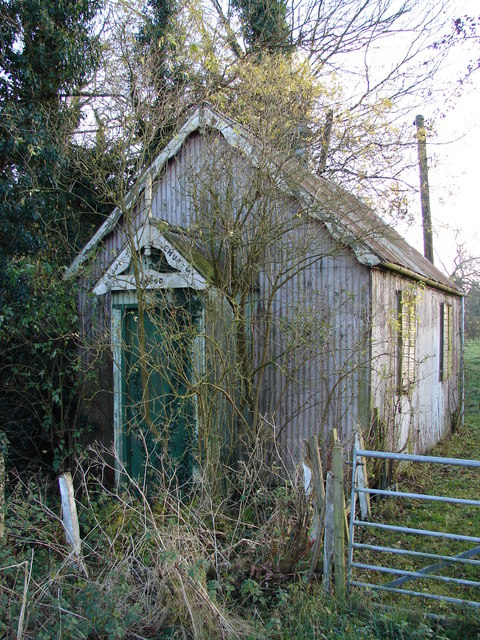
Little Pink Church, Linwood

The parish church, dedicated to St. Cornelius, dates from the late 12th century and is a Grade I listed building.

Linwood is part of a major woodland conservation area, centred on Linwood Warren 1.5 miles (2.4 km) to the north-east, and is a primary target area to promote and encourage the repopulation of the Woodlark (Lullula arborea), a native bird that has become almost extinct locally. In 2005 the population had been raised to approximately 50 breeding pairs and 60 other male birds, after more than 15 years of work monitored by the Lincolnshire Bird Club.

Linwood is the birthplace of William Lyndwood.
