= Thomas Rodborne =

English churchman and university chancellor

Thomas Rodborne DD
- Bishop of St Davids
- Church: Catholic Church
- Diocese: Diocese of St Davids; Diocese of Norwich
- Installed: 31 January 1434
- Term ended: 1442 (before 27 June)
- Predecessor: Benedict Nichols
- Successor: William Lyndwood
- Previous posts: Archdeacon of Sudbury (13 March 1414 – 18 April 1429)

Chancellor of the University of Oxford
- In office 1420
- Preceded by: Walter Treugof
- Succeeded by: Walter Treugof

Warden of Merton College, Oxford
- In office 1416–1417
- Preceded by: Edmund Bekyngham
- Succeeded by: Robert Gilbert

Personal details
- Died: 1442 (before 27 June)

Thomas Rodborne DD (also Rodeborne, Rodebourne, Rodbourne, Rudbourne, or Rodburn, died 1442) was an English medieval churchman and university chancellor.

Rodborne was a fellow of The Queen's College, Oxford, where he taught Henry V mathematics. He became a proctor in 1402 and was the warden of Merton College, Oxford, from 1416 to 1417. He was chancellor of the University of Oxford during 1420. He became Archdeacon of Sudbury. From 1433 until his death in 1442, he was Bishop of St David's in Wales.

Academic offices
Preceded by Edmund Bekyngham	Warden of Merton College, Oxford; 1416–1417	Succeeded by Robert Gilbert
Preceded by Walter Trengof	Chancellor of the University of Oxford; 1420	Succeeded by Walter Trengof
Catholic Church titles
Preceded by Benedict Nichols	Bishop of St David's; 1433–1442	Succeeded by William Lyndwood
