= William Barrow (bishop) =

15th-century Bishop of Carlisle and Bishop of Bangor

- Bishop of Carlisle
- Appointed: 19 April 1423
- Term ended: 4 September 1429
- Predecessor: Roger Whelpdale
- Successor: Marmaduke Lumley
- Previous post: Bishop of Bangor

Orders
- Consecration: after 13 October 1419

Personal details
- Died: 4 September 1429
- Denomination: Roman Catholic

William Barrow (or Barrowe; died 1429) was a Bishop of Bangor and a Bishop of Carlisle.

Barrow served three times as Chancellor of the University of Oxford during 1413–17.

Barrow was selected as Bishop of Bangor on 15 February 1418, and consecrated after 13 October 1419. He was transferred from Bangor to Carlisle on 19 April 1423. He died on 4 September 1429.

== Citations ==
Academic offices
Preceded by William Sulburge	Chancellor of the University of Oxford; 1413–1414	Succeeded by Richard Snetisham
Preceded by Richard Snetisham	Chancellor of the University of Oxford; 1415–1416	Succeeded by Thomas Clare
Preceded by Thomas Clare	Chancellor of the University of Oxford; 1416–1417	Succeeded by Thomas Clare
Catholic Church titles
Preceded by Benedict Nichols	Bishop of Bangor; 1418–1423	Succeeded by Nicholas Clitherow
Preceded by Roger Whelpdale	Bishop of Carlisle; 1423–1429	Succeeded by Marmaduke Lumley
