= Benedict Nichols =

English bishop (died 1433)

- Bishop of St David's
- Province: Canterbury
- Diocese: St David's
- Installed: 1 June 1418
- Term ended: 25 June 1433
- Predecessor: Stephen Patrington
- Successor: Thomas Rodburn
- Other posts: Bishop of Bangor, 1408 to 1417

Orders
- Ordination: unknown
- Consecration: 1408

Personal details
- Born: unknown
- Died: 25 June 1433 St David's
- Denomination: Roman Catholic

Benedict Nichols, also spelt Nicholls (died 25 June 1433), was a priest and bishop of the Roman Catholic Church, successively a parish priest in England, a canon of Salisbury Cathedral, and Bishop of Bangor and Bishop of St David's in Wales.

He took part in the trial of Sir John Oldcastle in 1413 and in 1415 was with King Henry V at the capture of Harfleur.

== Life ==
Nichols is recorded as holding the benefice of Conington, in Cambridgeshire, and immediately before becoming a bishop was rector of Stalbridge in Dorset and a canon of Salisbury Cathedral in Wiltshire.

Nichols's first major chance of preferment came with the collapse of the Glyndŵr Rising against the English in Wales, led by Owain Glyndŵr. King Henry IV was anxious to replace Lewis Byford, a supporter of Glyndŵr, as Bishop of Bangor, and John Trevor, a brother-in-law of Glyndŵr's, as Bishop of St Asaph. On 1 May 1408, at Lucca, Pope Gregory XII was persuaded to relieve Bishop Lewis Byford from his obligation to his see, even though Byford had not been heard, and to provide Nichols to the vacancy. Nichols was consecrated on 12 August 1408, and by October 1409, with the English forces having strengthened their hold on Wales, it was possible for him to be enthroned at Bangor Cathedral.

On 25 September 1413 Nichols was present at the trial for heresy of Sir John Oldcastle, leader of the Lollards, by an ecclesiastical court. One writer later noted that Nichols "acquired dishonorable celebrity in the early period of the reformation, from being one of the bishops who assisted the archbishop of Canterbury in the condemnation of Sir John Oldcastle, Lord Cobham, for heresy".

Early in 1415, Henry Beaufort, Bishop of Winchester, commissioned Nichols to lay the foundation stone for Sheen Priory.

In September 1415, Nichols was in the service of King Henry V at the capture of Harfleur, serving as Chaplain of the King's retinue, when on the instructions of the king he was placed in charge of a group of hostages. He told them

Do not be afraid, and do not suspect that we will do you any harm. Our lord, the King of England, does not come to France to ruin the country which by right is his own. He will not behave at Harfleur as your own countrymen behaved at Soissons. We are good Christians.

He was translated to St David's on 15 December 1417, the Pope's bull to effect this being dated "xviii Cal. Januar.", made the profession of obedience to the Archbishop of Canterbury on 12 February 1417/18, and received possession of the temporalities there on 1 June 1418. He was succeeded at Bangor by William Barrow, who had previously served as Chancellor of the University of Oxford.

In 1431, Nichols confirmed that the vicars choral of St David's Cathedral were to sit and stand in the choir in accordance with the Sarum Use.

He died in office at St David's on 25 June 1433, leaving a Will dated 4 June 1433 which was proved on 14 August, and was entombed in the cathedral, where the whereabouts of his tomb is now unknown. It has been suggested that one of the defaced monuments in the south aisle may be his.

== Notes ==
Religious titles
Preceded by Stephen Patrington	Bishop of St David's; 1417–1433	Succeeded by Thomas Rodburn
Preceded by Griffin Yonge	Bishop of Bangor; 1408–1417	Succeeded by William Barrow
