= Robert Colman =

English Franciscan friar and university Chancellor

Robert Colman DD (or Coleman, died 1428) was an English medieval Franciscan friar and university Chancellor.

Colman received his Doctor of Divinity from Oxford University. He was at the Franciscan friary in Norwich. Among other works, he wrote Sermons, Sacred Lessons, and A Book of Sundry Poems. He was known for his "eloquence, erudition, wit, and judgment".

Colman was Chancellor of the University of Oxford in 1419. He resigned from the position in the same year and died in 1428.

Academic offices
Preceded by Walter Trengof	Chancellor of the University of Oxford; 1419	Succeeded by Walter Trengof
