= Vicars' Close, Wells =

Street in Wells, Somerset

Vicars' Close
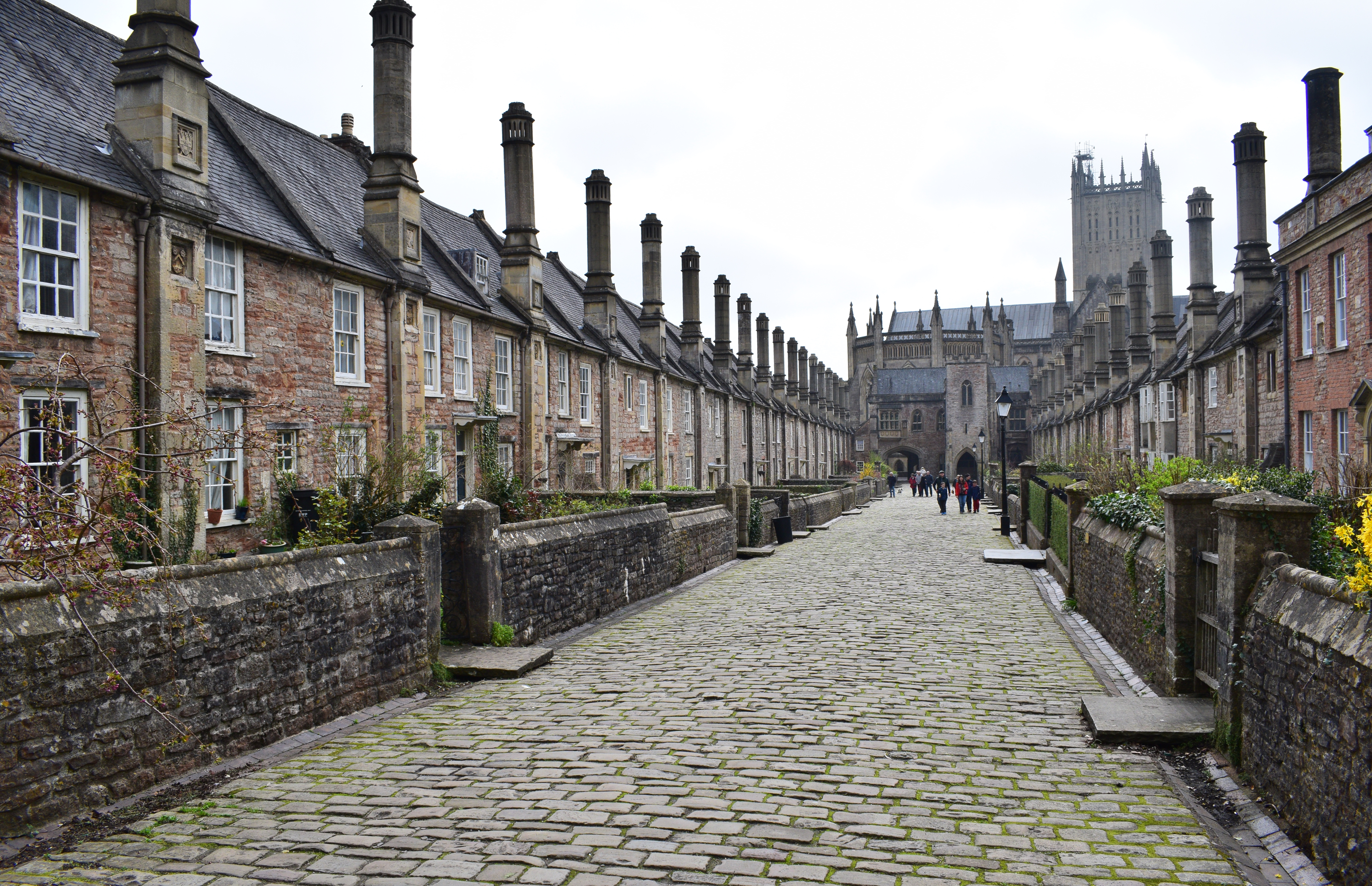
- Vicars' Close looking towards Wells Cathedral
- Interactive map of Vicars' Close
- Type: Dead end street
- Owner: Wells Cathedral
- Length: 140 m (460 ft)
- Location: Wells, Somerset
- Coordinates: 51°12′41″N 2°38′37″W

Construction
- Construction start: 1348
- Completion: 1430

Other
- Known for: Oldest purely residential street with its original buildings all surviving intact in Europe.
- Status: Grade I listed buildings

Vicars' Close is a dead end street in Wells, Somerset. It is reportedly Europe's oldest residential street with the original buildings still intact. John Julius Norwich called it "that rarest of survivals, a planned street of the mid-14th century". It consists of numerous Grade I listed buildings, totalling 27 residences (originally 44), built for Bishop Ralph of Shrewsbury, a chapel and library at the north end, and a hall at the south end, over an arched gate. It is connected at its southern end to Wells Cathedral by a walkway over Chain Gate.

The close is about 140 metres (460 ft) long, and paved with setts. Its width is tapered by 3 metres (9.8 ft) to make it look longer when viewed from the main entrance nearest the cathedral. When viewed from the other end, it looks shorter. By the nineteenth century, the buildings were reported to be in a poor state of repair, and part of the hall was being used as a malt house. Repairs have since been carried out, including the construction of Shrewsbury House to replace buildings damaged in a fire. A further major restoration began in 2024.

The Vicars' Hall was completed in 1348 and included a communal dining room, administrative offices and treasury of the Vicars Choral. The houses on each side of the close were built in the 14th and early 15th centuries. Since then, alterations have been made, including a unified roof, front gardens and raised chimneys. The final part of the construction of the close was during the 1420s, when the Vicars' Chapel and Library was constructed on the wall of the Liberty of St Andrew. The southern face includes shields commemorating the bishops of the time. The interior is decorated with 19th-century gesso work by Heywood Sumner and the building now used by Wells Cathedral School.

== Origins ==
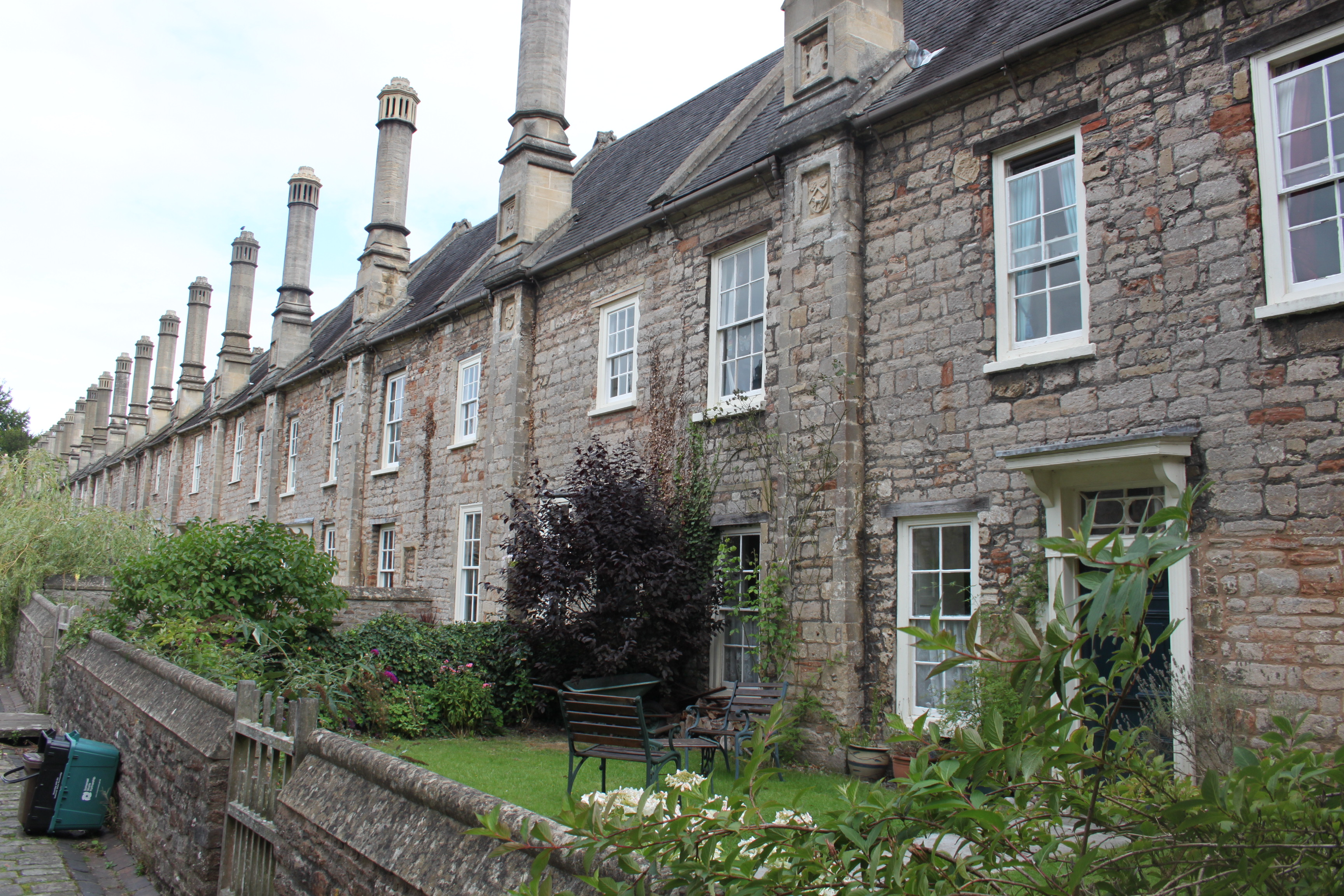
Numbers 1 to 13

The Close owes its origins to a grant of land and buildings by Walter de Hulle, a canon of Wells Cathedral, for the purpose of accommodating chantry priests; however, the land is likely to have been used for a long period before the construction of the close, as prehistoric flint flakes and Romano-British pottery shards were recovered from the garden of number four during work to construct an extension.

At the time church singers were referred to as "vicars choral". Bishop Jocelin of Wells styled the priests serving the cathedral as the Vicars Choral, in the 12th century, their duty being to chant divine service eight times a day. Previously they had lived throughout the town, and Bishop Ralph resolved to incorporate them and provide subsistence for the future. The Vicars Choral were assigned annuities from his lands and tenements in Congresbury and Wookey and an annual fee from the vicarage of Chew, and he endowed them with lands obtained from the Feoffees of Walter de Hulle. The residences he built became known as the College, or Close of the Vicars.

== Vicars' Hall and gateway ==
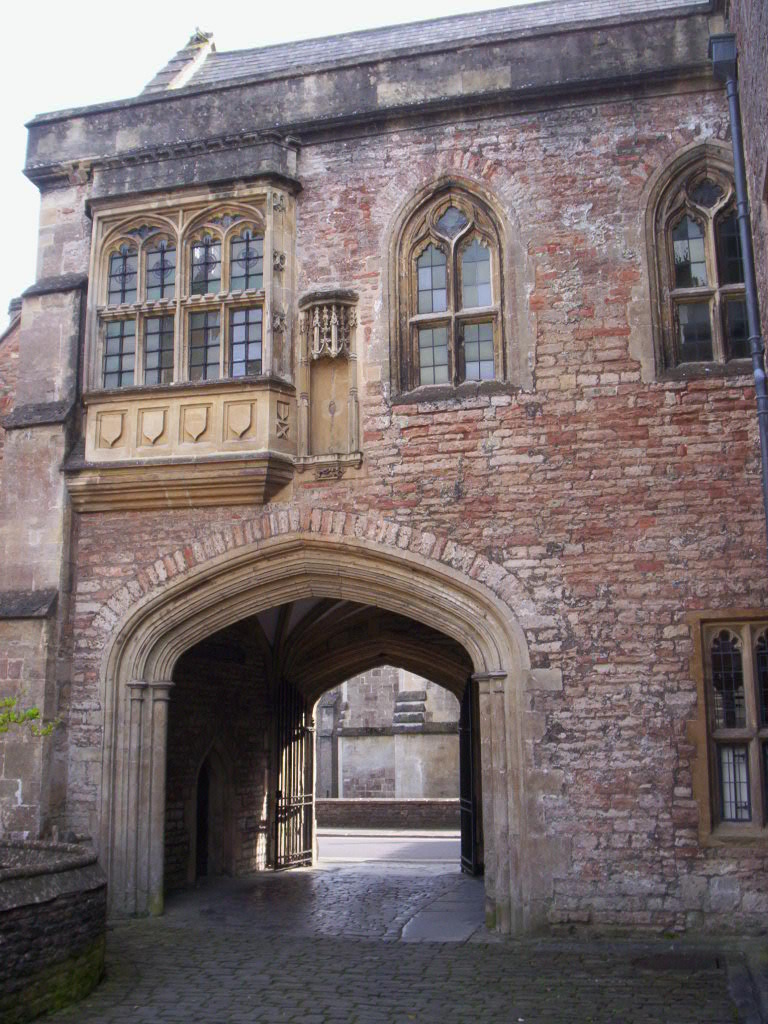
Vicars' hall over gateway leading from Vicars' Close to St Andrew Street

The entrance arch into the close comprises a pedestrian gate adjacent to a waggon gate, and has a lierne vault ceiling. The four-centered rere-arches may have been by William Joy or Thomas Witney his predecessor as master mason of the cathedral.

The first parts of the Close to be constructed were this first floor barrel-roofed common hall above a store room, kitchen and bakehouse which were completed in 1348. The fireplace, with a lectern, and the east window with stained glass, were added in the 15th century. A room known as The Chequer above the staircase was added in the early 15th century. It has a large fireplace which may have been enlarged following a fire. One of the vicars known as The Receiver sat in the room to receive rents and other funds due to the vicars, which were kept in a large chest dating from 1633. Next to The Chequer is the Muniment Room which has a filing cabinet dating from around 1420 used to hold documents such as leases of land. Beneath these rooms is The Treasury which has ten cupboards where the vicars vestments were stored.

In the 19th-century parts of the hall found use as a malt house, and as a library for the Theological College. The western half of the building was added around 1862 by John Henry Parker.

The Chain Gate, built with Doulting stone, was abutted to the hall in 1459 by Thomas Beckington. This included a gallery over the gate into the cathedral for the vicars' convenience.

== Vicars' Chapel and Library ==
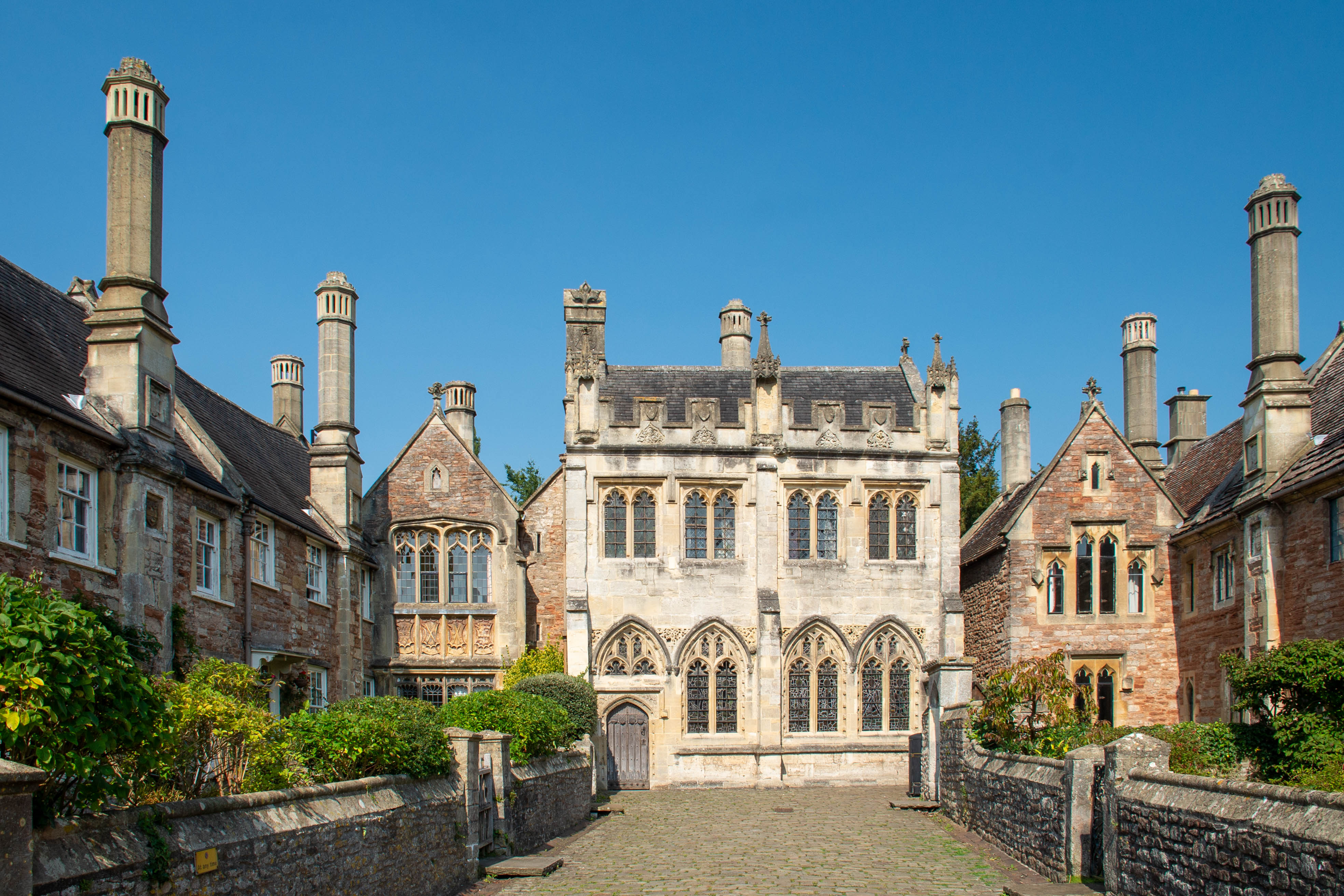
Vicars' Chapel and Library

The chapel was built between 1424 and 1430 at the north end of the close. It is eight degrees out of alignment with the rest of the close. This is because the northern wall of the chapel was built on top of the old wall enclosing the Liberty of St Andrew. The Liberty encompassed 52 acres (21 ha) broadly situated to the east of the city centre of Wells. The main part of the Liberty formed a walled precinct within the city (which was otherwise not walled) and this included Wells Cathedral, the Cathedral Green, the Bishop's Palace, the Old Deanery, and the Vicars' Close. To compensate for the misalignment of the chapel the roof slopes to the west so that it appears level from the close.

Most of the Vicars' Chapel is rubble masonry; however, the south face which can be seen from the close is of white Conglomerate quarried locally. The shields on the wall are those of Nicholas Bubwith, suggesting that construction was started during his reign as bishop between 1407 and 1424, and John Stafford who was bishop from 1424 until 1443 suggesting that construction was completed under his episcopate. The lower floor was a chapel, and a spiral stair led up to the library. The chapel was dedicated to the Assumption of the Blessed Virgin Mary and St Katherine. It is now used by the chaplain of Wells Cathedral School. The interior is decorated with 19th-century gesso work by Heywood Sumner.

== Residences ==
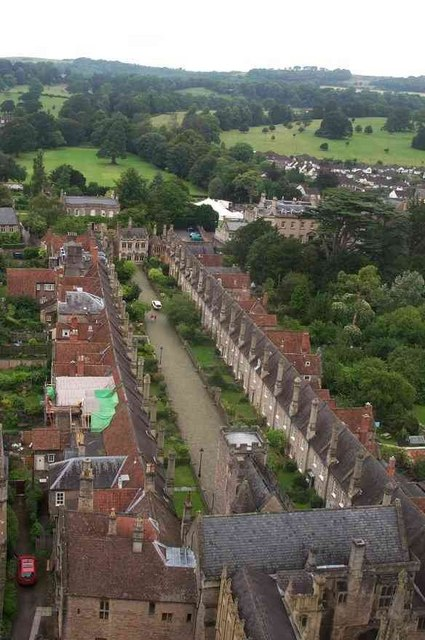
The close seen from the tower of the Wells Cathedral.

The residences are built of stone from the Mercia Mudstone Group. There were originally 22 houses on the east side and 20 on the west. They line each side of an elongated quadrangle which appears longer than it is because of false perspective achieved by building the houses at the upper northern end nearest the chapel 2.7 metres (8 ft 10 in) closer together than those at the lower southern end closest to the Vicars' Hall. Each house originally comprised a ground floor hall of approximately 6.1 by 4 metres (20 by 13 ft) and an upper floor of the same size. Both had a fireplace in the front wall. Washing facilities and a latrine were outside the back door. The date of some of the buildings is unclear but it is known that some had been built by 1363 and the rest were completed by 1412. There were originally 42 houses, each for one vicar; however, a charter of c.1582 Queen Elizabeth restricted the number of vicars to twenty, and the Vicars Choral currently number twelve men. No. 1 Vicars' Close was once a larger property, but has since been divided and part of the building is now called No. 1 St. Andrew Street.

Following the 16th-century Reformation when clerical marriage was permitted, larger households would have been required and as a result some of the houses were altered and combined, by knocking through walls, into larger dwellings. Others had extensions built to the rear. Water supply was originally from two wells, one at each end of the close. By 1468 lead pipes had been installed to bring water into the houses, although the wells continued to function until the 19th century. Number 22 is the house which still has most of its original medieval structure as it was originally built.

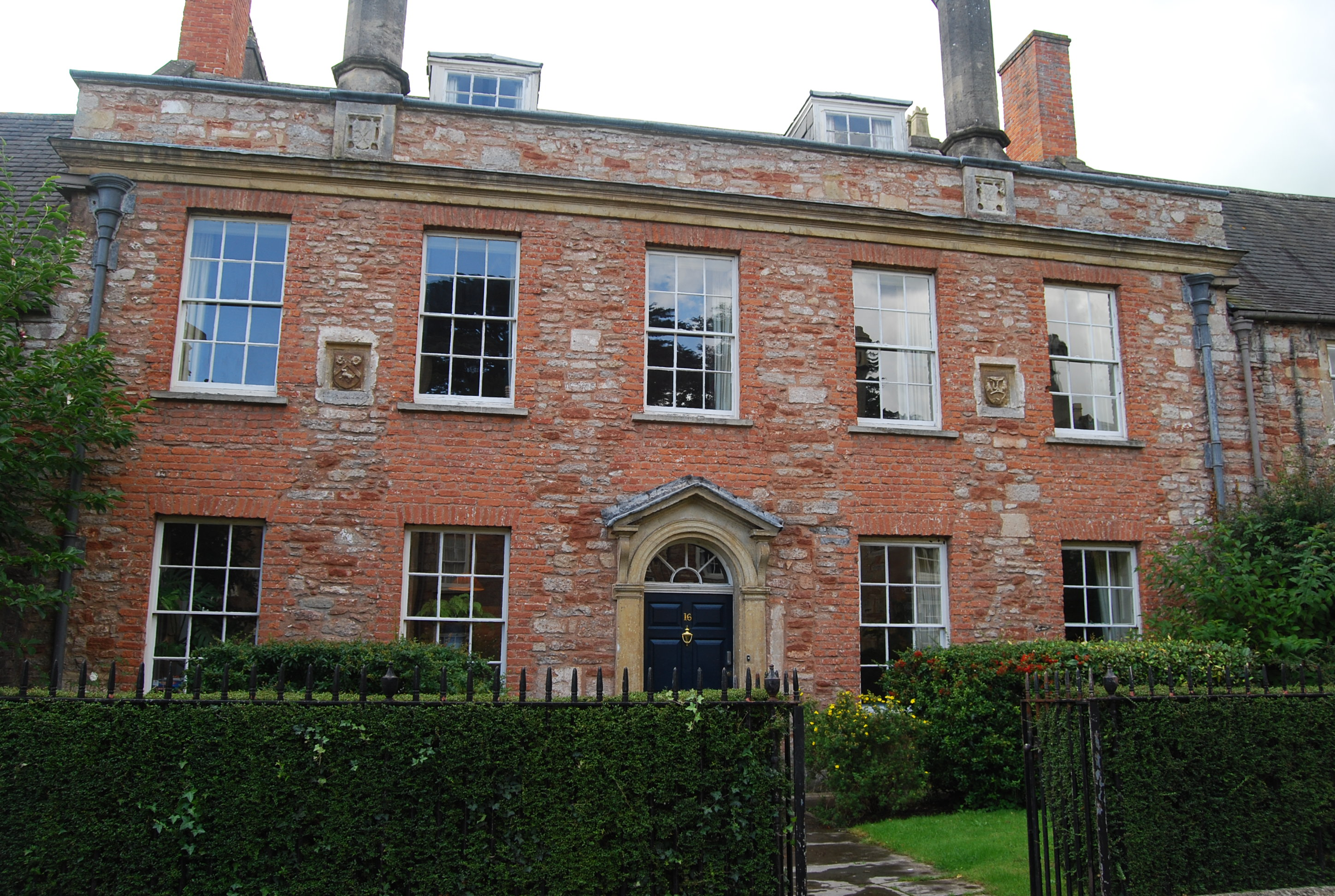
Shrewsbury House

In the fifteenth century, Bishop Thomas Beckington left much of his estate to the Vicars' Choral, enabling repairs to be carried out. The gardens in front of the houses were not part of the original scheme, with the garden walls being added as part of this development. The walls are on average 4 metres (13 ft) from the front of the houses. He unified the appearance of the terraces, including the installation of a single arch-braced and wind-braced trussed sloping roof around 1466. The chimney shafts were renewed and raised, possibly because of the introduction of coal as the fuel rather than wood. Each stack incorporates two heraldic shields and the upper sections of the stacks are octagonal. The shields are those of the Bishop, a beacon above tun, and the arms of his three executors: sugar loaves for Hugh Sugar, three swans for Richard Swan, and a talbot for John Pope. Many of the original windows were replaced in the 18th century. Shrewsbury House is architecturally different from all the other buildings; it was rebuilt in the 19th century after a fire that burnt down the original structure.

== Restoration ==
In 2024 the cathedral announced plans, and fundraising, for a project to restore the close and to open some of its buildings to the public. £4.4m towards the envisaged £7m total cost of the restoration was secured from the National Heritage Lottery Fund. Work is intended to be completed by 2027. While supportive of the endeavour, the Victorian Society called for steps to ensure that the work of a range of important Victorian architects represented at the close was protected and explained to visitors. This included the Sumner gesso work; contributions to the chapel by Sumner, J. D. Sedding and Henry Wilson; and the decorative schemes executed by William Burges, working within a restoration led by J. H.Parker, in the Vicars' Hall and in a number of the houses in the close. (Note: J. Mordaunt Crook, Burges's biographer, recalled the contemporary reaction to the unveiling of Burges's stenciled decoration of the Vicar's Hall and undercroft; "The visitors were astonished and delighted... [and] broke forth into applause, which was again and again renewed".) The restoration has multiple aims: the opening up of some of the close's buildings to visitors to encourage appreciation of the close's unique architecture; the improvement of the living standards of the residents of the close, with many of the houses being subject to damp and water ingress; and efforts to address concerns over the prevalent culture among residential staff in the close, which an independent safeguarding report in 2024 identified as one of "unhappiness and fear". The new dean, appointed after his predecessor's resignation following the publication of the report, spoke of "a new culture [.] being built with positivity and hope".

== See also ==
Residences of other Vicars’ Choral:

- Vicars' Court, Lincoln
- College of Minor Canons, St Paul’s London
- Exeter
- Hereford
- Bedern, York
