= Robert Waldby =

Archbishop of York from 1396 to 1398

- Archbishop of York
- Appointed: 5 October 1396
- Term ended: 6 January 1398
- Predecessor: Thomas Arundel
- Successor: Richard le Scrope
- Other posts: Archbishop of Dublin; Bishop of Chichester

Personal details
- Died: 29 December 1397
- Buried: Westminster Abbey
- Denomination: Roman Catholic

Robert Waldby (died 1397) was a native of York and friar of the Order of Saint Augustine who followed Edward, the Black Prince into Aquitaine, and undertook a number of diplomatic missions on his behalf. After studying at Toulouse, he became professor of theology there. He later became close to Edward's son, King Richard II. He was a firm opponent of John Wycliffe, wrote a book denouncing him, and was a member of the Synod which assembled at Oxford in 1382 to judge his orthodoxy.

There is a possibility that Waldby was Bishop of Sodor and Man in 1381, although at the time John Dongan was the bishop from 1374 to 1391. He definitely became Bishop of Aire in Gascony in 1387, and Chancellor of Aquitaine, and translated to the archbishopric of Dublin in Ireland on 14 November 1390, with the strong support of King Richard. He received the temporalities of the See in July 1391. He was given money and troops to defend Leinster, the one province under more or less secure English rule, against hostile Irish clans, and succeeded in relieving Naas, County Kildare. He was apparently most unhappy in Ireland, and was even prepared to accept a junior English bishopric in order to come home. After five years in Dublin, he translated to the bishopric of Chichester in England on 25 October 1395, and finally became Archbishop of York on 5 October 1396.

Waldby died on 29 December 1397 with his bishopric being sede vacante on 6 January 1398. He was buried in the Chapel of St. Edmund in Westminster Abbey, where his monumental brass still remains.

== Citations ==
Catholic Church titles
Preceded by Jean de Montaut	Bishop of Aire; 1386–1390	Succeeded by Maurice Usk
Preceded by Robert Wikeford	Archbishop of Dublin; 1390–1395	Succeeded by Richard Northalis
Preceded by Richard Mitford	Bishop of Chichester; 1395–1397	Succeeded by Robert Reade
Preceded by Thomas Arundel	Archbishop of York; 1397–1398	Succeeded by Richard le Scrope
