= Roger Whelpdale =

15th-century Bishop of Carlisle

- Bishop of Carlisle
- Appointed: 22 December 1419
- Term ended: 4 February 1423
- Predecessor: William Strickland
- Successor: William Barrow

Orders
- Consecration: after March 1420

Personal details
- Died: 4 February 1423
- Denomination: Catholic

Roger Whelpdale (died 1423) was an English priest and Bishop of Carlisle from 1419 until 1423. He was selected as bishop on 22 December 1419, and consecrated after March 1420. He was also Provost of The Queen's College, Oxford, from 1404 to 1421.

Whelpdale died on 4 February 1423.

== Citations ==
Catholic Church titles
Preceded by William Strickland	Bishop of Carlisle; 1420–1423	Succeeded by William Barrow
