= William Lyndwood =

English bishop of St. David's, diplomat and canonist

- Bishop of St Davids
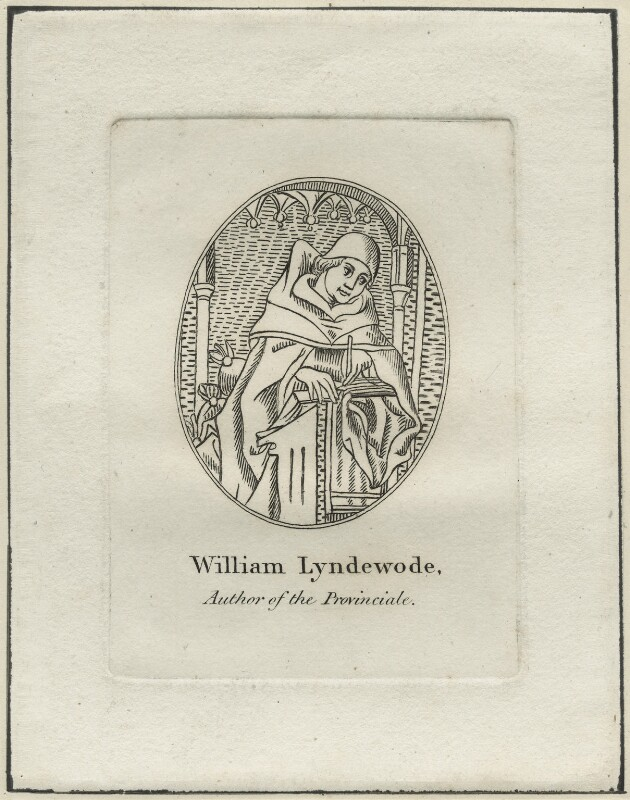
- Etching of Lyndwood, likely by John Thane
- Church: Catholic Church
- Diocese: Diocese of St Davids; Diocese of Lincoln
- See: See of St David's
- Installed: 26 August 1442
- Term ended: 21 October 1446
- Predecessor: Thomas Rodburn
- Successor: John Langton
- Other posts: Archdeacon of Stow (29 May 1434 – 1442); Dean of the Arches (1426)

Lord Keeper of the Privy Seal
- In office 1432–1443
- Monarch: Henry VI
- Preceded by: William Alnwick
- Succeeded by: Thomas Beckington

Personal details
- Born: c. 1375 Linwood, Lincolnshire, United Kingdom
- Died: 21/22 October 1446
- Buried: St Mary Undercroft, St Stephen's Chapel, Westminster, UK
- Parents: John Lyndwood (father)
- Education: Gonville Hall, Cambridge

William Lyndwood (c. 1375 – 21/22 October 1446) was an English bishop of St. David's, diplomat and canonist, most notable for the publication of the Provinciale.

== Early life ==
Lyndwood was born in Linwood, Lincolnshire, one of seven children. His parents were John Lyndwood (died 1419), a prosperous wool merchant, and his wife Alice. There is a monumental brass to John Lyndwood in the local parish church in which an infant William is portrayed decked in the robes of a doctor of laws.

Lyndwood was educated at Gonville Hall, Cambridge though few details are known. He is thought to have become a fellow of Pembroke College, Cambridge though later he moved to Oxford where he became DCL "probably rather by incorporation than constant education". He took Holy Orders and was ordained deacon in 1404 and priest in 1407.

== Career ==
Lyndwood had a distinguished ecclesiastical career. In 1408, Robert Hallum, Bishop of Salisbury appointed Lyndwood to his consistory court. Then, in 1414, Lyndwood was appointed "Official" of the Archbishop of Canterbury (i.e. his principal adviser and representative in matters of ecclesiastical law) in 1414, and Dean of the Arches in 1426, while holding at the same time several important benefices and prebends. In 1433, he was collated Archdeacon of Stow in the Diocese of Lincoln, and in 1442, after an earnest recommendation from King Henry VI, he was promoted by Pope Eugene IV to the vacant See of St. David's. During these years Lyndwood's attention was occupied by many other matters besides the study of canon law. He had been closely associated with Archbishop Henry Chichele in his proceedings against the Lollards. He had also acted several times as the chosen representative of the English clergy in their discussions with the Crown over subsidies, but more especially he had repeatedly been sent abroad on diplomatic missions, for example to Portugal, France and the Netherlands, besides acting as the King's Proctor at the Council of Basle in 1433 and taking a prominent part as negotiator in arranging political and commercial treaties.

He was also Keeper of the Privy Seal from 1432 to 1443. Despite the fact that so much of Lyndwood's energies were spent upon purely secular concerns nothing seems ever to have been said against his moral or religious character. He was buried in St Mary Undercroft, the crypt of St Stephen's Chapel, where his body was found in 1852, wrapped in a ceremonial cloth and allegedly "almost without signs of corruption".

== The Provinciale ==
Lyndwood, however, is chiefly remembered for his great commentary upon the ecclesiastical decrees enacted in English provincial councils under the presidency of the Archbishops of Canterbury. This elaborate work, commonly known as the Provinciale, follows the arrangement of the titles of the Decretals of Gregory IX in the Corpus Juris, and copies of much of the medieval English legislation enacted, in view of special needs and local conditions, to supplement the jus commune. Lyndwood's gloss gives an account of the views accepted among the English clergy of his day upon all sorts of subjects. It should be read together with John of Acton's gloss, composed circa 1333–1335, on the Legatine Constitutions of the thirteenth century papal legates, Cardinals Otto and Ottobuono for England, which was published with the Provinciale by Wynkyn de Worde.

The Provinciale was published as Constituciones prouinciales ecclesie anglica[n]e by Wynkyn de Worde in London in 1496). The work was frequently reprinted in the early years of the sixteenth century, but the edition produced at Oxford in 1679 is sometimes seen as the best.

The Catholic Encyclopaedia saw the work as important in the controversy over the attitude of the Ecclesia Anglicana towards the jurisdiction of the pope. Frederic William Maitland controversially appealed to Lyndwood's authority against the view that the "Canon Law of Rome, though always regarded as of great authority in England, was not held to be binding on the English ecclesiastical courts". The Catholic Encyclopaedia also contends that Maitland's arguments had found broader acceptance in English law:

In pre-Reformation times no dignitary of the Church, no archbishop, or bishop could repeal or vary the Papal decrees [and, after quoting Lyndwood's explicit statement to this effect, the account continues] Much of the Canon Law set forth in archiepiscopal constitutions is merely a repetition of the Papal canons, and passed for the purpose of making them better known in remote localities; part was ultra vires, and the rest consisted of local regulations which were only valid in so far as they did not contravene the jus commune, i.e. the Roman Canon Law.

— Halsbury's Laws of England (1910) vol. 11, p. 377.

However, Maitland's view of Lyndwood's authority was attacked by Ogle.

== Bibliography ==
- Baker, J. H. (1992). "Famous English canon lawyers: IV William Lyndwood, LL.D. (†1446) bishop of St David's'". Ecclesiastical Law Journal. 2: 268–72. doi:10.1017/S0956618X00001381.
- Baker, J. H. (1998). Monuments of Endlesse Labours: English Canonists and Their Work, 1300–1900. London and Rio Grande: The Hambledon Press with the Ecclesiastical Law Society. ISBN 1-85285-167-8.
- Cheney, C. R. (1973). "William Lyndwood's Provinciale". Medieval Texts and Studies: 158–84.
- Ferme, B.E. (1996). Canon Law in Late Medieval England: A Study of William Lyndwood's 'Provinciale' with Particular Reference to Testamentary Law. Rome: LAS. ISBN 88-213-0329-2.
- Helmholz, R. H. (2006) "Lyndwood, William (c.1375–1446)", Oxford Dictionary of National Biography, Oxford University Press, online edn, accessed 8 Sept 2007 (subscription, Wikipedia Library access or UK public library membership required)
- Hunter, J. (1852). "A few notices respecting William Lynwode, judge of the arches, keeper of the privy seal, and bishop of St. David's". Archaeologia. 34: 403–5. doi:10.1017/s0261340900001193.
- Maitland, F. W. (1898). Roman Canon Law in the Church of England. London: Methuen & Co.
- Ogle, A. (2000) [1912]. The Canon Law in Mediaeval England: An Examination of William Lyndwood's "Provinciale," in Reply to the Late Professor F. W. Maitland. Lawbook Exchange Ltd. ISBN 1-58477-026-0.
- Powicke, F. Maurice and E. B. Fryde Handbook of British Chronology 2nd. ed. London:Royal Historical Society 1961
- Reeves, A. C. (1989) "The careers of William Lyndwood", in J. S. Hamilton and P. J. Bradley (eds) Documenting the Past: Essays in Medieval History Presented to George Peddy Cuttino, pp197–216, Woodbridge: Boydell Press, ISBN 0-85115-515-4
- Thurston, H. (1913) "William Lyndwood", Catholic Encyclopaedia
- Lyndwood's Provinciale: The Text of the Canons Therein Contained, Reprinted from the Translation Made in 1534, ed. J. V. Bullard and H. Chalmer Bell (London: Faith Press, 1929).

Political offices
Preceded by William Alnwick	Lord Privy Seal; 1432–1443	Succeeded by Thomas Beckington
Church in Wales titles
Preceded by Thomas Rodburn	Bishop of St David's; 1442–1446	Succeeded by John Langton
