= William Strickland (bishop) =

15th-century Bishop of Carlisle

- Bishop of Carlisle
- Appointed: before 15 August 1400
- Term ended: 30 August 1419
- Predecessor: Thomas Merke
- Successor: Roger Whelpdale

Orders
- Consecration: 15 August 1400

Personal details
- Died: 30 August 1419
- Denomination: Catholic

William Strickland (died 1419) was an English priest and sometime Rector of St. Mary's Church, Horncastle who served as Bishop of Carlisle from 1400 until 1419. He was appointed by Pope Boniface IX, but not initially accepted by King Henry IV, although he did confirm the appointment after the chapter had elected him. He was consecrated on 15 August 1400. Strickland was one of the commissioners who negotiated peace with Scotland in 1401.

Early in life he had been married to Isabel, daughter and heiress of Thomas de Warthecopp, of that place, and Margaret his wife, by whom he had a daughter Margaret. This Margaret married twice, first to Sir John de Derwentwater, and secondly to Sir Robert de Lowther. By these two marriages she had at least ten children, more probably eleven.

Strickland died on 30 August 1419.

== Citations ==
Catholic Church titles
Preceded by Thomas Merke	Bishop of Carlisle; 1400–1419	Succeeded by Roger Whelpdale
