= Robert Reed (bishop, died 1415) =

14th and 15th-century Bishop of Carlisle, Waterford and Lismore, and Chichester

- Bishop of Chichester
- Appointed: 5 October 1396
- Term ended: June 1415
- Predecessor: Robert Waldby
- Successor: Stephen Patrington
- Previous posts: Bishop of Waterford; Bishop of Carlisle

Personal details
- Died: June 1415
- Denomination: Catholic

Robert Reed (or Reade; died 1415) was a Bishop of Waterford and Lismore, Bishop of Carlisle and Bishop of Chichester.

Reed was a Dominican friar. He was selected as Bishop of Waterford on 9 September 1394, and transferred to Carlisle on 26 January 1396.

Reed was translated from Carlisle to Chichester on 5 October 1396.

Reed died in June 1415. Reed requested, in his will, that he wished to be buried at the foot of his predecessor William Rede before the high altar of Chichester cathedral.

== Citations ==
Catholic Church titles
Preceded by Thomas le Reve	Bishop of Waterford and Lismore; 1394–1396	Succeeded by Thomas Sparkford
Preceded by Thomas Appleby	Bishop of Carlisle; 1396	Succeeded by Thomas Merke
Preceded by Robert Waldby	Bishop of Chichester; 1396–1415	Succeeded by Stephen Patrington
