= John Acton (canon lawyer) =

English canon lawyer

John Acton (died 1350) was an English canon lawyer, known for his commentary on the writer on the ecclesiastical Constitutions of two papal legates of the thirteenth century. Sent to Henry III of England were Cardinal Otto, i.e., Otto of Tonengo, and Cardinal Ottobone, i.e., Ottobuono de' Fieschi (the future Pope Adrian V). His name is variously spelt Achedune, De Athona, Athone, and Eaton.

== Life ==
Acton is stated by John Leland to have been educated at the University of Oxford and to have taken there the degree of LL.D. He was a pupil of John de Stratford. In 1329 he was provided by the pope with a canonry and a prebend in Lincoln Cathedral, but some years appear to have elapsed before he obtained these preferments. In 1343 he is found holding the prebend of Welton Ryval. In his books he is described as a canon of Lincoln. He died in 1350.

== Works ==
Acton's chief work was a commentary on the ecclesiastical ‘constitutions’ of Otto and Ottobone, in succession papal legates in England in the thirteenth century. These constitutions formed for many years the English canon law, and Acton's notes were held by the lawyers of his own time in their interpretations. Many manuscript copies of Acton's commentary survived in the college libraries at Oxford. Acton's work was printed for the first time in 1496 by Wynkyn de Worde in William Lyndwood's Provinciale. Printed copies contain anachronistic references to books that were not written until after the death of Acton.

Sir Henry Spelman made use of Acton's commentary in his Concilia. It was then partly translated in John Johnson's Collection of Ecclesiastical Laws (London, 1720; cf. the English translation of Otto's Ecclesiastical Laws, by J. W. White, 1844, where many of his notes are translated). Other manuscripts are extant, and John Pits gave titles of other legal books ascribed to Acton.

Frederic William Maitland wrote of Acton that he was "a little too human to be strictly scientific." His gloss often becomes a growl against the bad world in which he lives, the greedy prelates, the hypocritical friars, the rapacious officials."
