= Thomas Netter =

English Scholastic theologian and controversialist

Thomas Netter, OCarm (c. 1375 – 2 November 1430) was an English Scholastic theologian and controversialist. From his birthplace he is commonly called Thomas of Walden, or Thomas Waldensis.

== Life ==
Born at Saffron Walden, Essex, as a young adult he entered the Carmelite Order in London, and pursued his studies partly there and partly at Oxford, where he took degrees, and spent a number of years in teaching, as may be gathered from the titles of his writings (the actual works being for the greater part lost), which embrace the whole of philosophy, Scripture, canon law, and theology, that is, a complete academical course. He was well read in the classics and the ecclesiastical writers known at the beginning of the fifteenth century, as is proved by numerous quotations in his own writings. Only the dates of his ordinations as acolyte and subdeacon are on record, 1394 and 1395.

His public life began in 1409, when he was sent to the Council of Pisa, where he is said to have upheld the rights of the council. Back in England he took a prominent part in the prosecution of Wycliffites and Lollards, assisting at the trials of William Taylor (1410), Sir John Oldcastle (1413), William White (1428), preaching at St. Paul's Cross against Lollardism, and writing copiously on the questions in dispute ("De religione perfectorum", "De paupertate Christi", "De Corpore Christi", etc.). The House of Lancaster having chosen Carmelite friars for confessors, an office which included the duties of chaplain, almoner, and secretary and which frequently was rewarded with some small bishopric, Netter succeeded Stephen Patrington as confessor to Henry V of England, and provincial of the Carmelites (1414). No political importance seems to have been attached to such positions.

In 1415 Netter was sent by the king to the Council of Constance, where the English nation, though small in numbers, asserted its influence. He must have interrupted his residence at Constance by one, if not several, visits to his province. At the conclusion of the council he, with William Clynt, doctor in Divinity, and two knights, was sent by the English king on an embassy to the King of Poland, the Grand Duke of Lithuania, and the Grand master of the Teutonic Knights. The pope was represented by two Italian bishops, and the emperor by the Archbishop of Milan. The object of the mission was to bring about a mutual understanding and prevent the failure of the papal army against the Hussites. It has been asserted that on this occasion Netter converted Vytautas, Grand Duke of Lithuania, to Christianity, and was instrumental in his recognition as king and his subsequent coronation. Although all this is doubtful, it is possible that Netter did exercise some influence during his brief stay in eastern Europe, for he has been styled the Apostle of Lithuania; he also established several convents of his order in Prussia.

He returned to England in the autumn of 1420, and devoted the remainder of his life to the government of his province and the composition of his principal work. Fragments of his correspondence lately published throw a light on his endeavours in the former capacity, showing him a strict reformer, yet kind and even tender. Henry V having died in his arms, he appears to have acted as tutor (rather than confessor) to the infant King Henry VI, whose piety may be attributed, at least in part, to Netter's influence. He accompanied the young king to France in the spring of 1430, and died six months later in the odour of sanctity at Rouen. Miracles having been wrought at his tomb, the question of the confirmation of his cult went to the Congregation of Rites.

== Works ==
The Doctrinale antiquitatum fidei ecclesiae catholicae is in three parts, the first of which might be termed "De vera religione", the second bears the title "De sacramentis adversus Wiclefistas" etc., and the last "De Sacramentalibus". The first two were presented to the pope, who on 8 August 1427, expressed his satisfaction, encouraging the author to continue his undertaking, and communicating to him the text of the Bull condemning the errors of Wyclif Dudum ab apostolorum. Some Carmelites, notably Ludovicus de Lyra and John Hottus, discovered it in the library of Paris and secured its publication (1523). It was reprinted at Paris (1532), Salamanca (1557), Venice (1571 and 1757). It is a complete apologia of Catholic dogma and ritual against the attacks of the Wycliffites, and was largely drawn upon by the controversialists of the sixteenth and seventeenth centuries. Among his more memorable comments, he summed up the traditional view, "In the affairs of the faith, skilled spiritual men are said to understand, the rest of the people only simply to believe".
