= Thomas Merke =

Fourteenth-century Bishop of Carlisle

- Bishop of Carlisle
- Appointed: before 23 April 1397
- Term ended: 1409
- Predecessor: Robert Reed
- Successor: William Strickland

Orders
- Consecration: 23 April 1397

Personal details
- Died: 1409
- Denomination: Catholic

Thomas Merke (or Merks; died 1409) was an English priest and Bishop of Carlisle from 1397 to 1400.

Educated at Oxford University, Merke became a Benedictine monk at Westminster Abbey and was consecrated as Bishop of Carlisle about 23 April 1397. He served Richard II as an ambassador to various German princes, was one of the commissioners who negotiated the dowry of Isabella of Valois in 1398 and accompanied the king as his advisor and military chaplain during the suppression of Irish rebels in 1399.

Merke supported Richard against the usurper Henry IV and in 1400 was imprisoned in the Tower of London and deprived of his bishopric as a result. Although released and conditionally pardoned the following year, he was replaced as Bishop by a supporter of Henry's. Merke resumed his duties as an auxiliary Bishop and went on to serve as acting Bishop of the Diocese of Winchester several times. He was among the Catholic bishops who sided against Pope Gregory XII at Lucca in 1408, during the Great Schism of the West. He died in 1409.

Merke's role in supporting the king is represented in Samuel Daniel's poem The Civil Wars Between the Houses of Lancaster and York and in William Shakespeare's play Richard II.

== Citations ==
Catholic Church titles
| Preceded by Robert Reed | Bishop of Carlisle; 1397–1400 | Succeeded by William Strickland |
