= Peter Stokes =

Peter Stokes (died 1399) was an English Carmelite friar, known as an opponent of the teachings of John Wyclif.

== Life ==
Stokes became a Carmelite at Hitchin, Hertfordshire. Later at the University of Oxford, he graduated there as doctor of divinity, by 1382.

During the religious troubles in that year of 1382, Stokes acted as the representative of Archbishop William Courtenay in the university. During Lent he had made an ineffectual complaint against Nicholas of Hereford; and in May he had a statement of Hereford's heresies drawn up by notaries. On 28 May the archbishop sent him a list of twenty-four heresies extracted from Wyclif's writings, and directed him to publish it in the university. Robert Rygge, the chancellor, opposed Stokes in the matter, and on 5 June, when Philip Repington preached at the Priory of St Frideswide, Stokes was prevented from publication by the implied threat of violence. On 10 June Stokes took up a position against Repington, but on the following day left Oxford at the summons of the archbishop. He had already reported what had happened in a letter to Courtenay on 6 June, and was now present in the council on 12 June, when Rygge was condemned. The royal letter of 13 July specially forbade Rygge to molest Stokes further.

Stokes, however, appears to have withdrawn from Oxford; he was in Hitchin, when he died on 18 July 1399.

== Works ==
Stokes is credited with quæstiones, conclusiones, and lecturæ. He also wrote a work in defence of William Ockham, and ‘Præconia Sacræ Scripturæ.’ But the only one of Stokes's writings which seems to have survived is his letter to Archbishop Courtenay on 6 June 1382; it is printed in Fasciculi Zizaniorum.
