= Doulting Stone Quarry =

Limestone quarry in Somerset, England

Coordinates: 51°11′25″N 2°30′06″W

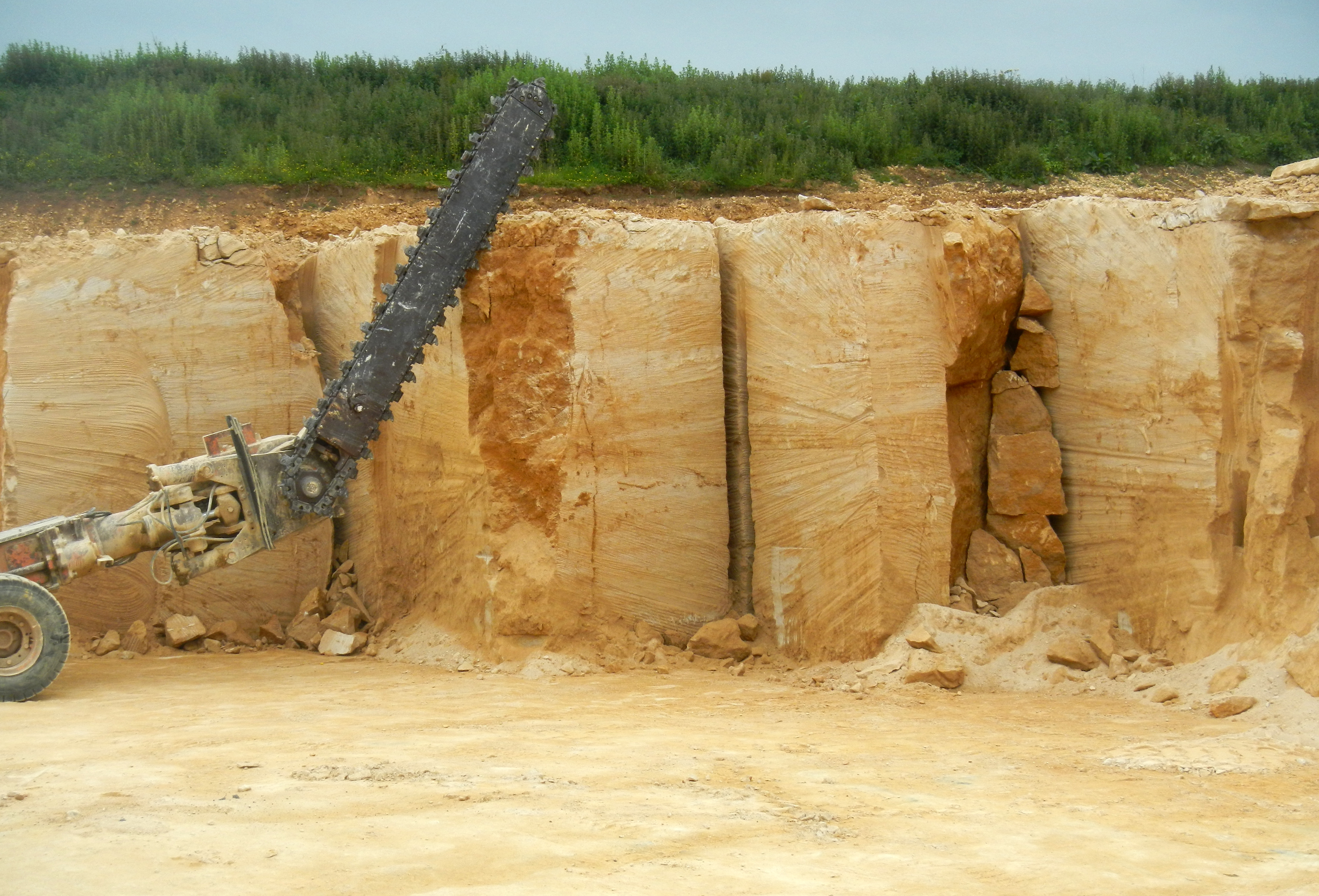
Inferior Oolite stone being quarried at Doulting

Doulting Stone Quarry (grid reference ST648436) is a limestone quarry at Doulting, on the Mendip Hills, Somerset, England.

At present there are only three quarries quarrying Doulting stone. The largest, The Doulting Stone Quarry, was producing building stone in Roman times. In the 20th century it was operated by the Keevil family. Until 1994 it was operated by Amalgamated Roadstone Corporation (now part of Hanson plc) but was then bought out as a stand-alone business. Ham & Doulting Stone Co Ltd own the east quarry which was originally in use for centuries after which followed a period of inactivity. It was reopened 12 years ago. The quarry also offers primary and secondary cutting and profiling.

The stone quarried at Doulting is a 2 m (6.6 ft) thick layer of oolite of middle Jurassic age, deposited as sediments in fairly shallow coastal seas. The stone is unusual as it shows unconformity at the division between the oolite and Carboniferous limestone beneath, representing two types of rocks laid down millions of years apart, the intervening sediments having been eroded away before the Jurassic strata were laid down. It has a high level of water absorption and porosity.

The stone is used for building purposes, including Glastonbury Abbey and the west façade of Wells Cathedral, and other structures in the cathedral close, such as the fortified gate called The Bishop's Eye.

== See also ==
- Quarries of the Mendip Hills
