= Cathedral close =

Area immediately around a cathedral

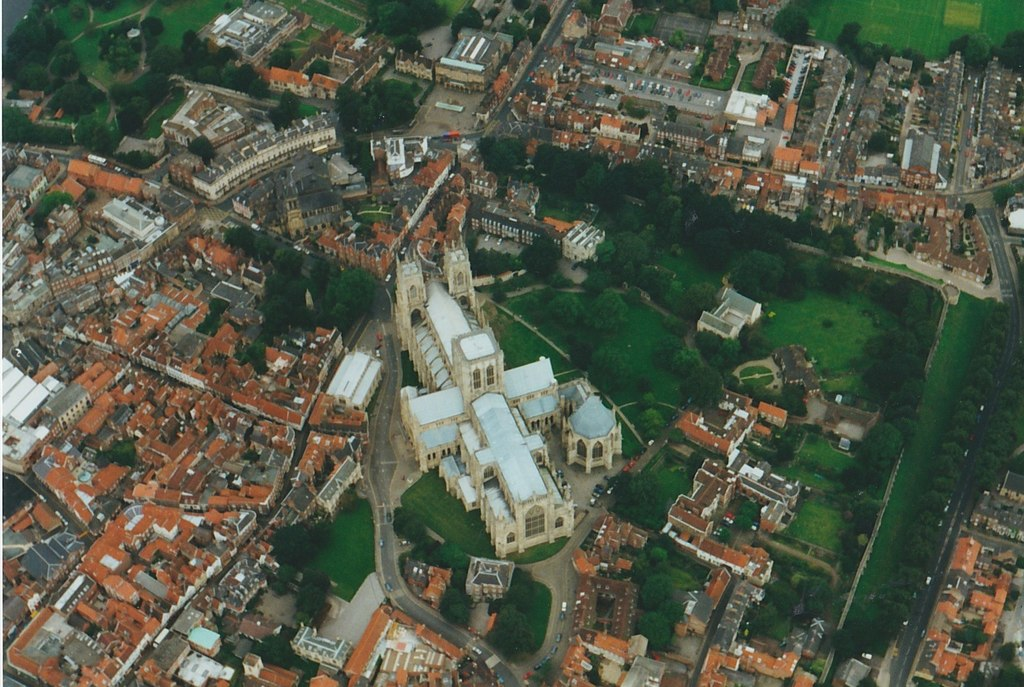
The close of York Minster is bounded by the city walls to the north (right) and merges with the city to the south (left).

A cathedral close is the area immediately around a cathedral, sometimes extending for a hundred metres or more from the main cathedral building. In Europe in the Middle Ages, and often later, it was usually all the property of the cathedral, and under the bishop or cathedral's legal jurisdiction rather than that of the surrounding city. It normally had gates which were locked at night or when there were disturbances in the wider city, hence the name – "close" in the sense of "something enclosed". It usually included buildings housing diocesan offices, schools, free-standing chapels associated with the cathedral, and the palace of the bishop and other clergy houses associated with the cathedral. Cathedral closes are sometimes – but not necessarily – arranged in a sort of square around a courtyard, as at the close at Salisbury Cathedral, which is the largest in Britain.

In the 21st century such areas often include residences of non-clerics, possibly including the houses of official or prominent persons (such as judges' houses). Until recent local-government reforms many cathedral closes still functioned as separate administrative units: St. David's cathedral close, in Pembrokeshire, counted as a separate civil parish distinct from that of the adjacent village-city for some 50 years after the 1914 disestablishment of the Church in Wales. Other closes still have the secularised former residences of canons but no resident senior clergy. In some cities, such as Trier, property close to the cathedral is occupied by clergy. The equivalent German term is Domfreiheit.

== In literature ==
The Barchester novels (Chronicles of Barsetshire) of Anthony Trollope are set largely in the cathedral close of the fictional town of Barchester.

== See also ==
- Vicars' Close, Wells
