= Thomas Beckington =

15th-century Bishop of Bath and Wells

- Bishop of Bath and Wells
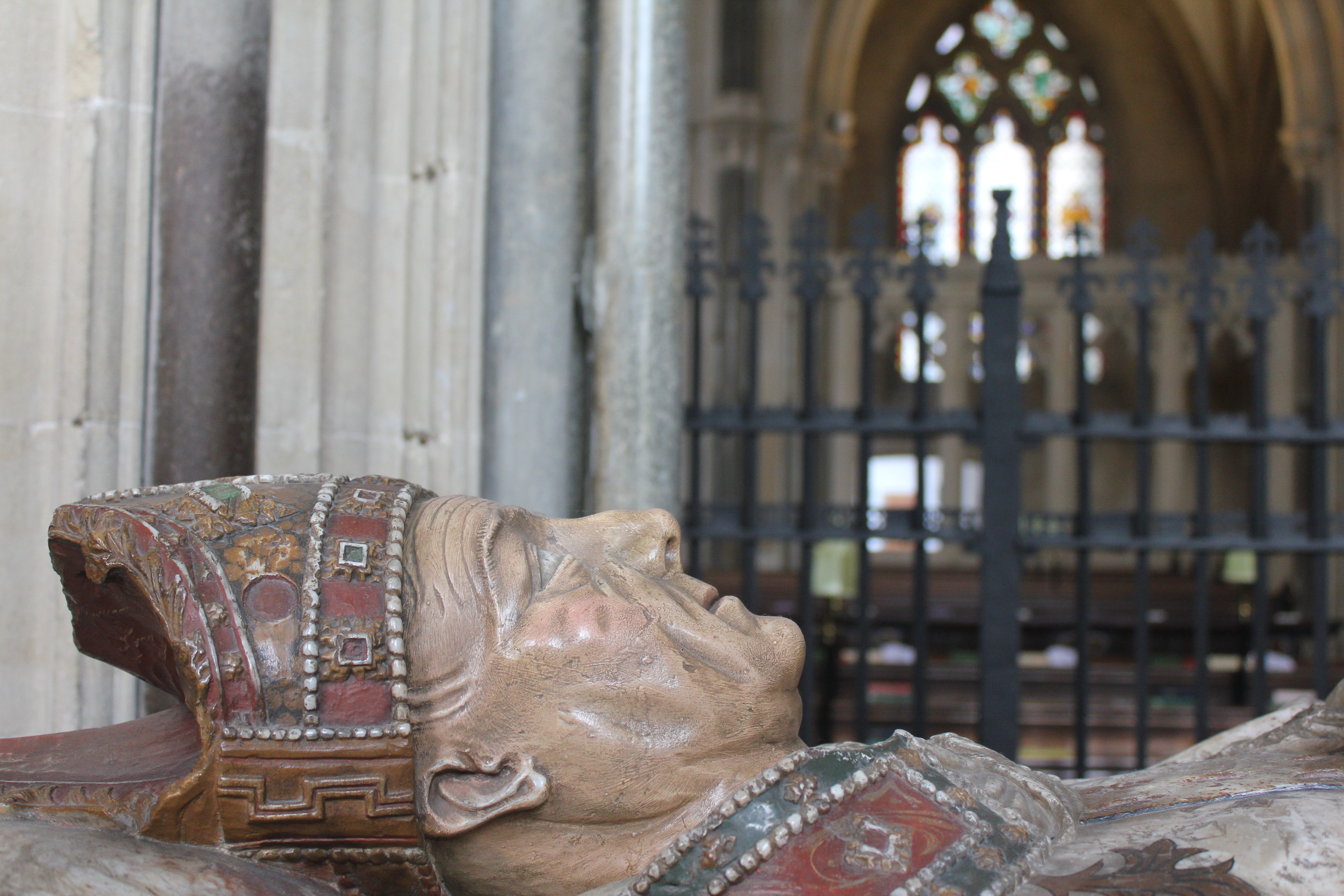
- Appointed: before 13 October 1443
- Term ended: 14 January 1465
- Predecessor: John Stafford
- Successor: Robert Stillington
- Previous post: Dean of Arches

Orders
- Consecration: 13 October 1443

Personal details
- Born: c. 1390 Beckington, Somerset
- Died: 14 January 1465 Wells
- Denomination: Roman Catholic

Thomas Beckington (also spelt Beckynton; c. 1390 – 14 January 1465) was the Bishop of Bath and Wells and King's Secretary in medieval England under Henry VI.

== Life ==
Beckington was born at Beckington in Somerset, and was educated at Winchester and New College, Oxford. Having entered the Church he held many ecclesiastical appointments, and became dean of the Arches in 1423; and Archdeacon of Buckingham in 1424. After that he devoted his time to secular affairs and was sent on an embassy to Calais in 1439 and to John IV, Count of Armagnac in 1442.

At this time Beckington was acting as secretary to Henry VI, and soon after his return in 1443 he was appointed Lord Privy Seal, an office he held until 1444. He was consecrated Bishop of Bath and Wells on 13 October 1443. The bishop erected many buildings in Wells and elsewhere, probably altering the rectory at Sutton Courtenay in Berkshire (now Oxfordshire), an early preferment. The most important results of Beckington's missions to France were one Latin journal, written by himself, referring to the embassy to Calais; and another, written by one of his attendants, relating to the journey to Armagnac. He died at Wells on 14 January 1465.

Beckington is buried at Wells Cathedral and has an unusual monument there: his effigy is depicted twice; one above the other in a two tier arrangement, the bottom effigy depicting his decaying corpse whilst unwrapped from its shroud, and the effigy above depicting him in what is assumed to be his bishop's attire. When his tomb was opened during Victorian times he was found to be buried very simply (as depicted on his tomb) with just one ornament: his bishop's ring. This was removed and is now in a museum.

Beckington played a leading role as architect of the legal aspects of Henry VI's foundation of Eton College in 1440; he is commemorated in the name of the school's central dining hall, 'Bekynton'.

In a letter from 1449, Beckington remarked of Bath mentioning that the healing waters of Bath has been turned into abuse by the shamelessness of the inhabitants of the city. Further mentioning:

"by ... custom of the city, [the people] shamelessly strip them of their said garments and reveal to them to the gaze of bystanders."

Bekynton's architecture is marked with a symbol depicting a barrel and a flame. This is a pun on his name, being "beacon tun". One of the easiest to be viewed is in Penniless Porch Wells.

== Works ==
Beckington's own journal was published in the Proceedings of the Privy Council, vol. v., edited by Nicholas Harris Nicolas (1835); and the other journal in the Official Correspondence of Thomas Bekynton, edited by George Williams for the Rolls Series (1872), which contains many interesting letters. This second journal was translated into English by Nicolas (1828).

== See also ==
- Secretary of State (England)

== Citations ==
Political offices
Preceded by William Lyndwood	Lord Privy Seal; 1443–1444	Succeeded by Adam Moleyns
Catholic Church titles
Preceded by John Stafford	Bishop of Bath and Wells; 1434–1465	Succeeded by Robert Stillington
